= List of prison escapes =

The following is a list of historically infamous prison escapes, and of people who escaped multiple times:

== Famous historical escapes ==
There have been many infamous escapes from prison throughout history:

=== 13th century ===
- In 1244, whilst imprisoned in the Tower of London, Gruffydd ap Llywelyn Fawr crafted a makeshift rope made of bed sheets and cloths, lowered it, and climbed down. However, due to his weight, the rope broke and he fell to his death.

=== 16th century ===
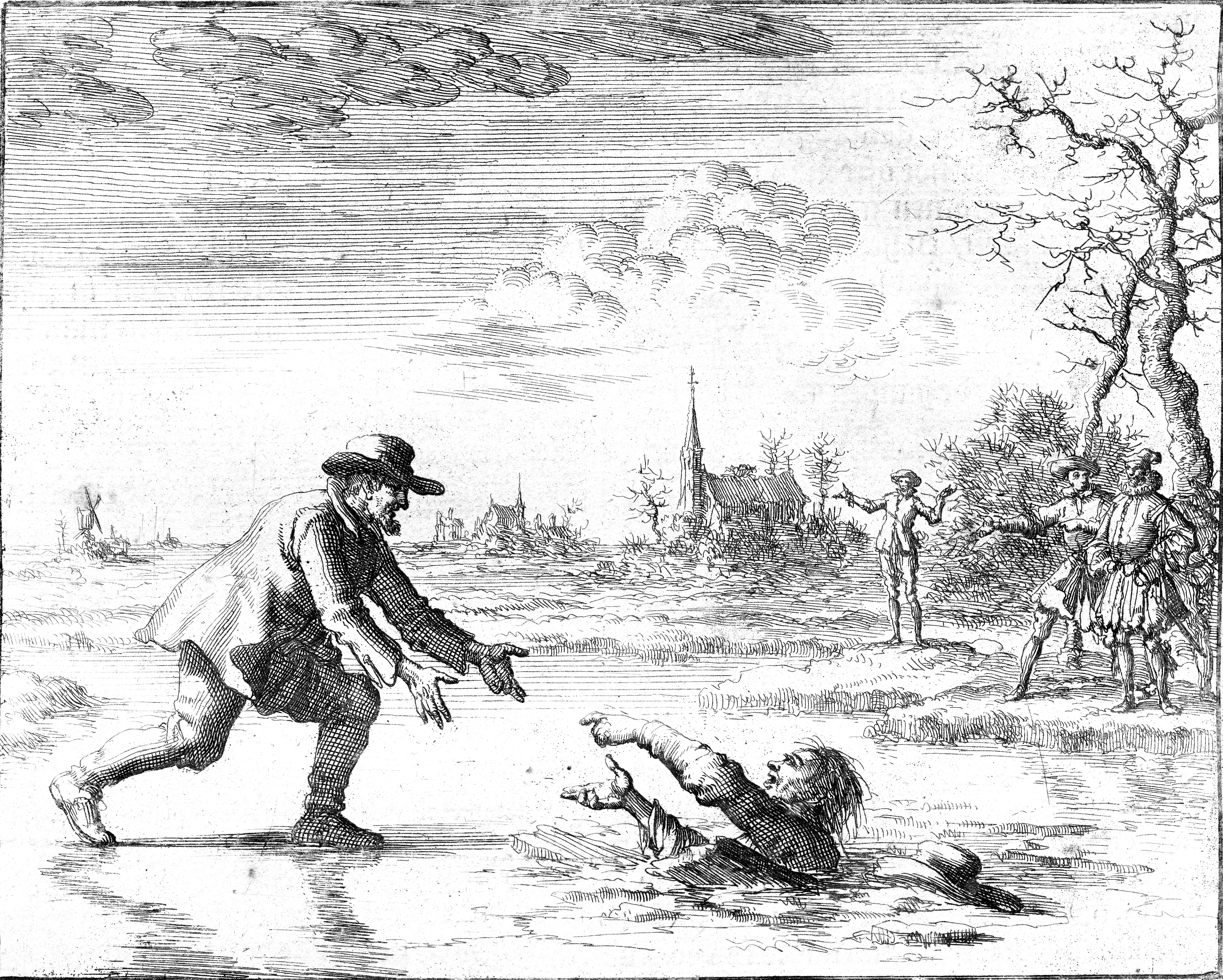
Dirk Willems saves his pursuer in this etching from the 1685 edition of Martyrs Mirror.

- Dirk Willems (also spelled Durk Willems; died 16 May 1569) was a Dutch Anabaptist martyr most famous for escaping from prison but then turning back to rescue his pursuer – who had fallen through thin ice while chasing Willems – only to be recaptured, tortured, and killed (burned at the stake) for his beliefs.

=== 17th century ===
- In 1621, Dutch author Hugo de Groot escaped from Loevestein Castle, where he was held captive, by hiding himself inside a book chest. He was then smuggled outside.

=== 18th century ===
- The French priest Abbé Bucquoy escaped from For-l'Évêque in 1705 and from the Bastille in 1709.
- Englishman Jack Sheppard took to theft and burglary in 1723, and was arrested and imprisoned five times in 1724 but escaped four times, making him a notorious public figure and wildly popular with the poorer classes.
- The Italian author and adventurer Giacomo Casanova escaped from prison in 1757.
- In 1781, Samuel Smedley was imprisoned in Old Mill Prison in Portsmouth, England. Smedley eventually escaped.
- Eugène-François Vidocq a French criminal turned criminalist, and considered to be the father of modern criminology and of the French national police force, escaped multiple times in 1795 – 1796 over the course of a few weeks at the age of 20 while in captivity with the help of Francine, but was always captured soon again. He is also regarded as the first private detective. The former criminal became the founder and first director of France's first criminal investigative agency, the Sûreté Nationale, as well as the head of the first known private detective agency.

=== 19th century ===
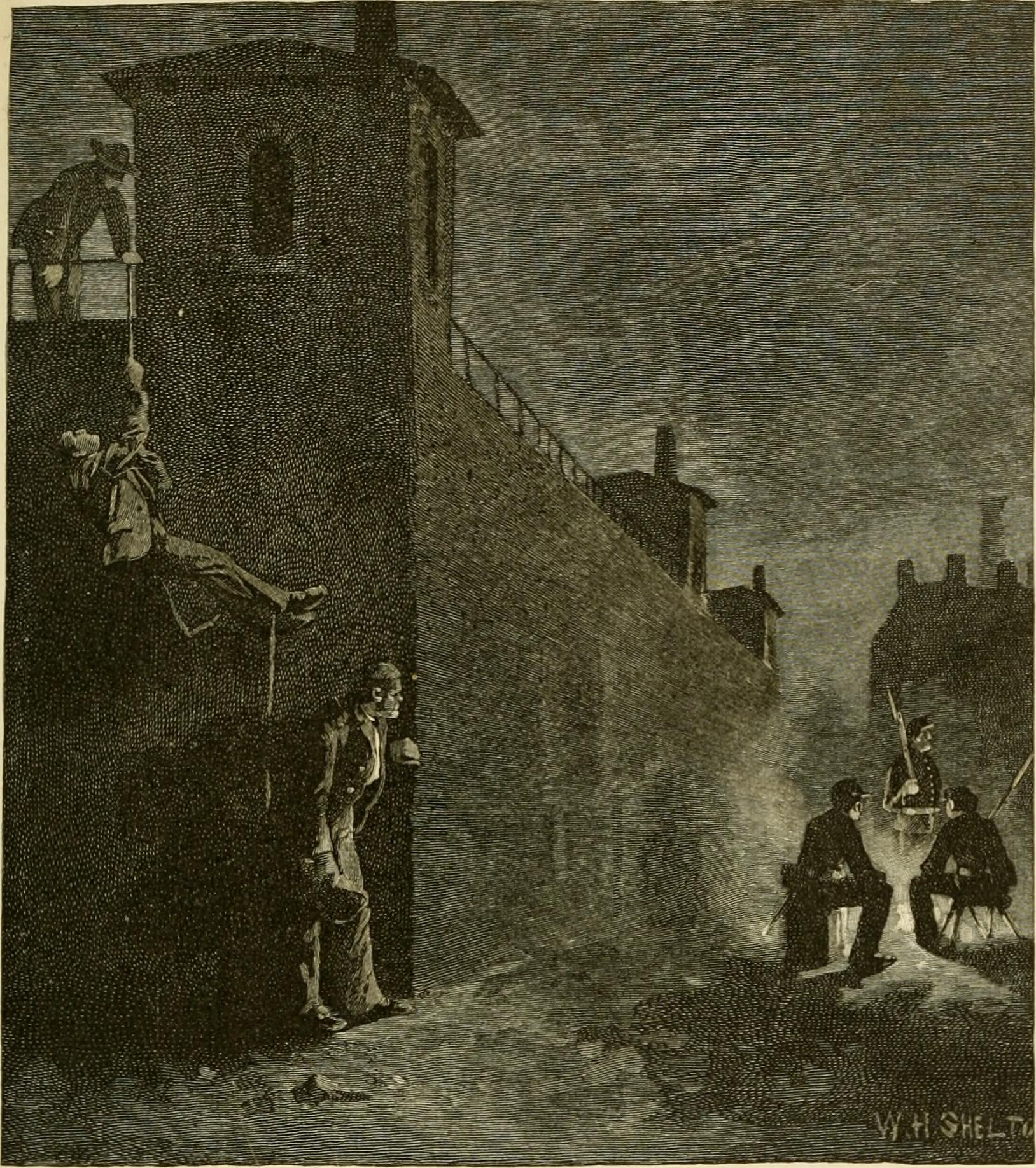
Morgan and his officers escaping

- On January 10, 1837, six student who have been sctentenced to lifelong imprisonment for participitian in the storming of the Frankfurt Guardhouse Konstabler Wache in 1833, escaped from the prison in Frankfurt. The escape became subject in a political song.
- On 27 November 1863, Confederate general John Hunt Morgan and six of his officers, most notably Thomas Hines, escaped from their cells in the Ohio Penitentiary by digging a tunnel from Hines' cell into the inner yard and then ascending a wall with a rope made from bunk coverlets and a bent poker iron.
- In the Libby Prison escape, during the American Civil War, over 109 Union POWs broke out of a building at Libby Prison in Richmond, Virginia, on the night between 9 and 10 February 1864. Fifty-nine of the 109 prisoners successfully made it back to the Union lines; two were drowned in the nearby James River, and 48 were recaptured.
- Anarchist activist Peter Kropotkin managed to escape from a low-security prison in Saint Petersburg. He hid himself in one of the finest restaurants there and later moved to England.
- The notorious outlaw Billy the Kid managed to escape from prison in 1881, but was captured and shot by Pat Garrett only a few months later.
- Italian brigand Giuseppe Musolino escaped from prison in 1899, subsequently going on a killing spree targeted against those who testified against him at his first trial. He was recaptured in 1901.

=== 1900–1949 ===
- In 1901, Lum You was convicted of murder and sentenced to death by a Pacific County, Washington, court. He enjoyed great public sympathy, including from county officials, who supposedly allowed him to escape by leaving his cell door unlocked at night. He eventually seized the opportunity, but within a few days he either gave himself up or was recaptured.
- German Naval Air Service Kapitänleutnant Gunther Plüschow escaped from the Donington Hall prisoner of war camp in 1915.
- Frederick Mors, an Austrian-born American serial killer, was declared insane and placed into the Matteawan Institution for the Insane in the United States in 1915. He escaped in 1916 and was never seen again but supposedly resurfaced in Connecticut in 1917. His body was possibly found in 1923 and identified as a suicide.
- In 1921, at age 22 Victor Folke Nelson made a sensational and highly publicized run and escape from a line of 13 prisoners after attending chapel at the Charlestown State Prison. Despite an attempted intervening tackle from a prisoner trusty and bullets from a guard's gun, Nelson ran some distance, leapt, caught the lower end of the window bars, and scaled the 40-foot high wall of the prison's Cherry Hill section. At the top of the wall, he performed "what was always believed an impossible stunt: throwing his body across a 10-foot space to the wall," where he managed to catch hold of the coping of a nearby structure and then to drop 30 feet down to the Boston and Maine railroad tracks. He was convinced to return to prison by his respected mentor and progressive penologist Thomas Mott Osborne several months later.
- In 1922, an IRA bomb blew a hole in the wall of the Jail in Dundalk, County Louth, Ireland. 106 IRA prisoners escaped. A few weeks later, these same prisoners returned fully armed, and took over the whole prison, freeing remaining prisoners.
- Leonard T. Fristoe was born 15 January 1893 and was imprisoned for double murder in 1920 of two Sheriff's deputies in Nevada. He escaped from Carson State Prison, Nevada, in 1923 after seizing an opportunity to escape after he and another inmate drove the police warden to a brothel. He lived for 46 years under the alias of Claude R. Willis, before being turned in by his son, Claude R. Willis Jr, after an argument. He stated that he only killed the deputies because they fired at him first, and also confessed to killing a man named Rowe in Curero, Texas, about two years after his escape. After serving 5 months in prison, the Nevada Pardon Board ordered he be released from Carson State Prison, despite the fact he had only served 2 1/2 years of the life sentence given to him in 1920. Whilst the chairman of the board, Gov. Paul Laxalt, disagreed with the killings of the two deputies, he saw no point in keeping a frail old man in jail, stating that 5 months behind bars is psychologically years for a 77-year-old man. He died of a respiratory infection on 13 March 1976 in Denver City, Texas.
- Theodorus van Berkel, a Dutch national who was charged with the rape of a young woman in Green Bay, Wisconsin, in 1930, escaped from prison after sawing off the bars of his cell and bending them with a smuggled metal pipe. He was captured, but escaped with another prisoner two weeks later using a similar method. Van Berkel and his accomplice were caught within hours of each other a day later.
- John Dillinger served time at the Indiana State Penitentiary at Michigan City, until 1933, when he was paroled. Within four months, he was back in jail in Lima, Ohio, but his gang sprang him, killing the jailer, Sheriff Jessie Sarber. Most of the gang was captured again by the end of the year in Tucson, Arizona, due to a fire at the Historic Hotel Congress. Dillinger alone was sent to the Lake County jail in Crown Point, Indiana. He was to face trial for the suspected killing of police officer William O'Malley during a bank shootout in East Chicago, Indiana, some time after his escape from jail. During this time on trial, a famous photograph was taken of Dillinger putting his arm on prosecutor Robert Estill's shoulder when suggested to him by reporters.
- On 3 March 1934, Dillinger escaped from the "escape-proof" (as it was dubbed by local authorities at the time) Crown Point, Indiana county jail, which was guarded by many police officers and national guardsmen. Newspapers reported that Dillinger had escaped using a fake gun made from wood, blackened and shined with shoe polish.
- French prisoner René Belbenoît escaped from the penal colony of French Guiana on 2 March 1935, when he and five others took to the sea with a boat they had bought. After a series of daring adventures, during which all of the other escapees were captured, he reached the United States in 1937. In 1938 his account, Dry Guillotine, was published. Belbenoît had written it in French and it was translated in English by Preston Rambo. It went through 14 printings in less than a year.
- Japanese prisoner Yoshie Shiratori broke out of prison four times, first from Aomori Prison (1936), Akita Prison (1942), Abashiri Prison (1944), and Sapporo Prison (1947). A novel and TV-drama Hagoku was based on his true story.
- Fort San Cristóbal is located on the top of the mountain San Cristóbal, which is very close (4 km) to Pamplona, Spain. Built inside the mountain, it served as a prison despite the fact that it had been obsolete since its opening in 1919, due to its weakness against aviation. On 22 May 1938, during the Spanish Civil War, around 30 prisoners organised a mutiny for a massive prison break. 792 prisoners fled but only three succeeded in getting to the French border; 585 were arrested, 211 died and 14 of the arrested who were considered the leaders were sentenced to death. Most fugitives were intercepted during the following days. In 1988, a sculpture was erected to honour the memory of the prisoners who died there. The fort ceased to be a prison in 1945.
- Colditz Castle was used as an "escape-proof" prisoner-of-war camp during World War II, but over the course of 300 escape attempts, 130 prisoners escaped. Thirty escapees eventually managed to reach friendly territory. The men had tunneled, disguised themselves as guards, workmen or women, sneaked away through sewer drains, and even built a glider in a plan to get over the wall.
- André Devigny, a French resistance fighter during World War II, escaped Montluc Military Prison in Lyon with his cellmate in April 1943.
- French author Henri Charrière tried to escape in vain several times, but eventually was successful in 1943. His story, Papillon, was published and filmed under the same name.
- Following his arrest in July 1943 and replacement by Marshal Pietro Badoglio as prime minister, Benito Mussolini was broken out of confinement by German forces in September 1943 overseen by SS-Hauptsturmführer Otto Skorzeny and Major Harald Mors in the Gran Sasso raid.
- In the Great Escape, 76 Allied POWs (primarily Commonwealth airmen) escaped from Stalag Luft III during World War II. 73 of the escapees were captured and fifty of them were executed by the Gestapo, while only three succeeded in reaching neutral territories.
- In the Cowra breakout, at least 545 out of 1,004 Japanese POWs escaped from Number 12 POW Compound at Cowra, Australia, on the night of 4 August 1944. Out of the roughly 500 escapees, 231 died and 108 were wounded. 31 killed themselves and 12 were burnt to death in huts set on fire by the Japanese. Sixteen of the wounded showed signs of attempted suicide.
- In the Latrun Prison break, 20 members of the Jewish terrorist group Lehi escaped from Latrun prison camp in Latrun, Mandatory Palestine (now Israel), through a 76 meter long tunnel on the night of 31 October 1943.
- 97 Italians escaped from Camp 14 at Doonfoot, Ayr, Scotland, on 15 December 1944. When the Italian fascist regime in Italy collapsed in July 1943 the new Italian Government signed an armistice with the Allies. Most Italian POWs held in the UK were released back into the command of Italy but a few were identified as committed fascists and were detained at Camp 14. After some unrest in the camp the large scale breakout occurred through a short tunnel. They were all recaptured within a week.
- In the Great Papago Escape, over 25 German POWs escaped by tunneling out of Camp Papago Park POW facility, near Phoenix, Arizona, on the night of 23 December 1944. They then fled into the surrounding desert but because the rivers in Arizona were mostly dry and had not been navigable for decades, most of them were recaptured without bloodshed over the next few weeks.
- In the Acre Prison break, 28 members of the Jewish underground groups Irgun and Lehi escaped from Acre Prison in Acre, Mandatory Palestine (now Israel), on 4 May 1947.
- 12 members of the Jewish terrorist groups Irgun and Lehi escaped from the central prison (today the Museum of Underground Prisoners) in Jerusalem, Mandatory Palestine, on 20 February 1948.

=== 1950–1982 ===
- In 1955, serial killer Edward Edwards pushed past a guard and escaped from an Akron, Ohio jail while being held on burglary charges. By 1961, he was on the FBI's Ten Most Wanted Fugitives list. Edwards was captured in Atlanta, Georgia, on 20 January 1962.
- In 1955, John Patrick Hannan escaped from HM Prison The Verne on the Isle of Portland, Dorset, England, having spent 30 days of a 21-month sentence for vehicle theft and assaulting two police officers. As of 2023, he would be aged 90 and is still outstanding, making him perhaps the world's longest prison fugitive, overtaking the title of American double killer Leonard Fristoe's record of 45 years and 11 months as a fugitive.
- In 1959, Frank Freshwaters escaped from an Ohio prison while serving a sentence of involuntary manslaughter from a 1957 car accident. After 56 years he was arrested in Florida.
- In the Alcatraz escape on June 11 1962, American criminal brothers John and Clarence Anglin, and Frank Morris escaped Alcatraz Federal Penitentiary on Alcatraz Island using an inflatable raft, never to be seen again. It was never determined by the FBI whether they succeeded in their escape or died in the attempt.
- In 1966, serial killer Monroe Hickson escaped from the Manning Correctional Institution. In 1967, he was added on the FBI's Ten Most Wanted Fugitives list. The body of a deceased farm worker in Chapel Hill, North Carolina, was confirmed to have been Hickson in 1968.
- In 1971, a 45 meter long tunnel was dug and 111 prisoners, including future president José Mujica, escaped from the high security Punta Carretas Penitentiary in Montevideo, Uruguay. It was the largest prison escape in history.
- In 1972, six political prisoners escaped from the prison at Rawson, Argentina, and fled to neighbouring Chile in a hijacked plane. Nineteen escapees who arrived late to the airport were recaptured and 16 of them later executed.
- In 1973, three Provisional Irish Republican Army prisoners escaped in the Mountjoy Prison helicopter escape, when a hijacked helicopter landed in the exercise yard at Mountjoy Prison, Dublin, Republic of Ireland.
- In 1974, Thomas Knight, a man awaiting trial for a double murder, escaped from the Miami-Dade County Jail, along with ten other prisoners. Eight of the eleven escapees were captured within two days but Knight remained a fugitive for over three months. While on the run, Knight committed another murder. He was captured in New Smyrna Beach, Florida, and later executed in 2014.
- In 1975 Billy Hayes, a convicted drug smuggler escaped from İmralı prison on an island in the Sea of Marmara, Turkey, using a rowboat. He made his way to Greece, where he was eventually deported to the U.S. Hayes wrote a book on his experiences, Midnight Express, which was later adapted into the 1978 film of the same name starring Brad Davis as Hayes.
- The 'Piedras Negras jail escape took place on 11 March 1976 in Piedras Negras, Mexico, when several prisoners escaped after former United States Marine Corps sergeant Don Fielden and an accomplice overpowered the guards at gunpoint in an effort to release fellow American citizen Blake Davis
- On 5 April 1976, in the Segovia prison break, 29 prisoners escaped from prison, in Spain's largest prison break since the Spanish Civil War. The majority belonged to the Basque separatist group ETA. The majority of prisoners were recaptured in shootouts with the authorities in the next few days, during which one escapee was killed, though four managed to escape to France.
- On 10 June 1977, the convicted murderer of Martin Luther King Jr., James Earl Ray, escaped from Brushy Mountain State Penitentiary in Tennessee, along with six others. Ray was recaptured after two days. He had been running and hiding in the mountainous forest surrounding the prison.
- On 23 September 1977, a group of seven prisoners, including Patrick Kimumwe, escaped from the fortified compound of the State Research Bureau, the Ugandan intelligence agency during the rule of Idi Amin.
- Serial killer Carlton Gary escaped from a low-security prison by sawing through the bars of his cell. Later on 15 March 1983, Gary escaped again from police custody.
- In 1977, convicted murderer James Robert Jones escaped from prison in Kansas, and lived in Florida for 37 years under the alias of Bruce Walter Keith. He was arrested in March 2014. It is assumed that he used someone else's identity.
- On 30 December 1977, serial killer Ted Bundy escaped from prison while most of the guards were off for Christmas. He did so by sawing through the vent of his cell with a hacksaw blade, ending up in the chief jailer's apartment (who was away on Christmas break). He then stole some clothes from a closet and left the building. Earlier in June he escaped from a courthouse by jumping out a window in the court's law library.
- On 5 February 1978, Camorra boss Raffaele Cutolo escaped from psychiatric prison in Aversa after showing forged insanity tests to the judges which found Cutolo "not prosecuted". After 15 months running, he was caught in 1979 and jailed at Asinara maximum-security prison to serve his 4 life sentences after being undergone by authorities to a second more objective psychiatric test that showed Cutolo was mentally able to be prosecuted
- In 1979, Assata Shakur successfully escaped prison in Union, New Jersey, when three members of the Black Liberation Army took prison guards as hostages, freed Shakur and fled in a prison van. No one was injured during the prison break, including the guards-turned-hostages who were left in the parking lot. In 1984, Shakur escaped to Cuba where she gained political asylum. Shakur was moved to the FBI's Most Wanted Terrorists List on 2 May 2013.
- On 21 January 1980, three prisoners of Basque separatist group ETA (pm) escaped from the prison of San Sebastian. They were: Izaskun Arrazola, Jesus Maria Salegi and Mikel Matxirena. They mingled with visiting relatives and walked out the front door.
- On 23 July 1980, Zdzisław Najmrodzki, escaped from the prison in Gliwice, Poland, by jumping from the barred window. His crewmates had partially sawn off the bars a few days before the escape which allowed him to break them. Najmrodzki slid down the line outside the building and got to a motorcycle which was waiting for him. Overall, between 1974 and 1989, he had escaped in total 29 times from prisons and the authorities.
- On 11 April 1981, convicted murderer Edward Dean Kennedy escaped from the Union Correctional Facility in Florida, and hours later he murdered a state trooper and the trooper's cousin. He was eventually recaptured, was sentenced to death and was executed in 1992.
- On 8 May 1981, Željko Ražnatović, also known as Arkan, escaped from the Bijlmerbajes in Amsterdam. During his imprisonment, he obtained a gun, which facilitated his escape. Following this breakout, Arkan continued his criminal activities across Europe, including armed robberies in West Germany and Switzerland. He was frequently arrested and managed to escape multiple times from prisons in different countries, largely due to his connections with the Yugoslav secret police, who were rumored to have assisted him in these escapes.
- On 2 March 1982 in Peru, PCP guerilla fighters assaulted the Ayacucho prison, resulting in the release of 255 inmates.

=== 1983–1999 ===
- In the 1983 Batticaloa Jailbreak on 23 September 1983, 41 Tamil political prisoners and 151 criminal prisoners escaped in eastern Sri Lanka.
- In the Maze Prison escape on 25 September 1983, 38 Provisional Irish Republican Army members escaped from HMP Maze in Northern Ireland, the biggest prison escape in Irish or British history.
- On 18 January 1985, Ludwig Fresco, a convicted drug dealer, escaped from the Hague Penitentiary Institution by impersonating his own lawyer. He acquired clothing and accessories to disguise himself as an attorney, likely with the help of accomplices. Fresco managed to deceive the prison guards, who believed he was a legitimate lawyer visiting a client. He simply walked out of the prison in his disguise, leading to increased scrutiny and changes in prison security protocols.
- On 7 July 1985, in prison of San Sebastian two prisoners escaped: Joseba Sarrionandia and Iñaki Pikabea. Both of them belonged to the Basque separatist group ETA and they managed to escape as there was a concert in the jail with Basque singer Imanol Larzabal. They hid themselves inside two loudspeakers. The Basque Radical Rock group Kortatu created the song Sarri, Sarri in honor of this escape, which became a big hit. The escape was planned with theater critic Mikel Albisu, who would become the leader of ETA. He drove the van when they escaped. During three months, the two fugitives and Antza were hiding in a flat in San Sebastián, before moving to France. Since that day Sarrionandia has lived exiled in secret during more than 30 years and the topic of exile is foremost in his writings.
- On 3 September 1989, Zdzisław Najmrodzki again escaped from the prison in Gliwice, Poland, via a tunnel. While walking at the prison yard, he had fallen underground into the tunnel, dug over the course of 3 weeks by his mother and a crewmate. From the tunnel, he had got to the motorcycle prepared for him outside the prison.
- In 1984, six death row inmates, including the Briley Brothers (Linwood and James), escaped Mecklenburg Correctional Center, making it the largest mass death row escape in American history. All were recaptured within 18 days, and all six men would eventually be executed. The final execution took place in 1996.
- On 4 December 1986, William Scott Day escaped a psychiatric center in Ypsilanti, Michigan, then embarking on a killing spree in several states spanning 39 days. He was eventually re-captured and sentenced to life imprisonment in Tennessee, which he served until his death in 2006.
- In November 1987 Peter Thomson aged 19 at the time escaped from Winchester Prison. During a 2-hour window of opportunity, Peter Thomson broke out from the education wing onto the grounds and promptly made his way over the prison wall. A large-scale search was made of the surrounding area, but he was never found.
- On 22 July 1992, Colombian drug lord Pablo Escobar escaped from his own built prison La Catedral.Escobar decided to jail himself in 1991 after 7 years of war against government that murdered judges, policemen, politicians, journalists and blameless citizens but escaped when the president Cesar Gaviria's government found out Escobar had slaughtered 4 associates inside the prison. After 16 months running, Pablo Escobar was shot killed on 2 December 1993 while he attempted to escape from Search Bloc, a police unit created with the objective of hunting Pablo, alive or dead.
- On 7 March 1993, Peter Gibb and Archie Butterley escaped from the Melbourne Remand Centre in Australia, with the help of prison guard Heather Parker who was having a relationship with Gibb. Police found Butterley shot dead six days later and re-captured Gibb.
- On 12 July 1993, Ferdi Elsas, the man convicted for the kidnapping and murder of Gerrit Jan Heijn, escaped from Schutterswei (gevangenis). He sawed through the bars of his cell window and used a makeshift rope made from bedsheets to lower himself to the ground. Elsas managed to evade capture for a short period. However, he was quickly recaptured and returned to custody.
- In 1993, 10 prisoners escaped from Pārlielupe prison in Jelgava, Latvia. The following year, 95 prisoners escaped through a tunnel they had excavated. As of August 2005, four prisoners, two from each of the escapes, were still at large.
- In 1994, Arthur Rudy Martinez, an inmate serving a life sentence after being convicted of numerous rapes and robberies, escaped from a Washington State prison and eluded capture for nearly two decades. He later turned himself in to authorities after being diagnosed with cancer in an attempt to take advantage of free medical care he would receive in prison. He died two months later.
- Trikala, Greece, on 23 May 1995, Albanian inmates staged a daring escape from an old Turkish administration building-turned-prison, using weight dumbbells to break the locks of the gates and bed springs as a ladder to scale the wall. 29 prisoners escaped, and about half of them absconded to Albania and were never recaptured. Only Albanian inmates escaped, having kept escape plans secret from the prison's international population.
- On 17 March 1995, in Sublette, Kansas, Dawn Amos, Douglas Winter and David Spain escaped in the early morning hours after shooting Sheriff Deputy, Irvin Powell twice. The trio later fled to Colorado where an elderly man was kidnapped and later released unharmed. Powell later died of his injuries in an Oklahoma City hospital three days later.
- In the 1995 Vellore Fort Jailbreak on 15 August 1995, 43 Tamil Tiger inmates escaped from Vellore Fort prison in India.
- On 27 August 1995, multiple prisoners escaped from Vridsløselille Prison in Copenhagen, Denmark, after a bulldozer was driven into the prison wall.
- In January 1997, the "Pittsburgh Six" escaped from the State Correctional Institution in Pittsburgh via tunnel. All inmates were caught after 12 days.
- In January 1997, Korean criminal Shin Chang-won escaped from Busan Prison in South Korea.
- In April 1998, the Belgian child molester Marc Dutroux managed to escape for several hours. He was caught the same afternoon, but the incident forced two politicians to resign and deepened the loss of faith in the Belgian judicial system.
- Martin Gurule escaped from the Texas Death Row at Ellis Unit on 26 November 1998. He was shot during his escape and died the same night but his body wasn't found until a week later.
- In 1999, Leslie Dale Martin and three other inmates on Louisiana's death row escaped from their cells at the Louisiana State Penitentiary. They were caught within hours, before they even managed to escape prison grounds. The four men had managed the escape with the use of hacksaws that had been smuggled in for them by a bribed corrections officer. Other officers were inattentive to the inmates' two to three week effort at cutting their cell doors and window. After the escape, two corrections officers were fired and two others were demoted. Two corrections officers later overheard Martin plotting another escape, which included taking hostages and commandeering a vehicle to ram the prison's front gates. Martin was immediately moved to the holding cell outside the death chamber, a month before his execution in 2002.

=== 2000–2009 ===
- The Texas 7 escaped from John B. Connally Unit on 13 December 2000. Six of them were captured after over a month and a half on the run; the seventh killed himself before being captured.
- In January 2001, three inmates escaped from Chicago State Penitentiary's H-Unit (Hi-Max). One of them was injured during the escape, and while trying to get back into the prison, he got caught in the razor between the fences. The other two offenders (one serving a life sentence for murder, the other for rape and kidnapping) were at large for several days before being apprehended in a small town approximately 40 miles (64 km) from the prison.
- In New York, convicted murderers Timothy A. Vail and Timothy G. Morgan escaped from Elmira State Penitentiary in July 2003; both were recaptured in two days.
- The Sarposa Prison attack was a raid on the Kandahar detention facility in Kandahar, Afghanistan by Taliban insurgents on 13 June 2008. One of the largest attacks by Afghan insurgents, the raid freed 400–1000 prisoners.
- On 4 August 2008, Sarah Jo Pender escaped from Rockville Correctional Facility with the help of prison guard Scott Spitler, who was expecting a $15,000 payment. She remained on the run for four months.
- Eight inmates charged with violent crimes escaped from the Curry County Adult Detention Center in Clovis, New Mexico, on 24 August 2008. The men escaped by climbing prison pipes in a narrow space inside a wall, then using homemade instruments to cut a hole in the roof. The jailbreak was featured on a 6 September episode of America's Most Wanted. As of October 2010, convicted murderer Edward Salas was the only inmate still at large. Salas was taken into custody by the U.S. Marshals Service on 4 October 2012, in Chihuahua City, Mexico, and was extradited back to New Mexico.

=== 2009–2016 ===
- Lance Battreal, Charles Smith, and Mark Booher escaped from a Michigan City, Indiana, prison on 12 July 2009, through tunnels under the prison yard. Smith was captured on 20 July 2009, near Chicago Mayor Richard M. Daley's vacation home in Grand Beach, Michigan. Battreal was captured the next day, at his mother's house in Rockport, Indiana. Booher was captured on 23 July 2009, in a hotel in Indianapolis, Indiana.
- On 30 March 2010, three inmates, Quentin Truehill, Kentrell Johnson, and Peter Hughes escaped from Avoyelles Parish Sheriff's Office in Mansura, Louisiana, after holding an officer hostage. They went on a crime spree through Louisiana and Florida that included multiple robberies and thefts, and all three participated in the kidnap and murder of Florida State University grad student, Vincent Binder. They were ultimately apprehended nearly two weeks after the escape in Miami, Florida. Hughes and Johnson are currently serving life in prison for Binder's murder, and Truehill is sitting on Florida's death row for the same offense.
- Three inmates at an Arizona for-profit Management and Training Corporation-operated facility escaped on 30 July 2010. Daniel Renwick and Tracy Province were murderers and John McCluskey had been convicted of attempted murders. Renwick was captured in a shootout in Rifle, Colorado on 1 August 2010. Though he still had 32 years on his sentence in Arizona, he was sentenced to 60 years to be served in Colorado. Province, already a lifer, was captured on 9 August 2010, in Meeteetse, Wyoming. After being sentenced to 38 1/3 years in Arizona, he was quickly extradited to face murder charges in New Mexico. McCluskey, who had been doing consecutive 15-year sentences, was captured with Casslyn Welch, his cousin/accomplice, in eastern Arizona on 19 August in the Apache-Sitgreaves National Forest. He was sentenced to 43 years in an Arizona prison on escape, kidnap, hijacking, and robbery charges. Like Province, Welch, and McCluskey were soon extradited for the alleged robbery, hijack, and murder of two vacationers in New Mexico. Kenneth John Gonzales, the U.S. Attorney in New Mexico, filed death penalty charges against all three. McCluskey was convicted after a three-month trial in Albuquerque on 7 October 2013, after Province and Welch testified against him, conditions of their plea bargains. The death penalty phase of the proceedings began on 21 October, but the jury delivered a sentence of life imprisonment for McCluskey, and Province received the same. Welch was sentenced to 40 years.
- On 28 August 2012, Darnell Keith Washington escaped from the Glen Helen Rehabilitation Center in San Bernardino County, California. The escape happened with the help of his wife, and they later went on a month-long crime spree across southern California, consisting of multiple carjackings, robberies and one murder. The couple was recaptured in Washington state on 5 October, and were extradited to California. Tania was sentenced to 23-years imprisonment in May 2016, and Darnell was sentenced to death months later.
- On 27 July 2013, 1,000 inmates escaped from the Queyfiya prison near Benghazi, Libya. The escape occurred after a wave of political assassinations and attacks on political offices around the country. Local residents of Benghazi forced the inmates out of the prison.
- In October 2013, Kevin Patrick Stoeser escaped from the Austin Transitional Center where he was serving the remainder of a 156-month sentence for four counts of child sexual assault and one count of possession of child pornography. He had pleaded guilty to these charges in 2003. He was never captured, but DNA-confirmed remains of his skull were found near Del Valle, Texas, on 8 September 2014.
- On 8 June 2014, Robert Elbryan, 42, George Broussard, 64, and Christopher Boris, 52, escaped from a Quebec detention center with help from a helicopter. The three men were arrested a couple of weeks later and returned to the same facility.
- On 11 September 2014, T.J. Lane, 19, serving three life sentences for indiscriminately killing fellow students at his Ohio high school in 2012, Clifford E. Opperud, 45, serving 12 years for robbing, burglary and kidnapping, and Lindsey Bruce, 33, sentenced to life imprisonment for the murder of a 5-year-old girl, escaped Allen-Oakwood Correctional Institution by scaling a fence. Bruce was captured a few minutes after the escape, Lane was apprehended about 5 hours, and Opperud about 8 hours later.
- On 23 January 2015, a bomb went off at the Ara civil court premises in Ara, India. The bomb, brought into the premises in a handbag, went off accidentally, killing three people. In the ensuing chaos, two prisoners escaped, the bomber's intended goal.
- On 6 June 2015, Richard Matt, 48, and David Sweat, 34, were discovered missing from the Clinton Correctional Facility in Dannemora, New York, during a headcount at 5:30am. An "external breach" was found on a street approximately 500 feet south of the prison wall. Both inmates had been convicted of murder. Richard Matt was shot dead on 26 June 2015, near Lake Titus in Upstate New York. Two days later on 28 June 2015, David Sweat was captured just miles from the Canada–US border, shot twice before being taken to a local hospital.
- In June 2015, two convicts escaped maximum security in the Tihar Prison Complex in Delhi, India, by digging a tunnel under a wall and scaling it.
- On 11 July 2015, Mexican drug lord Joaquín Guzmán Loera, also known as "El Chapo", escaped from Federal Social Readaptation Center No.1, a maximum security prison. His escape involved an elaborate tunnel leading from the shower area in his cell stretching 1.5 km to a house construction site. The shower area in his cell was not detectable to the security cameras, creating a blind spot. The tunnel lay 10 meters underground and was equipped with a ladder to climb to the bottom, artificial lights, air ducts, and various construction materials. A makeshift motorcycle was found in the tunnel, believed to have been used to excavate the tons of earth removed, transport materials, and Guzmán himself. An investigation and manhunt quickly followed. He was recaptured on 8 January 2016.

=== 2016–2022 ===
- On 22 January 2016, three inmates escaped the Orange County Men's Central Jail, a maximum security jail in Orange County, California. The three inmates (Jonathan Tieu, 20; Hossein Nayeri, 37; and Bac Tien Duong, 43) cut through steel bars, made their way through plumbing tunnels, and used a makeshift rope made out of bedsheets to rappel down the multistory facility. Bac Tien Duong surrendered to police in Santa Ana on 29 January. The other two inmates, Hossein Nayeri and Jonathan Tieu were arrested in San Francisco on 30 January.
- On 7 November 2016, two inmates escaped HMP Pentonville in North London. The two inmates (Mathew Baker and James Whitlock) used diamond-tipped cutting equipment to break through cell bars before they scaled the perimeter wall. They left mannequins in their beds to fool the prison guards. Two days later, Baker was found – with dyed hair and a fractured leg – hiding under a bed at his sister's home. Whitlock was found at an address in Homerton, east London, after six days on the run.
- On 13 June 2017, two inmates shot and killed the two correctional officers transporting them and 31 other inmates between prisons in Putnam County, Georgia. They remained at large until 15 June 2017 when they were captured in Rutherford County, Tennessee.
- On 21 December 2018, Allen Todd May escaped FCI Englewood using a government work truck and a fake driver's license which he used to simply drive off the prison grounds. He was recaptured on 1 August 2023 in Fort Lauderdale, Florida.
- On 5 April 2019, about 200 the Islamic State of Iraq and the Levant detainees revolted and attempted to escape from Dêrik prison in al-Malikiyah, Syria. The breakout was foiled, and some of the prisoners were subsequently distributed to other detention centers.
- On 3 November 2019, Samuel Fonseka, 21, and Jonathan Salazar, 20, both convicted murderers, escaped from the Monterey County Jail, located in Salinas, California. The two men escaped after using a "hard-plastic" cleaning brush to knock a hole in the restroom sheetrock ceiling. The hole was in a blindspot in the communal bathroom that could only be seen by someone inside the restroom. They then escaped by going through the 11-inch-wide hole, then through a maintenance gap between walls, and finally out a hatch that was kicked open, with the cameras nearby blocked by recent construction. After they escaped, they took off their jail suits; they were wearing street clothes underneath that allowed them to blend in as they headed to Tijuana, Mexico. Fonseca and Salazar had been in rival gangs and were not known to associate with each other before being housed in the same unit of the jail. Similarly, it is unknown why the two headed for Tijuana, how they made the 7-hour trip, and why they tried to re-enter the United States from Mexico around midnight three days after their escape, only to be arrested by the U.S. Marshals on the border. Fonseca was accused of killing two men over three days in Salinas in June 2018. Salazar was arrested in the October 2017 shooting death of a Salinas man and the wounding of the man's wife while the couple drove in a Salinas neighborhood.
- On 16 April 2020, James Newman and Thomas Deering escaped the Columbia Correctional Institution in Portage, Wisconsin. They were aided in their escape by a food service worker. They were captured the following morning in Rockford, Illinois, after showing up at a homeless shelter looking for food and clothing. The founder of the shelter recognized the men and called police, stalling the escapees with coffee and cigarettes.
- On 6 September 2021, Zakaria Zubeidi and five other Palestinian militants escaped by tunnel from Gilboa Prison in Israel.
- On 1 December 2021, a group of gangsters broke into a prison in Tula, Mexico, freeing nine inmates (including a drug lord) and injuring two law enforcement officers.

=== 2022–present ===
- On 29 April 2022, Alabama murder suspect Casey White managed to escape Lauderdale County Jail aided by correctional officer Vicky White (no relation). The two were captured in Evansville, Indiana, on 9 May 2022. Vicky died hours later that day from a self-inflicted gunshot wound suffered just prior to capture.
- On 12 May 2022, Gonzalo Lopez assaulted a correctional officer while on a Texas Department of Criminal Justice prison bus and escaped from custody near Centerville, Texas. On 2 June 2022, he killed a family of five in their home after several weeks on the run. He was shot dead by law enforcement shortly afterwards.
- In May 2022, convicted murderer and rapist Thabo Bester escaped from the Mangaung Prison in South Africa.
- In November 2022, Dritan Rexhepi who has a history of escapes, broke out of a Prison in Ecuador and was apprehended by Turkish Law Enforcement in November 2023.
- On 13 December 2022, Roberto José Carmona escaped while on temporary leave to his wife's house in Córdoba, Argentina, before proceeding to kill a passing taxi driver and steal his cab. After crashing the car, he attacked and injured four others before being apprehended four hours later. Carmona had been convicted of abducting, raping and killing a teenager in 1986, and had killed two inmates in separate incidents in 1994 and 1997, respectively.
- On 1 January 2023, gunmen stormed a prison in Ciudad Juárez, Mexico, killing 10 prison guards and four inmates. Fourteen prisoners escaped after the raid.
- On 6 July 2023, Michael Burnham escaped from a prison in Warren County, Pennsylvania, he was later captured when a local dog sniffed him out in the woods in Warren County, Pennsylvania.
- At around 8:30 am on 31 August 2023, convicted murderer Danilo Cavalcante escaped Chester County Prison by chimneying up to the roof of the building. He was captured nearly two weeks later in a forested area in South Coventry, also in Chester County about 25–30 miles away.
- On 6 September 2023, terror suspect awaiting trial Daniel Khalife escaped from Wandsworth Prison in London by strapping himself to the chassis of a food delivery truck. Khalife was recaptured three days later in Northolt, West London.
- On 7 January 2024, José Adolfo Macías Villamar, leader of the organized crime group Los Choneros, escaped from prison in Guayaquil, Ecuador.
- On 2 and 3 March 2024, armed gangs attacked two prisons in Haiti, freeing thousands of prisoners.
- On 14 May 2024, an armed gang ambushed a prison convoy carrying a prisoner in Normandy, France. Two prison officers were killed and the prisoner, Mohamed Amra, was freed.
- On 18 July 2024, Graham Gomm escaped from custody whilst being transported to a hospital.
- On 2 September 2024, hundreds of prisoners attempted to escape Makala Central Prison, Kinshasa, DR Congo; it was suppressed by guards, causing 129 deaths (by gunfire and by stampede).
- On 7 September 2024, inmate Jesus Villarreal escaped from the Huntsville Unit in Huntsville Texas, and robbed a nearby gas station for an employee's car before later being caught near Corpus Christi.
- On 27 January 2025, more than 4,000 prisoners escaped from Muzenze prison in Goma, DR Congo. It was reported that hundreds of female inmates were raped and burned alive during the mass jailbreak from Goma's prison.
- On 16 May 2025, 10 inmates escaped from a New Orleans jail. Most of the escapees had been charged with murder. All 10 inmates were recaptured with the last inmate Derrick Groves captured on 8 October 2025.
- On 22 May 2025, 4 Inmates escaped from a minimum security facility in Franklin County, Ohio. They did so by smashing a window. All 4 were charged with Simple Escape.
- On 23 May 2025, Inmate Tra'Von Johson (22) escaped from Tangipahoa Parish Jail in Louisiana for the second time in a year. He was apprehended less than a day later.
- On 25 May 2025, Inmate Grant Hardin AKA "The Devil in the Ozarks" (56) escaped from Calico Rock North Central Unit in Arkansas where he was serving a prison sentence for rape and murder. He did so while disguised as a prison employee. Hardin was the former Police Chief of Gateway, Arkansas. He was apprehended 12 days later. He was then transferred to the Varner Unit, Arkansas' only Supermax Prison.
- On 27 May 2025, Inmate William D. Brainard at approximately 8:25 PM simply walked away from a work detail outside the Clara Waters Correctional Facility in Oklahoma City. His absconsion went unnoticed for several hours. He was apprehended shortly after noon the next day. He was then charged with Simple Escape.
- On 29 May 2025, Inmate Taqwa Wilson (22) was able to escape from custody at the Delaware County Courthouse in Philadelphia, Pennsylvania. He was apprehended within two hours of his escape.
- On 1 September 2025, two inmates escaped from the Washington parish jail. Both were recaptured hours later.
- On 9 September 2025, around 13,000 inmates escaped from Nepalese jails.
- On 26–27 November 2025, two inmates escaped from a jail in Dijon France. Both inmates were recaptured.
- On 13 February 2026, one inmate escaped from a prison in Shediac, New Brunswick, Canada.

== People who escaped multiple times ==
Name	#	Date	Prison name	Country	Details
Jacques Mesrine	4	1969, 17 August	Prison de Percé	CAN	
Jacques Mesrine	4	1972, 21 August	Saint-Vincent-de-Paul	CAN	
Jacques Mesrine	4	1973, 6 June	Palais de Justice Compiègne, Compiègne	FRA	
Jacques Mesrine	4	1978, 8 May	La Santé, Paris	FRA	
François Besse	7	1971, 9 May	Prison de Gradignan, Bordeaux	FRA	
François Besse	7	1974, 7 August	Prison de Gradignan, Bordeaux	FRA	
François Besse	7	1975, 20 October	Prison de Fresnes, Fresnes	FRA	
François Besse	7	1978, 8 May	La Santé, Paris	FRA	
François Besse	7	1979, 26 July	Palais de Justice, Brussels	BEL	
François Besse	7	1982, 16 February	Carabanchel Prison, Madrid	SPA	
William Patrick Alston (b. 11 March 1948)	2	1977	Kirkland Correctional Institution	USA	In both instances, Alston escaped wearing civilian clothing. From Kirkland, he disguised himself as a journalist and was able to walk out of the prison. Once becoming a Muslim, he walked out of Graterford after posing as a member of the religious organization providing services for inmates. He was apprehended at the American Embassy in Tunis after spending eleven years in Tripoli, Libya. He has also been known by a number of other names, including William Borders, Robert Berry, Robert Wayne Perry, Nafi Muhaiman Abdul Hakim, and Jafar Saidi, among others.
William Patrick Alston (b. 11 March 1948)	2	1980, 16 May	SCI Graterford	USA	
Rédoine Faïd	2	2013, 13 April	Maison d'arrêt de Lille-Sequedin	FRA	Most wanted criminal in France in 2013. Nicknamed by some as the "King of Kalashnikovs".
Rédoine Faïd	2	2018, 1 July	Prison of Réau, France	FRA	Most wanted criminal in France in 2013. Nicknamed by some as the "King of Kalashnikovs".
Clark Olofsson	6	1965, August	Juvenile detention center, Sweden	SWE	Olofsson's escapes and robberies led to the psychological description of Stockholm Syndrome
Clark Olofsson	6	1966 (Late)	Tidaholm Prison, Sweden	SWE	Olofsson's escapes and robberies led to the psychological description of Stockholm Syndrome
Clark Olofsson	6	1969, 4 February	Kumla Prison, Sweden	SWE	Olofsson's escapes and robberies led to the psychological description of Stockholm Syndrome
Clark Olofsson	6	1973, 23–28 August	Norrköping Prison, Sweden	SWE	Olofsson's escapes and robberies led to the psychological description of Stockholm Syndrome
Clark Olofsson	6	1975, 20 March	Norrköping Prison, Sweden	SWE	Olofsson's escapes and robberies led to the psychological description of Stockholm Syndrome
Clark Olofsson	6	1976, July	Norrköping Prison, Sweden	SWE	Olofsson's escapes and robberies led to the psychological description of Stockholm Syndrome
Vassilis Palaiokostas	2	2006, 4 June	Korydallos Prison, Greece	GRE	Two accomplices of Palaiokostas hijacked a sight-seeing helicopter and forced the pilot to fly to the prison where Palaiokostas was being held. Two years later, Palaiokostas was captured and sent back to prison.
Vassilis Palaiokostas	2	2009, 2 February	Korydallos Prison, Greece	GRE	Palaiokostas once again escaped from prison by helicopter.
Brian Bo Larsen	2	2005		DEN	In 2005, he succeeded in escaping by hiding in a container, with the complicity of workers from the waste collection services.
Brian Bo Larsen	2	2014	Vridsløselille prison	DEN	On 13 December 2014, he escaped for the 2nd time through the window by rope, after having sawed the bars.
Nachman Farkash	5	1960s – 1970s	Ayalon (Ramla) Prison (1960s)	ISR	
George Feigley	2	1970s	SCI- Rockview, 1976 Taylor County Jail, 1978	USA	In 1976, sex cult leader and convicted rapist George Feigley escaped from SCI- Rockview in Pennsylvania. In 1978 was recaptured in West Virginia, but soon escaped from the Taylor County Jail in Grafton. He was recaptured several months later and imprisoned at SCI – Graterford. Plans for a helicopter escape from Graterford were unearthed in 1981. In 1983 two of his followers were killed in an unsuccessful attempt to break him out of Western Penitentiary, when they drowned in a storm sewer line.
Moondyne Joe	4	1861, August	Toodyay lockup	AUS	
Moondyne Joe	4	1865, November		AUS	
Moondyne Joe	4	1866, August		AUS	
Moondyne Joe	4	1867, 7 March	Fremantle Prison	AUS	
Yoshie Shiratori	4	1936	Aomori Prison	JPN	Yoshie Shiratori (1907–1979), known as the "Showa Era escape artist". In 1983, a novel based on Shiratori's life, Hagoku (literally, Prison Break), was published by Akira Yoshimura and in 1985 the book was converted to a made-for-TV-movie by NHK, the Japan Broadcasting Corporation.
Yoshie Shiratori	4	1942	Akita Prison	JPN	Yoshie Shiratori (1907–1979), known as the "Showa Era escape artist". In 1983, a novel based on Shiratori's life, Hagoku (literally, Prison Break), was published by Akira Yoshimura and in 1985 the book was converted to a made-for-TV-movie by NHK, the Japan Broadcasting Corporation.
Yoshie Shiratori	4	1944	Abashiri Prison	JPN	Yoshie Shiratori (1907–1979), known as the "Showa Era escape artist". In 1983, a novel based on Shiratori's life, Hagoku (literally, Prison Break), was published by Akira Yoshimura and in 1985 the book was converted to a made-for-TV-movie by NHK, the Japan Broadcasting Corporation.
Yoshie Shiratori	4	1947	Sapporo Prison	JPN	Yoshie Shiratori (1907–1979), known as the "Showa Era escape artist". In 1983, a novel based on Shiratori's life, Hagoku (literally, Prison Break), was published by Akira Yoshimura and in 1985 the book was converted to a made-for-TV-movie by NHK, the Japan Broadcasting Corporation.
Jack Sheppard	4	1724, April	St Giles's Roundhouse	GBR	Sheppard (1702–1724) was a robber, burglar and thief of early 18th-century London. He was arrested and imprisoned five times in 1724 but escaped four times, making him a notorious public figure. He used knotted bed-clothes to descend to ground level during his escapes. Ultimately, he was caught, convicted, and hanged at Tyburn, ending his brief criminal career after less than two years.
Jack Sheppard	4	1724, 25 May	New Prison	GBR	Sheppard (1702–1724) was a robber, burglar and thief of early 18th-century London. He was arrested and imprisoned five times in 1724 but escaped four times, making him a notorious public figure. He used knotted bed-clothes to descend to ground level during his escapes. Ultimately, he was caught, convicted, and hanged at Tyburn, ending his brief criminal career after less than two years.
Jack Sheppard	4	1724, 31 August	Newgate Prison	GBR	Sheppard (1702–1724) was a robber, burglar and thief of early 18th-century London. He was arrested and imprisoned five times in 1724 but escaped four times, making him a notorious public figure. He used knotted bed-clothes to descend to ground level during his escapes. Ultimately, he was caught, convicted, and hanged at Tyburn, ending his brief criminal career after less than two years.
Jack Sheppard	4	1724, 15 October	Newgate Prison (the "Castle")	GBR	Sheppard (1702–1724) was a robber, burglar and thief of early 18th-century London. He was arrested and imprisoned five times in 1724 but escaped four times, making him a notorious public figure. He used knotted bed-clothes to descend to ground level during his escapes. Ultimately, he was caught, convicted, and hanged at Tyburn, ending his brief criminal career after less than two years.
Steven Jay Russell (born 1957)	4	1992, 13 May	Harris County jail	USA	He is a U.S. con artist. As of 2010, Russell, Texas Department of Criminal Justice #00760259, is in the Polunsky Unit, on 23-hour lockup, only having one free hour a day to shower and exercise, to stop him from escaping.
Steven Jay Russell (born 1957)	4	1996, 13 July	Harris County jail (2)	USA	He is a U.S. con artist. As of 2010, Russell, Texas Department of Criminal Justice #00760259, is in the Polunsky Unit, on 23-hour lockup, only having one free hour a day to shower and exercise, to stop him from escaping.
Steven Jay Russell (born 1957)	4	1996, 13 December	Maximum Security Estelle Unit in Huntsville, Texas	USA	He is a U.S. con artist. As of 2010, Russell, Texas Department of Criminal Justice #00760259, is in the Polunsky Unit, on 23-hour lockup, only having one free hour a day to shower and exercise, to stop him from escaping.
Steven Jay Russell (born 1957)	4	1998, 13 March	Maximum Security Estelle Unit (2)	USA	He is a U.S. con artist. As of 2010, Russell, Texas Department of Criminal Justice #00760259, is in the Polunsky Unit, on 23-hour lockup, only having one free hour a day to shower and exercise, to stop him from escaping.
Alfred George Hinds (1917–1991)	3	1955	Nottingham Prison	GBR	He was convicted of a jewelry robbery and sentenced to 12 years imprisonment in 1953. He escaped from Nottingham Prison after sneaking through the locked doors and over a 20-foot prison wall.
Alfred George Hinds (1917–1991)	3	1956	Law Courts in London	GBR	After his arrest, he brought a lawsuit against authorities, charging the prison commissioners with illegal arrest and used the incident to plan his next escape. He escaped but was captured at an airport five hours later.
Alfred George Hinds (1917–1991)	3	1957	Chelmsford Prison	GBR	He escaped from Chelmsford Prison less than a year later. Two years later, he was arrested after being stopped in an unregistered car.
Renato Vallanzasca	3	1976, July 2	San Vittore Prison	ITA	He was 10-year sentenced for two robberies against supermarkets. He escaped from hospital with a complacent policeman's help while he served only 4 years of his sentence. 7 months later, was arrested in an accomplice's house
Renato Vallanzasca	3	1980, April 28	San Vittore Prison	ITA	Recaptured minutes after unleashing a shooting while he was escaping from that Milan prison.
Renato Vallanzasca	3	1987, July 18	Genova Prison	ITA	He managed to escape during transferring prison from Genova to Asinara prison and was hidden until he was recaptured 20 days later in a traffic control post at Trieste.
Collen Chauke (1970–2003)	3	1993	Johannesburg Prison	RSA	He was convicted of car theft and sentenced to four years imprisonment. He escaped from prison after serving only one month of his sentence.
Collen Chauke (1970–2003)	3	1997	Pretoria Prison	RSA	He was found guilty of robbing R12.6-million from a depot of the SBV security company in Pretoria in October 1997. He managed to escape from Pretoria prison with five others in December 1997.
Collen Chauke (1970–2003)	3	1998	Pretoria Prison	RSA	He escaped from prison and managed to evade the police for a year until he was recaptured in 1999 in Nelspruit.
Richard Lee McNair (born 1958)	3	1988	Minot municipal police station	USA	He used lip balm to squeeze out of handcuffs.
Richard Lee McNair (born 1958)	3	1992, October	North Dakota State Penitentiary	USA	He escaped by crawling through a ventilation duct.
Richard Lee McNair (born 1958)	3	2006, 5 April	United States Penitentiary, Pollock	USA	He escaped by hiding in a pallet of used mailbags. McNair was captured in October 2007 in Canada and is now held at the ADX Florence supermax facility in Colorado.
Willie Sutton (1901–1980)	3	1932, 11 December	Sing Sing	USA	He was an American named "The Actor" and "Slick Willie". In June 1931, he was sentenced to 30 years on charges of assault and robbery. He escaped on 11 December 1932 by scaling the prison wall on two 9-foot sections of ladder that were joined. Sutton was apprehended on 5 February 1934 and was sentenced to serve 25–50 years in Eastern State Penitentiary for a machine gun robbery of the Corn Exchange Bank.
Willie Sutton (1901–1980)	3	1945, 3 April	Eastern State Penitentiary	USA	He was one of 12 convicts who escaped the institution through a tunnel. He was recaptured the same day by Philadelphia police officers, his fifth escape attempt at this prison. Sentenced to life imprisonment as a fourth-time offender, he was transferred to the Philadelphia County Prison.
Willie Sutton (1901–1980)	3	1947, 10 February	Philadelphia County Prison	USA	He and other prisoners dressed as prison guards and escaped via ladders across the prison yard to the wall.
Pascal Payet	2	2001, 12 October	Luynes prison	FRA	Payet (born 1963) is a French criminal who gained notoriety for his daring prison escapes using helicopters. He was initially sentenced to a 30-year jail term for a murder committed during the robbery of a security van in 1997. He escaped two times with a helicopter. After his second escape, he was captured on 21 September 2007.
Pascal Payet	2	2007, 14 July	Prison in Grasse	FRA	Payet (born 1963) is a French criminal who gained notoriety for his daring prison escapes using helicopters. He was initially sentenced to a 30-year jail term for a murder committed during the robbery of a security van in 1997. He escaped two times with a helicopter. After his second escape, he was captured on 21 September 2007.
John Dillinger (1903–1934)	2	1933, 13 October	Allen County Jail	USA	He was a notorious bank robber who operated throughout the Midwest during the Great Depression. He broke out of the Allen County Jail in Lima, Ohio by having his gang pose as officers and infiltrate the prison. Only a few months later, the gang was re-captured when the hotel they were staying in caught fire. He was incarcerated while waiting to stand trial for the murder of a police officer in a bank robbery.
John Dillinger (1903–1934)	2	1934, 3 March	Lake County Jail	USA	Officials boasted that the Lake County Jail in Crown Point, Indiana was escape-proof and posted extra guards, but he escaped using a fake gun.
Richard Matt (1967–2015)	2	1986, 13 October	Erie County Correction Facility	USA	In 1986, at age 19, Matt was convicted and sentenced to a year in jail. The term was interrupted when Matt, taking advantage of a guard's mistake, slipped out of his cell, scaled a 9-foot brick and metal wall topped with razor wire and hopped a freight train to his brother's house in Tonawanda. Five days later, police officers found him brandishing an ax handle in his brother's apartment.
Richard Matt (1967–2015)	2	2015, 6 June	Clinton Correctional Facility	USA	On 6 June 2015, inmates Richard Matt and David Sweat, both serving sentences for murder, escaped from the facility. A prison employee, Joyce Mitchell, was charged with aiding their escape. Matt was shot and killed by police on 26 June 2015.
Jiří Kajínek (born 1961)	4	1993, 18 January	Pilsen, prison Bory	CZE	After being allowed a two days leave from prison between 21 and 23 January 1993, Kájinek simply did not return and remained on the run for over a year. During this period a double murder happened, which he was later convicted of and given life imprisonment for, although Kájinek never admitted to committing it. This incident and later prison escapes made him nationally famous and resulted in him receiving a presidential pardon.
Jiří Kajínek (born 1961)	4	1994, 3 July	České Budějovice Remand Prison	CZE	Recaptured the same day by the river Vltava.
Jiří Kajínek (born 1961)	4	1996, 11 September	Valdice prison	CZE	Escaped using the prisons rooftops and found after a 20 minute search, on a second story building.
Jiří Kajínek (born 1961)	4	2000, 29 October	Maximum security prison Mírov	CZE	According to Kájinek he was originally supposed to escape with Martin Vlasák, who he befriended in Mírov. He is later recaptured in the apartment of the wife of a convicted 5-time murderer and member of the Orlík killers. This is the second ever successful escape from the prison after three other men escaped in 1976.
Joaquín Guzmán Loera (born 1954 or 1957)	2	2001, 19 January	"Puente Grande" Federal Center for Social Rehabilitation No. 2	MEX	On 19 January 2001, Francisco "El Chito" Camberos Rivera, a prison guard, opened Guzmán's electronically operated cell door, and Guzmán got in a laundry cart that maintenance worker Javier Camberos rolled through several doors and eventually out the front door. He was then transported in the trunk of a car driven by Camberos out of the town. The escape allegedly cost Guzmán $2.5 million.
Joaquín Guzmán Loera (born 1954 or 1957)	2	2015, 11 July	"Altiplano" Federal Social Readaptation Center No. 1	MEX	In his second escape from the prison, he escaped through a tunnel leading from the shower area to a home construction site 1.5 km (0.9 mi) away in a Santa Juanita neighborhood. The tunnel was 1.7 m (5.7 ft) tall and 75 cm (30 in) in width. It was equipped with artificial light, air conditioning, and high-quality construction materials.
Frank Abagnale (born 1948)	2		British VC-10 airliner (while deporting)	USA	
Frank Abagnale (born 1948)	2	1971, April	Federal Detention Center, Atlanta, Georgia	USA	
Philip Andrew Marshall	6	2018, 19 February	Bedford County Jail, Shelbyville, Tennessee	USA	Escaped six times over the years.
Zdzisław Najmrodzki (1954–1995)	2	1980, 23 July	Gliwice Prison	POL	Najmrodzki was a famous robber and thief, known for escaping 29 times from prison and the authorities. He was one of the most wanted criminals in the Polish People's Republic.
Zdzisław Najmrodzki (1954–1995)	2	1989, 3 September	Gliwice Prison	POL	Najmrodzki was a famous robber and thief, known for escaping 29 times from prison and the authorities. He was one of the most wanted criminals in the Polish People's Republic.
José Adolfo Macías Villamar (born 1979)	2	2013, February	La Roca, the maximum security prison in Guayas Penitentiary Complex	ECU	Macías was on the run with 17 others until being caught in May 2013.
José Adolfo Macías Villamar (born 1979)	2	2024, 7 January	La Regional prison in the Guayas Penitentiary Complex	ECU	This prison escape initiated the 2024 conflict in Ecuador.
Antoine Massey (born June 15, 1992)	3	2007	Youth Study Center	USA	Massey and 6 other juveniles escaped from the Youth Study Center. He was found on Interstate 10 in New Orleans.
Antoine Massey (born June 15, 1992)	3	2019	Morehouse Detention Center	USA	Massey and another inmate, Treg Wesley, escaped from the Morehouse Detention Center in Monroe, Louisiana. They were caught a day later in Lancaster, Texas.
Antoine Massey (born June 15, 1992)	3	2025, 16 May	Orleans Parish Prison	USA	Massey and 10 other inmates escaped from the Orleans Parish Prison. Massey was caught on June 27, 2025.
Tra'Von Johnson (22)	2	May 2024	Tangipahoa Parish Jail	USA	Johnson and four others broke through the perimeter fence during recreation time. Johnson was quickly apprehended with another escapee while hiding behind a Dollar Store's dumpster.
Tra'Von Johnson (22)	2	May 2025	Tangipahoa Parish Jail	USA	Inmates flooded their dorm-style confinement, which resulted in a door being propped open to allow for airflow to assist in drying. Inmates Tre'Von Johnson and Trevon Wallace then used the opportunity to slip out of the dorm and into the yard, where Wallace assisted Johnson over the fence. Wallace was charged with Simple Escape. Johnson was quickly recaptured along with associate Dameon Booth, who was then charged as an accessory after the fact.
Triệu Quân Sự (born 1991, July 14)	4	2014	T10 Prison Camp	VIE	
Triệu Quân Sự (born 1991, July 14)	4	2015, 8 November	T10 Prison Camp	VIE	
Triệu Quân Sự (born 1991, July 14)	4	2020, 3 June	T10 Prison Camp	VIE	
Triệu Quân Sự (born 1991, July 14)	4	2022, 31 May	T-974 Prison Camp	VIE	
Gilberto Ventura Ceballos	3	2005, 30 November	Najayo Prison	Dominican Republic	On the 30th of November 2004, Gilberto Ventura Ceballos managed to escape from Najayo Prison in San Cristóbal, Dominican Republic, while being held on kidnapping and weapons charges.
Gilberto Ventura Ceballos	3	2016, December 28	La Joyita Prison	Panama	Ventura Ceballos escaped from La Joyita Prison on 28 of December 2016 with the help of Angie Smith, who posed as a lawyer. Ceballos disguised himself by cross-dressing and simply walked out the door of the prison kitchen.
Gilberto Ventura Ceballos	3	2020, February 3	La Joyita Prison	Panama	On 3 February 2020, Gilberto Ventura Ceballos, while serving a 55-year prison sentence for five murders and a previous prison escape, managed to escape from prison again by cutting through the bars of his cell and using a makeshift rope made from his bedsheet to pass through the frame of the prison and reach the roof, where he then cut through the wires of the perimeter fence in order to escape.

== See also ==
- List of helicopter prison escapes
- List of prisoner-of-war escapes
