= Alfred Hinds =

Alfred Hinds may refer to:

- Alfred George Hinds (1917–1991), British criminal
- Alfred Walton Hinds (1874–1957), US Navy Captain who served as the 17th Naval Governor of Guam
