= Piedras Negras jail escape =

1976 prison break in Mexico

The Piedras Negras jail escape took place on 11 March 1976 in Piedras Negras, Mexico, when several prisoners escaped after former United States Marine Corps sergeant Don Fielden and an accomplice overpowered the guards at gunpoint in an effort to release fellow American citizen Blake Davis. Although the men made it back over the Mexico–United States border without being captured, Fielden and his co-conspirators were later charged in the state of Texas with violating weapons exportation laws in relation to their actions. The Piedras Negras jail break caused a minor diplomatic incident between the governments of Mexico and the United States of America, and remains the only known example of a cross-border raid on a Mexican detention center by American citizens.

== Background ==
In 1974, after recently being released on parole from a federal penitentiary in Arizona in relation to the seizure of 350 kilograms of marijuana, 27-year-old American citizen Blake Davis was arrested near the northeastern Mexican city of Saltillo for drug trafficking and eventually charged with possession with intent to supply of approximately 80 kilograms of marijuana. Davis would later claim to have been forced by the Policía Federal to sign a confession written in Spanish that he didnt understand, resulting in him being sentenced to 10 years imprisonment. After being caught attempting to tunnel out of the local prison, in August 1975 Davis was transferred to Piedras Negras municipal jail. Conditions at the jail were harsh, with up to 12 prisoners crammed into windowless cells measuring eight feet by nine. The unsanitary conditions and lack of decent food resulted in Davis losing 25 pounds in weight and developing numerous skin infections all over his body.

After learning of his arrest, Blake's father Sterling Blake Davis Senior attempted numerous legal methods to secure his release from incarceration, however after learning that there was technically no law against breaking someone out of prison in Mexico he began canvasing the Dallas underworld for anyone willing to mount an armed raid on the Piedras Negras jail. On 16 February 1976, Davis Senior interviewed 29-year-old former truck driver and Vietnam veteran Don Fielden, who had served with the Marine Corps and was awarded the Purple Heart after being severely injured in a rocket attack near the V-DMZ. Fielden agreed to attempt the jail break for US$5000 plus expenses if the mission was a success.

== Raid on Piedras Negras jail ==
Locations
1 Piedras Negras jail
2 U.S. Border Gates

Fielden then moved to Eagle Pass, which was directly across the border from Piedras Negras, in order to perform reconnaissance on the surrounding areas. The jail itself was only three blocks from the International Bridge border crossing, and was located on a narrow one way street heading east. Fielden visited Davis at the Piedras Negras jail during visitors’ day and observed the cells were secured with simple padlocks, and decided that mid-week would be the best time to attempt an escape to minimize the number of officers guarding prisoners held in the drunk tank. Realizing he needed an accomplice, Fielden recruited 32-year-old Dallas criminal Mike Hill in early March, who in turn hired a teenager named Billy Blackwell to act as a lookout.

The three men thereafter checked into an Eagle Pass motel on Veterans Boulevard, and on Thursday 11th March 1976 Blackwell walked across the border at 2 a.m. into Mexico. Contacting him via walkie talkie a few minutes later, Fielden was informed that there was increased activity around the jail, however he and Hill decided to drive across regardless. Eventually Blackwell reported that a car with six police officers had just left, and after picking him up Fielden parked their getaway car outside the jail itself. Just after 3 a.m., Fielden and Hill put on ski masks and armed themselves with a sawn off shotgun and a pump action shotgun, then immediately rushed into the jail.

Although they expected only a few guards to be working the nightshift, unbeknownst to them the local authorities had just arrested a suspected member of the Liga Comunista 23 de Septiembre terrorist group, thus the prison was unexpectedly packed with federal officers.Inside the front lobby the men disarmed five prison guards and five police officers, and while Hill held them hostage Fielden attempted to remove the locks on the doors leading to the prisoners with bolt cutters. When this was unsuccessful, Fielden forced a guard at gunpoint to recover the keys from the front desk and then opened the cell containing Blake. The men then forced the ten guards and police officers into the cell, before opening all of the other cells and releasing at least twenty other prisoners. Hill then handed Blake an M1 carbine discovered behind the front desk, advised the other prisoners to turn right outside and run for the Rio Grande river, then brought Blake to the getaway car outside. After stashing Hill's pump action in the trunk, the men then calmly drove towards the border and threw the two other guns and their ski masks over the bridge railing before they entered the United States without incident.

== Aftermath ==
After being alerted to the prison break by Mexican Federal officers, the Maverick County Sheriff Department recovered Fielden's sawn-off shotgun and the Mexican M1 rifle ten feet from the river on the American side of the border. Local law enforcement also rounded up a number of American escapees (20 year old Pasqual Narvear Uriegas from Ozona, Texas, 20 year old Jeffrey Andrew Garafola from San Francisco, 29 year old Dale Chenoweth from Moss, Mississippi, 23 year old Kari Kristine Jorgensen from Georgetown, Missouri, 31 year old Paul Nesinson of Minneapolis, and 26 year old Jim Rodgers of Evergreen, Colorado) however they were all released after 72 hours as no U.S. charges were pending against them.

Blake Davis surrendered to Federal Marshals expecting to be questioned and then released, however he was instead arrested for parole violations and remanded to El Reno federal prison in Oklahoma. After being approached by reporters, Fielden gave a detailed interview about the raid to the Dallas Times Herald, which was printed in early May 1976. The following day, Hill appeared in a ski mask on KDFW evening news to recount his role in the incident, while Sterling Blake Davis Senior also admitted orchestrating the operation to UPI journalists.

On 13 May 1976, Fielden was charged with the illegal exportation of a sawed-off shotgun to Mexico and released on bond, with Hill facing the same charges on the following day. On 18 May 1976, Fielden, Hill, Blake Davis and his father Blake Davis Senior were all summoned to a federal grand jury in San Antonio in relation to the prison escape in Piedras Negras. Fielden immediately cut a deal with the federal authorities to turn state's evidence against his co-accused and plead guilty to conspiracy to obtain the sawn-off shotgun, where as the elder Davis, Hill, and Blackwell were charged with international gunrunning and scheduled to face trial at Del Rio courthouse on 21 September 1976.

Mike Hill was eventually convicted of the possession and export of illegal firearms (Fielden's sawn off) and unlawfully importing a firearm (his own pump action) into the United States, while Blake Davis Senior was convicted for possession of illegal firearms and conspiracy to export a weapon on the Munitions List without an export license, whereas Billy Blackwell was acquitted of all charges. However, in November 1978 the United States Court of Appeals for the Fifth Circuit quashed the illegal export convictions of Davis and Hill on a series of legal technicalities:

- although Fielden had informed Blake Davis Senior that a shotgun would be used in the jailbreak, he did not specifically describe that its barrel had been sawn off to under 18 inches in length, therefore he did not have prior knowledge of its illegality
- the original trial judge erred in denying Hill's legal team's request to examine each jury member individually regarding their opinions on pre-trial media coverage of the jailbreak, which were sensationalized to highlight the use of firearms to free prisoners being held for drug trafficking offences

== See also ==
- List of prison escapes
- Assault of Ayacucho prison
- Dwight Worker
