= Darnell Keith Washington =

American murderer on death row

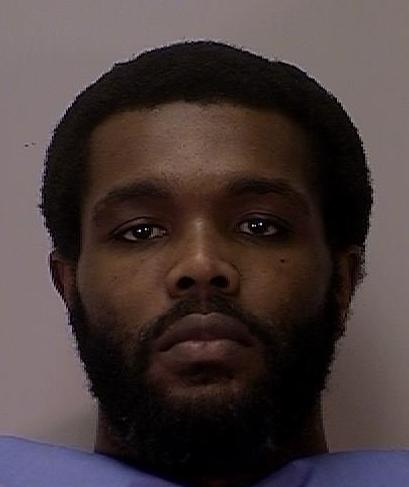
- Washington in 2017
- Born: 1988 or 1989 (age 36–37)
- Height: 6 ft (1.8 m)
- Spouse: Tania Washington
- Conviction: First degree murder with special circumstances
- Penalty: Death

Details
- Span of crimes: August 28 – October 5, 2012
- Country: United States
- State: California
- Killed: Susie Ko
- Injured: John Marquez
- Date apprehended: October 5, 2012
- Imprisoned at: San Quentin State Prison

Darnell Keith Washington (born 1988/1989) is an American convicted murderer, robber, and carjacker. In 2012, he escaped from the Glen Helen Rehabilitation Center where he was awaiting trial for armed robbery, later joining his wife in a crime spree consisting of multiple robberies, carjackings, the shooting of a police deputy, and the murder of a retired school teacher. Upon their arrest, Washington was convicted and sentenced to death.

== Crimes ==
=== Original jailing and escape ===
In August 2012, Darnell Washington was arrested for armed robbery and receiving stolen property. While awaiting his upcoming trial, which was scheduled for September 14, Washington was housed at the Glen Helen Rehabilitation Center in San Bernardino County. On August 28, his wife Tania Washington visited him, and helped Darnell scale up a 10-foot high fence, which he jumped over and escaped.

=== Crime spree and capture ===
After the guards realized Washington had escaped, an alert was put out for information on his whereabouts, with a physical description dispatched with his height at 6-foot-1 and his weight at around 185 pounds. On September 2, at around 9 a.m. in South El Monte, Darnell and Tania were pulled over by Los Angeles County sheriff's Deputy John Marquez, who noticed them driving suspiciously. Upon calling Darnell out, Darnell exited the vehicle and shot Marquez with a shotgun before fleeing. Marquez was wounded, but survived. A little while later, the couple carjacked a nearby vehicle, before abandoning it in South Gate, and later stealing another vehicle, according to some reports alleging it as a 1996 Plymouth Grand Voyager.

On September 20, The Los Angeles County District Attorney's Office filed a warrant for the couple's arrest. A week later, the couple robbed a Kmart in Pinole, fleeing the scene in a stolen pickup truck. On October 5, the couple invaded the home of 55-year-old Susie Ko, a retired schoolteacher and a mother of four living in Hercules. According to the later convictions, it was Darnell who stabbed Ko a total of 21 times until her death, before stealing her car, a 2011 Subaru Outback, and attempting to flee up north. The couple wound up in Washington, where they were arrested in the suburb of SeaTac in Seattle.

== Trial and sentencing ==
Since the pair were found in possession of Ko's vehicle, an immediate link was distinguished between the couple and her murder. On December 7, 2012, Darnell and Tania made their first court appearances, with charges ranging from the auto thefts to the first-degree murder of Ko. Both pleaded not guilty. They were also charged with the jailbreak that lead to the crime spree, and with the attempted murder of Marquez. While awaiting trial, Darnell attempted another escape, carving out his cell window and making a rope out of his bedsheets, but was unable to make it out.

Darnell's trial began in August 2016. Tania accepted a plea from authorities, pleading guilty to voluntary manslaughter, and was sentenced to 23 years and 4 months in prison. She agreed to testify against her husband during his trial. During the trial, the defense attempted to sway the jury that it was Tania who killed Ko, presenting evidence that Ko's killer was most likely in a panic, which did not match up with what was known about Darnell's personality. The prosecution, on the other hand, refuted this claim and presented the knife that was used to kill Ko, which was found to have contained Darnell's DNA on it. In September 2016, the jury found Darnell guilty of Ko's murder, on the basis of which two months later he was sentenced to death.

== See also ==
- List of death row inmates in the United States
- List of prison escapes
