= William Scott Day =

American spree killer

- Mugshot of Day in 2003
- Born: October 21, 1951; Japan
- Died: February 4, 2006 (aged 54); West Tennessee State Penitentiary, Henning, Tennessee, U.S.
- Other names: Roger Willis; Tom Wilkins
- Convictions: First degree murder Aggravated kidnapping Armed robbery
- Penalty: Life imprisonment x3

Details
- Victims: 6–8 (one conviction)
- Span of crimes: December 9, 1986 – January 12, 1987
- Country: United States
- States: Tennessee, Arizona, Florida, Texas, Louisiana
- Date apprehended: January 12, 1987

William Scott Day (October 21, 1951 – February 4, 2006) was an American prison escapee and later spree killer who killed at least six people in five states during his 39 days on the run between December 1986 and January 1987. He was convicted and sentenced to life imprisonment on one count in Tennessee, and the other charges were dropped altogether.

== Early life and crimes ==
William Scott Day was born on an American military installation in Japan on October 21, 1951, while his family was residing there. From an early age, he showed signs of remarkable intelligence and an affinity for reading authors such as Oscar Wilde, Walt Whitman and Barbara W. Tuchman. After the death of his father during his teens, Day moved to Michigan, where he enlisted in the Marine Corps and was stationed at a boot camp near Flat Rock. While there, he deserted his position and went to the city, where he was later arrested for attempting to rape and kidnap a woman. Day was convicted of this crime and given a 7-year term, served initially at the Richard A. Handlon Correctional Facility and later transferred to the Ionia Correctional Facility, successfully escaping once before being paroled in 1974.

Between 1976 and 1982, Day was repeatedly arrested and incarcerated for various offenses including heroin possession, theft, kidnapping and writing bad checks, successfully escaping on one occasion. In late 1982, Day escaped from yet another prison camp in Caro, and thereafter kidnapped an 80-year-old woman, whom he robbed and then tied to a tree. He was arrested and given an additional 7-year sentence, which he was to serve at the Michigan State Prison in Jackson. However, as he suffered from depression, Day was transferred for temporary treatment at the Center For Forensic Psychiatry in Ypsilanti. During his stay, he was described as a model patient who frequently played chess with employees and even helped break up assaults by other patients. Through these activities, he became friendly with 36-year-old security worker Thomas Frederick Fortunato, a veteran employee of 14 years who was assigned to the center's C-43 ward, which was notorious for housing violent inmates.

=== Escape from prison ===
Approximately two weeks before Day was scheduled to be returned to Jackson, he started to question Fortunato on whether he could help him escape from prison. While he initially treated this as a joke, Day continued to insist, eventually succeeding in manipulating Fortunato to aid him in his escape plan. While his reason for doing so has not been conclusively established, it was suspected that Fortunato was either drawn in by Day's charming personality or the promise of a more exciting life as a fugitive. Another theory suggests that it was done out of frustration for the center's handling of patients in the C-43 ward, amidst a supposed AIDS outbreak. As per Day's instructions, Fortunato drove to Toledo, Ohio and rented a car there, which he left in front of a General Motors factory's parking lot. He then attempted to gather a large sum of money to be used on their future trip, but Fortunato was only able to withdraw $5,000 from his bank account.

On December 4, 1986, a day before Day was scheduled to be returned to Jackson, Fortunato was assigned to the prison laundry. In the early morning, he let Day hide in a laundry cart and then escorted him out of the facility, before he left it as well under the guise of supposedly showing a new employee a tour of the facility. Once outside, the two men entered Fortunato's truck and drove to Toledo, where they got into the rental car and drove to Louisville, Kentucky, where they rented a motel room and spent the night partying. On the following morning, while Fortunato was taking a shower, Day stole most of their money and the car and fled, leaving his accomplice behind. Fortunato, who was left with only $50 and the clothes on his back, got on a bus bound for Mobile, Alabama in an attempt to catch up with Day, but after he failed, he hitchhiked his way to Tampa, Florida and spent several days in homeless shelters before turning himself in to FBI agents on December 11. Up until that point, it was suspected that he had been kidnapped by Day, but Fortunato admitted to aiding his prison escape. He would later plead no contest to the charges of helping Day's escape, and was sentenced to a 2-years-and-a-half sentence for his complicity.

== Murders ==
After abandoning the rental car in Louisville, Day bought a bus ticket for Nashville, Tennessee. On December 9, he came across 74-year-old Mary Catherine Strobel, a prominent local volunteer worker who was on her way to deliver a sack of potatoes to a rescue mission. After offering to drive her home in her car, a 1981 AMC Concord, which she gladly accepted. After driving her around for some time and narrowly avoiding arrest by a traffic police officer, Day stopped the car and informed Strobel that he intended to tie her up. Frightened she began to scream, causing a panicked Day to draw a knife and stab her, before strangling her to make sure she was dead. He then put the woman's body in the trunk of the car, parked it in front of the rescue mission and then bought a ticket at the nearby Greyhound bus station.

Day then travelled cross-country until he eventually reached San Antonio, Texas, where he met 76-year-old Roberto Arzapalo-Alcoser, a retired Mexican mechanic en route to celebrate Christmas with his daughters, who lived in California. The two men befriended each other and drank beer together at a bar in El Paso. While their bus was en route to Tucson, Arizona, Day noticed that his companion had a sewn pouch on his jacket, which Arzapalo-Alcoser claimed contained $2,000. After they reached Tucson, Day lured Arzapalo-Alcoser to the back of the bus station, where he beat up the elderly man, slamming his body into a nearby metal transformer, before he stole the pouch, leaving him with only $40 in cash and his passport. Arzapalo-Alcoser was still alive when located, but later died from his injuries in the hospital.

After spending Christmas entertaining a group of Taiwanese college students in San Diego, treating them with visits to the zoo and a holiday dinner, Day returned to the East Coast, finding himself in Marianna, Florida in early January. On January 2, he entered a pawn shop on Market Street and killed the clerk, 55-year-old Evan Johnson, then robbed the store of all valuables he could carry. On his way out, while he was turning the sign around to say 'CLOSED', Day was confronted by a police sergeant who inquired about what he was doing. Day claimed that he was Johnson's cousin and that he was temporarily closing the store, as the former was out having lunch with a friend. While the sergeant suspected that something was not quite right, he had no reason to arrest Day and allowed him to leave. Day then got on a bus headed for New Orleans, Louisiana, getting off at a temporary stop in Pensacola to watch the 1987 Fiesta Bowl game. On January 6, he passed through Fort Stockton, Texas, where he beat and stabbed to death a woman named Billie Taylor, whose body he left beside the road.

On the following day, Day arrived in New Orleans and went to relax at a lounge in the French Quarter, where he met 27-year-old Andrew McClelland. Originally from Morgan City, McClelland was in New Orleans for a job interview when he came across Day, who offered to share his room at the Sheranton Inn in Gretna. The day after, McClelland's body was found in the room by a housekeeper, having been stabbed numerous times. Day had stolen his car and driven to Mobile, Alabama, where he left it parked next to a bus station.

== Arrest, trial and imprisonment ==
On January 12, Day went to the trailer home of 53-year-old Stanley Robertson, whom he bludgeoned and stabbed to death before slashing his throat. He then stole his 1985 Ford Merkur and sped off, only for the vehicle's tire to blow off on the highway near Van Horn. The incident was noticed by highway patrolman Jimmy Nail, who stopped to question the driver. Day, presenting himself as one "Tom Wilkins", claimed that he was driving his uncle Stanley's truck to El Paso to look for work, after having dropped the uncle at a local bar. Nail had heard on the police dispatch that a liquor store had been robbed recently and the 67-year-old clerk, Dorothy Alexander, had been pistol-whipped by the assailant. Unmoved by Day's explanations, he arrested him, and upon a closer inspection, he noticed that the driver's clothes were splattered with blood.

Day was interned at the county jail to be questioned by the sheriff, Clifford Bare, about the recent holdup. However, before Bare could begin to ask questions, Day waived his rights to an attorney and confessed not only to the hold-up, but claimed that he had escaped a mental health facility in Michigan and had killed 8 people during his 39 days on the run. After getting into contact with authorities from various neighboring states, Day was conclusively linked to six of the claimed homicides, which in themselves were matched by his travel route and weapons used.

While awaiting murder charges at the jail in Fort Stockton, Texas, Day was indicted by the authorities in Nashville for Strobel's murder. In an exclusive interview with The Nashville Banner, Day admitted to all of the murders, but claimed that he was high on drugs and drunk at the time, rendering him unable to control his actions. Fearing that his client would face the death penalty if he remained in Texas, Day's attorney, John Smith, announced that he would not appeal Tennessee's extradition request, as they had indicated they would pursue a life term instead. Upon his arrival there, Day's attorneys requested a change of venue to a neighboring county, claiming that the extensive coverage of the Strobel murder in Nashville would prejudice the jurors. In response to this, Justice Walter Kurtz expressed skepticism, saying that the attorney's claims of it reaching publicity heights like those of Sam Sheppard or Billie Sol Estes were simply ridiculous. During questionings conducted by the court, several jurors did indeed admit to knowing about Day's other murders, for which they had to be excused from jury duty.

After a two-week long trial, Day was convicted on all counts. However, he was given three life sentences after the jury deadlocked 7-5 against a death sentence. The sentence came as a relief to Strobel's family members, who opposed capital punishment due to their religious beliefs. The Strobel family have since dedicated themselves for advocating against the death penalty being used against mentally-ill inmates.

== Death ==
Day died in prison from natural causes at the West Tennessee State Penitentiary on February 4, 2006, at the age of 54.

== See also ==
- List of prison escapes
