= Triệu Quân Sự =

Vietnamese criminal (born 1991)

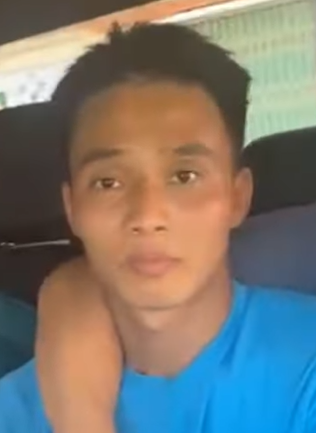
- Triệu Quân Sự in 2022
- Born: 14 July 1991 (age 35); Phú Cường, Đại Từ, Thái Nguyên, Vietnam
- Convictions: First-degree murder; Theft; Attempted first-degree murder; Desertion; Prison escape
- Penalty: Life imprisonment
- Escaped: 2014; 8 November 2015 – 15 December 2015; 3 June 2020 – 18 December 2020; 31 May 2022 – 1 June 2022

Details
- Span of crimes: 2012–2022
- Killed: 1
- Injured: 1
- Imprisoned at: Detention Camp T10, Bình Sơn, Quảng Ngãi (15 March 2013 – 3 June 2020); T-974 Prison Camp, Thạch Thành, Thanh Hóa (18 December 2020 – present)

Triệu Quân Sự (born 14 July 1991) is a Vietnamese criminal convicted of multiple crimes, who is currently serving a life sentence for murder, robbery and deserting from the Vietnam People's Army. Sự is known for escaping from prison four times, in 2014, 2015, 2020, and 2022, and committing a major number of thefts before being detained again in 2022.

== Early life ==
Quân Sự was born in 1991 in Phú Cường commune, Đại Từ district, Bắc Thái province (now Thái Nguyên province), Vietnam. He is the eldest son in a Nùng family with two younger brothers. Sự dropped out of school at the age of 15 due to his family's financial difficulties. During this time, Sự was addicted to gambling and games. In 2011, Sự was conscripted into the Vietnam People's Army and assigned to Military Region 1 in Bắc Giang Province. He served as a private in Company 1, Battalion 18, Division 3. During his military service, he repeatedly deserted without permission and frequently stole military equipment to sell for money.

== Murder ==
On 12 August 2012, Sự deserted from his unit for the fifth time and travelled to Hanoi, where he planned to commit robbery. On 22 August, when he entered the Hương Sen coffee shop in Long Biên district, the only other person present there was the owner of the shop, Phạm Thị Xuân Hoa; Sự killed her with a folding knife, then stole her jewellery and money. Sự then threw his shirt and the knife into the Red River, sold some stolen phones and used the proceeds to ride a bus to Tuyên Quang. He later sold the ring which he had stolen from the shop's owner for 12 million VND ($457.58) and traveled to Thái Nguyên to sell the earrings. After spending all the money, Sự decided to return to his hometown and stayed at a motel in Yên Lãng commune, Đại Từ district. Through a close friend of Sự, the police raided the motel and took him to the police station on the afternoon of 29 August.

On 15 March 2013, Sự was sentenced to life in prison at the court on the three charges of murder, robbery, and desertion. The jewelry that Sự sold was later recovered by the Hanoi City Police and Thai Nguyen Provincial Police. During this time, Sự was held at the Central Military Detention Camp (Detention Camp T10) in Bình Sơn District, Quảng Ngãi Province.

== Escapes ==
=== 2014 ===
In 2014, while serving his sentence at the Detention Camp T10 for previous offenses, Triệu Quân Sự took advantage of a break during work hours to escape. He climbed over the camp fence but was caught shortly after. As a result, on 26 December, he was sentenced to an additional three years for escaping from prison.

=== 2015 ===
While in the cell, Sự and his roommate Nhâm Văn Tuấn (born 1985), planned a prison break after stealing a saw blade while working at the prison sawmill. To hide the saw marks while cutting the prison bars, the two mixed rice with soil and plastered the mixture over the cuts. In the early morning of 8 November 2015, taking advantage of heavy rain and noise from a nearby wood workshop, Sự and Tuấn escaped by cutting the iron bars of their cell and climbing over the prison fence. After escaping from the prison, they stole clothes from nearby residents and then took a bus to flee. After reaching Đồng Nai Province, Tuấn parted ways with Sự and went to Cambodia, while Sự travelled to northern Vietnam.

Following the escape, the Bình Khương Commune then issued a notice about the prisoners. In response, hundreds of police officers and soldiers were deployed to search the surrounding area. The Criminal Investigation Department of the Ministry of Public Security quickly established a special task force to catch the escapees. Later, on the afternoon of 15 December that year, Sự was arrested while playing games at an internet café in Nam Từ Liêm District, Hanoi. Earlier, Major Bùi Đức Đạo of the General Department of Logistics, Ministry of National Defense, observed Sự stealing from a mobile phone shop in Hanoi one evening and followed him. When confronted, Sự suddenly rushed out, pulled a knife and stabbed Đạo in the stomach; he then stole high-value items from the shop and fled while the major was later found by bystanders and taken to the hospital. After being arrested, Sự also admitted to committing multiple thefts, including the robbery of 13 smartphones in Sóc Sơn District, Hanoi.

=== 2020 ===
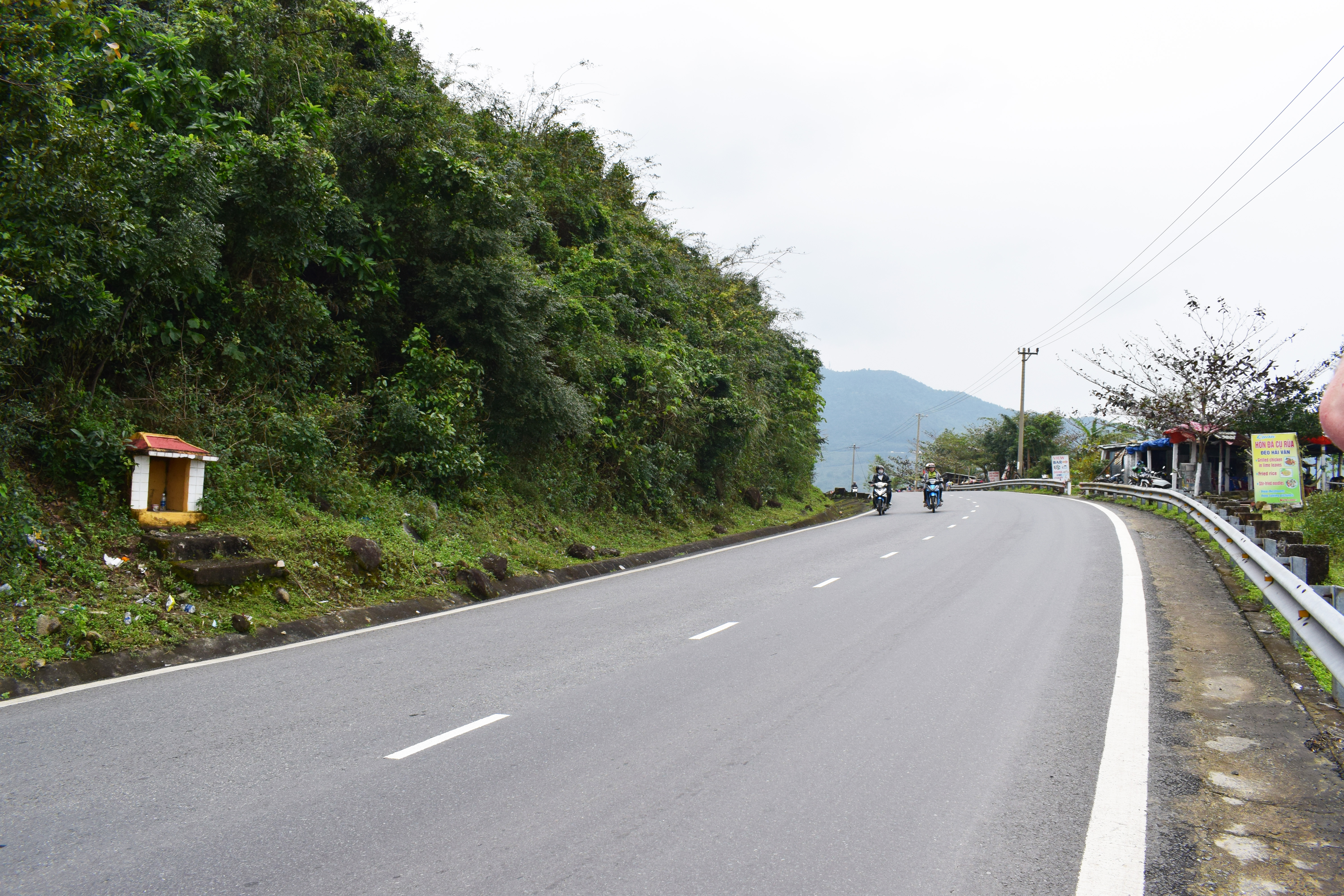
Hải Vân Pass.

On 3 June 2020, Triệu Quân Sự escaped again from Detention Camp T10, he climbed over the prison fences, grabbed onto a water pipe and ran into the forest. When passing through a resident's house, Sự stole clothes, a mobile phone, a motorbike and other accessories. On 4 June, Sự arrived in Tam Kỳ city, sold the stolen phone for 700.000 VND ($26.69), and continued toward northern Vietnam. The next afternoon, traffic police stopped Sự while he was riding his motorbike to Hải Vân Pass. He abandoned his vehicle and escaped into the mountains, eventually making his way to the sea and then to Đà Nẵng, before hiding in Hội An. Sự was arrested on 18 June at a cyber game café in Tam Kỳ, where he had been living for 5 days. After being arrested, Sự confessed to committing six thefts, including a motorbike, three cell phones, and 6 million VND ($228.58) during his escape.

On 18 December 2020, the Military Court of Military Region 5 opened a trial for Triệu Quân Sự, who was accused of prison breaking and theft of property. The court found him guilty and increased Sự sentence by six years in prison. Sự was later transferred to T-974 Prison Camp, under the control of Department of Criminal Investigation, Ministry of National Defence in Thành Long Commune, Thạch Thành District, Thanh Hóa Province.

=== 2022 ===
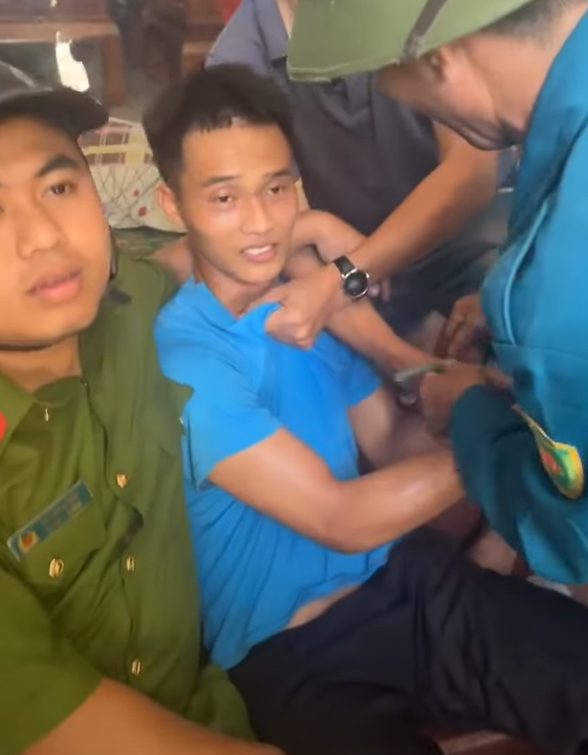
Triệu Quân Sự being detained by police and the residents.

At around 19:00–19:30 (UTC+07:00), 31 May 2022, Triệu Quân Sự escaped for the fourth time. The Criminal Police Department immediately sent local militia, police forces, and many detectives to catch Sự. On the afternoon of 1 June, at around 14:00 PM (UTC+07:00), following a report from residents, the police force from Thanh Hóa province captured Sự on Vừng Street Market, near National Route 1A, while he was eating in front of a resident's house. They spotted him while searching in a residential area approximately 30 km from the prison, where he had stolen 2 bicycles and was trying to hide after escaping. At his arrest and transfer to the Hà Trung District police, Sự was reportedly calm and smiled while answering questions, showing no resistance.

After the arrest of Triệu Quân Sự, Minister of Public Security Tô Lâm wrote a letter of commendation to Thanh Hóa Provincial Police for their role and recommended rewards for those involved. On 25 November 2022, Military Region 4 Court sentenced him to an additional six years for escaping from prison and theft.

== Gaming addiction ==
Triệu Quân Sự is often highlighted in Vietnamese media as prime example of a gaming addict. The Lao Động newspaper described him as a "carefree, thoughtless, and heartless child," highlighting the negative effects that gaming addiction can have on youth, including potentially leading them to commit crimes. The newspaper of Ho Chi Minh City Police, controlled by the Ministry of Public Security, mentioned that his escapes from prison often involved internet cafes, indicating that his gaming habits played a role in his criminal behavior. Đoàn Văn Báu, an expert in criminal psychology, pointed out that Sự treated his escapes like a game, motivated by a desire for excitement, attention, and freedom. He also criticized the media and online users for romanticizing Sự's actions, saying that they were praising him like a character from the television show Prison Break.
