= Yoshie Shiratori =

Japanese prison escapee

- 白鳥 由栄
- Shiratori in 1948
- Born: July 31, 1907; Aomori, Aomori Prefecture, Empire of Japan
- Died: February 24, 1979 (aged 71); Aomori Prefecture, Japan
- Known for: Escaping from four Japanese prisons

Yoshie Shiratori (Japanese: 白鳥 由栄, Hepburn: Shiratori Yoshie; IPA: [ɕiɾa̠to̞ɾʲi jo̞ɕie̞]; July 31, 1907 – February 24, 1979) was a Japanese prison escapee born in Aomori Prefecture. Shiratori was known for escaping prison four times. There is a memorial to Shiratori at the Abashiri Prison Museum.

There are numerous tales describing his escapes, but some details may be highly exaggerated rather than factual.

== Early life ==
Yoshie Shiratori was born on July 31, 1907, in Aomori, Japan. His father died when he was two years old, and he was abandoned at a young age by his mother, who took only his older brother to live with a farmer in Akita Prefecture, leaving only Shiratori and his sister behind. Initially, he worked in a tofu shop run by his Aunt, before becoming a fisherman to catch crabs in Russia. After switching jobs several times and finding little success, he turned to gambling and robbery for a living.

== Prison escapes ==
=== Aomori prison break ===
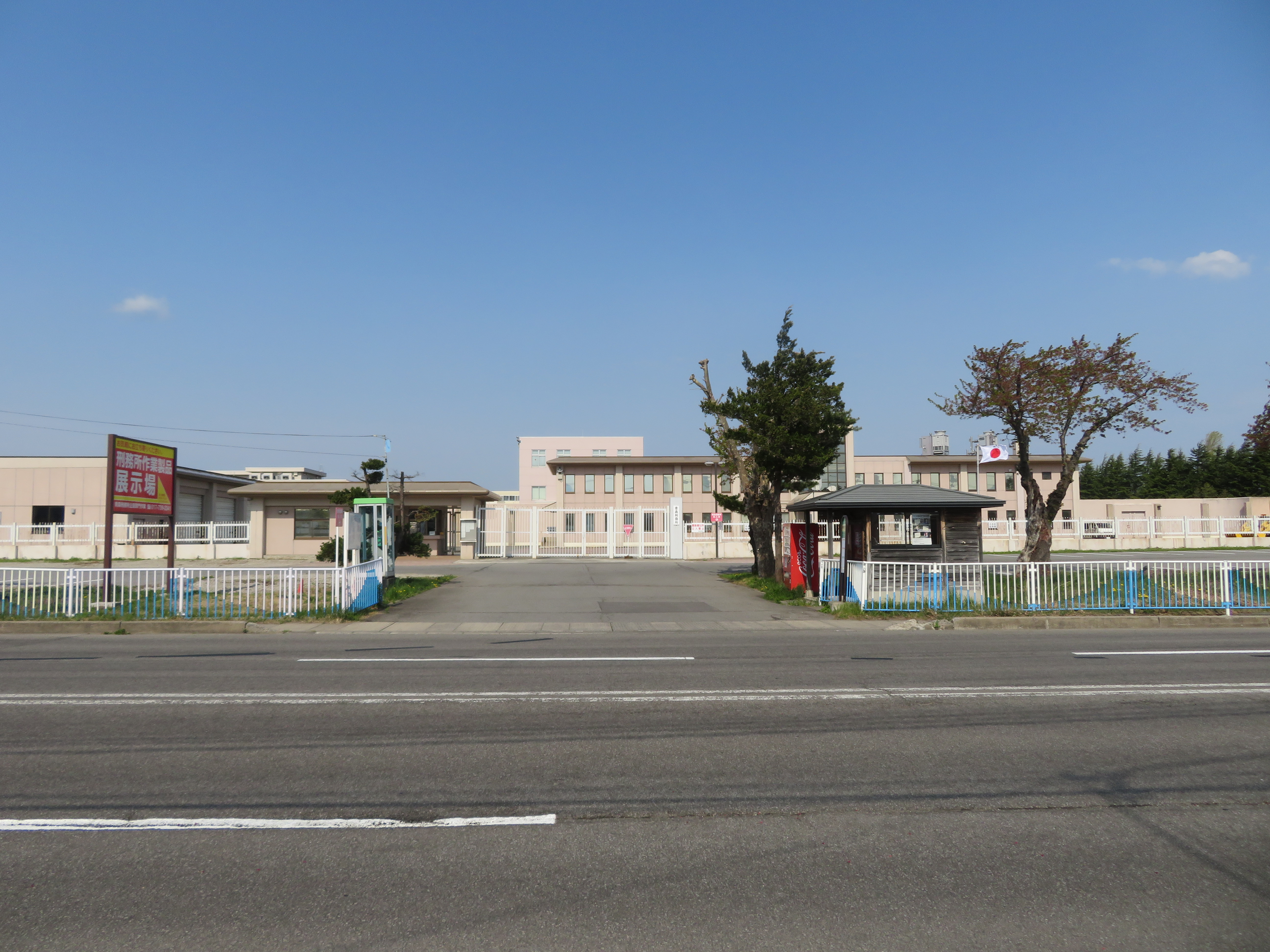
Aomori Prison

Shiratori was imprisoned at Aomori prison in 1936 for a felony murder charge, and after studying the guards' routine for months, he escaped by picking his cell lock with the metal wire that was wrapped around the washroom's bucket provided for bathing and escaped through a cracked skylight. Before escaping, he placed floorboards onto his futon to fool the passing guards into thinking he was still asleep.

=== Akita prison break ===
Police recaptured Shiratori after three days while he was stealing supplies from a hospital. Sentenced to life in prison for escaping and attempted theft, he was transferred to Akita prison in 1941.

At Akita prison, Shiratori was placed in a cell specially designed for escape artists, featuring high ceilings, one small skylight, and smooth copper walls. He was also constantly handcuffed. Shiratori was able to dislocate his thumbs, allowing him to secretly slip out of the handcuffs at night. Shiratori was able to scale the walls, and he noticed that the wooden framing around the window bars was beginning to rot. Every night, he would climb up to loosen the vent until he finally managed to pry away the wood and open the skylight. Shiratori waited until a stormy night to climb the walls to make sure his footsteps wouldn't be heard and made his escape on June 14, 1942. Three months later, he showed up at the house of head guard Kobayashi to ask for help, as he was one of the only people who had shown kindness and respect to Shiratori during his stay in the Akita prison. According to non-fiction writer Michinori Saito, who interviewed Shiratori directly, ‘Kobayashi treated Shiratori kindly by offering him potatoes and tea, then accompanied him to the police station and persuaded him to turn himself in.’

=== Abashiri prison break ===
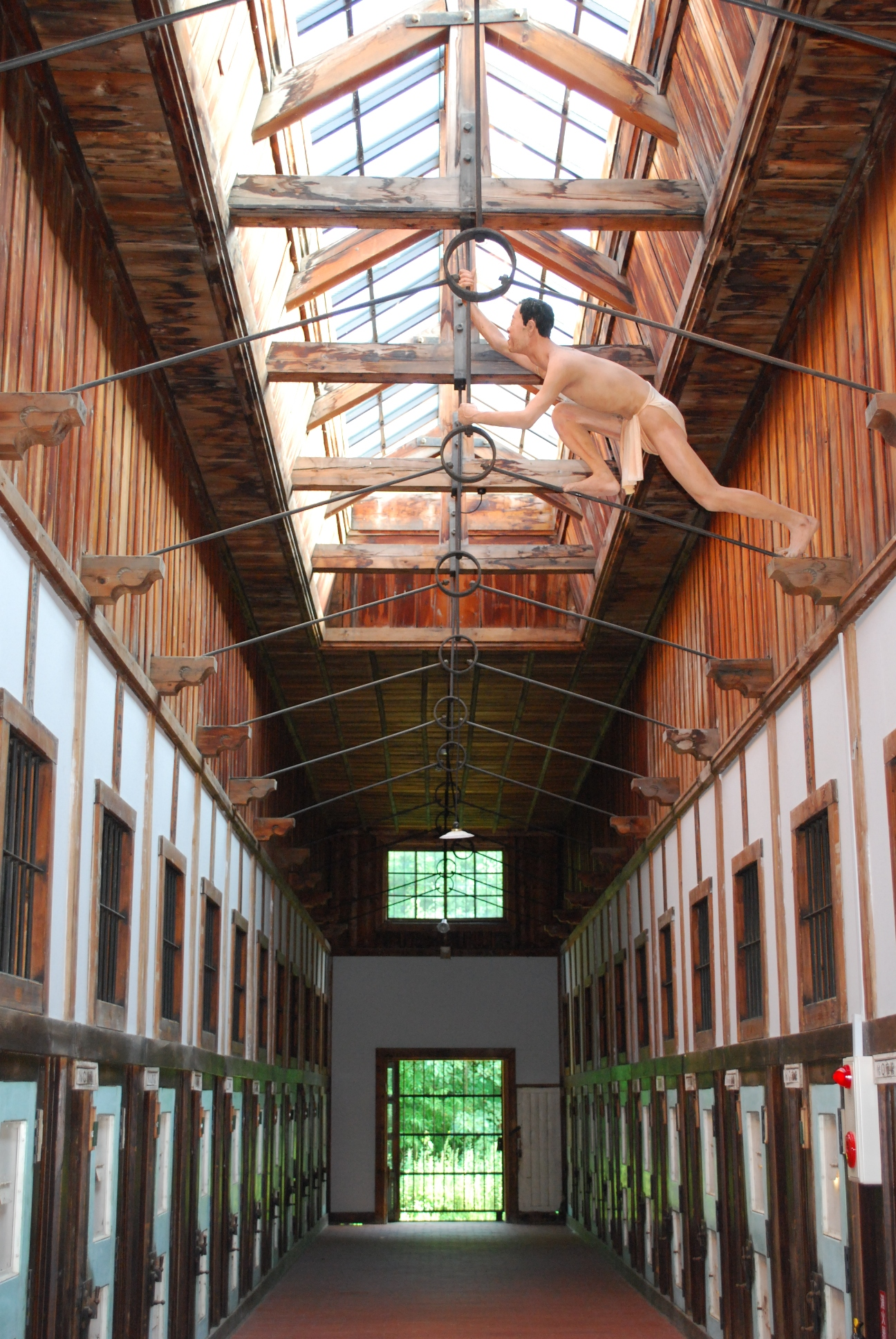
Replica of Shiratori's escape from Abashiri Prison at the Abashiri Prison Museum.

During the winter of 1942/43, Shiratori was transferred to Abashiri prison in Northern Hokkaido, the country’s northernmost prison. He was thrown into an open cell exposed to the extreme cold, and the guards would beat him up whenever he attempted to stand up. Furthermore, he and other inmates at Abashiri prison were forced to wear thick clothing in summer and thin clothing in winter. Afterwards, Shiratori was fitted with specially made handcuffs, which took enormous effort to remove. They were only removed for bathing and meals. Because they were rarely taken off, Maggots bred in the handcuffs, causing his skin to develop infections. The treatment that Shiratori endured eventually led to his decision to escape.

When the guards delivered meals, he would drip miso soup on the handcuffs and food slot, both of which eventually became corroded due to the salt content of the miso soup, allowing Shiratori to break them. At this time, despite being kept in solitary confinement throughout his imprisonment, he obtained information about the prison and its surroundings from prisoners assigned to perform various duties within the prison. He also knew that Branko Vukelić (spy), who was a Soviet spy, had been imprisoned at Abashiri Prison. On August 26, 1944, he dislocated both of his shoulders, enabling him to slip through the narrow food slot in his cell door and escape the prison, using a wartime blackout as cover. After living in an abandoned mine deep in the mountains for two years, he descended to a nearby village and learned of the surrender of Japan. However, he was captured yet again after he fatally stabbed a farmer who had caught him stealing a tomato from his farm. The reason for the escape was revenge against unkind guards. At the time, guards who allowed an escape were subject to rules imposing penalties such as pay deductions. Conversely, on days when a kind guard was on duty, the escape was postponed by one day.

=== Sapporo prison break ===
For his previous escapes and the farmer's murder, Shiratori was sentenced to death by the Sapporo District Court despite claiming that he had stabbed the farmer in self-defence. At the Sapporo prison, he was placed in a specially designed cell with high ceilings and windows smaller than his head. However, due to the confidence that the guards had in the security of the cell, they no longer bothered to handcuff Shiratori, and also because they were hyper-focused on stopping another roof escape, they neglected to install enhanced security features on the floors. Shiratori cut out a section of the floorboards using a homemade saw fashioned from a piece of metal from the washbasin, then concealed it within a tube filled with excrement. This was because the guards avoided inspecting the soiled tubes due to their distaste for them, making the search perfunctory.

On March 31, 1947, after cutting through the floor with a handmade saw, Shiratori used his miso soup bowls to dig a two-meter tunnel through the earth in just two hours, eventually using the accumulated snow as a foothold to scale the outer wall and successfully flee into the night. Prisons in Japan at that time were wooden structures, featuring a gap of approximately 60 centimeters between the floorboards and the earth beneath, designed to prevent rot from damp and for hygiene purposes. The excavated earth could thus be concealed within this gap.

== Final years ==
After a year of freedom, it is said that Shiratori was offered a cigarette by a police officer in a park. Emotionally touched by the kindness, Shiratori admitted he was an escaped convict and offered to be turned in. He was arrested and tried once again, but the High Court of Sapporo, having reviewed his case, decided that the farmer's death was accidental and merely a result of acting in self-defense. As a result, the court revoked his death sentence, instead sentencing him to 20 years for his escapes, having noted that Shiratori never harmed a single guard during his breakouts. During the trial, Shiratori explained his motive to escape prison, which was the fact that he could not stand the guards' abusive actions towards inmates. After the court officials accepted his testimony, Shiratori's request to be imprisoned in Tokyo was also granted, and he spent 14 years in Fuchu Prison, where the guards treated him nicely for the first time, until December, 1961, when he was finally released on parole.

Shiratori divorced his wife whilst serving a prison sentence at Aomori Prison. After his release on parole, he visited his family just once and saw his eldest daughter, but was unable to speak to her. His wife had died while he was in prison. Shiratori lived for another decade, working odd jobs to survive. He died after suffering a heart attack in 1979, at the age of 71.

== In media ==
According to Asian cinema author Earl Jackson, Sadao Nakajima's 1974 film The Rapacious Jailbreaker is most likely based on Shiratori.

Akira Yoshimura's 1983 novel Hagoku is based on Shiratori's life.

The character Yoshitake Shiraishi in Satoru Noda's 2017 manga series Golden Kamuy was based on Shiratori.
