= Casey White prison escape =

2022 prisoner escape aided by a corrections officer

Casey White jail escape
- Date: April 29 – May 9, 2022
- Location: Lauderdale County Jail, Florence, Alabama, U.S.
- Type: Jail escape, manhunt, suicide by gunshot
- Motive: Romantic/Intimate relationship
- Participants: Casey White and Vicky White
- Outcome: Casey White and Vicky White caught in Evansville, Indiana, U.S.; Vicky White dead by suicide after shooting herself in the head; Casey White taken into custody
- Deaths: 1 (Vicky White)
- Injuries: 1 (Casey White)
- Charges: Casey White: First-degree prison escape; Felony murder (dropped); Vicky White (charges dropped after death): Second-degree forgery; Identity theft; Facilitating a prisoner escape
- Verdict: Pleaded guilty
- Convictions: First-degree prison escape
- Sentence: Life imprisonment with the possibility of parole

The jail escape of Casey White took place on April 29, 2022, when White, who was awaiting trial in a capital murder case, escaped the Lauderdale County Jail in Florence, Alabama, United States. Corrections officer Vicky White (no relation) engineered and facilitated the escape by taking Casey in a car to what she claimed to her coworkers was a scheduled mental health evaluation at the courthouse. The manhunt for the pair was widely covered by American media.

Law enforcement caught up with Casey and Vicky White on May 9 in Evansville, Indiana, with the manhunt ending in Casey White crashing the car he was driving. Vicky White shot herself in the head, while Casey White was apprehended and returned to Alabama. Vicky later died from her injuries. Casey was charged with her murder under Alabama's felony murder rule, but the charge was dropped when Casey pleaded guilty to prison escape on May 5, 2023.

== Escape ==
On the morning of April 29, 2022 at 9:30 a.m., Vicky White, the assistant director at the Lauderdale County Jail in Florence, Alabama, escorted Casey White to a police vehicle, then left the detention center. A surveillance video showed Casey in handcuffs and leg shackles. Casey, who has an extensive criminal history, was already serving 75 years for a 2015 crime spree. He was at the facility for pre-trial motions after having confessed two years earlier to the 2015 stabbing death of 59-year-old Connie Ridgeway.

Vicky told fellow officers she was taking Casey to the county courthouse in Florence for a psychological evaluation, then going to see her personal physician since she was not feeling well that day. The task aroused suspicion since inmates being taken to the courthouse are supposed to be escorted by two deputies. Authorities believe she was not challenged because of her position.

The two never returned to the detention center. The Lauderdale County Sheriff's Department was given a surveillance video, taken at a local gas station, of Vicky White's patrol car eight minutes after the pair left the detention center. The deputies checked the courthouse's itinerary, and found that there were no hearings or evaluations that day. Authorities feared Vicky may have been forced or coerced into helping Casey escape. They immediately initiated a statewide manhunt hoping to find her unharmed, and to recapture Casey.

== Investigation ==
Alabama authorities launched an investigation into the circumstances surrounding Casey White's escape. Vicky White was set to retire the day she left with Casey, but never finalized the paperwork. Prior to helping Casey escape, she sold her four-acre property for $95,550, significantly less than the property's assessed value of $235,600. She had also bought several items including firearms, men's clothing, and vehicles.

Officers soon discovered that Vicky had been giving Casey special treatment, including extra food and privileges. Guards also noted that Casey had a propensity for trying to elicit sympathy from the staff. Vicky's special treatment of Casey eventually led to a romantic relationship that may have begun in 2020. After this discovery, authorities terminated her employment and issued arrest warrants for her on May 2 and May 6, 2022, respectively, for helping Casey escape.

== Manhunt ==
The manhunt was switched from statewide to nationwide. The Ford Edge used as the second getaway vehicle was found abandoned in Tennessee. The couple had switched to a blue 2006 Ford F-150 Pickup Truck heading north, checking in and out of several motels along the way. Vicky White was seen in surveillance videos with her dark-colored hair, which differed from how she normally wore her blond hair. Later, a dark-colored, long-haired wig was found along with the possessions found in the truck Casey crashed.

The couple eventually arrived in Evansville, Indiana, where they rented a motel room. They reserved the room by paying a homeless man $100 to reserve the room for them. The man was unaware that the couple was on the run. They had paid for a 14-day stay at the motel room.

Authorities offered rewards for information leading to their capture, and considered them armed and dangerous. Law enforcement personnel were advised to approach White with caution due to his history of violence.

== Capture ==
On May 9, 2022, authorities in Evansville, Indiana, received a surveillance video of the couple washing the pickup truck from a car wash employee. They were later spotted in another video getting into a gray Cadillac DTS. An Evansville police officer saw the vehicle at a Motel 41, and called for additional units. The couple left the motel and entered the car with Casey White driving.

A chase ensued on US 41, and Casey drove onto a grassy field. A police vehicle rammed the Cadillac, causing it to flip into a ditch.

As law enforcement converged on the vehicle, Casey White surrendered to authorities without incident, but Vicky was suffering from a gunshot wound to the head. Casey told officers, "Please help my wife. She shot herself in the head and I didn't do it." Authorities said there was no indication Casey and Vicky were married. Vicky was rushed to a local hospital, and pronounced dead hours later. Her death was ruled a suicide. Her interment took place at Center Hill Cemetery in Lexington, Alabama, on May 14.

The State of Alabama eventually gave a person who chose to remain anonymous a $5,000 reward for information leading up to the capture.

== Alleged perpetrators ==
=== Casey White ===
Casey Cole White (born August 20, 1983) was serving a 75-year sentence at the time of the escape. In 2012, he was sentenced to three years in prison for beating his brother in the face and head with the handle of an axe-sledgehammer. In March 2016, he was sentenced to 75 years in prison for seven counts that included attempted murder and robbery.

In 2020, while at the William E. Donaldson Correctional Facility, he allegedly confessed to an investigator to the 2015 stabbing death of Connie Ridgeway, a 59-year-old resident of Rogersville, Alabama, and was charged with two counts of capital murder. He was therefore transferred to a detention center in Lauderdale County to face trial for the murder of Ridgeway. After being transferred, White recanted his confession and pleaded not guilty by reason of insanity.

White is 6 feet 9 inches (2.06 m) and heavily tattooed, with some being white supremacist symbols. He was 38 years old at the time of the escape.

=== Vicky White ===
Vicky Sue Davis White (August 19, 1965 – May 9, 2022) was working as an assistant director of corrections at the detention center in which Casey White was being held. She was set to retire on April 29, 2022, after 17 years as a corrections officer. She won the "Employee of the Year" award four times during her 17-year tenure, and was set to win the award for a fifth time for her last year of service. The conferring of the fifth award was rejected due to her role in helping Casey White escape and her subsequent death.

She married Tommy White in 2002 before divorcing him in 2006 due to his alcohol and drug abuse. She remained friends with her ex-husband until he died in January 2022, and remained close to both her mother and her ex-mother-in-law until the escape. She had no children. She was 56 years old at the time of her death.

== Post capture ==
After the Vanderburgh County coroner ruled Vicky White's death to have been the result of a suicide, her body was returned to Alabama. About 200 people attended her funeral.

Casey was returned to Alabama the next day after waiving his right to an extradition hearing. He was transferred back to the state prison in Bessemer, Alabama, rather than the facility from which he escaped. His motion for a preliminary hearing on the escape charge was denied on June 13, with the judge referring the case to grand jury. On July 11, Casey White was charged with felony murder for the death of Vicky White. In May 2023, Casey White reached a plea deal in which he pleaded guilty to first-degree prison escape, and in exchange would not be tried for felony-murder in the death of Vicky White.

In the weeks following their capture, the specific motel room in which Vicky White and Casey White stayed became highly sought after, with a waiting list for the room reaching 60 bookings.

== Adaptations ==
In 2022, Tubi released a movie about the prison escape called Prisoner of Love, starring Nicholle Tom as Vicky White and Adam Mayfield as Casey White.

In 2023, Lifetime released a movie about this prison escape called Bad Romance: The Vicky White Story as part of its "Ripped from the Headlines" feature films. It stars Wendi McLendon-Covey as Vicky White and Rossif Sutherland as Casey White. McLendon-Covey also serves as an executive producer.

On September 25, 2024, Netflix released a documentary about the prison escape titled Jailbreak: Love on the Run. Aaron Ginsburg, William Green, and Alex MacRae serve as producers.

== See also ==
- Felony murder rule
- Jurisdiction
- List of prison escapes
- Media circus
