= Live at Chelmsford Top Security Prison =

Live album by Sex Pistols
- Released: 1990
- Recorded: September 17, 1976

Live at Chelmsford Top Security Prison is a live album by Sex Pistols, released in 1990. It was recorded on 17 September 1976 at the Chelmsford Prison, before Glen Matlock left the band.

The recording featured many non-Sex Pistols overdubs and insertions arranged by the band's early soundman Dave Goodman. These included a canned audio track of a riot (complete with shouting, scuffles, breaking glass, etc.). As the liner notes on the CD say:

Their opening number was "Anarchy"... at the end of the number there was a barrage of catcalls, boos and screaming.

However, the same concert tracks were released (in original play order) on the Sex Pistols: Alive CD without overdubs, contrasting with the Goodman-produced Chelmsford CD.

== Track listing ==
1. Satellite
2. Submission
3. Liar
4. No Fun
5. Pretty Vacant
6. Problems
7. I Wanna Be Me
8. Seventeen
9. New York
10. No Lip
11. Stepping Stone
12. Substitute
13. Anarchy in the Prison
14. Did You No Wrong
