= HM Prison Chelmsford =

Prison in Essex, England

Coordinates: 51.7359°N 0.4865°E

HMP Chelmsford
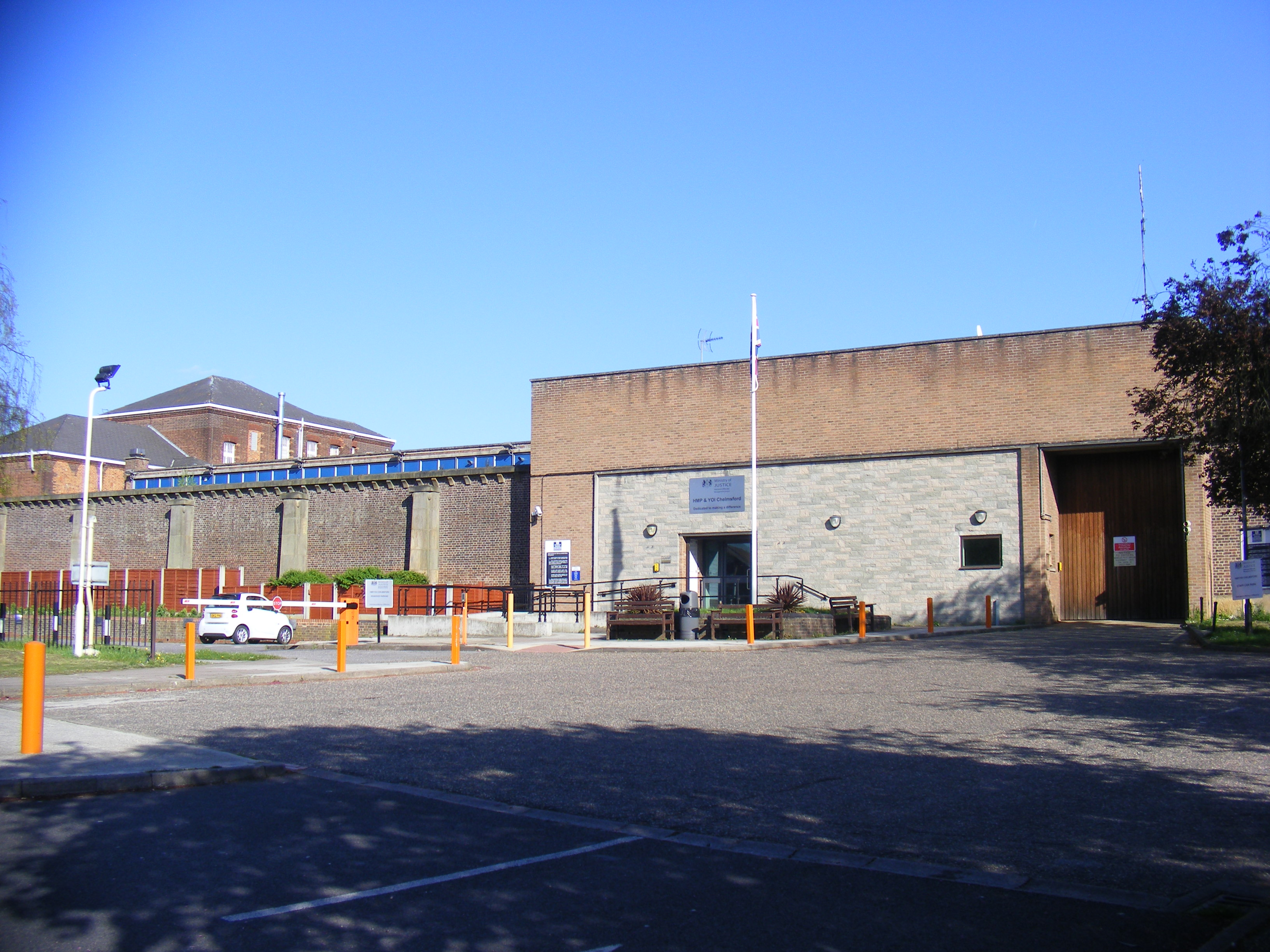
- Interactive map of HMP Chelmsford
- Location: Chelmsford, Essex
- Security class: Category B - Adult Male/Young Offenders Institution
- Population: 695 (December 2016)
- Opened: 1825
- Managed by: HM Prison Service
- Governor: Mark Howard
- Website: Chelmsford at justice.gov.uk

HM Prison Chelmsford is a Category B men's prison and Young Offenders Institution, located in Chelmsford, Essex, England. The prison is operated by His Majesty's Prison Service.

== History ==
=== 19th century ===
Chelmsford Prison began as a county jail in 1825 before becoming into a Category B prison, a young person's prison, and a local prison. It was expanded in 1996.

The prison's main entrance was originally through an austere stone-built porter's lodge in the middle of the Springfield Road frontage. The lodge's flat roof was designed to support the gallows scaffold and drop, while the forecourt could easily accommodate the hundreds, and sometimes thousands, of spectators that would congregate for an execution. Originally called Springfield Prison, 43 people were hanged between 1825 and 1914. The first 'private' execution at Springfield was that of Michael Campbell on 24 April 1871. The 28 year old Berwick born tailor and former soldier was convicted of murder of Samuel Galloway (49), a retired dock worker in Stratford.

=== 20th century ===
The oldest man to be hanged in the 20th century in Britain was 71 year old German born grocer Charles Fremd who was executed on 4 November 1914 for murdering his wife at Leytonstone. She was found dead from a cut throat. Her husband was beside her with only a minor self-inflicted wound. As Fremd was dropped he caught and bruised his head on the trap door. Shortly after Fremd's death the prison was taken over by the army for use as a military gaol, and after it reverted to civilian use in 1931 there were no further executions Thus, the oldest man was also the last man to feel the noose around his neck at Springfield Prison.

=== 21st century ===
In 1999 the management at Chelmsford Prison were severely criticised by the Chief Inspector of Prisons, after findings that staff were failing to respond to cell alarms five years after a prisoner was beaten to death by his cell-mate. The prison was also criticised for unacceptably poor cleanliness. A further inspection a year later confirmed these failings at the prison. In 2002, "conditions at Chelmsford...[were] condemned as 'poor and cramped' by the gaol's board of visitors."

However, in 2005, Chelmsford was praised in its inspection for improving standards and procedures for inmates at the prison. This was confirmed a year later by the Independent Monitoring Board which praised the new management at the prison.

On 25 December 2007, 18-year-old Abdullah Hagar Idris hanged himself in the prison after he was told that he was going to be deported.

In January 2013, the Ministry of Justice announced that older parts of Chelmsford prison would close, with a reduction of 132 places at the gaol.

In December 2015, a riot lead to six members of staff needing hospital treatment.

In October 2025, Hadush Kebatu, a 41-year-old migrant sex offender, was mistakenly released from the prison while awaiting transfer to an immigration detention centre ahead of his planned deportation.

== The prison today ==
Chelmsford Prison accepts adult male prisoners and Young Offenders, convicted or on remand direct from courts within its local catchment area.

Education at the prison is contracted to Milton Keynes College, and courses offered include literacy, numeracy, information technology, art, barbering, journalism, cookery, ESOL as well as social and life programs. The prison's gym also offers physical education with industry-related qualifications, as well as recreational gym.

In addition, the prison has links to, and facilities provided by, organizations such as the Job Centre and the Samaritans. There is also a Prison Visitor Centre operated by the Ormiston Children and Families Trust.

Staffing at the prison was reduced by 25% by 2016. According to the Independent Monitoring Board bullying, violence and self-harm have increased markedly at the prison due to staff shortages. Budget cuts and the inability of the prison service to recruit and retain staff lead to fears for prison safety. The prison is becoming more dangerous and less effective. Prison health care provided by Care UK is considered poor, there were delays in getting medication and reliance on agency staff to fill vacancies.

There is insufficient secure mental health accommodation outside’ the prison for the most vulnerable inmates. The Independent Monitoring Board stated that the "level of service being provided to care for prisoners’ physical and mental health needs remains inadequate" Due to staff shortages the staff were unable to provide engagement work or education for prisoners. Illegal drugs are a problem. Use of force by staff is increasing and there is insufficient monitoring if this use is appropriate. Prisoners must spend too long in their cells. Physical and mental health services for prisoners were found to be inadequate.

The staff try to engage prisoners, however a report by the independent monitoring board for HMP/YOI Chelmsford for 2016-2017 found that it did not provide suitable engagement due to staff shortages.

Money is not available for needed renovation of the prisons as of 2016, particularly the Victorian sections of the prison.

Following the death of a vulnerable inmate in January 2017 and criticism by the Prison Ombudsman, Care UK announced it would end its healthcare contract there as the level of resource the prison service made available was insufficient.

Drug use is a serious problem at HMP Chelmsford according to HM Inspectorate of Prisons (42.6% of prisoners failed drug tests) and organised gangs supply prohibited items. Inspectors describe, "significant concerns about safety" and excessive levels of violence, much of the violence is due to supply and use of prohibited substances. Overcrowding and under-resourcing are blamed. Peter Clarke said the rising violence, suicides, accessibility of drugs and bad living conditions made him consider using the Urgent Notification protocol, which would make the Justice Secretary take action. In one month, prison authorities seized £15,000 worth of illegal goods. There were 17 suicides at Chelmsford during the 8 years to 2018 and 5 of them were since the inspection in 2016.

For examples of suicides, see Notable former inmates.

Deborah Coles of Inquest said the prison was, "incredibly unsafe [the rate of suicides] suggests that the plethora of recommendations following previous self-inflicted deaths have not been implemented. Inquests repeatedly identify the same systemic failings with dismal regularity. Recent inquests into deaths at Chelmsford prison have highlighted failures around the management of self-harm procedures, a lack of staff training in mental health awareness, inadequate risk assessments and failures in responding to bullying.

The failure to implement existing guidelines on the care of those at risk indicates a lack of care, neglect and inhuman treatment from punitive and often inflexible prison regimes.

— Deborah Coles, INQUEST

Coles urged the setting up of a national group to supervise how lessons from inquests and reports are carried out, the group to be accountable to Parliament.

Problems inspectors drew attention to included that 40% of prisoners who did not take part in activities were locked in their cells for up to 22 hours a day and items including mattresses and pillows were in short supply.

The prison was originally designed for 700 men in the 1830s but the Howard League for Penal Reform states it was designed for 531.

== Notable inmates ==
- In 1990 former professional footballer Tony Adams spent 57 days of a four month sentence in HMP Chelmsford for drink-driving.
- Stephen Bear, reality TV personality
- Alfred George Hinds
- Pat Terrence Tate, drug dealer linked to Essex murders
- Frankie Fraser, English gangster
- George Ince, linked to Kray twins

== In popular culture ==
- The 1979 film Porridge (a film version of the Porridge TV series) was filmed almost entirely on location at Chelmsford Prison in freezing conditions in January 1979. The prison was unoccupied at the time because it was being refurbished after a fire in the centre that started in the chapel.
- The punk rock band The Sex Pistols recorded a live album here called Live at Chelmsford Top Security Prison.
- Featured in TV Series Luther
