= Alfred George Hinds =

British criminal (1917–1991)

Alfred George Hinds (1917 – 5 January 1991) was a British criminal who, while serving a 12-year prison sentence for robbery, broke out of three high security prisons. Despite the dismissal of thirteen of his appeals to higher courts, he was eventually able to gain a pardon using his knowledge of the British legal system.

== Early life ==
Hinds grew up in a children's home following the death of his father, a thief who died while receiving ten lashes (from a cat o' 6) as a form of corporal punishment for armed robbery, before running away at the age of seven. Eventually arrested for petty theft, he would later escape a Borstal institution for teenage delinquents.

Although drafted into the British Army during the Second World War, Hinds deserted from the armed forces after the war was over and continued his criminal career before his eventual arrest for a jewellery robbery in 1953 (£90,000 of which was never recovered by authorities). Although pleading not guilty, he was convicted and sentenced to 12 years imprisonment.

== Life as a fugitive ==
However, Hinds later escaped from Nottingham Prison after sneaking through the locked doors and over a 20-foot prison wall for which he became known in the press as "Houdini" Hinds. He worked as a builder-decorator in Ireland and throughout Europe until his arrest by detectives of Scotland Yard in 1956 after 248 days as a fugitive.

After his arrest, Hinds brought a lawsuit against authorities charging the prison commissioners with illegal arrest and used the incident as a means to plan his next escape by having a padlock smuggled in to him while at the law courts. Two guards escorted him to the toilet, but when they removed his handcuffs Hinds bundled the men into the cubicle and snapped the padlock onto screw eyes that his accomplices had earlier fixed to the door. He escaped into the crowd on Fleet Street, but was captured at an airport five hours later.

Hinds would make his third escape from Chelmsford Prison less than a year later. He then returned to Ireland where he lived for two years as a used car dealer under the name William Herbert Bishop before his arrest after being stopped in an unregistered car.

While eluding Scotland Yard, Hinds continued to plead his innocence sending memorandums to British MPs and granting interviews and taped recordings to the press. He later sold his life story to the News of the World for a reported £40,000.

He would continue to appeal his arrest and, following a technicality in which prison escapes are not listed as misdemeanors within British law, his final appeal before the House of Lords in 1960 was denied after a three-hour argument by Hinds before his return to serve six years in Parkhurst Prison.

In 1964, Hinds won a £1,300 settlement in a libel suit against the arresting officer Herbert Sparks, a former chief superintendent of Scotland Yard's Flying Squad, after Sparks had written a series of articles in the London Sunday Pictorial criticizing Hinds's claims of innocence. After failing to prove to a London jury the accuracy of his statements regarding Hinds's original conviction, Sparks was ordered to pay Hinds damages.

== Celebrity status ==
In 1966, Hinds published a personal account of his escapes and his clashes with the English legal system, titled Contempt of Court. His notorious jail breaks from three high security prisons and his successful libel case earned Hinds celebrity status. He soon became a sought-after speaker criticizing the English legal system. When invited to take part in a debate before the Polytechnic (now University of Westminster) Students' Union by President Owen Spencer-Thomas in 1967, he was confronted by another attempt to deprive him of his liberty. During a drink in a nearby pub after the debate, he was kidnapped by six students for a rag week stunt and frogmarched along a couple of streets to a basement room in the college. Hinds yet again foiled his captors after securing a bunch of keys and turning the lock on them.

Hinds later became a member of Mensa, becoming secretary of the Channel Islands' Mensa Society. He also became a consultant for the UK's justice system, helping to close various loopholes and address other issues.

Hinds is mentioned in Joe Orton's diary in January 1967 because the film director Lewis Gilbert asked Orton to write a screenplay for a film based on Hinds' book Contempt of Court. Orton turned Gilbert down and the film was never made.

Hinds's official release from prison in 1964 was marked by a cartoon by Giles in the Sunday Express.
