= Frederick Mors =

Austrian-American serial killer (1889–1918)

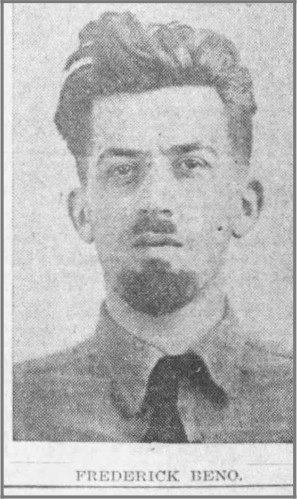
- Born: Carl Menarik; 2 October 1889; Vienna, Austria
- Died: c. 1918 (aged 28–29); Torrington, Connecticut, U.S.
- Other name: "Frederick Maurice Beno"
- Penalty: Involuntary commitment

Details
- Victims: 8
- Span of crimes: 1914–1915
- Country: United States
- State: New York
- Date apprehended: January 1915

Frederick Mors (born Carl Menarik, 2 October 1889 – 1918?) was an Austrian serial killer. Mors killed eight elderly patients by poison while employed in a nursing home in New York City. He was very cooperative, readily admitting to the murders when questioned by police. After being arrested, Mors was diagnosed as a megalomaniac and committed to an insane asylum. He later escaped.

== Immigration ==
Mors immigrated to New York City from his native Austria-Hungary in June 1914. The German-speaking Mors gained employment as a porter for the German Odd Fellows' Home in Unionport, New York (now the Bronx), through the Immigrant Free Employment Bureau. The home housed 250 orphans and 100 elderly men and women.

Inexplicably, though he terrified the older residents, both the younger residents and visitors seemed to like him and enjoy his company.

Mors exhibited signs of megalomania soon after beginning to work at the nursing home: he would wear a white lab coat with a stethoscope around his neck, and insisted that the elderly residents address him as "Herr Doktor".

== Murders ==
In the four-month period from September 1914 to January 1915, 17 residents—an unusually high number—died at the Home.

Fearing foul play, the administration called the police in to investigate.

Mors had used arsenic and chloroform to murder at least eight of the elderly residents. He later claimed he was "putting them out of their misery".

He committed his first murder using arsenic, purchased from a local druggist. Encountering some difficulties with this method, he later switched to the use of chloroform.

== Victims ==
- Carl Hitzel, 78, by administering morphine
- Henry Haensel, 67, by giving arsenic
- Carl Garf, 65, by giving arsenic
- Mrs. Katherine Piazza, 75, by giving chloroform
- Mrs. Frederick Drey, 75, by giving chloroform
- Mrs. Elizabeth Hauser, 70, by giving chloroform
- Henry Horn, 68, by giving chloroform
- Ferdinand Scholtz, 77, by giving chloroform

== Investigation ==
Early in the investigation, police learned of the fear the elderly patients and staff had of Mors. On these grounds, he soon became the primary suspect of the investigation. When questioned, Mors readily and calmly admitted to killing eight of the seventeen patients who had recently died. He claimed that these were mercy killings and that they had been nuisances. In detail, he described his method as:

First I would pour a drop or two of chloroform on a piece of absorbent cotton and hold it to the nostrils of the old person. Soon my man would swoon. Then I would close the orifices of the body with cotton, stuffing it in the ears, nostrils, and so on. Next I would pour a little chloroform down the throat and prevent the fumes escaping the same way.

Mors also claimed that the home's superintendent had encouraged him to kill the more ill and more elderly patients.

The district attorney declined to prosecute Mors, finding him to be criminally insane, and committed him to the Hudson River State Hospital, pending deportation to Austria. Mors escaped from the institution in May 1916.

In 1917 he surfaced in Torrington, Connecticut, living under the alias Frederick Maurice Beno and working in the first aid department of Turner & Seymour Company. He used the same birthday as Mors in a World War I draft registration. He also sent three letters saying he was the same person that had killed eight people in New York. He left notes of suicidal intent and disappeared in April 1918. A skeletonized corpse was discovered in May 1923 that was identified as his by officials who examined the remains at the time. The remains had been there for at least four years and were identified partially based on the type of shoes both Mors and Beno were known to have worn. Two bottles that were presumed to be poison were found nearby.

== See also ==
- List of serial killers in the United States
