= La Joyita Prison =

Prison in Pacora, Panama

Coordinates: 9.14304°N 79.24204°W

La Joyita Prison is a prison in Pacora, Panama. The facility is overcrowded and has been repeatedly accused of systematic abuses against its population.

Problems at the prison have been water being available only for part of the day. In September 2013, the government minister, Jorge Ricardo Fabrega, said 5,500 inmates from La Joya and La Joyita would be transferred, starting in January 2014, to the new La Joya Prison located in Pacora.

On December 17, 2019 a gunfight erupted inside La Joyita. 15 inmates were killed when a split in the street gang Bagdad occurred. Prisoners wielding assault rifles and handguns executed one another in the worst inter-prison violence in the nation's history. The La Joya, La Joyita, Nueva Joya complex continues to degrade into basic concentration camp status. Panama has yet to have implemented any lasting prison reforms.

On February 3, 2020, convicted prisoner Gilberto Ventura Ceballos escaped from La Joyita Prison. The government offered a US $50,000 reward for his recapture. He got recaptured on February 13, 2020.
