= Frank Freshwaters =

American criminal and former fugitive

- Born: April 18, 1936 (age 89)
- Other names: William Harold Cox; The Shawshank Fugitive
- Citizenship: United States
- Criminal charge: Voluntary manslaughter

Frank Freshwaters aka "Reon" (born April 18, 1936) is an American criminal and former fugitive. Born and raised in Akron, Ohio, Freshwaters was arrested in 1957 for the death of Eugene Flynt, whom he struck and killed while speeding. He pled guilty to voluntary manslaughter and, after a brief sentence at the infamous Ohio State Reformatory, he escaped from an honor farm in 1959. In the intervening years, Freshwaters lived under an assumed name and sought work as a truck driver. He was nearly apprehended in 1975 while living in West Virginia, but then-Governor Arch A. Moore Jr. refused to return him to Ohio officials because of his positive reputation.

== Biography ==
Freshwaters was born on April 18, 1936, in Akron, Ohio. On July 3, 1957, Freshwaters was speeding when he struck and killed Army veteran Eugene Flynt in Akron. He pled guilty to voluntary manslaughter and was sentenced to 1–20 years in prison. Soon, his sentence was suspended and he was given a five-year probation term. After violating the terms of the agreement, he was sentenced again to 20 years at the Ohio State Reformatory in Mansfield on February 19, 1959. Freshwaters gained the trust of officials at the facility with good behavior, and was transferred to Sandusky Honor Farm in Perkins Township to carry out his sentence. He escaped from the farm on September 30, 1959, though the details of his escape have never been disclosed.

In the intervening years, Freshwaters lived under an assumed name and sought work as a truck driver and a mobile librarian. He initially traveled to Florida, where he obtained a Social Security card under the alias William Harold Cox. He later returned north and settled in Hurricane, West Virginia, where he worked for Hennis Trucking and Chemical Leaman Tank Lines. In October 1975, he was arrested on an Ohio warrant in Charleston, West Virginia, after authorities determined his identity. The community largely respected and enjoyed the presence of Freshwaters, who at this point in his life played the guitar and held a strong affinity for country music. Governor Arch A. Moore Jr. refused to send him back to Ohio, and praised his "flawless, 16-year residency" in an official letter. Moore wrote that while he had committed a crime, Freshwaters was largely a good citizen. He was released and went into hiding again. He settled in the Melbourne, Florida, area under the name of William Harold Cox by 1986, living with one of his sons.

By the time of his arrest, Freshwaters was living in a ramshackle trailer home on the property of Florida Senator Thad Altman's parents. According to J.D. Gallop of Florida Today, "he was a caretaker on the expansive marshland property, keeping mostly to himself while occasionally fishing and warding off would-be trespassers."

=== Arrest and release ===
In early 2015, the Marshals Service set up a cold case unit in northern Ohio, reopening an active search for Freshwaters. They determined that he may be living in the Melbourne area and approached him on May 4, 2015. Authorities showed Freshwaters a photograph of himself from 1959 and asked if he had seen that man, to which he responded that he hadn't "seen him in a long time". He soon confessed and was arrested without incident. At the time of his arrest, he was the object of the longest capture in the history of the U.S. Marshals.

He was extradited back to Ohio, and served at the Ohio Department of Rehabilitation and Correction. According to Gallop, "more than 2,000 people from half a dozen states wrote in to the parole board to support him." On February 25, 2016, the Ohio Adult Parole Authority voted to release Freshwaters after his attorney argued he had caused no harm in his years evading officials. He was placed on parole with five years supervision. He was released June 15, 2016.
