= Thạch Thành district =

Coordinates: 20.167°N 105.667°E

Thạch Thành district Huyện Thạch Thành
- District
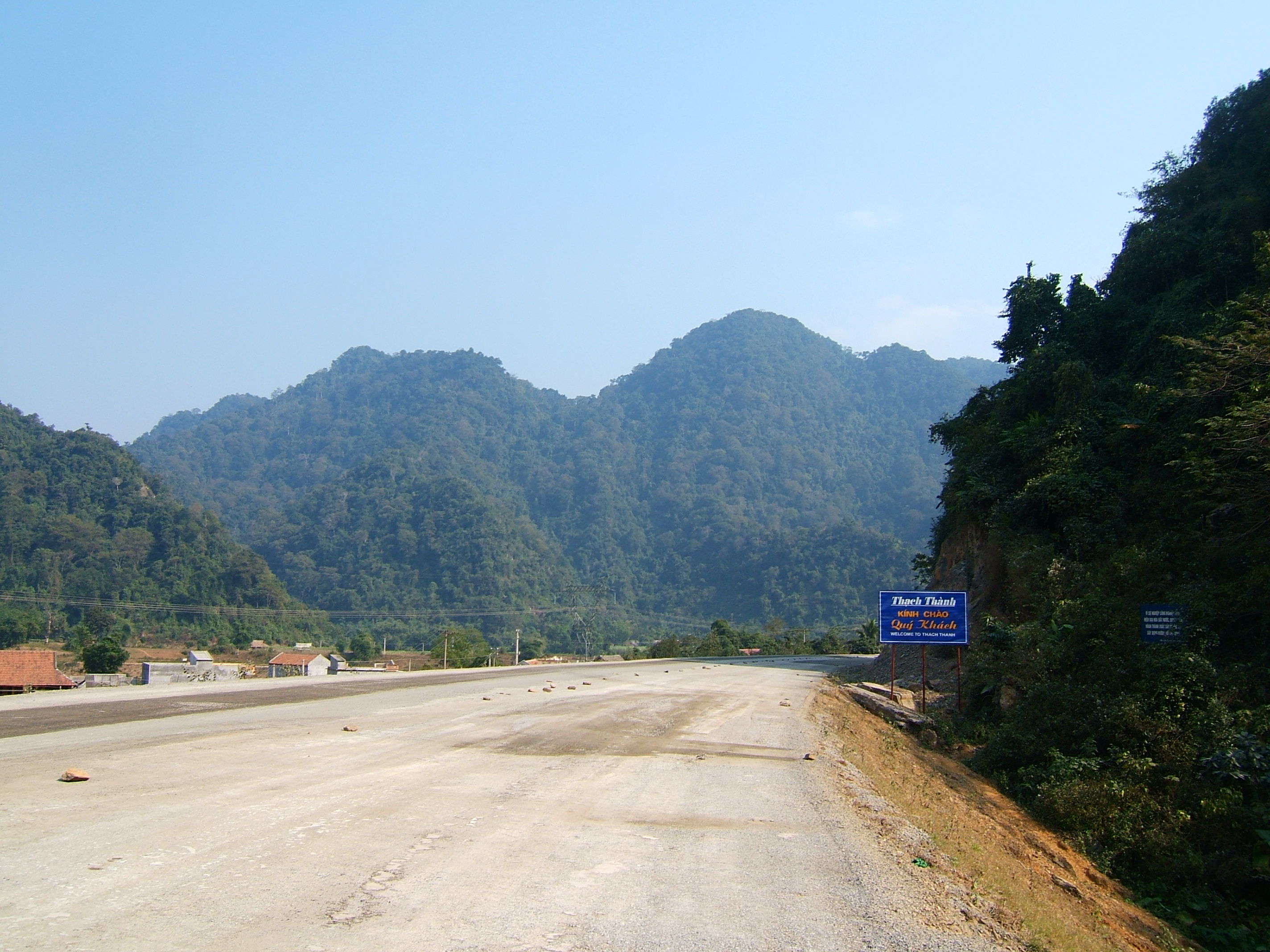
- Road sign in Thạch Thành
- Interactive map of Thạch Thành district
- Country: Vietnam
- Region: North Central Coast
- Province: Thanh Hóa
- Capital: Kim Tân

Area
  - Total: 219 sq mi (567 km^{2})

Population (2019)
  - Total: 143,080
- Time zone: UTC+7 (UTC + 7)

Thạch Thành is a district (huyện) of Thanh Hóa province in the North Central Coast region of Vietnam.

As of 2019 the district had a population of 143,080. The district covers an area of 567 km^{2} (219 sq mi). The district capital lies at Kim Tân.
