= Assault of Ayacucho prison =

Assault of Ayacucho prison (1982) Huamanga assault (1982)
- Part of the Internal conflict in Peru
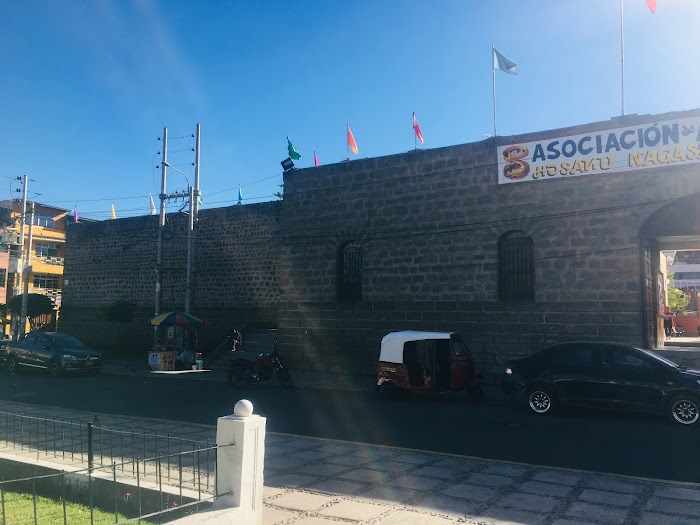
- Former Ayacucho prison that is currently an Feria Artesanal
| Date | March 2, 1982 |
| Location | Ayacucho, Huamanga Province |
| Result | Senderista victory; Escape of prisoners senderistas. |

Belligerents
| (Peru) Republican Guard | Shining Path |

Commanders and leaders
| (Peru) Carlos D. Matallana (Peru) Jorge Beraún Ramos (Peru) Victor de la Cruz | Elvira R. Aranda (executed); Edith Lagos Saez (executed); Fajardo Vera Ramos † |

Strength
| 300 soldiers 300 guards | 33 senderistas |

Casualties and losses
| 9 killed | 25 missing & wounded 5 executed |

On 2 March 1982, a group of 150 armed militants from the Shining Path (Sendero Luminoso) staged simultaneous assaults on two local police stations in Ayacucho, Peru, before attacking the prison, resulting in the release of 255 inmates. After a 5-hour battle, 16 people, including two prison guards, were dead and 12 people were wounded.

== See also ==
- Truth and Reconciliation Commission (Peru)
