= Mate crime =

Befriending a vulnerable person with the intent of exploiting them

Mate crime is a form of crime in which a perpetrator befriends a vulnerable person with the intention of then exploiting the person financially, physically or sexually. "Mate" (British slang for 'friend') crime perpetrators take advantage of the isolation and vulnerability of their victim to win their confidence.

In publicity regarding mate crime, Trafford Clinical Commissioning Group states:

Many vulnerable adults have few friends, and for some vulnerable people, having any friends is better than no friends at all. Mate crime centres around issues of self-belief and self-worth in the vulnerable person. Vulnerable people will often think it's all right for people to walk all over [them], because that's what's happened to them the whole of their lives.

Victims of mate crime may be enticed into committing criminal acts themselves and taking the blame so as to protect the real perpetrator, although the vulnerable person may lack the mental capacity themselves to be treated as a criminal.

In 2011, a serious case review following the death of Gemma Hayter found "clear evidence that Hayter was susceptible to abuse, as it was known she had suffered 'mate crime' regularly over some time" and noted that "an overall lack of thoroughness and information-sharing led to 'a number of missed opportunities' to find out what was happening more generally in her life and the company she was keeping".

In the United Kingdom, the Crown Prosecution Service (CPS) advises its staff to avoid using the term "mate crime":

People with learning disabilities or mental health issues are often 'befriended' by people who then exploit them. The term 'mate crime' is used by some disability organisations within the disabled community to raise awareness of the issue. It is not CPS policy to use this phrase as it may introduces further confusion regarding terminology and is potentially confusing to people with learning disabilities.

The National Autistic Society has claimed that "many people with autism desperately want to have friends, but may struggle to know the best ways of starting and maintaining friendships" and are therefore at risk of mate crime abuse.

Research has highlighted common factors in mate crime and hate crime.

== See also ==
- Cuckooing—a practice where criminals befriend a vulnerable person, and then exploit their home to commit crime such as drug dealing
- Murder of Gemma Hayter
- Murder of Jennifer Daugherty
- Murder of Shakira Spencer
