= State Correctional Institution – Greene =

Maximum security prison in Greene County, Pennsylvania, U.S.

Coordinates: 39.9060°N 80.1371°W

- Interactive map of State Correctional Institution – Greene
- Location: Franklin Township, Greene County, Pennsylvania
- Status: Open
- Security class: Supermax
- Capacity: 1,853
- Population: 1,569 (85.7%) (October 31, 2023)
- Opened: November 9, 1993
- Managed by: Pennsylvania Department of Corrections
- Governor: Josh Shapiro
- Warden: Michael Zaken
- Website: SCI Greene

Notable prisoners
- Mumia Abu-Jamal, Jimmy Dennis, Jerry Sandusky

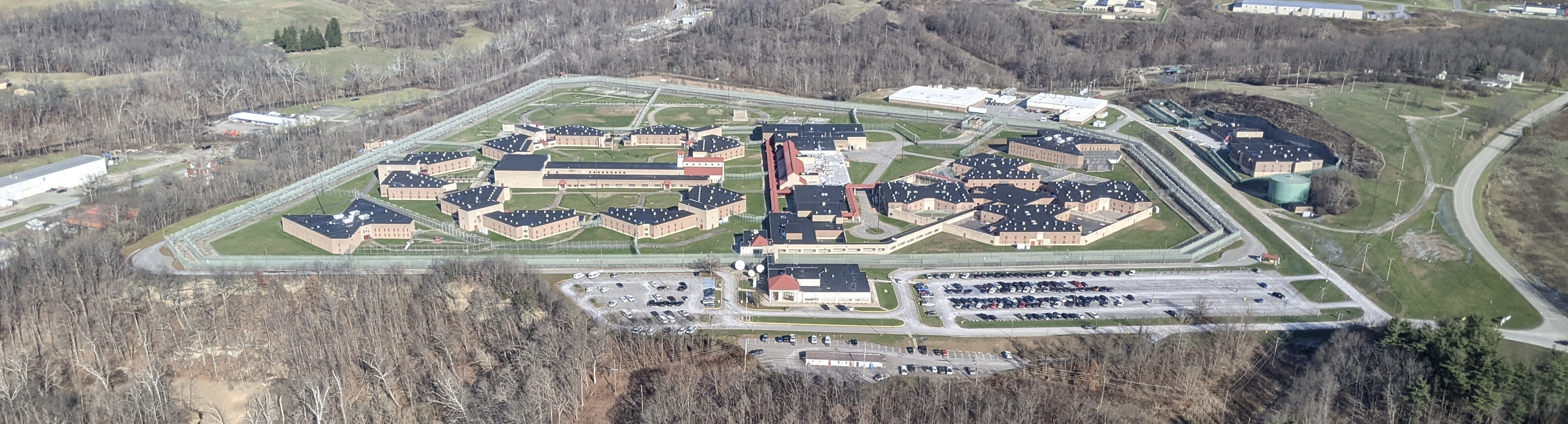
Aerial view of the prison in 2024

The State Correctional Institution – Greene (SCI Greene) is a maximum security prison for men, classified as a Supermax, located in Franklin Township, Greene County, Pennsylvania, near Waynesburg, off Interstate 79 and Pennsylvania Route 21. Pennsylvania Department of Corrections operates the prison, which previously housed most of Pennsylvania's capital case inmates.

It is in the far southwest of the state, near the border with West Virginia, in a rural area.

== History ==
SCI Greene opened in late 1993.

Around 1996, some prisoners stated that some guards used more force than necessary to control them, and a video camera had captured evidence related to the complaint. Charles Graner, a prison guard who began working at SCI Greene in 1996, was the defendant in two lawsuits, each by a different prisoner; both lawsuits were dismissed as one disappeared after finishing his sentence and the other had submitted his lawsuit after a deadline. Graner later became known for the Abu Ghraib scandal.

At some point all of the death penalty prisoners at Greene were moved to SCI Phoenix.

== Facility and operations ==
The prison had 11 cell blocks. As of 2012 SCI Greene had 1,750 prisoners and 720 employees. The death row prisoners are in blocks G and L; they normally stay in their cells but may go to a recreational area and the library. Greene was built with the newest features at the time, including central air conditioning.

The prison had cable television installed at the time of its opening.

== Demographics ==
As of 2012, SCI Greene had 157 death row prisoners, about 75% of the prisoners under Pennsylvania state death sentences.

== Notable inmates ==
Life imprisonment:

- Cosmo DiNardo, convicted of four murders in Bucks County in 2017.
- Ben Birdwell, one of the murderers of the Freeman family.
- Russell Maroon Shoatz, Black Panther convicted in the 1970 murder of Philadelphia police sergeant Francis Von Colln.
- Danilo Cavalcante Convicted of murder after killing his ex-girlfriend. Mostly known for his escape from Chester County Prison

Other imprisonment

- Jerry Sandusky
- Robert Loren Masters, Jr, one of the murderers of Jennifer Daugherty.

Death row:

- Christopher Roney (alias Cool C), hip hop artist, convicted in the murder of Philadelphia Police Department officer Lauretha Vaird in a bank robbery, since moved to Correctional Institution – Phoenix.
- Harvey Miguel Robinson, serial killer moved to State Correctional Institution – Phoenix in 2018.
- Richard Baumhammers, spree killer. Moved to State Correctional Institution - Somerset.
- Ricky Smyrnes, one of the murderers of Jennifer Daugherty, since moved to Correctional Institution – Phoenix.
- Raghunandan Yandamuri, murderer and kidnapper, since moved to Correctional Institution – Phoenix.

== Notable staff ==
- Charles Graner (began in 1996, later became an Abu Ghraib military prison guard)

== See also ==
- List of Pennsylvania state prisons
