= Malvern institute =

Drug and alcohol abuse treatment center in Malvern, Pennsylvania

The Malvern Institute for Psychiatric and Alcohol Studies, known as the Malvern Institute, is a drug and alcohol abuse treatment center in Malvern, Pennsylvania, with campuses throughout Pennsylvania. It was the first private facility of its kind in the United States.

The Malvern Institute focuses on rehabilitating alcoholics and drug abusers through evidence-based care and a 12-step philosophy.

== History ==
The Malvern Institute was founded in 1948. However, its roots date back to the early 1940s and the founding of the first Alcoholics Anonymous chapter in Philadelphia.

Dr. C. Dudley Saul and Dr. C. Nelson Davis were both early supporters of AA and traveled together to lecture on behalf of AA after becoming convinced of how a 12-step program could benefit recovering alcoholics. Dr. Saul established the 4021 Clubhouse, an AA meeting spot. In 1946, Dr. Saul and Dr. C. Nelson Davis opened the C. Dudley Saul Clinic in Philadelphia, where Dr. Davis served as Physician-in-Charge. This was the first private alcoholic treatment center in the United States.

In 1947, Dr. Saul died, and Dr. Davis moved the Saul Clinic from St. Luke's hospital in Philadelphia to Malvern and renamed it the Malvern Institute. St. Luke's continued on to become The Behaviorial Wellness Center at Girard.

Dr. Davis continued to lecture and write extensively about the diagnosis and treatment of alcoholism, including "Early Signs of Alcoholism" in the Journal of the American Medical Association, while serving as Psychiatrist-in-Chief of Malvern Institute. Dr. Davis also promoted the idea that alcoholism should be classified and treated as a disease. In 1987, the American Medical Association officially termed 'addiction' as a disease. What was once viewed as a moral failing is now known to be a primary brain disease.

In ensuing years, the Malvern Institute opened inpatient treatment centers and outpatient locations around Pennsylvania.

== See also ==
- Assistance in Recovery
