= Frenemies =

Frenemy is an oxymoron and a portmanteau of "friend" and "enemy" that refers to "a person with whom one is friendly, despite a fundamental dislike or rivalry" or "a person who combines the characteristics of a friend and an enemy".

Frenemies may also refer to:

- Frenemy, a 2009 American indie black comedy detective film directed by Gregory Dark
- Frenemies (film), a 2012 American-Canadian teen comedy-drama television film based on the novel of the same name directed by Daisy von Scherler Mayer
- "Frenemies" (Glee), an episode of the TV series Glee
- "Frenemies" (Sex and the City), an episode of the TV series Sex and the City
- "Frenemies", an episode from the 2016 reboot of The Powerpuff Girls
- Frenemies (podcast), a podcast featuring Ethan Klein and Trisha Paytas
- "Frenemies" (My Little Pony: Friendship Is Magic), an episode of My Little Pony: Friendship Is Magic
- "Frenemies", a song by Stand Atlantic from Was Here

== See also ==
- Frenemies: Loyalty Turned Lethal
