= Yandamuri =

Yandamuri is a name. People with the name include:

- Raghunandan Yandamuri
- Yandamuri Veerendranath
