= Malvern, Pennsylvania =

Borough in Pennsylvania, US

- Borough
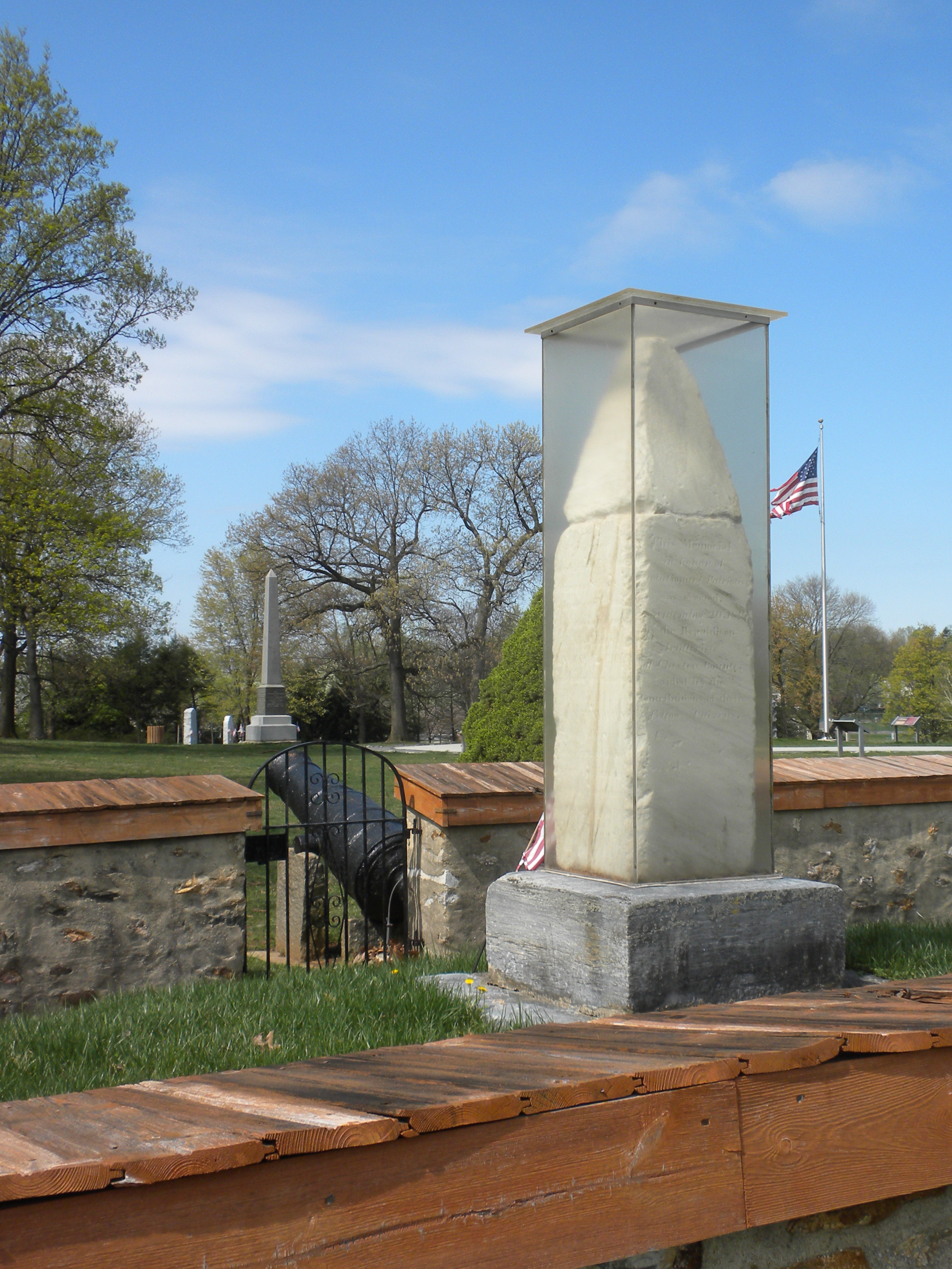
- Battle of Paoli monument site

- Logo

- Location of Malvern in Chester County, Pennsylvania (left) and of Chester County in Pennsylvania (right)

- Location in Pennsylvania Location in the United States
- Coordinates: 40°02′04″N 75°30′52″W
- Country: United States
- State: Pennsylvania
- County: Chester
- Incorporated: 1889

Government
  - Mayor: Pete Papadopoulos (D)

Area
  - Total: 1.27 sq mi (3.28 km^{2})
  - Land: 1.26 sq mi (3.26 km^{2})
  - Water: 0.0077 sq mi (0.02 km^{2})
- Elevation: 551 ft (168 m)

Population (2020)
  - Total: 3,419
  - Density: 2,712.6/sq mi (1,047.33/km^{2})
- Time zone: UTC-5 (EST)
  - Summer (DST): UTC-4 (EDT)
- ZIP Code: 19355
- Area codes: 610 and 484
- FIPS code: 42-46792
- Website: www.malvern.org

Malvern is a borough in Chester County, Pennsylvania, United States. It is 19.4 miles (31.2 km) west of Philadelphia. The population was 3,419 at the 2020 census.

== History ==
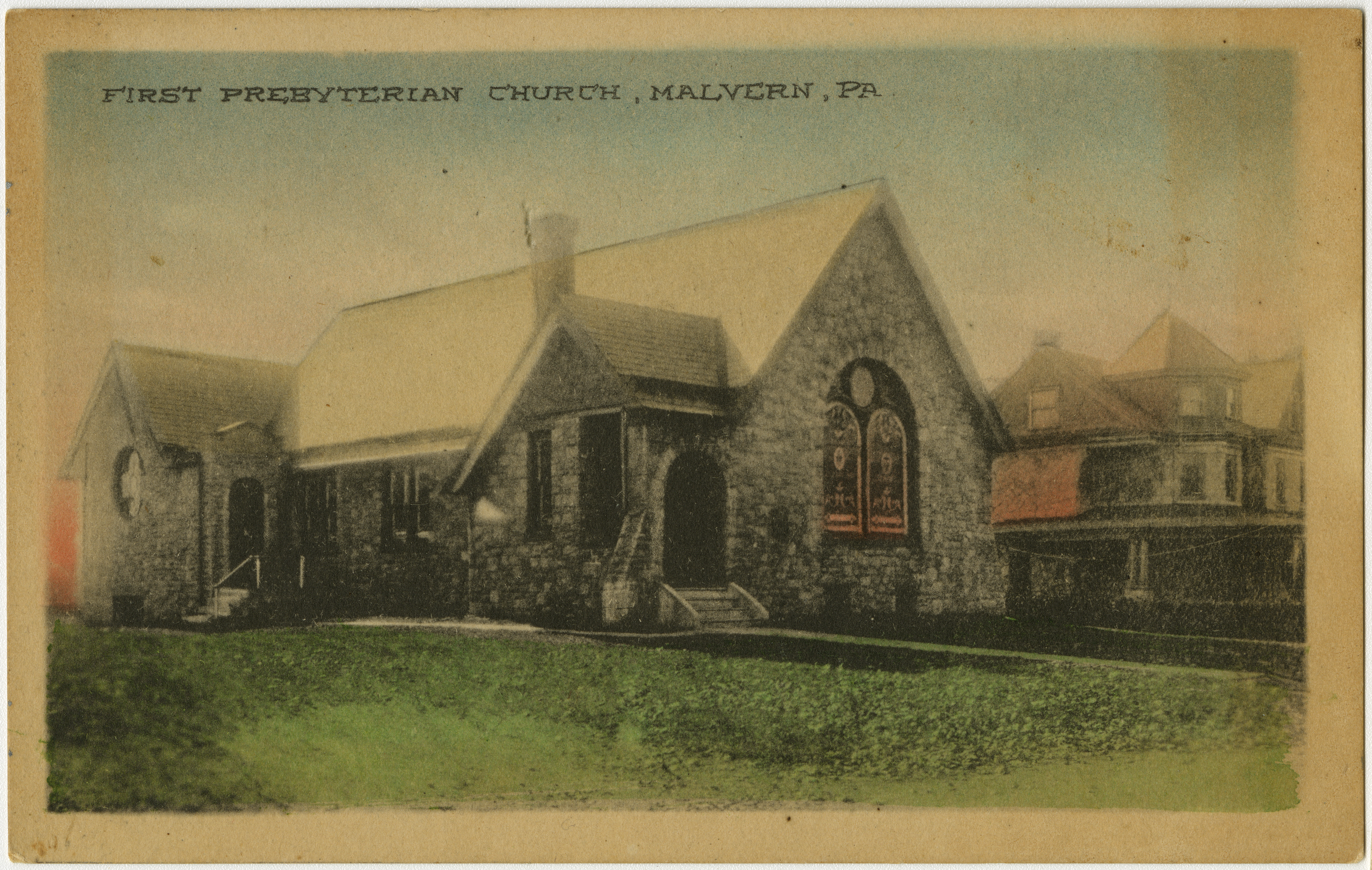
Malvern First Presbyterian Church before 1923

The area was originally settled in the 17th century by Welsh immigrants who purchased land from William Penn.

On the evening of September 20, 1777, in Malvern, General Charles Grey and nearly 5,000 British soldiers launched a surprise attack on a Patriot encampment, which became known as the Battle of Paoli. Having intercepted General Washington's orders to General Wayne regarding British rearguard actions, Grey directed his troops to assault the small regiment of Americans commanded by Anthony Wayne in an area near his residence. Not wanting to lose the element of surprise, Grey ordered his troops to remove the flint from their muskets and to use only bayonets or swords to launch a surprise sneak attack on the Americans under the cover of darkness.

With the help of a Loyalist spy who provided a secret password, "here we are and there they go" and led them to the camp, General "No-flint" Grey and the British overran several American pickets and launched their successful attack on the Continental Army camp. 201 American soldiers were killed or injured, while 71 were captured. The British suffered only 4 killed and 7 injured in comparison. Wayne's reputation was tarnished by the high casualties suffered in the battle, and he demanded a formal court-martial to clear his name. On November 1, a board of 13 officers declared that Wayne had acted with honor. The site of the battle is part of Malvern.

A monument to the Paoli Massacre, the preserved battlefield, and a parade grounds are located in Malvern. Other sites of interest in neighboring townships include the Wharton Esherick Studio, listed on the National Register of Historic Places in 1973 and designated a National Historic Landmark in 1993.

The church, trains, and a few businesses were the nucleus of this village, which was known for a long period as West Chester Intersection due to its position at the junction of the Philadelphia and Columbia Railroad and the West Chester Railroad.

In 1873, the community’s name was changed to Malvern when the Philadelphia and Columbia's successor, the Pennsylvania Railroad, straightened its tracks through the village. In 1879, the Malvern Friends Meeting was built at the northwest corner of Woodland Avenue and Roberts Lane, followed by the arrival of the Presbyterians and the Methodists prior to 1900.

In 1880, the village's status as a railroad junction came to an end when the West Chester Railroad's northern terminal was moved west to Frazer, Pennsylvania. Malvern Borough has a mix of residential styles and neighborhoods, retail and industrial businesses, dedicated open land, and numerous civic, cultural, and religious organizations.

On August 13, 1889, Malvern was incorporated, and created by separating it from the northern portion of Willistown Township.

On April 22, 2008, the borough converted to a home rule form of government.

== Geography ==
According to the U.S. Census Bureau, the borough has a total area of 1.2 square miles (3.1 km^{2}), all land.

The borough is bordered by Paoli Pike on the south, Sugartown Road on the west, Willistown Township on the east, and East Whiteland Township on the north.

The Malvern ZIP code covers Malvern and all or parts of East Whiteland, Charlestown, Willistown, East Goshen, East Pikeland, and Tredyffrin Townships. Malvern Borough is between Paoli on the east, and Immaculata University and Exton on the west.

== Demographics ==
Historical population
Census	Pop.	Note	%±
1890	641		—
1900	975		52.1%
1910	1,125		15.4%
1920	1,286		14.3%
1930	1,551		20.6%
1940	1,680		8.3%
1950	1,764		5.0%
1960	2,268		28.6%
1970	2,583		13.9%
1980	2,999		16.1%
1990	2,944		−1.8%
2000	3,059		3.9%
2010	2,998		−2.0%
2020	3,419		14.0%
2021 (est.)	3,416	▼	−0.1%

=== 2020 census ===
As of the 2020 census, Malvern had a population of 3,419. The median age was 44.0 years. 18.1% of residents were under the age of 18 and 20.3% of residents were 65 years of age or older. For every 100 females there were 93.5 males, and for every 100 females age 18 and over there were 91.1 males age 18 and over.

100.0% of residents lived in urban areas, while 0.0% lived in rural areas.

There were 1,565 households in Malvern, of which 23.7% had children under the age of 18 living in them. Of all households, 42.3% were married-couple households, 19.2% were households with a male householder and no spouse or partner present, and 31.2% were households with a female householder and no spouse or partner present. About 38.1% of all households were made up of individuals and 16.0% had someone living alone who was 65 years of age or older.

There were 1,657 housing units, of which 5.6% were vacant. The homeowner vacancy rate was 0.6% and the rental vacancy rate was 5.8%.

Racial composition as of the 2020 census
Race	Number	Percent
White	2,847	83.3%
Black or African American	94	2.7%
American Indian and Alaska Native	6	0.2%
Asian	203	5.9%
Native Hawaiian and Other Pacific Islander	0	0.0%
Some other race	54	1.6%
Two or more races	215	6.3%
Hispanic or Latino (of any race)	181	5.3%

=== 2010 census ===
At the time of the 2010 census, the borough was 87.8% non-Hispanic White, 2.9% Black or African American, 0.3% Native American, 4.2% Asian, and 1.9% were two or more races. 3.7% of the population were of Hispanic or Latino ancestry.

=== 2000 census ===
As of the census of 2000, there were 3,059 people, 1,361 households, and 793 families residing in the borough. The population density was 2,444.6 inhabitants per square mile (943.9/km^{2}). There were 1,419 housing units at an average density of 1,134.0 per square mile (437.8/km^{2}). The racial makeup of the borough was 91.11% White, 3.82% African American, 0.20% Native American, 3.24% Asian, 0.26% from other races, and 1.37% from two or more races. Hispanic or Latino of any race were 1.54% of the population.

There were 1,361 households, out of which 23.4% had children under the age of 18 living with them, 46.7% were married couples living together, 8.4% had a female householder with no husband present, and 41.7% were non-families. 34.2% of all households were made up of individuals, and 9.4% had someone living alone who was 65 years of age or older. The average household size was 2.23 and the average family size was 2.92.

In the borough the population was spread out, with 20.1% under the age of 18, 5.2% from 18 to 24, 37.0% from 25 to 44, 22.8% from 45 to 64, and 14.9% who were 65 years of age or older. The median age was 38 years. For every 100 females there were 93.0 males. For every 100 females age 18 and over, there were 87.4 males.

The median income for a household in the borough was $62,308, and the median income for a family was $79,145. Males had a median income of $45,281 versus $39,129 for females. The per capita income for the borough was $35,477. About 0.9% of families and 2.7% of the population were below the poverty line, including 3.8% of those under age 18 and 3.2% of those age 65 or over.

== Economy ==
The Malvern Business and Professional Association promotes Malvern commerce and the borough's unique character. Siemens Healthcare, Ricoh Americas Corporation (formerly IKON Office Solutions), The Vanguard Group, Liberty Property Trust, The Center for Professional Innovation & Education Corporation, Cerner, Vishay Intertechnology, CertainTeed, Endo International and AmericanMuscle are among the companies based in Malvern.

Fisher Feed and Amerigas were two former employers located on East King Street in the Planning Area #10 of the Malvern Borough Comprehensive Plan. This plan amends a zoning ordinance to provide for redeveloping the land once used by the two former employers.

The corporate headquarters of The Vanguard Group and Vishay Intertechnology are located in Malvern.

== Arts and culture ==
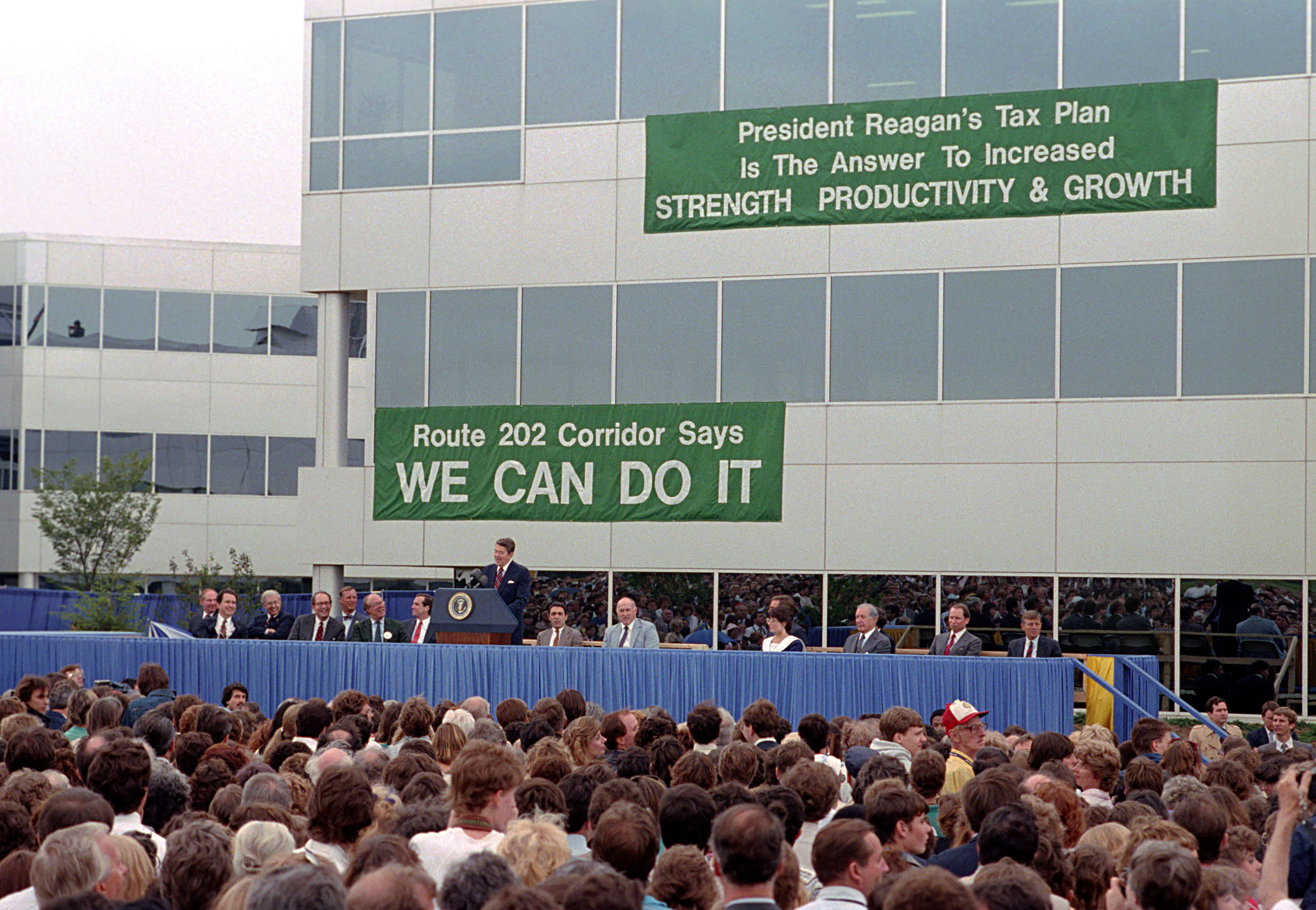
U.S. President Ronald Reagan visiting Malvern in May 1985

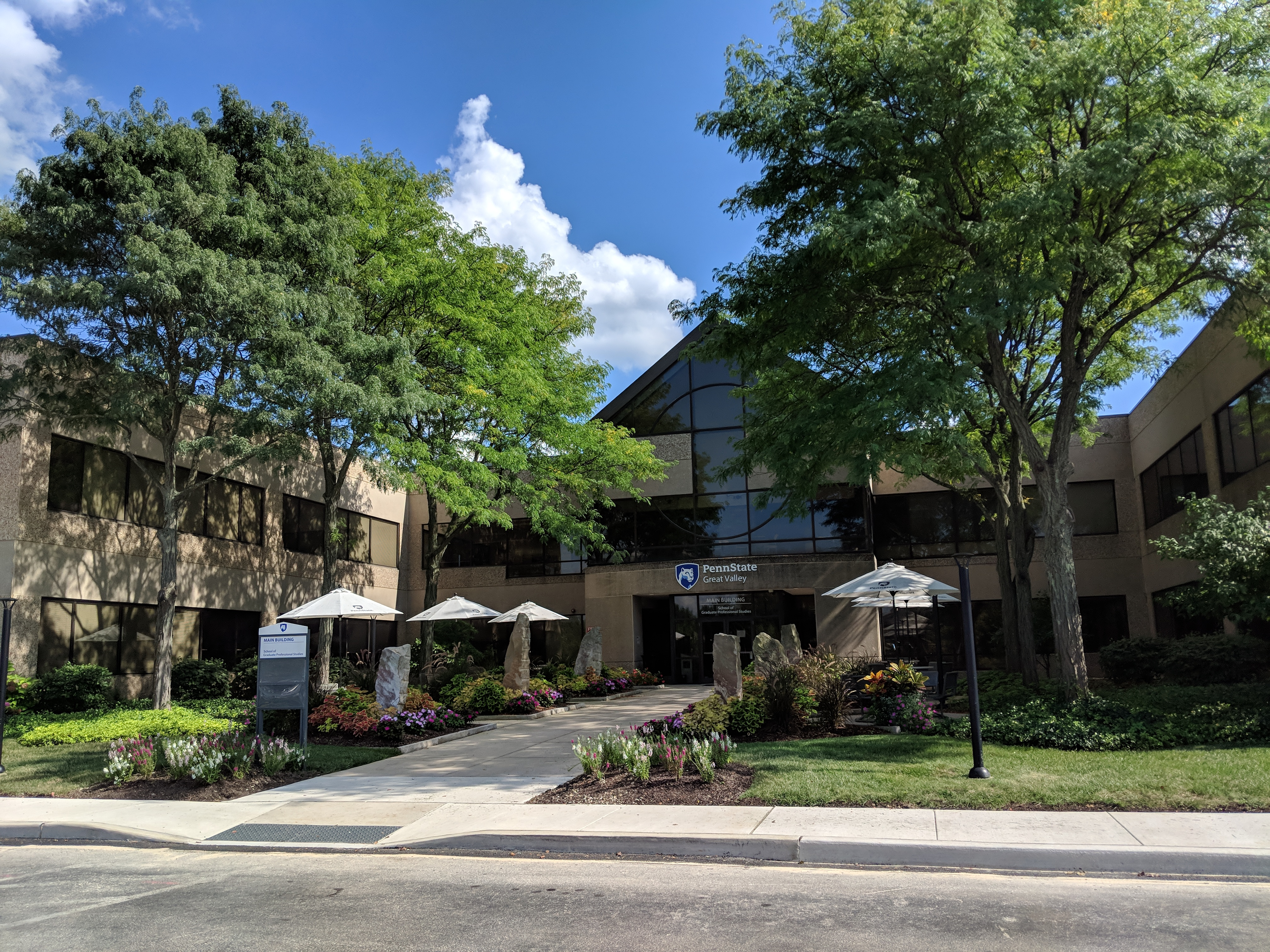
The Main Building at Penn State Great Valley in Malvern, in September 2018

Points of interest include:

- Battle of Paoli, fought in Malvern, now on the National Register of Historic Places
- Annual Memorial Day Parade, first held in 1869, tying Malvern's Parade as the nation's longest continuously held Memorial Day parade
- Victorian Christmas, the first Friday evening and Saturday of December

== Parks and recreation ==
Samuel & M. Elizabeth Burke Park, or simply "Burke Park", includes a pavilion, picnic benches, sitting benches, and a playground. It is located at 15 South Warren Avenue.

Theodore S.A. Rubino Memorial Park is located at the corner of East Broad Street and Old Lincoln Highway. It has a small pavilion with benches as well as a playground.

The Horace J. Quann Memorial Park, is located on the corner of First Ave. and Warren Ave. It includes a baseball/softball field, basketball courts, and access to trails near Massacre Run and Paoli Battlefield.

John and Marion Herzak Park is a public basketball court on the corner of Bridge Street and Old Lincoln Highway.

The Paoli Memorial Grounds Assoc. park is another open space area used for many events and youth sports leagues, including the Chester Valley Little League and Troop 7 boy scouts. There are two full size baseball fields, one small baseball field, a playground, and tennis courts.

Another feature of the memorial grounds is several plaques and stone obelisks, representing American sacrifices in war.

Bordering both the Horace J. Quann Memorial Park and the Paoli Memorial Grounds Assoc. open space, The Paoli Battlefield Site features historic sites and a wooded area with trails. The Massacre Run is also included in the woods.

Randolph Woods is a hiking area on the East side of the borough with Duffryn Trail cutting through and connecting the borough to Willistown Township's Duffryn Mawr, as well as many other trails. There is a trail paralleling Ruth Run through the Malvern Retreat House Forest to Rustmont Village.

== Education ==
=== Public schools ===
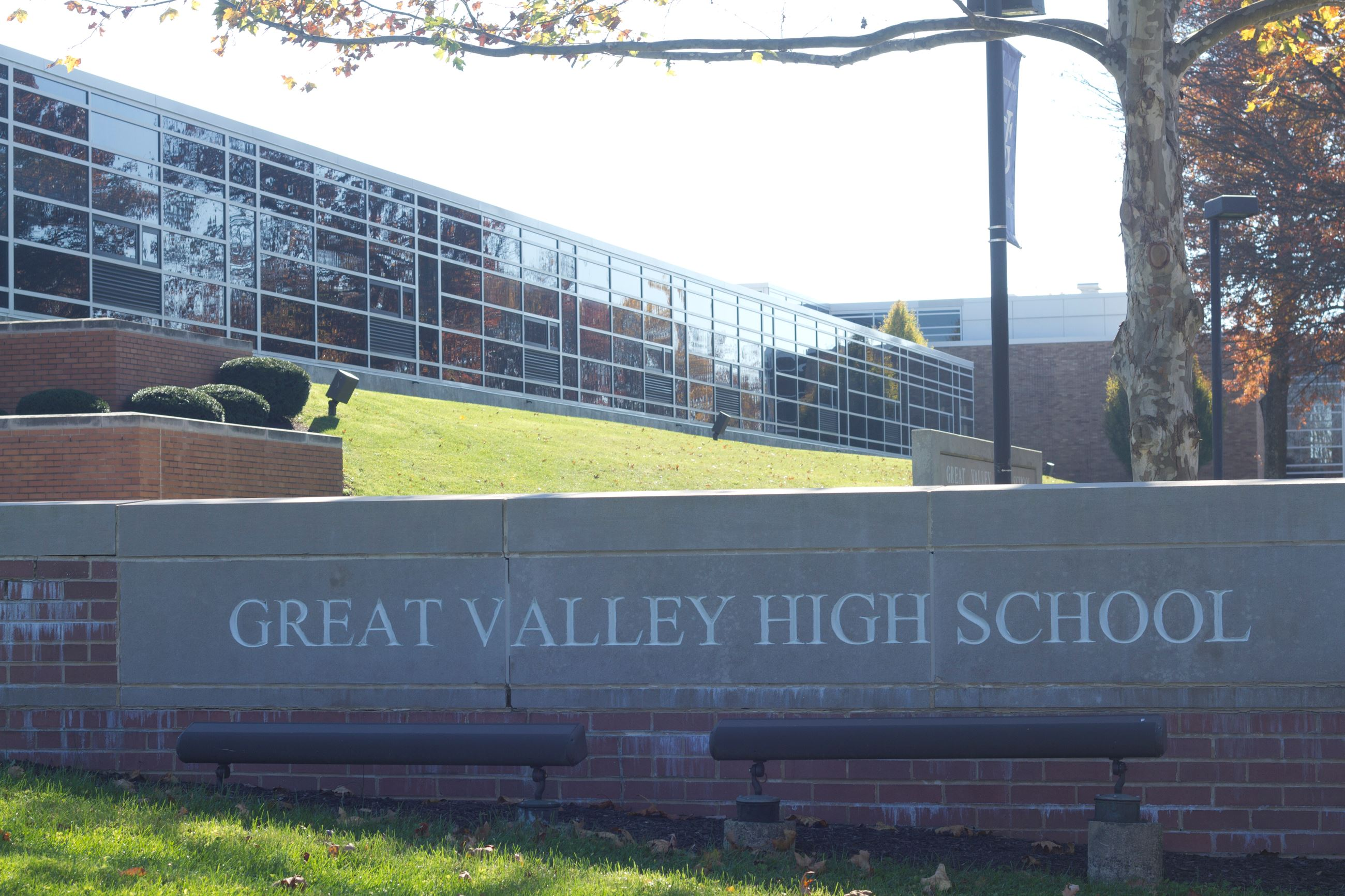
The sign for Great Valley High School outside the school in May 2023

Great Valley School District provides public education in Malvern. Great Valley High School in the district serves students in 9th through 12th grades.

=== Private schools ===
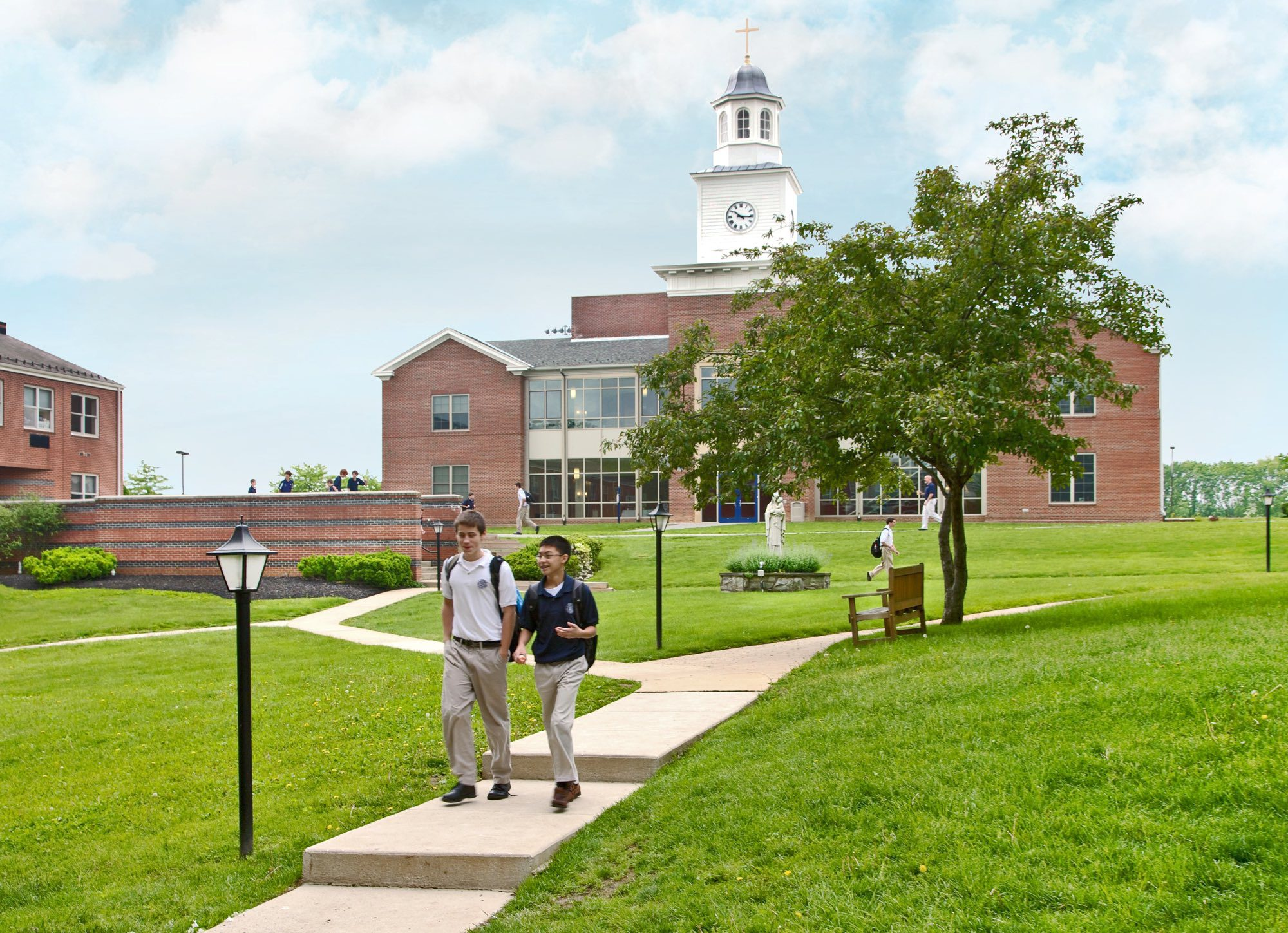
Malvern Preparatory School, a Catholic school in Malvern, in April 2020

The borough has two private schools. Malvern Preparatory School, an independent Catholic School for boys grades 6–12. It was founded by the Order of St. Augustine at Villanova University in 1842 and moved to its present location in 1920. The Willistown Country Day School (Montessori) is for K–6th grade. The borough is also home to a Catholic elementary school for grades K–8, colloquially called St. Patrick's. The St. Patrick School spent the early part of 2012 embattled with the Roman Catholic Archdiocese of Philadelphia over a proposed merger with the St. Monica School of nearby Berwyn, winning their case in March of that year.

Villa Maria Academy is a private, all girls Catholic college preparatory high school (grades 9 to 12) accredited by the Commonwealth of Pennsylvania and Middle States Association of Colleges and Secondary Schools. Villa Maria Academy is located less than a mile to the east of the border of Malvern Borough, in Willistown Township.

Episcopal Academy, Devon Preparatory School, and The Phelps School are also located near Malvern.

Two institutions for higher education include Penn State Great Valley and Immaculata University, both within the Malvern ZIP code.

== Media ==
The Borough of Malvern is served by two newspapers: the Philadelphia Inquirer and Daily Local News. The Inquirer is the paper of record for the greater Philadelphia region, as such its time is spent covering the events of the city and the greater Delaware Valley.

== Infrastructure ==
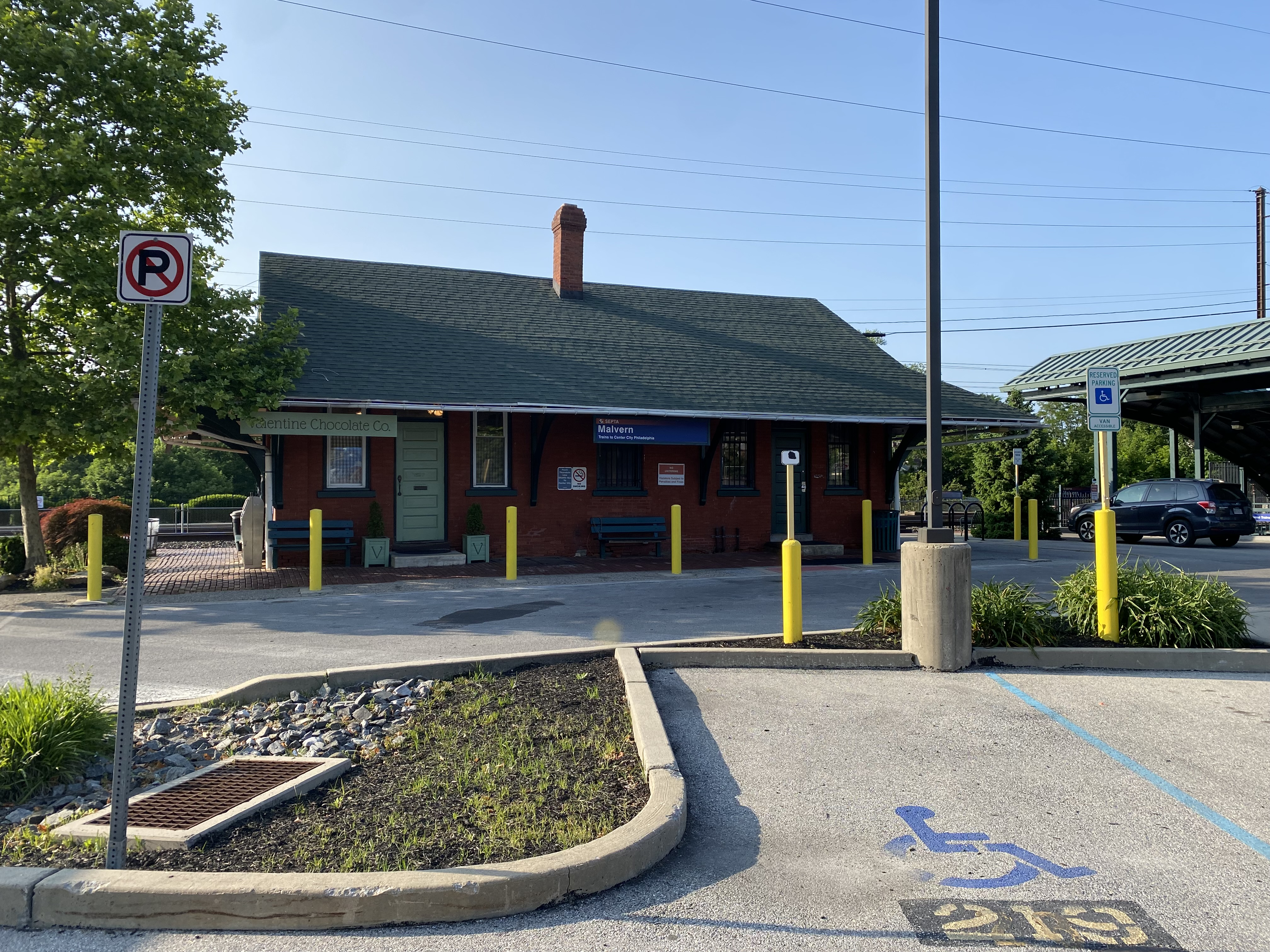
Malvern station

=== Transit ===
Malvern is served by train via the Malvern station connecting it to Center City Philadelphia via SEPTA Regional Rail's Paoli/Thorndale Line. OurBus provides intercity bus service from Malvern to Park Avenue in the Manhattan section in New York City as part of a route running to New York City. The bus stop in Malvern is located at a park and ride lot on Matthews Road. The route started on December 21, 2017.

The borough is also served by SEPTA's 92 Bus, which travels along King Street.

=== Roads ===
As of 2012, there were 10.50 miles (16.90 km) of public roads in Malvern, all of which were maintained by the borough. Main thoroughfares through the borough include King Street and Warren Avenue.

== Notable people ==
- Mikal Bridges, professional basketball player, New York Knicks
- John Eichinger, serial killer on death row
- Phil Gosselin, former professional baseball player
- Harry Hiestand, former offensive line coach for Notre Dame and Chicago Bears assistant coach
- Adam McKay, director, producer, entertainer, and head writer, Saturday Night Live
- Eric S. Raymond, computer programmer, author, and advocate for the open source movement
- Frank Spellman (1922–2017), Olympic gold medalist weightlifter

== In popular culture ==
The preface to Bushido: The Soul of Japan, by Nitobe Inazō, is signed "Malvern, Pa., Twelfth Month, 1899."

== See also ==
- Malvern institute
