= Richard Baumhammers =

American mass murderer on death row

- Baumhammers in a 2023 prison photograph
- Born: Richard Scott Baumhammers; May 17, 1965 (age 61); Pittsburgh, Pennsylvania, U.S.
- Citizenship: United States, Latvia
- Education: Kent State University, Cumberland Law School, and University of the Pacific's McGeorge School of Law
- Convictions: First degree murder (5 counts) and others
- Penalty: Death

Details
- Locations: Allegheny and Beaver County, Pennsylvania
- Killed: 5
- Injured: 1
- Weapon: .357 Smith & Wesson revolver

Richard Scott Baumhammers (born May 17, 1965) is an American spree killer and white supremacist who committed a racially motivated shooting spree on April 28, 2000, in the metropolitan area of Pittsburgh, Pennsylvania, killing five people and paralyzing one.

== Early life ==
Richard Baumhammers was born in Pittsburgh, Pennsylvania, to Andrejs and Inese Baumhammers, both Lutheran Latvian immigrants who fled the Soviet occupation of their homeland. Both parents became faculty members of the University of Pittsburgh's School of Dental Medicine and opened a successful practice on Fifth Avenue, near the university. Baumhammers was the second child to Andrejs and Inese; his older sister Daina was born in 1963. The family settled in the Pittsburgh suburb of Mt. Lebanon. Baumhammers was a second-string kicker on the Mt. Lebanon High School football team.

After completing high school in 1983, Baumhammers graduated from Kent State University in Ohio in 1989 and began law school at Cumberland Law School in Birmingham, Alabama. A Cumberland classmate described Baumhammers as "gregarious, a good student, in the top third of his class." After graduating from Cumberland, Baumhammers enrolled in a specialized one-year international program at the University of the Pacific's McGeorge School of Law in Sacramento, California, where he received a master's degree in transnational business practice and specialized in both immigration law and international law.

For several years in the mid-1990s, Baumhammers lived in Atlanta, Georgia, where he was listed with the International Law Section members of the Georgia Bar Association. He was an active member as of March 2000.

== Mental health ==
Richard Baumhammers returned to Pittsburgh in the late 1990s and lived with his parents following a series of emotional problems. Baumhammers had been treated for mental illness since 1993 and had voluntarily admitted himself to a psychiatric ward at least twice. Later, he would obsess about his physical appearance, believing that his face had been scarred by sunlight. However, dermatologists told Baumhammers that his skin was "perfectly normal." His father, Andrejs, would later say that he had seen signs of mental illness since Baumhammers was four years old.

Andrejs would also claim later that Baumhammers told his parents that he could no longer speak openly to them because he believed the FBI was monitoring the house. Baumhammers insisted that his parents had to go into the basement to talk with him, using a pen and notepad. Andrejs Baumhammers claimed that Baumhammers even asked at one point to be taken to Dr. Kevorkian to help him commit suicide.

In May 1999, Richard Baumhammers admitted himself to Pittsburgh's Western Psychiatric Institute hospital and was diagnosed with delusional disorder of the persecutional type by Dr. Matcheri Keshavan. Over the next several years, Baumhammers would see eight psychiatrists, four clinical psychologists and try 16 different medications. After his release, Baumhammers stayed with his parents in their Mt. Lebanon home. He was a member of the Allegheny County Bar Association until he let his membership lapse in 1999.

== Travel abroad ==
In 1993 Baumhammers traveled to Europe for a vacation, and upon returning home, his father was shocked by his son's emotional state. Andrejs would later testify that Baumhammers told him that during a visit to Ukraine, he became "euphoric"; but that by the time he traveled to Finland, he believed people were following and harassing him.

In 1997, the now-unemployed Baumhammers traveled to Riga, Latvia, where he lived in an apartment on Kr. Barona Avenue which was less than a block from where his grandparents had lived in the mid-1930s. He acquired Latvian citizenship and sought to regain some of the family's properties lost during the Soviet occupation of Latvia. He made a claim under Latvia's de-nationalization process but was too late, as any claims had been required to be filed by 1996.

According to several people who associated with him in Latvia, Baumhammers mainly kept to himself. When he did socialize, he seemed to have felt most comfortable spending time with native Latvians and a few passing Latvian Americans. Those who met him in Latvia said they did not recall Baumhammers being prone to violence or ever espousing any racist remarks, and the Latvian government has no record of Baumhammers ever getting in trouble with authorities. Several Latvian acquaintances, however, described Baumhammers as intent on meeting women but "awkward."

== White supremacism ==
While living in Latvia, Baumhammers published writings on his website, "The Free Market Party", in which he claimed that White Americans were being "outnumbered" by minority groups and voiced an admiration for Adolf Hitler and Timothy McVeigh. He called for "an end to non-white immigration" and stated that "almost all" present-day immigration "is non-European". He attempted to gain followers who shared this belief and intended to found a political party by the same name, but was ultimately unsuccessful in recruiting a single member, closing the site by 2000. He also attempted to establish contact with the John Birch Society, but was rejected by its chairman, John F. McManus, who described Baumhammers as a "nut".

In the fall of 1999, while in France, Baumhammers was arrested in Paris for striking a 50-year-old bartender because he "believed she was Jewish." Baumhammers then told both the victim and the arresting officers that he was "mentally ill." The police took Baumhammers for evaluation to the psychiatric ward of the Hôtel-Dieu de Paris, then detained him at a police station. By week's end, he left on a flight for Spain.

On April 30, 1999, Baumhammers bought a Smith & Wesson .357 Magnum revolver in South Strabane Township, Pennsylvania, nine days before being diagnosed with delusional disorder. While living with his parents, Baumhammers frequently accessed white supremacist websites, and was a registered user on the neo-Nazi Stormfront forum. He downloaded treatise material encouraging lone wolf attacks as a terrorist tactic by the White Aryan Resistance (WAR), writings by William Pierce, and white power music by the skinhead band Aggressive Force. Via Stormfront's dating portal, Baumhammers entered a brief relationship with a woman associated with Matthew Hale's World Church of the Creator.

On March 1, 2000, a mass shooting occurred in Wilkinsburg, Pennsylvania, in which three people were killed. Because the perpetrator, Ronald Taylor, was black and the victims were white, Baumhammers was inspired to carry out the shootings as a retaliatory copycat crime.

== Shooting ==
On April 28, 2000, at 1:30 p.m. EDT, Richard Baumhammers walked to the home of his Jewish next-door neighbor, 63-year-old Anita "Nicki" Gordon, and fatally shot her, then set her house on fire. Gordon had been friends with Baumhammers' parents for 31 years. Afterwards, Baumhammers left town in his Jeep Cherokee and drove to numerous suburbs around Allegheny County.

In Scott Township, Baumhammers went to the Beth El Congregation synagogue, where Gordon was a member and fired into the synagogue's windows from his car. He then exited his vehicle and spray-painted two red swastikas and the word "Jew" on the building. A short distance from the synagogue at the India Grocer in Scott Town Center, Baumhammers shot to death 31-year-old Anil Thakur, formerly of Bihar, India, who had been picking up groceries during his lunch hour. Baumhammers also shot 25-year-old store manager Sandip Patel once in the neck and once in the upper back, paralyzing him. Patel would use a wheelchair for the next seven years before dying at the age of 32 on February 3, 2007, from complications due to pneumonia at UPMC, in McCandless, Pennsylvania.

After a stop in Carnegie, where he shot out the windows of Congregation Ahavath Achim, Baumhammers drove to Robinson Township and entered the Robinson Town Centre. Inside, he opened fire at Ya Fei Chinese Cuisine where he fatally shot 34-year-old Chinese restaurant manager Ji-ye Sun and 27-year-old Vietnamese American delivery driver Thao "Tony" Pham in front of customers.

From Robinson Town Center, Baumhammers drove to the C.S. Kim School of Karate in Center Township, Beaver County where Garry Lee, a 22-year-old African American was exercising with a European American friend, George Thomas II. Baumhammers initially pointed the gun at Thomas, then turned and fired at Lee, killing him instantly.

Richard Baumhammers was pulled over in his Jeep and arrested at 3:30 p.m. EDT in the town of Ambridge, Pennsylvania. Baumhammers' spree lasted two hours and ran a 15-mile trail that spanned two counties and crossed three townships.

When Pittsburgh police officers searched Baumhammers' Mt. Lebanon home, they found a three-page document, described as a manifesto, which "advocated the rights of European Americans" and called for violence against "third world" immigrants. The document was signed by Baumhammers and named him as the "chairman" of the "Free Market Party".

== Trial and incarceration ==
On May 1, 2000, Baumhammers was charged with 19 crimes which included five counts of criminal homicides, one count of attempted homicide, eight counts of ethnic intimidation, two counts of arson, two counts of criminal mischief, one count of arson, one count of reckless endangerment of another person, one count of violation of uniform firearms act, two counts of institution vandalism and one count of aggravated assault. His bond was set at $1 million.

On May 19, 2000, Allegheny County Common Pleas Judge Lawrence J. O'Toole ruled that Baumhammers was unfit to stand trial and ordered that Baumhammers undergo at least 90 days of psychiatric treatment. O'Toole made his decision after three psychiatrists examined Baumhammers, each coming to the conclusion that Baumhammers was psychologically unstable. The psychiatrists agreed that he was psychotic but used different words to describe his condition: paranoid schizophrenic, psychotic thought disorder, and delusional disorder. These confused reporters.

On May 9, 2001, a jury found Richard Baumhammers guilty on all nineteen charges. On May 11, 2001, after deliberating for 20 minutes, the same jury requested that Baumhammers be executed for his crimes. During the verdict, judge Jeffrey Manning stated that Baumhammers had been "coaxed and coached" through online extremist material and compared him to former Church of the Creator member Benjamin Smith, the perpetrator of the 1999 Independence Day weekend shootings. Baumhammers was scheduled to die by lethal injection. He was incarcerated at Greene State Correctional Institute in Franklin Township, Pennsylvania.

On January 19, 2010, Pennsylvania Governor Ed Rendell signed an execution warrant for Baumhammers. He was scheduled to be put to death on March 18, 2010. On February 28, 2010, Allegheny County Judge Jeffrey A. Manning granted Baumhammers an indefinite stay of execution.

On November 26, 2019, Baumhammers lost an appeal of his conviction and death sentence.

== Aftermath ==
Shortly after the shooting, WAR founder Tom Metzger praised Baumhammers' actions, calling it "Aryan justice in a down home way".

In 2000, the families of three of the five shooting victims filed a civil suit against Baumhammers' parents, citing negligence by failing to take away their son's guns. The insurance providers of the Baumhammers family were asked to treat each shooting incident as a separate occurrence and pay up to $5,000,000 to the victims. USAA refused to indemnify in the instance as criminal acts were not included in their policy. Donegal Insurance was also not obligated to pay, as it did not recognize the shootings, whether separate or collectively, as an occurrence. In 2009, it was agreed that the civil suit, by then seeking $31 million, would be settled out of court.

== See also ==
- List of attacks on Jewish institutions in the United States
- List of death row inmates in the United States
