= Cuckooing =

Form of crime

Cuckooing is a form of action, termed by the police, in which the home of a vulnerable person is taken over by a criminal in order to use it to deal, store or take drugs, facilitate sex work, as a place for them to live, or to financially abuse the tenant. The practice is associated with county lines drug trafficking. It is also known to occur as part of mate crime, the act of befriending a person with the intent to exploit them.

The term cuckooing comes from the cuckoo's practice of taking over other birds' nests for its young. In this context, the term was mentioned in 1992 by Michael E. Buerger, was subsequently overlooked, and then regained wider use from 2010. In the 2010s, cuckooing was becoming an increasingly common problem in the South of England.

In 2023, Labour MP Jess Phillips and Conservative MP Iain Duncan Smith called for cuckooing to be criminalised as part of a review of the Modern Slavery Act 2015.

The Crime and Policing Act 2026 made cuckooing a specific criminal offence.
