= Murder of Jennifer Daugherty =

2010 murder in Greensburg, Pennsylvania, United States

Jennifer Daugherty
- Daugherty in February 2007
- Born: Jennifer Lee Daugherty; November 8, 1979; Mount Pleasant, Pennsylvania, U.S.
- Died: February 11, 2010 (aged 30); Greensburg, Pennsylvania, U.S.
- Known for: Mentally disabled woman who was tortured and stabbed to death by "The Greensburg Six"

Jennifer Lee Daugherty (November 8, 1979 – February 11, 2010) was an American woman from Mount Pleasant, Pennsylvania, who was killed by a group of people later referred to as The Greensburg Six, in an act of revenge, in February 2010. Daugherty, who was mentally disabled, was humiliated, tortured, sexually assaulted and murdered by a group of individuals she considered to be her new circle of friends. Her body was wrapped in Christmas decorations, placed inside a trash can and discarded in the parking lot of Greensburg-Salem Middle School.

Trials for all six perpetrators lasted over 12 years, spanning between 2010 and 2022, resulting in sentences varying between the death penalty and 20–80 years in prison.

The case garnered national attention for its brutality and led to proposed legislative changes, such as “Jennifer’s Law,” which would criminalize failing to report violent crimes witnessed in the state of Pennsylvania. The initiative was signed into law in 2012.

== Perpetrators ==
The Greensburg Six
- Top left: Melvin Knight, Top center: Ricky Ven Smyrnes, Top right: Angela Marinucci; Bottom left: Peggy Darlene Miller; Bottom center: Robert Loren Masters; Bottom right: Amber Meidinger
- Motive: Unknown, possibly revenge
- Convictions: Death (Smyrnes, Knight); Life in prison without parole; commuted to 60 years to life in prison (Marinucci), 30-80 years in prison (Masters, Meidinger, Miller)

Details
- Victims: 1
- Date: February 11, 2010; 16 years ago
- Date apprehended: February 12, 2010

Amber Meidinger met Melvin Knight at a homeless shelter in Washington in January 2010. They moved to several locations before settling in Greensburg, Pennsylvania, where they met Jennifer Daugherty. Knight met Ricky Smyrnes after meeting previously in jail.

Knight and accomplice Angela Marinucci both were alleged to have suffered from severe mental impairment at the time of the murder. Knight was born to a drug-addicted father who was imprisoned during the early years of his life. He developed lifelong learning and social disabilities after he fell out of a moving vehicle and hit his head at age 5. According to testimony by Marinucci's mother and half-sister, she suffered a head injury when she was hit by a truck in 2008, at the age of 15. The injury substantially altered her behavior and pushed her into a downward spiral that ended with Daugherty's death, according to the defense. Two mental experts testified that Marinucci suffered from depression as a child and might have had drug and alcohol addictions as a teenager.

Peggy Miller and Robert Masters were roommates of Ricky Smyrnes and had minimal contact with law enforcement prior to the murder. Smyrnes was born to a drug-addicted Philadelphia sex worker and a Pittsburgh gang member. He was moved into and out of foster homes as a child and was treated for mental health disorders as early as age 4. He suffered abuse and neglect until he was taken in by the Smyrnes family in North Huntingdon at age 10, according to testimony by forensic psychologist Alice Applegate. His lawyer, Terri Fayes, told the jury that Smyrnes suffered sexual and physical abuse from his father and his uncle. She also explained how he had tried beer, cocaine, heroin, and marijuana by age 6, had been diagnosed with PTSD at age 8, and had undergone 103 therapy sessions by age 10. She added he was diagnosed as having as many as seven different personalities, and 15 total psychiatric issues. In 1997, he burglarized his neighbor's home and stole knives, guitars, coins, bullets, and cash. That same year, he sexually assaulted a woman in her basement.

Meidinger testified she and Knight, her then-boyfriend, met Smyrnes on February 8, 2010, after the couple had been staying at a Greensburg-area hotel. Smyrnes invited Meidinger and Knight to stay at his apartment at 428 N. Pennsylvania Avenue in Greensburg, where the murder would occur three days later.

== Abduction and torture ==
Daugherty's last recorded words were a note to her mother that said, “Mom, I hope you have a good day at work, and I love you very much. Love, Jennifer”.

Meidinger told jurors, "at some point, she [Daugherty] trusted me because she knew me from the West Place (a center for people with special needs)." The friendship led to Daugherty traveling from her home in Mount Pleasant to Smyrnes' apartment on Monday, February 8, 2010. She was then held captive for three days where she was tortured repeatedly.

According to testimony by Meidinger, the group went through Daugherty's purse and stole money, gift cards, and her cell phone. They poured liquids into her bag, hit her head with filled soda bottles, cut her hair, painted her face with nail polish, and dumped liquid and spices on her head. Meidinger said she and Angela Marinucci took turns violently hitting Daugherty with a metal towel rack and crutches. She also noted that Daugherty was stripped naked, gagged, and raped by Knight. They also forced her to consume feces, urine, and detergent. Meidinger also said Knight took Daugherty to the living room where Marinucci poured a bottle of water over Daugherty's head and Knight and Smyrnes dumped oatmeal and spices on her head. Daugherty said that her eyes were burning, and Smyrnes told her to take a shower because she smelled bad.

According to her relatives, Daugherty had the mental abilities of an adolescent, trusted everyone, and thought that the suspects were her "friends."

== Murder ==
Several witnesses claimed Marinucci planned to kill Daugherty several days before the rest began planning. They testified Marinucci overheard Smyrnes calling Daugherty and telling her that he loved her and wanted to marry her. Smyrnes, who was 25-years-old at the time, was in a relationship with 17-year-old Marinucci. During Smyrnes' testimony, he told jurors about the alleged love triangle between Daugherty, Marinucci, and Smyrnes.

According to his testimony, Masters helped Daugherty retrieve her clothes that Knight and Smyrnes had stripped from her and tossed out a window on the first day of the beatings. Before Daugherty could get her clothes and get out, Knight and Smyrnes returned to the apartment at 428 N. Pennsylvania Ave. As a result, the group voted to kill her. Miller decided to tie her with Christmas lights. They forced her to write a fake suicide note and then stabbed her to death. Smyrnes gave Knight a steak knife and stabbed her in the chest and throat. Her body was stuffed inside a garbage can, and dumped in the parking lot of Greensburg-Salem Middle School. Marinucci told police officials that Knight and Meidinger drugged her before stabbing her.

== Trial ==
At the start of the trial on November 3, 2010, the prosecution was seeking the death penalty for Smyrnes, Knight and Meidinger. However, as of July 31, 2026, Knight and Smyrnes are the only convicts on death row.

Several jail inmates testified that Marinucci planned to kill Daugherty several days before her body was discovered. Neighbor Anthony Zappone heard Marinucci say, "I'm going to kill that bitch." He was also sentenced to jail for an unrelated burglary charge. Tina Warrick testified Marinucci told her she was disappointed with the type of Christmas garland Miller purchased to tie Daugherty up and dump her body. Floria Headen heard body slamming and screaming on February 12, 2010. Felisha Hardison, who was a cellmate and friend to Marinucci, testified that she was jumping on her bed, excited to be on the news.

Masters and Meidinger reached a plea bargain to testify.

=== Sentencing ===
On April 12, 2012, Knight pleaded guilty to first- and second-degree murder, kidnapping, and conspiracy to commit murder and kidnapping. On August 30, 2012, a jury deliberated for several hours, before voting to put Knight to death. In September 2014, Knight appealed his sentence. His trial was delayed several times, and his sentence was upheld in March 2019. In November 2020, Knight attempted to appeal his sentence via the Supreme Court of Pennsylvania. The appeal included statements and claims that jurors acted with passion and prejudice and arbitrarily imposed the death penalty. However, it was unanimously rejected by the judges.

"Following our thorough review of the record, in this case, we conclude that the appellant’s sentence of death was not the product of passion, prejudice, or any other arbitrary factor, but rather was fully supported by the evidence that (Knight) and his co-defendants held the intellectually disabled victim against her will for several days, during which time they continuously subjected her to myriad forms of physical and emotional torture, eventually stabbing her in the chest, slicing her throat (and) strangling her"

— Debra Todd,

On August 3, 2011, Marinucci was formally given a mandatory life sentence without the possibility of parole after being found guilty in May of first-degree murder. She was 17 years old at the time of the crime so she was ineligible for the death penalty, as she was still a minor. Marinucci had her life without possibility of parole sentence revoked, due to the 2012 and 2016 Supreme Court rulings Miller v. Alabama and Montgomery v. Louisiana. However, on July 1, 2015, a jury decided to re-sentence her to her previous sentence. Marinucci refused to answer any questions before she attended. In May 2022, Marinucci was resentenced to 60 years to life in prison with parole eligibility in 2070.

On December 4, 2013, Meidinger was sentenced to 40 to 80 years in prison after pleading guilty to third-degree murder, kidnapping, and conspiracy. Meidinger filed paperwork in November 2019 with the state's Board of Pardons, seeking early termination of her 40- to 80-year prison sentence.

Amber Meidinger almost received the death penalty until she agreed to testify against the others. The Westmoreland County District Attorney decided not to pursue the death penalty. Her defense attorney, Tim Dawson, questioned why she wanted to testify. During the testimony, she admitted she lied about the state of her mental health. Meidinger falsely told police officers that she had mental issues.

Peggy Darlene Miller was sentenced to 35 to 74 years. On February 28, 2013, Smyrnes was sentenced to death. Smyrnes appealed his sentence. In February 2017, a judge upheld his death sentence. His execution was delayed in July 2017. Robert Loren Masters Jr. pleaded guilty to third-degree murder, conspiracy to commit murder, and conspiracy to commit kidnapping on December 19, 2013. Masters was sentenced to 30 to 70 years. Masters' attorney, William Gallishen, helped Masters reach a plea bargain against the other five. After he agreed, he was moved to another jail for protection because other suspects were being held there. He did not publicly share any information related to the plea bargain.

== Incarceration ==
Robert Loren Masters is currently imprisoned in the State Correctional Institution – Greene, Ricky Ven Smyrnes and Melvin Knight are in the State Correctional Institution – Phoenix, Peggy Darlene Miller and Amber Meidinger are in the State Correctional Institution – Muncy, and Angela Marinucci is imprisoned in the State Correctional Institution – Cambridge Springs.

== Legacy ==
Forensic pathologist and former Allegheny County Coroner Cyril H. Wecht, who had conducted and reviewed thousands of autopsies of homicide victims, stated, "... This is one of the most horrific cases I have seen... You have one young, defenseless woman, six people who are keeping her captive and doing all of these things, knowing she is [mentally challenged]. Put it all together, it is bizarre, it is extreme barbarism."

On April 23, 2012, at a conference, Pennsylvania State Senator Kim Ward proposed a legislation law named "Jennifer's Law." The proposal would make it illegal for someone to witness a violent crime and fail to report it to the police. Failure to report the crime would be a misdemeanor of the third degree.

"Cruel Intentions", an episode of Frenemies: Loyalty Turned Lethal, is a biopic based on the events.

== See also ==
- Murder of Gemma Hayter
- The Dinner
