= Joe Ligon =

American former prisoner

- Born: Joseph Ligon; May 3, 1938 (age 88); Philadelphia, Pennsylvania, U.S.
- Known for: Longest serving US prisoner convicted as a minor (served prison sentence from aged 15-82)
- Status: Released
- Conviction: First degree murder (2 counts)
- Penalty: Life imprisonment without parole; later vacated

Details
- Country: United States
- State: Pennsylvania

Joseph Ligon (born May 3, 1938) is an American convicted murderer and former prisoner. He was America's longest-serving prisoner who was convicted of two counts of first-degree murder by association and sentenced to life imprisonment without parole as a juvenile, at the age of 15. After the Supreme Court had ruled in Montgomery v. Louisiana that all mandatory juvenile life without parole sentences were retroactively unconstitutional, he was released without parole in February 2021 after a federal court vacated his sentence, having spent 68 years in prison.

== Early life ==
Ligon was born on May 3, 1938, in Philadelphia, Pennsylvania, the second oldest of four children. His mother was a nurse, while his father was an auto mechanic.

He grew up on a farm in Birmingham, Alabama, with his maternal grandparents and had a difficult early life. Ligon did not grow up with many friends, and instead remembers spending most of his time with his family, such as watching his grandfather preach in a local church on Sundays.

At age 13, Ligon moved back to South Philadelphia to live in a blue-collar neighborhood with his family. He attended Thomas Durham School, where he was enrolled in the "orthogenically backward" ("O.B.") program for special education. At the time he dropped out of school, he was in third or fourth grade, had not played any sports and was not able to read or write.

== Murders and sentencing ==
On February 20, 1953, while living in South Philadelphia, Ligon was part of an alcohol-fueled stabbing spree with five teenagers that resulted in the death of Charles Pitts and Jackson Hamm and the injury of six others. He met up with two teenagers he knew casually and they came across two other teenagers, previously unknown to him, who were drinking wine. They began robbing people in order to try and purchase alcohol.

After Ligon was arrested, he claimed he was not permitted legal representation or family visitation and signed confessions put in front of him by the police. The attorney instructed him to plead guilty to the murders at the one-day trial. Ligon and the other defendants had a one-day trial and they were convicted of first-degree murder and sentenced to life without the possibility of parole.

At the time of his trial, Ligon admitted to stabbing Clarence Belvey, who survived the attack, in the chest. He has affirmed his guilt for the stabbing and expressed remorse subsequently. He has repeatedly denied being responsible for either murder.

== Parole ==
In the early 1970s, Ligon and his accomplices were offered clemency by the governor. Ligon, however, was the only one to reject the offer since he would have to be on parole for the rest of his life.

Bradley Bridge, his attorney for 15 years, said that Ligon had been found guilty by association and that if he were tried today, he would more likely be convicted of manslaughter and sentenced to around 5–10 years. Bridge said giving an adult sentence to a child is inherently wrong.

In 2012, life sentences for juveniles without the possibility of parole were ruled to be unconstitutional in the US Supreme Court. In 2016, the Supreme Court said that the 2012 ruling was retroactive. In 2017, Ligon was re-sentenced to 35 years in jail and became eligible for parole due to the time already served. Ligon felt his sentence had always been unconstitutional, so he returned to court to argue against the parole. The federal court agreed and on February 11, 2021, he was released without parole.

== Release ==
Ligon was released on February 11, 2021, from State Correctional Institution - Phoenix. When Bridge arrived to pick him up, Ligon was completely calm—there was no dramatic reaction. A month later, Ligon described his release by saying, "It was like being born all over again. Because everything was new to me—just about everything." Following his release, Ligon moved into a rowhome in West Philadelphia and shared plans to seek employment as a janitor, attend the Bible Way Baptist Church, get a gym membership, and reconnect with family, including his sister, nieces, and nephews in New Jersey.

With 68 years spent behind bars, Ligon became the longest-serving juvenile lifer, in American history upon his release. The Vera Institute of Justice estimated that his incarceration cost the state of Pennsylvania nearly $3 million ($44,000 per year).
