= Murder of Gemma Hayter =

2010 murder case in the United Kingdom

Gemma Hayter (13 September 1982 – 8 August 2010) was an English disabled woman who was tortured and murdered by three people she considered her friends in Rugby, Warwickshire, England on 8 August 2010. Kathy McAteer, the chairman of a commission investigating the circumstances of the murder, was paraphrased by Harvey Day of BBC Three as stating that the case was a "mate crime".

== Background ==
As a child, Hayter was found to be autistic. Hayter was never formally diagnosed, but her family suspected she had a mental disability. At age 14, she began attending a school specifically for disabled students; this was the first time that such an institution had given her an enrollment space. When she was an adult, an evaluator determined she was not autistic. Hayter had asked the local government for assistance with employment and her general welfare.

Hayter, aged 27 at the time of her death, was severely beaten and tortured by Daniel Newstead, Newstead's girlfriend Chantelle Booth, and Joe Boyer. Duncan Edwards and Jessica Lynas also conspired in the murder. Hayter had formed friendships with all five. Both Newstead and Booth asked her to place illegal drugs in her flat and to steal items for them.

On 7 August 2010, Hayter made a joke about Booth being underage when the group visited a pub, leading to them being banned from local drinking establishments after this was shared via PubWatch. The group was angered by this and attacked Hayter. All five perpetrators originated from Rugby.

== Torture and murder ==
The attack began the next day when Hayter visited Booth's flat. The perpetrators forced her to drink urine, and threw her body against a radiator, breaking her nose. Hayter was also struck with a mop, and for a period of time, locked in a toilet.

The group took Hayter out of Booth's flat, and told her that they would escort her home. They instead took her to a railway embankment, where the group put a bin liner on her head, stamped on her body, and stabbed her in the back once. The group removed her clothes and attempted to ignite them. Hayter's body was found on 9 August 2010.

== Sentencing ==
Newstead, Booth, and Boyer were 20, 22, and 18 years old at the time of their sentencing to life imprisonment. Their minimum tariffs are respectively 20, 21, and 18 years. Edwards and Lynas received manslaughter convictions; both were 19 at the time of their sentencing. Their sentences were 15 and 13 years. The sentencing for all five occurred at Old Bailey. The BBC wrote that the sentences were "longer than expected".

== Aftermath ==
The Warwickshire authorities wrote a serious case review, concluding that Hayter had been at risk, and suggested that relevant agencies exchange details to prevent similar incidents from happening. Hayter's parents believed that local authorities had not done enough to care for her.

A documentary was made about her murder, titled Gemma: My Murder, by BBC Three.

As of 2017, Jessica Lynas was being held at HM Prison Foston Hall.

== See also ==
- Jean Pormanove
- Murder of Jennifer Daugherty
- Murder of Shakira Spencer
