= State Correctional Institution – Somerset =

All-male prison in Pennsylvania, US

Coordinates: 39°57′52″N 79°02′21″W

State Correctional Institution - Somerset
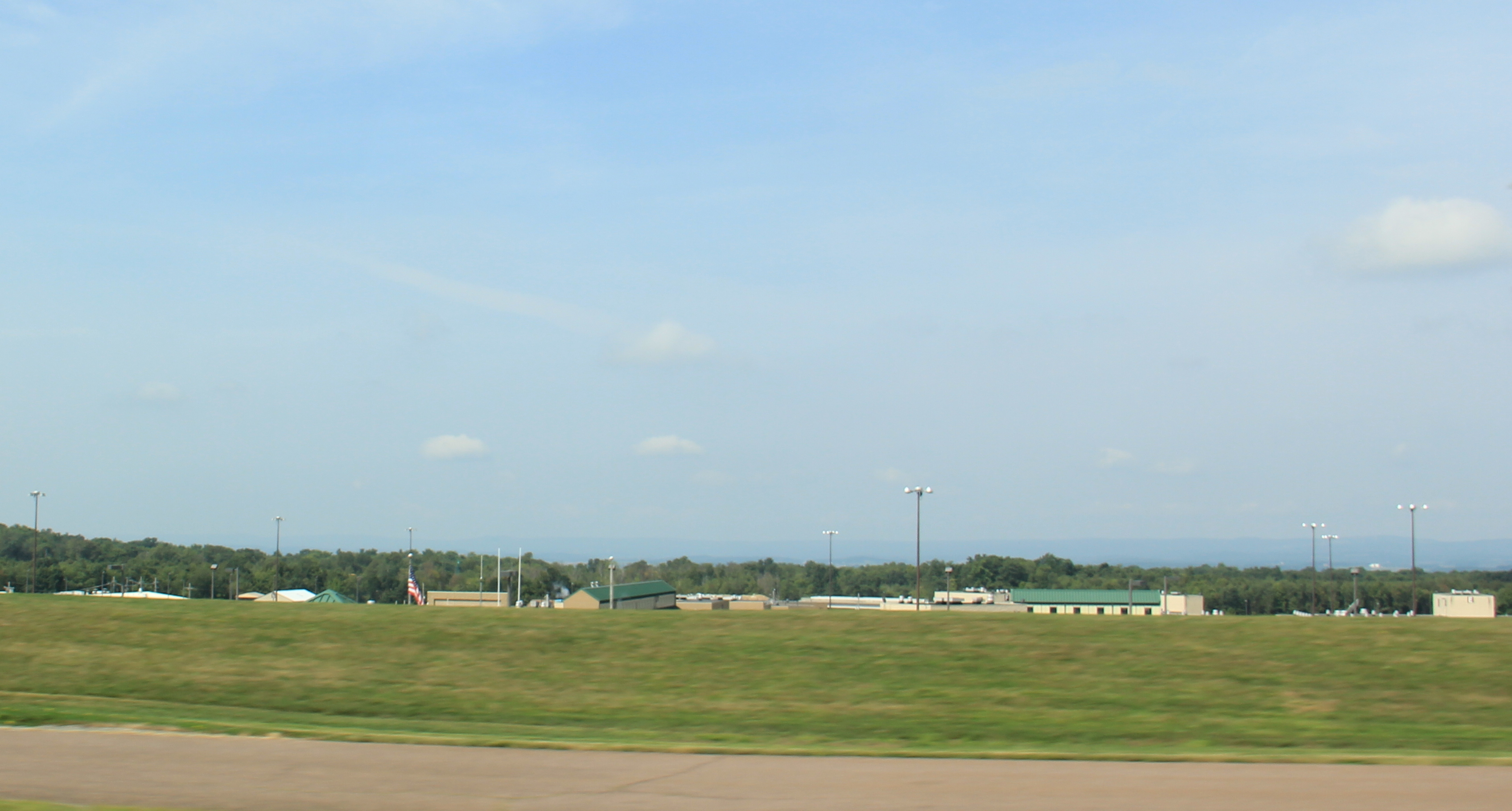
- Interactive map of State Correctional Institution - Somerset
- Location: Somerset Township / Brothersvalley Township, Somerset County, Pennsylvania
- Status: Open
- Security class: Medium security
- Capacity: 1,600
- Opened: 1993
- Managed by: Pennsylvania Department of Corrections

State Correctional Institution – Somerset is a medium-security, all-male correctional facility located outside Somerset, Pennsylvania, about 70 miles (110 km) southeast of Pittsburgh, and about 5 miles (8.0 km) off the Somerset Interchange of the Pennsylvania Turnpike. In March 2024, 44 of Pennsylvania's death row inmates were moved to Somerset. They were previously at SCI Phoenix, which continues to house other death penalty prisoners.

Almost all of the prison is in Somerset Township, while a small portion is in Brothersvalley Township. The total land area is 240 acres (97 ha).

== Construction of SCI - Somerset ==
SCI – Somerset was constructed at a cost of $82 million and was completed in 1993. The prison was constructed on the site of a farm. The campus covers 63 acres (25 ha), inside and outside the perimeter fence.

== Notable Inmates ==
Inmate Name	Register Number	Status	Details
Eric Frein	MY0275	Sentenced to death.	Perpetrator of the 2014 Pennsylvania State Police barracks attack in which he murdered Bryon Dickson and injured another officer. After a large state-wide manhunt, Frein was captured and tried for his crimes.
John Eichinger	GL3402	Sentenced to death.	Convicted of murdering 4 people.
James David Martin	GN0771	Serving a sentence of 22-to-44 years.	Murdered 3 people between 1989-2005.
Richard Andrew Poplawski	KB7354	Sentenced to death.	Perpetrator of the 2009 shooting of Pittsburgh police officers in which he murdered three police officers after a 9-1-1 call from his mother's home.
Raghunandan Yandamuri	LU3857	Sentenced to death.	Convicted of the kidnapping-murder of Saanvi Venna and murdering Satyavathi Venna.

== See also ==
- List of Pennsylvania state prisons
- Capital punishment in Pennsylvania
