= James David Martin =

American serial killer

- Martin 2024 Mugshot
- Born: December 11, 1971 (age 54); The Bronx, New York, U.S.
- Other name: "Snake"
- Convictions: Pennsylvania; Third degree murder New York; First degree manslaughter Attempted robbery Federal; Voluntary manslaughter (18 U.S.C. § 1112)
- Penalty: Pennsylvania; 22-44 years imprisonment New York; 5 years (robbery); 20 years imprisonment (manslaughter); Federal; 7 years imprisonment

Details
- Victims: 3
- Span of crimes: 1989–2005
- Country: United States
- States: Maryland, New York, Pennsylvania
- Date apprehended: For the last time in 2005
- Imprisoned at: State Correctional Institution – Somerset, Somerset, Pennsylvania

James David Martin (born December 11, 1971) is an American serial killer who strangled three people across three states between 1989 and 2005. While serving a sentence for the murder of his wife in Pennsylvania, he was connected via DNA profiling to a cold case murder in The Bronx, for which he was later given an additional 20 years imprisonment.

== Early life ==
Little is known about Martin's early life. According to the detectives who interviewed him, when he was about six years old, his mother beat his little sister to death. Following this event, James was sent to live in Fort Meade, Maryland, with his grandmother and sister and brother where he attended Meade Senior High School. While a student there, he was on the basketball team, where he got acquainted with 15-year-old Michael Eugene Thomas, who would become his best friend and later become his first victim.

== Murders ==
At age 17, Martin was envious that his fellow basketball buddy Thomas had recently bought himself an expensive pair of Air Jordans worth $115.50. On May 2, 1989, James lured Michael into the woods near the school, where he proceeded to sodomize and then strangle him to death. After killing him, he stole the Air Jordans and fled the scene. Not long after, however, he was arrested for the murder. Martin was tried in federal court since the crime occurred on federal property. Martin pleaded guilty to voluntary manslaughter in federal court and was sentenced to seven years in prison. The senseless crime for the shoes, which ironically did not even fit Martin, were featured on the cover of Sports Illustrated, with professional basketball player Michael Jordan himself expressing his horror at the brutality of the crime. Martin was released in 1996 and moving back to New York City to live with his mother.

On February 23, 1998, while walking around the Bronx, Martin came across 14-year-old Marleny Cruz, a Dominican-born adoptee who often went on visits to an aunt in the area. Taking an interest in the beautiful young girl, James asked her out on a date to his mother's apartment, to which she agreed. At some point, however, the pair began arguing, with Martin proceeding to grab her by the throat, beating, sexually abusing and finally, strangling Cruz to death. He then dumped her body on a curb in University Heights, where she was later found by passers-by. Initially, she could not be identified, and it was even presumed that she could have been Chante Smalls, a girl who had recently gone missing, but it was later determined not to be the case, as Smalls was later found alive. Eight months later, through dental records, the body was identified as that of Cruz, but her killer remained elusive. Some detectives theorized that her death might have been related to a series of rapes that occurred in the Bronx at the time, but no conclusive connection was made to any such case.

Five months after the Cruz murder, Martin was arrested for groping a woman struggling with substance abuse and for possession of crack cocaine. He was jailed for a year and then released. Not long after, he lured a 17-year-old male relative on a rooftop in the Bronx, where he attempted to strangle the boy with the laces from his sweatpants. The relative lapsed into unconsciousness, with Martin stabbing him in the neck with a knife, stealing $30 and then fleeing. Miraculously, the boy survived his injuries and managed to reach a hospital. When he was visited by his family, he pleaded with them not to let James in, as he was sure he would "finish [him] off." At that moment, James walked in, and although he was arrested on the spot, he was allowed to plead guilty to attempted robbery and sentenced to five years imprisonment.

While in prison, he communicated with 30-year-old Cicela Santiago, who would become his girlfriend and later, his wife. After his release, the couple moved to Allentown, Pennsylvania, where, three months later, he strangled Cicela to death after she threatened to leave him. Martin dumped her body in a parking lot trash bin near the mall, where she was soon found.

== Arrest, trial and imprisonment ==
Martin was swiftly arrested following the discovery of his wife's body, pleading guilty and receiving a sentence of 22-to-44 years imprisonment, which he would serve at the State Correctional Institution – Somerset prison. While serving his sentence there, his DNA was matched to that of an unidentified male's found underneath the fingernails of Marleny Cruz, and detectives from the Bronx were dispatched to question him. He freely admitted his guilt in the murder, and extradited back to New York City to stand trial on charges of murder, rape and sodomy. On October 28, 2016, James David Martin pleaded guilty to first degree manslaughter in her death, and received an additional 20 years imprisonment, to be served on top of his previous sentence.

== Bibliography ==
- Ronald M. Holmes and Stephen T. Holmes (June 23, 2010). Fatal Violence: Case Studies and Analysis of Emerging Forms. CRC Press. ISBN 9781439826881.
- Danielle Sarver Coombs and Bob Batchelor (2013). American History Through American Sports: From Colonial Lacrosse to Extreme Sports, Volume 1. ABC-CLIO. ISBN 9780313379888.
- David A. Aaker and Alexander L. Biel (October 31, 2013). Brand Equity & Advertising: Advertising's Role in Building Strong Brands. Psychology Press. ISBN 9781317759836.
- Nicholas Smith (May 1, 2018). Kicks: The Great American Story of Sneakers. Crown. ISBN 9780451498137.
- Michael Jacobson (March 11, 2019). Marketing Madness: A Survival Guide For A Consumer Society. Routledge. ISBN 9780429720260.
