= Assistance in Recovery =

Assistance in Recovery (AiR) is an international provider of addiction recovery assistance in Saint Paul, Minnesota that focuses on treating addiction as a chronic disease, and provides services to reflect this.

== Overview ==
AiR has behavioral health case management services for chronic disease care and specializes in the treatment of chemical dependency, mental health and eating disorders. AiR is an organization of professional intervention specialists, recovery and addiction licensed counselors and consultants who provide crisis management services through education, action and healing alongside their behavioral health management services and aftercare recovery assistance programs.

The implementation of case management improves outcomes for clients. This increase is a result of consistent support for the family or organization and ongoing advocacy with appropriate clinical support for the individual.

The company maintains offices in 15 cities within the United States, with a staff of board certified clinical psychologists, social workers, addiction counselors and therapists. The company also manages cases from outside the United States.

== History ==
Assistance in Recovery (AiR) follows in line with the philosophy and practice of Dr. Vernon Johnson, the creator of the Johnson Model of intervention, which stresses the need to break through the denial harbored by most who suffer from addiction. By confronting and promoting the positive outcomes of treatment while explaining the negative consequences of refusal, the individual becomes enabled to make an informed, active decision regarding his/her disease.

In the 1990s, Dr. Johnson's successor Dr. James Fearing began National Counseling Intervention Services (NCIS) in Minneapolis. His goal was to educate families about addiction and provide national intervention training. NCIS was one of the foremost intervention training sources until Dr. Fearing's death in 2002. Employed and trained by Dr. Fearing as an interventionist in the mid nineties, Andrew Wainwright created AiR with the same goal in 2002.

Wainwright's understanding of addiction recovery came not only from his experience working under Dr. Fearing, but also from his own personal recovery from heroin addiction in the mid-1990s. After his mother urged him to seek recovery while in a psychiatric ward in Washington D.C., Wainwright entered treatment at the nationally recognized Hazelden center in Center City, Minnesota. While in treatment, Wainwright met Robert Poznanovich and together began Addiction Intervention Resources, Incorporated. The company was the first to implement both Dr. Johnson's model of recovery and the Family Systems model. The AiR Model focuses on a fast initiation of care while also helping the family cope. In so doing, they increase the rates of recovery for those struggling to overcome addiction or behavioral health issues.

Following Poznanovich's departure from the company in 2009, Wainwright re-branded AiR, renaming it Assistance in Recovery and expanding the company.

AiR has provided consulting, intervention and recovery management services in all US states and around the world.

== See also ==
- Addiction Research Center
- Advocates for Opioid Recovery
