= John Eichinger =

American serial killer

- Mugshot of Eichinger on June 28, 2021
- Born: John Charles Eichinger; February 18, 1972 (age 54); Malvern, Pennsylvania, U.S.
- Status: In prison
- Motive: Romantic rejection
- Convictions: First degree murder (4 counts); Possession of an instrument of crime (2 counts); Unsworn falsification to authorities (3 counts)
- Penalty: Death

Details
- Victims: 4
- Span of crimes: 1999–2005
- Country: United States
- State: Pennsylvania
- Date apprehended: March 25, 2005; 21 years ago
- Imprisoned at: State Correctional Institution – Phoenix, Skippack Township, Pennsylvania

John Charles Eichinger (born February 18, 1972) is an American serial killer who was convicted of killing three women and one child from 1999 to 2005 in Pennsylvania, United States, crimes he committed after two of the victims had rejected his romantic advances. He was handed three death sentences for the later murders and one life sentence for the first and is currently awaiting execution.

== Early life ==
John Charles Eichinger was born on February 18, 1972, in Malvern, Pennsylvania, as one of four brothers. He attended the Upper Merion Area High School in King of Prussia, where he was part of a large group of friends who would play Dungeons & Dragons in their spare time. Through this activity, he became acquainted with Jennifer Still and Heather Greaves, developing a romantic interest in both women. After graduation, he found work as a clerk at a local Acme supermarket, where he worked alongside Heather Greaves. He was noted for playing in local chess tournaments in his spare time.

== Murders ==
On July 6, 1999, Eichinger, donning a pair of rubber gloves and carrying a large knife under his jacket, went to Jennifer Still's home in Bridgeport to confess his feelings towards her. To his dismay, she rejected his advances, stating that she would not leave her fiancé. Enraged by her rejection, Eichinger pulled out the knife and repeatedly stabbed her, ultimately cutting her throat before leaving the house. In the subsequent investigations, police questioned Still's boyfriend and friends, including Eichinger, who claimed that he had been in New Jersey at the time of the murders. In an attempt to ward the police off his trail, he claimed that two other Dungeons & Dragons players might have information about the murder, with one being heavily involved in Wicca. As the investigators had no evidence to connect him with the murder at the time, they focused on the players mentioned by Eichinger, until a DNA swab proved that they were innocent.

After the murder, Eichinger stored the bloodied knife, clothing, and rubber gloves he had worn on the day of the murder in his room as a keepsake to remind him of the killing. For the next five years, when Halloween came about, he would take out the knife and don a mask of Ghostface from the horror franchise Scream, and would go out trick-or-treating with them. Around 2003, he moved to his parents' new home in Somers Point, New Jersey, where he transferred to work at a local Acme supermarket.

On March 25, 2005, Heather Greaves ordered some purple flowers for her upcoming birthday and arranged for Eichinger to deliver them at her home in King of Prussia. Bringing the knife and rubber gloves with him, Eichinger went to the house and confessed his feelings for Greaves. After being rejected again, he pulled out the knife and started stabbing her before finishing her off by slitting her throat. The act was noticed by Greaves' 21-year-old sister Lisa and 3-year-old daughter, Avery, who were in at the house at the time. Unwilling to leave any witnesses, Eichinger went to the bathroom and stabbed Lisa to death before catching up to Avery in the hallway and killing her. He then started walking back to his car, where a neighbor of Greaves' observed him with bloodied clothes and a rag tied around his hand. The Greaves' father discovered the victims' bodies when he returned home from work.

== Arrest, trial, and imprisonment ==
As the killings heavily resembled Jennifer Still's murder years prior, authorities looked into whether the four victims had any connections. After learning that Jennifer Still and Heather Greaves had been mutual friends with each other and with Eichinger, Detective Richard Nilsen was dispatched to interrogate him at his workplace in Somers Point.

Eichinger agreed to be interviewed, initially making false statements about his whereabouts and denying any involvement. However, when he noticed that Nilsen was carrying a gun on him, Eichinger confessed to the Greaves murders, bizarrely stating that he followed company policy to "never resist a man with a gun." Eichinger then also confessed to the murder of Jennifer Still in 1999, telling Nilsen that he had used the same knife to kill her after she rejected him.

The next morning, Eichinger waived his right to an extradition hearing and was extradited to Pennsylvania, where he was charged with four counts of capital murder.

In October 2005, Eichinger waived his rights to jury trial and opted for a bench trial. He did not contest the charges against him and was found guilty.

In November 2005, he confessed to the four murders before the judge, arguing that he should be given a life sentence in light of mitigating evidence presented by his lawyers: these included claims that he suffered from schizoid personality disorder and that he was under extreme emotional distress when he committed the crimes, relating to the recent death of his father from Alzheimer's disease. These claims were contested by the prosecutors, who pointed that the defendant had no prior history of mental illness, had planned his crimes in advance and the murders of Lisa and Avery were done to get rid of witnesses.

On December 12, 2005 he was found guilty on all counts and was given three death sentences for the murders of the Greaves family; he was given a life term for the murder of Jennifer Still. At the penalty phase phase, the Greaves' mother stated that she hoped that she would live long enough to see Eichinger executed for the murders. Since his incarceration, he has attempted to appeal his sentence on multiple occasions. Still, each time, his appeals have been denied. In 2008, Eichinger's death warrant was signed by Governor Ed Rendell.

A notice of execution was signed on January 9, 2023, by the Pennsylvania Department of Corrections Acting Secretary George Little. The notice set March 7, 2023, as Eichinger's execution date, but it was not carried out, as a result of Pennsylvania Governor Josh Shapiro's announcement of a moratorium on executions on February 16, 2023.

== In the media and culture ==
Eichinger's crimes were covered in two separate crime documentary series, both aired on Investigation Discovery: Homicide City as an episode titled Deadly Circle of Friends and In Ice Cold Blood as an episode titled Dungeons, Dragons and Death.

== See also ==
- Capital punishment in Pennsylvania
- List of death row inmates in the United States § Pennsylvania
- List of serial killers in the United States
- Femicide
