= Danilo Cavalcante =

Brazilian murderer and formerly escaped convict (born 1989)

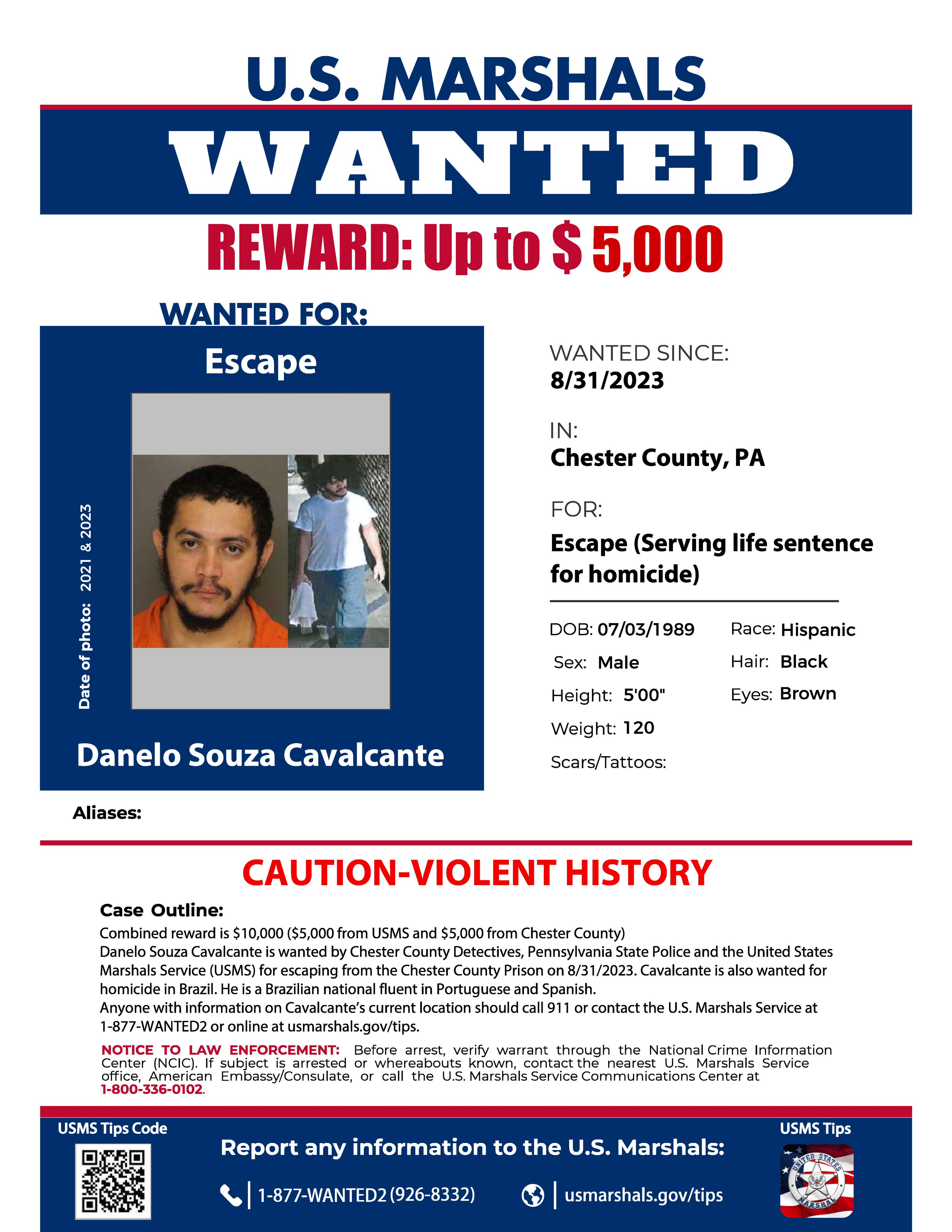
- Cavalcante's 'Wanted' poster for the United States Marshals Service
- Born: Danilo Souza Cavalcante; July 3, 1989 (age 37); Estreito, Maranhão, Brazil
- Other name: Danelo Souza Cavalcante (incorrectly referred)
- Known for: Escape from Chester County Prison
- Conviction: First-degree murder
- Penalty: Life imprisonment without the possibility of parole
- Capture status: In custody at SCI Greene
- Escaped: August 31 – September 13, 2023 (2 weeks)

Details
- Victims: Deborah Brandão; Valter Júnior Moreira dos Reis (suspected)

Danilo Souza Cavalcante (Note: Also incorrectly referred to as Danelo Cavalcante in court records and by media outlets.) (Brazilian Portuguese pronunciation: [dɐˈnilu ˈsowzɐ kavawˈkɐ̃tʃi]; born July 3, 1989) is a Brazilian national accused of murder in the Brazilian state of Tocantins and a convicted murderer in the U.S. state of Pennsylvania. After originally being wanted by Brazilian authorities for his alleged role in the shooting death of Valter Júnior Moreira dos Reis in 2017, Cavalcante fled to the United States. Four years later, in April 2021, Cavalcante was arrested for fatally stabbing his ex-girlfriend, Deborah Brandão.

On August 31, 2023, just days after being convicted and sentenced to life in prison for the murder of his ex-girlfriend, Cavalcante escaped from Chester County Prison, triggering a manhunt by police that would last 14 days and span across the Chester County area before his capture on September 13, 2023. The manhunt would receive significant media attention in both the United States and Brazil.

== Early life ==
Cavalcante was born on July 3, 1989, in the Brazilian state of Maranhão. Little is known about his early life, but Cavalcante ran into multiple legal issues in Brazil throughout his youth.

== Alleged 2017 murder of Valter Júnior Moreira dos Reis ==
In November 2017, Cavalcante was accused of fatally shooting 20-year-old student Valter Júnior Moreira dos Reis five times on November 5 outside of a restaurant in the city of Figueirópolis, Tocantins, Brazil. Investigations indicated that they were friends, and the murder allegedly occurred due to a vehicle-repair debt that dos Reis owed him. One week after the crime, the Brazilian justice system accepted a request for preventive detention made by the Public Prosecutor's Office, issuing a warrant for him. Cavalcante, in turn, became a fugitive and hid in a wooded area to prevent his arrest.

== Escape to the United States ==
In January 2018, Cavalcante fled Brazil and illegally entered the United States via Puerto Rico. Although there was an arrest warrant against him, Cavalcante was able to leave the country through Brasília International Airport due to miscommunication on the part of the Tocantins justice system, which had not requested the registration of the decision in the National Warrant Registry until seven months after the crime (i.e., in June 2018). After entering Puerto Rico, Cavalcante obtained a fake ID and eventually settled in Chester County, Pennsylvania, where his sister and friends were already living.

== 2021 murder of Deborah Brandão ==
While living in Chester County, Cavalcante began a relationship with Deborah Brandão, also a Brazilian. According to investigations, Brandão ended her relationship with Cavalcante, which angered him. He then began threatening Brandão soon thereafter in 2020. On April 18, 2021, Deborah was in front of her house in Schuylkill Township with her 7-year-old daughter and 4-year-old son, when Cavalcante attacked her and stabbed her 38 times. Brandão's daughter then ran to a neighbor's house to alert them and call 911. Brandão was taken to Paoli Hospital, but would ultimately succumb to her injuries. Meanwhile, Cavalcante fled Pennsylvania to avoid arrest and was on the run for several hours until he was found and arrested by Virginia State Police in Prince William County, Virginia. Cavalcante was then extradited back to Pennsylvania.

Cavalcante's trial began on August 16, 2023, in Chester County, where a jury took just 15 minutes to reach a guilty verdict. Cavalcante was sentenced to life in prison without the possibility of parole on August 22.

== 2023 prison escape ==
Following his conviction and sentencing, Cavalcante was sent to Chester County Prison in Pocopson Township, where he would await transfer to a state correctional institution. One week after sentencing, at around 9 a.m. on August 31, 2023, he escaped from Chester County Prison by chimneying (incorrectly called "crab walking" by media outlets) between two close walls in the exercise yard of the prison, making his way up to the roof and maneuvering around the razor wire fencing to escape the prison.

A similar escape occurred at Chester County Prison just months earlier, when inmate Igor Bolte scaled the wall and escaped the prison, though he was apprehended within five minutes of his escape. Investigations that followed found that Cavalcante had used the same method as Bolte.

=== Manhunt ===
Once Cavalcante was confirmed to be missing, the prison was put on lockdown, and a manhunt ensued. Around an hour after his escape, he was spotted walking on a road around two miles west of the prison. Police would search this area, with multiple tips and potential sightings being reported by residents, with one homeowner claiming Cavalcante was in his house and even stole food. During the early morning of September 2, Cavalcante was spotted on a residential security camera crossing through the backyard of a home around 1.5 miles south of the prison. Police created a search perimeter around the area, securing roads and railroads that traveled through the area to prevent Cavalcante from potentially fleeing, and placed a $10,000 reward for any information leading to his capture.

By September 4, the search party had intensified in manpower, and helicopters flying over the search area began playing a recorded message of Cavalcante's mother, speaking in Portuguese, pleading Cavalcante to peacefully surrender to authorities. The next morning, Cavalcante was spotted on a trail camera on the property of Longwood Gardens, located about two miles south of the prison. Police moved to set up a new perimeter centered around the property, and Longwood Gardens, along with schools in close proximity to the search area, would close while the search took place.

Police continued an intense search of the property for the rest of the week, and Longwood Gardens briefly reopened for limited-access until it was forced to evacuate and close again after another sighting on the property on September 7. On that same day, police upped the reward for information leading to his capture from $10,000 to $20,000.

Pennsylvania State Police Lieutenant Colonel George Bivens, who led both the manhunt for Cavalcante and was a key figure in the 2014 manhunt for fugitive Eric Frein, said on September 8 that there were over 400 local, state, and federal agents searching for Cavalcante in the perimeter. Authorities involved included the U.S. Marshals Service, the FBI, and the DEA.

The intense search continued until a major development took place on September 9, when Cavalcante appeared to have broken through the search perimeter at Longwood Gardens when he was spotted on a Ring video doorbell standing on the porch of a former co-worker's house in East Pikeland Township, near Phoenixville, nearly 20 miles northeast of the search perimeter. Cavalcante appeared to have shaven and was wearing a new set of clothes. Police found that Cavalcante stole a van owned by a local dairy store near Longwood Gardens and drove it to the Phoenixville area.

On the morning of September 10, at approximately 10:40 a.m., Cavalcante's stolen van was discovered abandoned and out of fuel in a field in East Nantmeal Township. The search perimeter shifted to another new location, this time in the area of the stolen van. That same day, Cavalcante's sister, Eleni Cavalcante, was arrested by ICE officials for "immigration issues".

On September 11, as the search continued, Cavalcante was placed on the Interpol red list, and authorities upped the reward for information on Cavalcante's whereabouts from $20,000 to $25,000. That night, Cavalcante was sighted again, and a 911 call reported a shooting near an elementary school in South Coventry Township. Police found that Cavalcante broke into the garage of a home in the area. The homeowner discovered Cavalcante in his home and reportedly shot at him seven times, but Cavalcante was able to escape the house and steal a .22 rifle with a scope and a flashlight from the home. Police then discovered Cavalcante's sweatshirt and shoes in close proximity to the home. Once Cavalcante was confirmed to be armed, police urged residents in the area of South Coventry Township to lock all doors, windows and vehicles, and to shelter-in-place. All schools in the Owen J. Roberts School District would close for the next day.

Police created a new search perimeter in South Coventry Township that was tighter than previous ones, as they were confident they now had Cavalcante surrounded. The search continued throughout the day on September 12. At around 1:00 a.m. on September 13, a DEA plane with thermal imaging technology spotted Cavalcante in the woods. Despite the sighting, police were forced to wait until sunrise to approach because of inclement weather that hindered the surveillance plane from safely operating.

=== Capture ===
At around 8:00 a.m. on the morning of September 13, police discovered Cavalcante sleeping with the rifle he had stolen from a home two nights prior. Cavalcante attempted to flee by crawling in the thick underbrush, but a U.S. Customs and Border Patrol police-trained Belgian Malinois named Yoda subdued Cavalcante by biting him on the head and holding onto him until police arrived. Lt. Col. George Bivens said at a press conference Yoda caused minor injuries to Cavalcante's scalp during his capture.

Following his capture, a SWAT team transported Cavalcante to the Pennsylvania State Police barracks in Avondale, where they interviewed him before transferring him to State Correctional Institution – Phoenix in Montgomery County, Pennsylvania, where he was held until November 2023, when he was transferred to State Correctional Institution - Greene, where he is currently incarcerated.

=== Aftermath ===
Following Cavalcante's capture, local and state officials, including Pennsylvania Governor Josh Shapiro, expressed gratitude towards the many law enforcement officers that assisted in the search for Cavalcante. Chester County District Attorney Deb Ryan declared: "Today is a great day here in Chester County...Our nightmare is finally over, and the good guys won. We owe a debt of gratitude to all of the first responders for their tireless and dedicated efforts in bringing this fugitive to justice. They worked around the clock, and we are deeply grateful to all of them."

Lt. Col. George Bivens, who led the manhunt, discussed the various challenges that law enforcement officers had to overcome to find Cavalcante, noting a heat wave and severe thunderstorms that took place in the area during the manhunt, along with the fact that each of the search perimeters created during the manhunt were in heavily wooded areas.

Cavalcante was interviewed by police just after his capture, where he revealed that he survived on watermelon and creek water, only traveled at night, and even was almost stepped on by a police officer at one point while hiding. Cavalcante had planned to steal a car and either drive to Canada or get to Puerto Rico. After he was returned to prison, Cavalcante was charged with 20 offences related to crimes committed during his escape and time on the run, including felony burglary, criminal trespass and theft. In August 2024, he pleaded guilty and was sentenced to 15 to 30 years in prison.

Following Cavalcante's escape, the Chester County Prison Board, which oversees the Chester County Prison, received sharp criticism from residents of the area for failing to prevent Cavalcante's escape. Residents noted that the prison had the opportunity to make the appropriate security upgrades needed after the May 19 attempted escape of Igor Bolte, and that these upgrades could have potentially prevented Cavalcante from escaping, as he used the same method Bolte used to escape. The prison had already fired the prison guard who was on-duty during Cavalcante's escape on September 7, with the prison claiming that the guard had the opportunity to spot Cavalcante as he was escaping. Days after Cavalcante's capture, Chester County Prison announced they had installed a metal roof over the area where Cavalcante shimmied up two walls to access the roof and escape, along with other various security measures and upgrades being put in place.
