= 2000 Wilkinsburg shooting =

Mass shooting in Pennsylvania, U.S.

- Wilkinsburg highlighted in a map of Allegheny County
- Location: 40.4456°N 79.8833°W; Allegheny County, Pennsylvania, U.S.
- Date: March 1, 2000 c. 11:15 a.m. – 2:15 p.m. (ET)
- Target: White people
- Attack type: Spree shooting, hate crime, mass shooting
- Weapon: .22 caliber revolver
- Deaths: 3
- Injuries: 2
- Perpetrator: Ronald Taylor
- Motive: Anti-White racism; Perceived medical mistreatment; Mental illness

On March 1, 2000, an anti-white shooting spree hate crime occurred in Wilkinsburg, Pennsylvania, when 39-year-old Ronald Taylor, a black man, shot and killed three white men and wounded two others within an eight block radius, primarily at local Burger King and McDonald's restaurants. Hours later, Taylor surrendered to police and was tried, convicted, and sentenced to death the following year. He was incarcerated at SCI Phoenix in eastern Pennsylvania until his death in 2024.

== Details ==
=== Shooting begins ===
At about 9 a.m. on March 1, 2000, two maintenance workers, John Dewitt and 55-year-old John Kroll, arrived at the apartment of 39-year-old Ronald Taylor to replace Taylor's door. When Taylor answered the door, he began taunting both with insults about them being white, according to Dewitt, who claimed Taylor said "You white, racist, pig". Nevertheless, the two began work. At around 10:30 a.m., after removing the old door, Dewitt and Kroll started installing the new door, while Taylor continued harassing them. Eventually, Dewitt told Taylor, "Why don't you just shut up." Taylor responded to Dewitt, "You're dead." As the job was almost done, a woman downstairs from Taylor called upstairs and asked if one of the maintenance workers could come and help her with a locked bedroom door. Dewitt said he could and walked downstairs, while Kroll finished the job. Kroll then went downstairs to meet a coworker named Andrew Williams.

At just about 11:15 a.m, Taylor grabbed his .22 caliber revolver and set his apartment couch on fire. Armed with the gun, he confronted Kroll and Williams downstairs and reportedly told them "I don't like white people", then proceeded to shoot Kroll in the neck. Williams rushed to Kroll's side while Taylor decided not to shoot Williams, likely because Williams was black, but instead demanded to know where Dewitt was. Dewitt, who was in the parking lot putting tools away, walked back into the building to get Kroll when he noticed Taylor with a gun, so he took cover. Minutes later, he saw Williams covered in blood walking with Kroll in his arms, and as Taylor was not in sight, he rushed over to Williams and asked what was going on.

Williams told Dewitt that Taylor shot Kroll and was looking for him. The two then put Kroll in the back of the employee pickup truck and drove to the Western Pennsylvania Hospital. Police and firefighters were contacted and rushed to Taylor's apartment, but by that time, Taylor had fled. About five minutes later Taylor walked two blocks to Burger King at Penn and Pitt avenues, where he fatally shot 71-year-old Joseph Healy, a former PNC Bank employee and priest. Shortly afterwards, Taylor approached a McDonald's, and shot multiple times at the van belonging to 56-year-old Richard Clinger as he waited in the drive-through. Some shots hit Clinger, and his stepdaughter Cindy Zambo ran to a nearby Dunkin' Donuts where she alerted people there about her dad being shot. Meanwhile, Taylor entered the McDonald's and shot the manager, 25-year-old Steven Bostard. At one point during his rampage witnesses told police that Taylor told a black woman; “Not you sister.” Taylor then returned to the parking lot and shot 20-year-old Emil Sanielevici, who was waiting to pick up food. Sanielevici later died, while Clinger and Bostard survived after being treated at the UPMC. At 11:51 a.m., Kroll, who was awaiting surgery, died from his bullet wound.

=== Shooting ends ===
At around 12:00 p.m., police cornered Taylor at a residential building, where Taylor took refuge in an empty room. Sgt. John Fisher began communicating with Taylor and begged him to surrender. Taylor told the officer that he was going to commit suicide because he did not want his mother to see him in jail. After two hours, Fisher was able to convince Taylor to surrender, and at around 2:15 p.m., Taylor handed over his gun and was arrested.

== Victims ==
=== Killed ===
- Emil Sanielevici, 20.
- John Raymond Kroll, 55.
- Joseph Aloysius Healy, 71.

=== Injured ===
- Steven Bostard, 25.
- Richard Clinger, 56. Richard Clinger would suffer permanent brain damage and was paralyzed on his right side as a result of his wounding.

== Perpetrator ==
Ronald Taylor (September 30, 1960 – April 2, 2024), the shooter, had no prior criminal record. Taylor grew up in the predominantly African-American Hill District of Pittsburgh, Pennsylvania. When he was young, he was diagnosed with asthma. He attended Fifth Avenue High School until it closed in 1976; afterwards he attended Letsche Education Center until dropping out. At the time of the shooting spree, Taylor lived in the Woodside Garden Apartments and was unemployed, living on Supplemental Security Income and food stamp benefits which totaled between $600 and $700 a month.

Authorities said a search of Taylor's apartment revealed "anti-white" writings. There were other statements including "big thumbs up to Hitler". Taylor had written a suicide note which investigators found after the shooting. The note read as follows;

"I'm sorry, mother, for taking my own life with your gun that I sneaked for the second time in two years. Try to understand when a person is physically suffering for a long time and I'm treated by racist, biased doctors and nurses who so often give me generic, cheap medication that is ineffective [and] causes return visits to emergency rooms [that] frustration so often sets in. I get fed up with doctors treating black patients differently from whites in terms of unfairness, unequally and like dirt. Jesus Christ made a very costly mistake putting white people on the face of the earth. I'll see all of my enemies in hell. Ha, ha, ha, ha, ha."

Friends of Taylor reported that they were stunned to hear that Taylor had committed the shootings. David Ellis, an acquaintance of Taylor, said that Taylor "never caused any trouble I knew of". They also reported to be shocked about the accusations of Taylor being racist. Neighbors of Taylor described him as "quiet" and someone who "didn't start any trouble". Taylor rarely met with his family members and spent a large amount of time in isolation. Taylor did have a history of mental illness and one professional, Dr. Horacio Fabrega, who would testify for Taylor's defense, described Taylor as "delusional". Fabrega also said that Taylor had once burned an image of Jesus Christ under the belief that God "turned bad". Taylor had stolen the revolver he used in the shootings from his mother, who had purchased it in 1982.

== Reactions ==
In the wake of the shooting, President Bill Clinton responded by expressing sorrow for the victims' families, stating, "We owe the families of the victims, the communities, our prayers and the best wishes". President Clinton also used the case as an example as to why stricter gun laws should be implemented; "We don't know all the facts yet, but it was a bad situation.... These incidents, particularly the one yesterday in Michigan, call on us to recognize the fact that we simply haven't done everything we can do to keep guns away from criminals and children". Pennsylvania governor Tom Ridge said he "expressed sorrow at the horror in Wilkinsburg. Our thoughts and prayers are with the victims, their families and the entire Wilkinsburg community". Wilkinsburg mayor Wilbert Young held multiple vigils the night after the shooting to honor the victims.

== Legal proceedings ==
In April 2000, Allegheny County Judge Jeffrey A. Manning ruled Taylor incompetent to stand trial, despite a psychiatrist's ruling that he was. The prosecuting attorneys argued for another psychiatric examination after one hired by Taylor's defense in June claimed he suffered from schizophrenia. Following another evaluation by Dr. Michael Welner, Taylor was ruled competent, and in September prosecutors announced that they were seeking the death penalty.

In April 2001, Taylor was transferred to the Allegheny County Jail in downtown Pittsburgh to await trial, which began on November 1. Taylor pleaded not guilty by reason of insanity, citing years of mental illness. Prosecutors argued that Taylor was not as mentally unwell as he let on and was diverting blame away from himself. Dr. Horacio Fabrega argued that on the day of the shooting Taylor had been under large amount of stress, including worries that the lease at his apartment would not be renewed. Fabrega also testified that Taylor believed there was a conspiracy against blacks and other minorities. Combined, Fabrega said this created a "psychotic storm". Fabrega, however, did acknowledge that Taylor was aware of the severity of his actions, but claimed that Taylor believed they were the right things to do under his imagined circumstances.

On November 8, Taylor was convicted on 46 criminal charges; three counts of first-degree murder, nine counts of aggravated assault, four counts of terroristic threats, two counts of unlawful restraint, four counts of simple assault, 16 counts of reckless endangerment, one count of arson, one count of catastrophe, one count of risking a catastrophe, one count of carrying a gun without a license, and for perpetrating a hate crime. Jurors were then left to decide whether Taylor should be sentenced to death or to life in prison.

In an attempt to sway the jury away from imposing the death penalty, the defense brought in Taylor's family to testify on his behalf. Taylor's brother Charles testified under oath that their father abused and threatened young Ronald. Charles stated the emotional trauma stayed with Ronald growing up. Their mother Shirly testified that "Ron is not a racist. I did not raise my children to hate white people". Instead she stated her son suffered in social situations, rather spending his time confined and that the "noise got to him". Two jurors were reportedly overheard crying during the testimony. Taylor's defense argued multiple factors that weighed against the death penalty, including his lack of a criminal record and previous mental health issues. After two days of deliberating, the jury unanimously came to the decision to sentence Taylor to death. He showed no emotion as the verdict was read. Taylor was formally sentenced to death on January 11, 2002. Judge Lawrence O'Toole rejected requests from Taylor's attorneys that he overturn the jury's verdict due to speculation Taylor was mentally ill.

== Aftermath ==
A month after Taylor's killing spree, a white man named Richard Baumhammers shot to death five minorities in a racially motivated shooting spree in Pittsburgh, Pennsylvania. Due to the close proximity, timing, and overall similarities media outlets compared Taylor and Baumhammers during multiple news reports. Related to the Baumhammers case, Baumhammers' father, who opposed the death penalty, attended Taylor's trial.

In 2005, the Pennsylvania Supreme Court upheld Taylor's death sentence and rejected a new trial. In January 2006, Pennsylvania Governor Ed Rendell signed a death warrant ordering Taylor to be executed on February 28 of that year via lethal injection. For unknown reasons, the execution was halted.

Taylor was incarcerated at State Correctional Institution – Phoenix. On April 2, 2024, he died of natural causes at age 63. Kroll's widow was ecstatic and relieved upon hearing the news but added that Taylor's death ultimately did not change anything.

== See also ==
- Richard Baumhammers
- 2009 Collier Township shooting
- 1969 Pennsylvania Turnpike shootings
