= Anthony Joyner =

American serial killer

- Joyner in 2026
- Born: May 26, 1962 (age 64); Philadelphia, Pennsylvania, U.S.
- Convictions: First degree murder (5 counts); Second degree murder Rape (6 counts); Burglary
- Penalty: Life imprisonment

Details
- Victims: 6–18
- Span of crimes: January – July 1983
- Country: United States
- State: Pennsylvania
- Date apprehended: August 1, 1983
- Imprisoned at: State Correctional Institution – Phoenix, Skippack Township, Pennsylvania

Anthony Joyner (born May 26, 1962) is an American serial killer and rapist who raped and murdered at least six elderly women at a nursing home in Philadelphia, Pennsylvania from January to July 1983, but is suspected in 18 total deaths that occurred there. Tried and convicted only for his confirmed murders, he was sentenced to life imprisonment.

== Biography ==
Very little is known about Joyner's early life. Born on May 25, 1962, in Philadelphia, he was considered portly and physically weak as a teenager, but otherwise had no problems with communication and was not ostracized by his peers. Because of his physique, Joyner had little success with women and was not popular in the neighborhood, with some friends and acquaintances suspecting him of being homosexual, which he vehemently denied.

As he failed to receive higher education, Joyner resorted to doing low-skilled labor and made a living off odd jobs. In October 1981, he got a position as an assistant nutritionist in the kitchen of the Philadelphia's Kearsley Home, Christ Church Hospital, at the time the oldest operating institution of its kind in the country. While working there, Joyner was regarded well by both staff and patients, who all said that he had a friendly, talkative, and energetic demeanor, and showed great affection for the elderly patients.

== Murders ==
As victims, Joyner would choose elderly female residents of the nursing home, aged between 83 and 92. On January 12, 1983, 92-year-old Margaret Eckard was found dead, and despite finding traces of blood around her nose, mouth, and genitals, the hospital staff concluded that she had died of natural causes. A month later, on February 12, 85-year-old Kathryn Maxwell's body was found in similar circumstances, followed by 86-year-old Elizabeth Monroe only a few days later. While examining the latter's body, medical personnel again found traces of blood and damage to her genitalia, but due to her advanced age and negligence on part of the staff, no autopsy was performed and the cause of death was ruled as a heart attack.

On June 1, the body of 89-year-old Lily Amlie was discovered by nursing home workers. It also showed the same signs as the previous deaths, but because Amlie had heart issues, her death was not considered suspicious. On July 19, two women, 90-year-old Eugenia Borda and 83-year-old Mildred Alston were found dead. While examining Borda's body, the doctors found traces of blood and injuries on her thighs and genitals. Finding these injuries highly suspicious, he refused to declare the cause of death as natural and insisted that he performed an autopsy on both bodies, which revealed that both women had been raped, with Borda being strangled and Alston suffocated to death. He reported his findings to the police, who immediately started an investigation into the matter.

== Аrrest ==
Because the facility had its own security staff, the police had already developed a theory early on that an unauthorized person could not have entered the nursing home unnoticed, and that the killer was likely among the personnel. While interviewing staff members, investigators determined that on July 19, the day Borda and Alston were murdered, Joyner had been seen in the facility's cellar early in the morning. Further investigation into his activities determined that he went inside the patients' rooms through the basement, and after raping and killing them, he would leave the area by the same route and return to work.

On August 1, Joyner was apprehended by law enforcement, and in a subsequent interrogation, he unexpectedly confessed to killing both women and was subsequently charged with both murders. According to investigators, Joyner expressed remorse and claimed that he wanted to make a full confession because he had trouble sleeping, while his attorney claimed that he was mentally ill and that the police had tricked his client into signing a pre-written confession. Because a total of 18 suspicious deaths had occurred at the nursing home since Joyner was hired in October 1981, police began investigating him for possible involvement in other killings.

During the investigation, police obtained a warrant to exhume the bodies of Eckard, Maxwell, Amlie, and Monroe. Autopsies were conducted on all four, with the rulings being that Maxwell and Monroe had been raped and strangled and that Amlie had been drowned in her bathtub. As Eckard's body was too decomposed, the coroners were unable to determine her cause of death. After learning of the autopsy results, Joyner confessed to the four murders, as well as a sexual assault committed on a 69-year-old woman on a Philadelphia street in July 1982, which the victim survived. The rape victim was found soon after and positively identified Joyner as her rapist, verifying his account. According to Joyner himself, it was this incident that provoked him to commit further crimes against older women, as they were unable to offer serious resistance.

When pressed for a motive, Joyner gave contradictory information: he insisted that due to certain reasons and circumstances he had no sex life, leaving him sexually frustrated. And as he was unable to be intimate with girls his age, he was left in a state of anger that led to him raping and strangling the patients at the nursing home - he claimed to kill them only because they knew him well and could get him imprisoned. Joyner's ex-girlfriend, who briefly had an intimate relationship with him, told police that he began to suffer from an inferiority complex after breaking up with her, growing increasingly worried about being labelled as gay, which prompted him to demonstrate his masculine behavior in every way possible. According to her testimony, Joyner wanted attention, as she claimed that a few days before his arrest, he had contacted her, claiming that he would soon become famous and be written about in the media.

While he was awaiting trial, eight of the officers involved in Joyner's arrest were honored by the Pennsylvania House of Representatives for their efforts to catch the killer.

== Trial ==
Joyner's trial began in April 1984 and lasted three weeks. During the proceedings, he confirmed his initial testimony and described details of the murders to jurors, but later retracted his confession, claiming that the investigators had pressured him into confessing.

Ultimately, Joyner was found guilty by jury verdict on five counts of first-degree murder and one count of second-degree murder, as well as six counts of rape and one count of burglary. As they were unable to reach a unanimous decision on whether he deserved to be sentenced to death, the court imposed a life sentence on him on May 6, 1984. While his sentence was read out, Joyner remained calm and emotionless.

As of March 2025, Joyner is still alive and serving his prison sentence at the State Correctional Institution – Phoenix in Skippack Township.

== See also ==
- List of serial killers in the United States

== Bibliography ==
- Davis, Carol Anne (2011). Doctors Who Kill. OverDrive, Inc. ISBN 9780749010072.
