= AmericanMuscle =

- Type: Privately held company
- Industry: e-commerce (automotive aftermarket)
- Founded: 2003; 23 years ago
- Founders: Steve Voudouris and Andrew Voudouris
- Headquarters: Malvern, Pennsylvania, United States
- Key people: CEO, Steve Voudouris, Executive Marketing Director, Andrew Voudouris
- Products: auto parts and accessories
- Parent: Turn5 Inc.
- Website: www.americanmuscle.com

AmericanMuscle is an American online retailer of automotive parts and accessories for Ford Mustang and Ford F-150 (F-Series truck) model automobiles. Founded by Steve Voudouris, it is one of the flagship brands and websites of Turn5 Inc., a holding company that owns and operates a group of specialty after market parts companies.

== History ==
The AmericanMuscle brand began in 2003 when the company was operating from a home garage and was managed by two of its current executives—brothers Steve Voudouris and Andrew Voudouris.

The founding partners were awarded the Small Business Administration's Young Entrepreneur of the Year Award in 2009 for their success in building the company's forebear, Xoxide while still in high school.

In 2009, the company changed its name to Turn5 Inc, and sold the Xoxide website to gaming equipment manufacturer and distributor, eDimensional Inc.

By 2016, AmericanMuscle operated from the company's Malvern, Pennsylvania headquarters, which includes a 200,000 square foot warehouse, video room, training room and design area and is one of the largest suppliers of aftermarket Ford Mustang and Ford F-150 performance parts in North America.

== Philanthropy ==
=== AmericanMuscle Charity Mustang Show ===
AmericanMuscle is the host of the annual AmericanMuscle Mustang Show. Originating in 2008 as a customer appreciation day in the company's Malvern, Pennsylvania headquarters, the AmericanMuscle Mustang show has evolved into the largest one day all Mustang car show in the world.

Through the Mustang Car Show's fund-raising activities and efforts, AmericanMuscle has raised and donated more than $150,000 in cash to non-profit organizations.

At its 7th annual Car Show in 2015, The AmericanMuscle team rebuilt a 2000 V6 Mustang for a terminally ill 18-year-old named Jonathan to fulfill his 'Make-A-Wish' dream.

In 2017, the Turn5 team donated $126,751 to the 'Make-A-Wish' foundation.

Date	Mustangs in Show	Attendees	Amount Raised	Charitable Organization
September 3, 2017	2,000	8,000	$126,751	Make-A-Wish Foundation
August 15, 2015	3,000	10,000	$55,000	Make-A-Wish Foundation
August 16, 2014	2,600	9,200	$31,200.00	Special Olympics
August 11, 2013	1,400	5,000	$20,522	Alex's Lemonade Stand
August 12, 2012	1,200	4,000	$14,408.00	Cystic Fibrosis Foundation
August 14, 2011	600	2,000	$14,511.00	Wounded Warrior Project
September 11, 2010	524	1,700	$14,825.00	Homes for Troops
July 19, 2009	150	750	$9,365.00	Homes for Troops

=== AmericanMuscle Student Scholarship Program ===
In 2013 AmericanMuscle began offering four annual scholarships for $2,000 each to students in the US and Canada pursuing an automotive related field of study. AmericanMuscle has awarded 14 scholarships totaling $28,000 since the program's inception.

== Recognition ==
- Entrepreneur Magazine - Hot 500 Award: 2007
- Bizrate - Platinum Award for Customer Service Excellence: 2014, 2013, 2012, 2011
