= State Correctional Institution – Phoenix =

U.S. state prison

- Location in Pennsylvania Location in the United States
- Location: Skippack Township, Pennsylvania; 40°13′48″N 75°25′12″W
- Status: Operational
- Security class: Maximum
- Capacity: 3,830
- Opened: July 9, 2018
- Managed by: Pennsylvania Department of Corrections
- Website: www.cor.pa.gov/Facilities/StatePrisons/Pages/Phoenix.aspx

The State Correctional Institution – Phoenix (SCI Phoenix) is a state prison in Skippack Township, Montgomery County, Pennsylvania, with a Collegeville postal address, in the Philadelphia metropolitan area. Operated by Pennsylvania Department of Corrections, it was named after the phoenix bird.

It cost $400 million to build, making it the most expensive state prison to be constructed in Pennsylvania history. It has a capacity of 3,830 prisoners, and as of September 2018, its full time workforce numbered 1,200. Heery International designed the facility. It replaced SCI Graterford. Most prisoners are male, located in the East and West sub units, while it has a re-entry unit for female prisoners with a capacity of 192.

The female unit is not in the main prison perimeter. SCI Phoenix is one of two prisons that share Pennsylvania's death row. The Pennsylvania Department of Corrections anticipated that most of the prisoners would be from the area of Philadelphia, and currently SCI Phoenix is the state prison closest to Philadelphia.

== History ==
The SCI Phoenix buildings were built on the SCI Graterford land area, and the Phoenix and Graterford buildings are about 0.25 mi (0.40 km) apart, with SCI Phoenix fencing beginning about 1,100 feet east of SCI Graterford's fencing.

The first bidding for construction of this prison occurred in the decade of the 2000s. The prison, originally to open in November 2014, opened late since Walsh Heery Joint Venture, the construction company, and Hill International, a Philadelphia company representing the State of Pennsylvania, had a dispute over whether the prison was ready to open. As of July 2018, the prison's final cost was still not finalized.

On June 1, 2018, its dedication ceremony was held, and the prison began operations on July 9, 2018. The state began moving Graterford prisoners there on July 11, 2018, and Graterford ended operations on July 15. Graterford's employees now were employees of Phoenix. Some inmates disliked the move as they feared they would be sharing cells with other inmates, while at Graterford they had single cells.

The population of Graterford was to reduce to 2,588 inmates by June 2018, so that the transfer of inmates to Phoenix would not involve as many people, and Phoenix eventually opened, with 2,633 prisoners. Initially, prisoners with life sentences who had single cells at Graterford would continue to have single cells at Phoenix.

At some point all of the death penalty prisoners at SCI Greene were moved to SCI Phoenix. In 2024 the state began moving some death row prisoners to SCI Somerset.

== Composition ==
Many prisoners are two to a cell, and most cells have the dimensions 12 ft (3.7 m) by 6 ft (1.8 m). Phoenix has 3,422 beds.

It has inmates convicted of capital murder, many from the Philadelphia area and most of whom were sentenced to life imprisonment but with some under death sentences, housed in a dedicated section of the prison, called the "Capital Unit." That section is larger than the previous capital case section that was in Graterford.

The PADOC stated that the prison hoped to move inmates with death sentences from SCI Greene, where most death row and capital murder inmates in Pennsylvania resided, to SCI Phoenix so that the prison system can more easily transport them to court proceedings.

== Notable inmates ==
Inmate Name	Register Number	Status	Details
George Emil Banks	AY6066	Originally sentenced to death, sentence commuted to life in prison on May 12, 2010 after he was declared incompetent to be executed.	Perpetrator of the 1982 Wilkes-Barre shootings in which he murdered 13 people, including 5 of his own children.
Cosmo DiNardo	NK0995	Serving 4 life sentences without parole.	One of the perpetrators of the July 2017 Pennsylvania murders in which DiNardo and another person, Sean Michael Kratz, killed 4 individuals during deals involving marijuana.
Anthony Joyner	AY5659	Serving a life sentence.	Raped and murdered at least 6 women at a nursing home in the 1980s.
Ronald Taylor	EX2412	Died on April 2, 2024 while awaiting execution on death row.	Perpetrator of the 2000 Wilkinsburg shooting.

- Cool C, rapper and murderer. Sentenced to death.
- Danilo Cavalcante, escaped prisoner who led police on a 14-day manhunt throughout Chester County, imprisoned for killing his girlfriend.
- Bill Cosby, actor, comedian, and formerly convicted sex offender who was released on June 30, 2021 after his conviction was vacated by the Pennsylvania Supreme Court.
- Eric Frein, ambushed 2 Pennsylvania State Police, murdering Corporal Bryon K. Dickson Jr., in September 2014. Sentenced to death.
- Melvin Knight, one of the murderers of Jennifer Daugherty. Sentenced to death.
- Joshua Komisarjevsky, one of two perpetrators of the Cheshire, Connecticut, home invasion murders. Connecticut inmate incarcerated in Pennsylvania, originally sentenced to death commuted to life in prison after the death penalty was declared unconstitutional by the Connecticut Supreme Court. Currently incarcerated in SCI Mahanoy.
- Joseph Ligon, America's oldest and longest-serving juvenile lifer. Originally sentenced to life in prison without parole, released on February 11, 2021, after the United States Supreme Court declared life sentences without parole for juveniles unconstitutional.
- Harvey Miguel Robinson, serial killer. Sentenced to death.
- Ricky Smyres, one of the murderers of Jennifer Daugherty. Sentenced to death.
- Raghunandan Yandamuri, murderer and kidnapper, since moved to State Correctional Institution – Somerset. Sentenced to death.
