= Raghunandan Yandamuri =

Indian citizen on death row in Pennsylvania, U.S.

- Mugshot of Yandamuri on May 12, 2023
- Born: Raghunandan Yandamuri; 21 February 1986 (age 40); Andhra Pradesh, India
- Other names: Raghu Yandamuri; Raghunadan Yandamuri
- Citizenship: Indian
- Status: Incarcerated on death row
- Motive: Ransom; Robbery
- Convictions: First degree murder (two counts); Kidnapping
- Penalty: Death (November 20, 2014)

Details
- Victims: Satyavathi Venna, 61; Saanvi Venna, 10-months-old
- Date: October 22, 2012
- Country: United States
- State: Pennsylvania
- Weapons: Knife; Handkerchief; Towel; Suitcase
- Date apprehended: October 26, 2012
- Imprisoned at: SCI Somerset (2024)

Raghunandan Yandamuri (born February 21, 1986) is an Indian murderer, and kidnapper, who is currently awaiting execution on death row in the U.S. Commonwealth of Pennsylvania, at SCI Somerset, as of 2024. On November 20, 2014, he was sentenced to death for the October 22, 2012, murder of 61-year-old Satyavathi Venna and the kidnapping-murder of her 10-month-old granddaughter, Saanvi Venna, at an Upper Merion Township apartment in Montgomery County. He was previously scheduled for execution by lethal injection on February 23, 2018, at age 32, but it was halted due to the 2015 moratorium of the death penalty in Pennsylvania.

== Personal life ==
According to Yandamuri's mother, his father was a police officer who was murdered in a terrorist attack while on duty. Yandamuri, who was 11 years old when his father died, was contemplating killing himself because he could not cope with the loss.

Not much is known about Yandamuri's personal life. He is a citizen of India and from the Indian state of Andhra Pradesh. He has an advanced degree in electrical and computer science engineering.

== Background ==
Two days prior to the murders and kidnapping, Yandamuri attended a next-door birthday party along with his wife, at the Marquis Apartments in King of Prussia. One of the murder victims, 10-month-old Saanvi Venna, along with her parents, Chenchu and Venkata Venna were also present at the party. At some point during the party, Saanvi's mother, Chenchu, was reported to have spoken about the gold jewelry that Saanvi was wearing and her being babysat by her grandparents. Yandamuri was also reported to have held Saanvi during the party. Prior to the crime, Yandamuri had lost $15,000 at a casino.

== Crime ==
On October 22, 2012, Yandamuri arrived at the Vennas’ apartment suite at Marquis, while wearing a black hoodie. Yandamuri proceeded to knock on the Vennas’ door, leading to 61-year-old Satyavathi Venna, Saanvi's grandmother, answering. Yandamuri then brandished a four-inch knife, in an attempt to abduct Saanvi. Satyavathi attempted to back away, into the kitchen where she would later die, as Yandamuri continued to brandish his knife and follow her. Yandamuri then picked up Saanvi, as he was still brandishing his knife towards Satyavathi. An altercation soon ensued, where Yandamuri allegedly fell down while holding Saanvi, causing him to slit Satyavathi's throat and fall down atop Saanvi. This was later proven false, as Satyavathi's autopsy show that she had died from three deep "chopping wounds" to her neck area, with some of them striking bone, as well as three stab wounds to her chest. She had also lost fingers in the altercation, as she had tried to guard her neck. After the altercation, Saanvi began to cry, due to Yandamuri falling on top of her. To muffle Saanvi's cries, Yandamuri placed a handkerchief in her mouth and later fastened a towel around the handkerchief to secure it. This later caused Saanvi to die from suffocation.

Yandamuri then proceeded to rummage through suitcases, finding Saanvi's jewellery in a blue suitcase. After this, Yandamuri placed Saanvi inside of the suitcase, half-zipped it, and left the suitcase inside the men's sauna of the apartment's gym. Yandamuri then went to his own apartment to take a shower, returning afterwards to discard the suitcase in a dumpster. Yandamuri also discarded some of the jewellery into the Schuylkill River and kept the remainder in a bag, concealed behind a vending machine inside of his office building. A ransom note for $50,000 was also left at the scene by Yandamuri, intended for Saanvi's parents. The note, with many spelling errors stated:

shiva[,] [sic; Venkata Venna] your daughter has been kidnapped[.] if [sic] you report this to cops[,] your daughter will be cut into pieces and found dead[.] if [sic] you inform this to anyone[,] you will find your daughter body parts [sic] thrown into your apartments[.] our [sic] prople [sic] are monitoring all your moves all the time[,] your emails & phones are being traced[.]

if [sic] you want your daughter alive and safe , [sic] follow our instructions carefully. we [sic] want $50,000.00 by end of the day[.] your [sic] wife[,] lata [Chenchu Venna] have [sic] to bring money to the location alone. if [sic] we see you or your wife accompanied with (or) informed to anyone (cop/human), you will find your daughter dead. This is very serious. Its [sic] up to you to decide, you want your fyr [sic] old daughter Smonths [sic] of your income.

By 8PM today, lata [Chenchu Venna] alone should get $50,000.00 cash and come to baha fresh at acme store complex. [sic] once [sic] our person receives money from her at baha fresh, we will call you and tell the address where to pick your baby home. Any cunning act from anyone of you [sic] will lead to your daughter's death.

Be prepared by 8PM today with cash. we [sic] dont want any excuses. Remember that your baby is starving since morning[.]

== Investigation, interrogation and arrest ==
The investigation into Yandamuri started when detectives from the Upper Merion police were alerted to the murder of Satyavathi, the disappearance of Saanvi from an apartment suite, and the ransom note left behind by Yandamuri. As days elapsed without any hint of a perpetrator, suspicion curved towards Yandamuri, a neighbor of the Vennas, who had shown an odd interest in Saanvi, days prior to her vanishing. After he was brought in for questioning, Yandamuri was initially defiant towards disclosing his actions, but as the evidence mounted against him, his attitude switched from defiance to desperation. Through hours of continuous interrogation, detectives were able to obtain proclamations from Yandamuri, exposing the details of the crime he had committed, leading to his arrest four days after the crime.

== Trial ==
Yandamuri's trial began on September 25, 2014 and was highly publicized and controversial, due to the nature of his crime and his Indian citizenship. The jury selection took several weeks due to the high-profile nature of his case. The prosecution presented many pieces of physical evidence connecting Yandamuri to the crime scene, including fingerprints, DNA samples and surveillance footage. Witnesses further testified that they saw Yandamuri near the victims’ apartment suite on the day of the crime.

Yandamuri's defence team provided a vigorous defence, arguing that their client had been coerced into confessing his role, by the detectives. They likewise questioned the reliability of the material evidence, suggesting that it may have been tampered with. Throughout the trial, Yandamuri maintained innocence, claiming that he had been framed for the murders. Nevertheless, his account was weakened by the overwhelming amount of evidence presented by the prosecutor, leaving little doubt in the minds of the jury about his guilt. At the end of his trial, Yandamuri was found guilty on all counts and officially sentenced to death on November 20, 2014, after he decided to give up on finding more arguments.

== Incarceration ==
As of 2024, Yandamuri is incarcerated on death row at SCI Somerset. He was previously incarcerated at SCI Greene and SCI Phoenix, until he was finally moved to SCI Somerset.

=== Postponed execution ===
On January 8, 2018, Yandamuri's execution warrant was signed. He was scheduled to be executed by lethal injection on February 23, 2018, at age 32, but it was halted due to the 2015 moratorium of the death penalty in Pennsylvania.

== See also ==
- Capital punishment in Pennsylvania
- Capital punishment in the United States
- List of death row inmates in the United States
- State Correctional Institution – Somerset
- Mir Aimal Kansi (another South Asian who was previously on death row in the United States, before his 2002 execution)
