= Vernon Johnson (priest) =

American saver of alcoholics (1920–1999)

Vernon E. Johnson (August 23, 1920 – April 30, 1999) was an Episcopal priest and recovering alcoholic who devoted his life to a claimed method of alcohol intervention. Johnson's main achievements lie in the field of treatment of chemical dependency, especially alcoholism. Johnson did not believe that an alcoholic needed to "hit rock bottom" before recovery. He introduced the concept of intervention by family, friends, and employers. He supported "early intervention", because it interrupted the progression of the disease of alcoholism before the disease completely destroyed the alcoholic's life.

Following his own recovery from alcoholism, in 1962 Johnson led a church group concerning alcohol intervention. As a Minnesota Episcopal priest, Johnson encouraged the incorporation of faith into the treatment and he convinced many churches to provide space for recovering alcoholics' support group meetings. Johnson was also a member of faculty of the Rutgers University Summer School for Alcohol Studies. In 1966, he co-founded (along with Irene and Wheelock Whitney) the Johnson Institute, which aims to provide early intervention and help employers deal with employee drinking. The institute has also provided training to over 8,000 professionals.

The Johnson Institute uses the "Minnesota Model", which Johnson constructed when he was leading the church group. Johnson's approach, known as a Johnson Intervention, has become the most widespread intervention technique for Alcohol Use Disorders, but critics argue that there is a lack of support for the approach in controlled research and that there is a potential for adverse results.

In 2009, the Johnson Institute transferred its programs and products to the Hazelden Foundation. Johnson also wrote several books about the treatment of chemical dependency, the most famous being I'll Quit Tomorrow. Johnson died in 1999 from cancer.

== Published books ==
- I'll Quit Tomorrow- First published in 1973 by Harper & Row Publishers, ISBN 0-06-250433-9

Seven editions have been published to date.

- Intervention, how to help someone who doesn't want help : a step-by-step guide for families and friends of chemically dependent persons

First published in Minneapolis, Johnson Institute Books, 1986. ISBN 0-935908-31-5 Five editions have been published to date.

- Everything You Need to Know about Chemical Dependence: Vernon Johnson's complete guide for families

First published in Minneapolis : Johnson Institute, 1990, ISBN 0-935908-31-5 Two editions have been published to date.

- God, Help Me to Be Me: Spiritual Growth During Recovery

First published in Minneapolis, Johnson Institute, 1991. ISBN 0935908897

- Behavior Vs. Values: Character Conflict During Recovery

First Published in Minneapolis, Johnson Institute, 1991. ISBN 0-935908-88-9

- Alcoholism and the church: A call to action

First published in New York : Episcopal Church. Church Pension Fund, 1979
