= Serious case review =

English judicial procedure

A serious case review (SCR) in England is held after a child or vulnerable adult dies or is seriously injured under circumstances where abuse or neglect are thought to have been involved. Its purpose is to learn lessons to help prevent future similar incidents. Similar procedures in other countries of the UK are called child practice reviews in Wales, case management reviews in Northern Ireland, and significant case reviews in Scotland.

== Procedure ==
The Local Safeguarding Children Boards (LSCB) follow statutory guidance for conducting a serious case review in which the different professionals and organisations involved and the family are represented. The SCR should be completed within six months.

An SCR may also be commissioned following the death or injury of a vulnerable adult. For example, in 2010 Warwickshire County Council commissioned an SCR following the murder of 27-year old Gemma Hayter, because "a vulnerable adult had died and abuse or neglect is known or suspected to be a factor in the death; and the case gives rise to concerns about the way in which local professionals and/or services work together to safeguard vulnerable adults".
