= Murder of Shakira Spencer =

2022 murder in London, England

Shakira Spencer (13 June 1987 – September 2022) was a 35-year-old mother-of-two from Ealing, west London, who was tortured, beaten and ultimately murdered by Ashana Studholme, Lisa Richardson and Shaun Pendlebury, who she considered to be her friends. On 12 September 2022, the trio left Spencer's body in her flat where it was discovered badly decomposed by police two weeks later after neighbours noted maggots crawling out of her front door.

Following a 12-week trial, the trio were found guilty of her murder in December 2023 and subsequently sentenced to life with a minimum of 34 years in February 2024.

== Background ==
Born on 13 June 1987, Spencer was described by neighbours as "a loveable person, but very slow and socially awkward who presented as someone with learning difficulties". She was befriended by Ashana Studholme in 2021 when Studholme became her neighbour. After drawing Spencer into her social circle, which included introducing her to drugs, and isolating her from everyone she had previously known, Studholme and two accomplices, her friend Lisa Richardson and former boyfriend Shaun Pendlebury, subjected Spencer to several months of abuse, which included torture and beatings. Spencer was also treated like a slave by the trio, who forced her to run errands, controlled her income, and fed her on sachets of ketchup. The abuse culminated on 12 September 2022, when Spencer was beaten "to the brink of death" at Studholme's flat, then driven home by Studholme and Pendlebury in the boot of Studholme's car, where she was locked in a hall cupboard and later died as a result of her injuries. Her badly decomposed body was discovered almost two weeks later, on 25 September, when neighbours reported seeing maggots crawling from under the front door of Spencer's flat. Investigators were unable to determine the exact time of death.

== Arrest and trial ==
Studholme, Richardson and Pendlebury were arrested the following day after police were contacted by a relative of Pendlebury's to whom he had confessed his role in the killing. Three days later, following the discovery of text messages and mobile phone recordings showing Spencer being beaten by the trio, they were charged with her murder. On 30 September, all three defendants appeared at Westminster Magistrates Court, where they were remanded in custody. They pleaded not-guilty on 20 December, and a trial date was set the following year for 4 September 2023.

Following a 12-week trial at the Old Bailey, Studholme, Richardson and Pendlebury were convicted of Spencer's murder on 11 December 2023. Following the trial, Ealing Borough Council said it had launched an Adult Safeguarding Review of the case. In February 2024, Studholme, Richardson and Pendlebury were each sentenced to life imprisonment with a minimum term of 34 years. In her sentencing statement, Judge Angela Rafferty told the trio they had shown no remorse for their actions and their only concern was for themselves. All three will become eligible for parole on 25 May 2056.

== See also ==
- Murder of Gemma Hayter
- Murder of Deborah Chong
