= Chester County Prison =

Prison in Chester County, Pennsylvania

- Interactive map of Chester County Prison
- Location: West Chester postal address, Chester County, Pennsylvania, US; 39.908081°N 75.660461°W
- Status: Operational
- Security class: Minimum-Medium-Maximum
- Capacity: 1,100
- Population: 702 (June 30, 2023)
- Opened: 1959
- Warden: Howard Holland (acting warden)
- Website: www.chesco.org

Notable prisoners
- Danilo Cavalcante

Chester County Prison is a prison operated by Chester County, Pennsylvania, located in Pocopson Township, with a West Chester, Pennsylvania postal address. It has the capacity to hold 1,100 inmates, both men and women, and as of June 30, 2023, has a population of 702.

The county prison drew national attention with the escape of inmate and Brazilian native Danilo Cavalcante on August 31, 2023. After a 14-day manhunt by authorities, Danilo Cavalcante was apprehended under a pile of wood near South Coventry Township, Pennsylvania, on September 13, 2023.

== History ==
The Chester County Prison was built in 1959 to replace the previous county jail, which was declared unsafe in 1951. The new prison was designed to support medium and maximum security prisoners, with separate housing for male and female inmates, as well as juveniles. In 1983, parts of the prison were renovated and expanded. In 1993, a new Work Release Center was constructed on prison property.

== Incidents ==
On May 19, 2019, at approximately 11:30 p.m. inmate Igor Bolte escaped Chester County prison. Igor Bolte was 3 months into his 23-month sentence for violating his probation when he scaled an exercise yard wall and climbed down to a less secure section. He was found over three hours later in Pocopson Township, and was charged with escape, a felony in the third degree.

On August 31, 2023, at 8:51 a.m. inmate Danilo Cavalcante escaped, using the same method as Bolte. Cavalcante was to be transferred to a state prison to serve his life sentence for murder. Hundreds of law enforcement officers, including US Marshals, SWAT personnel, and personnel from local, state, and federal agencies, conducted a 14-day manhunt for Cavalcante which ended on September 13, 2023. During the night of September 11, 2023, Cavalcante stole a .22 caliber rifle, and two days later was captured in South Coventry Township, 23 miles away from the prison
