= Frenemies: Loyalty Turned Lethal =

- No. of seasons: 2
- No. of episodes: 24

Original release
- Network: Investigation Discovery
- Release: January 10, 2013 – March 6, 2014

Frenemies: Loyalty Turned Lethal is an American television documentary series that aired on Investigation Discovery for two seasons, from January, 2013, to March 2014. The show is about frenemy (a portmanteau of friend and enemy) relationships that take a lethal turn.

Season	Episodes	Season premiere	Season finale
1	12	January 10, 2013	March 14, 2013
2	12	January 2, 2014	March 6, 2014
