= List of Pennsylvania state prisons =

This is a list of state prisons in Pennsylvania. It does not include federal prisons or county jails located in the Commonwealth of Pennsylvania.

== Historical (closed) ==
- Eastern State Penitentiary, Fairmount, Philadelphia, Pennsylvania. Closed in 1971.
- Quehanna Boot Camp, Karthaus Township, Pennsylvania. Co-ed and six-month duration. Closed in 2026.
- State Correctional Institution – Cresson, Cresson, Pennsylvania. Converted from a psychiatric hospital. Closed in 2013.
- State Correctional Institution – Graterford, Skippack Township, Pennsylvania. Closed 2018.
- State Correctional Institution – Greensburg, Greensburg, Pennsylvania. Closed in 2013
- State Correctional Institution – Pittsburgh, Pittsburgh, Pennsylvania. Closed in 2017.
- State Correctional Institution – Retreat, Hunlock Creek, Pennsylvania. Converted from a psychiatric hospital. Opened 1980. Closed June 30, 2020.
- State Correctional Institution – Rockview, Benner Township, Pennsylvania. Closed in 2026.
- State Correctional Institution – Waynesburg, Morgan Township, Pennsylvania. Closed in 2003.

== Young adult offenders male ages 16–25 ==
Institution Name	Location	Security Level
State Correctional Institution – Pine Grove	Indiana, Pennsylvania	Maximum Security

== Adult female institutions ==
Institution Name	Location	Notes
State Correctional Institution – Cambridge Springs	Cambridge Springs, Pennsylvania	Minimum security
State Correctional Institution – Muncy	Muncy, Pennsylvania	Close security. Houses all female capital punishment inmates & diagnostic and classification center for women.

== Adult male institutions ==
=== Minimum security ===
Institution Name	Location	Notes
State Correctional Institution – Laurel Highlands	Somerset, Pennsylvania	Houses geriatric and mentally ill inmates
State Correctional Institution – Mercer	Mercer, Pennsylvania	
State Correctional Institution – Waymart	Waymart, Pennsylvania	Originally part Farview State Hospital. Has Forensic Treatment Unit & houses inmates with mental disorders who require inpatient psychiatric care and treatment. The 1989 riot at the State Correctional Institution – Camp Hill expedited the opening.

=== Medium security ===
Institution Name	Location	Notes
State Correctional Institution – Albion	Albion, Pennsylvania	Also close-security
State Correctional Institution – Benner Township	Benner Township, Pennsylvania	
State Correctional Institution – Coal Township	Coal Township, Pennsylvania	
State Correctional Institution – Chester	Chester, Pennsylvania	Opened 1998 first facility to treat inmates with substance use and be tobacco free
State Correctional Institution – Dallas	Dallas, Pennsylvania	Was originally designed for "defective delinquents"
State Correctional Institution – Houtzdale	Houtzdale, Pennsylvania	
State Correctional Institution – Mahanoy	Frackville, Pennsylvania	
State Correctional Institution – Somerset	Somerset, Pennsylvania	

=== Close security ===
Institution Name	Location	Notes
State Correctional Institution – Camp Hill	Camp Hill, Pennsylvania	Diagnostic and classification center, riots occurred here in 1989
State Correctional Institution – Huntingdon	Smithfield Township, Huntingdon County, Pennsylvania	Opened 1889 first for young offenders and then "defective delinquents" modeled after the Elmira Correctional Facility
State Correctional Institution – Smithfield	Smithfield Township, Huntingdon County, Pennsylvania	

=== Maximum security ===
Institution Name	Location	Notes
State Correctional Institution – Fayette	La Belle, Pennsylvania	
State Correctional Institution – Forest	Marienville, Pennsylvania	
State Correctional Institution – Frackville	Frackville, Pennsylvania	
State Correctional Institution – Phoenix	Skippack, Pennsylvania	Opened July 11, 2018, replacing the adjoining State Correctional Institution – Graterford, which had been Pennsylvania's largest prison. Graterford opened in 1929 and worked with Eastern State Penitentiary until its closing in 1970.

=== Supermax security ===
Institution Name	Location	Notes
State Correctional Institution – Greene	Waynesburg, Pennsylvania	Houses most of state's capital punishment inmates
