= Quehanna Boot Camp =

Prison in Pennsylvania, United States

Coordinates: 41°11′08″N 78°08′39″W

Quehanna Movational Boot Camp
- Interactive map of Quehanna Movational Boot Camp
- Location: Karthaus Township, Clearfield County, Pennsylvania
- Security class: Minimum-Security
- Opened: June 1992
- Closed: 2026
- Managed by: Pennsylvania Department of Corrections

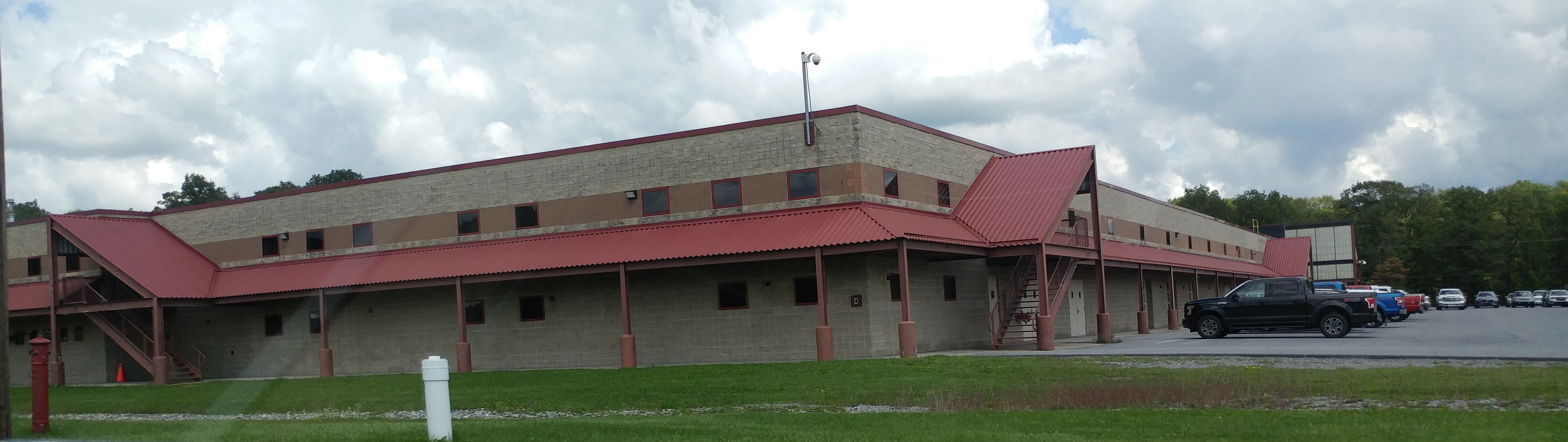
Quehanna Boot Camp

Quehanna Motivational Boot Camp was a mixed-sex, six-month, military-style boot camp program operated by the Pennsylvania Department of Corrections in rural Clearfield County. In September 2025, Governor Josh Shapiro announced a decision to close Quehanna Boot Camp, with the process to begin immediately. In December 2025 Quehanna held 89 inmates against a public capacity of 612 individuals, or 14.5%. The last inmates were transferred out on January 28, 2026.

== The creation of Quehanna ==
Quehanna was established in the 1990s as the department's first boot camp, utilizing both federal and state funding. The camp opened in June 1992, during the Robert P. Casey administration.

== The program ==
Inmates are assigned to the boot camp from their designated diagnostic centers (State Correctional Institution - Camp Hill or State Correctional Institution – Muncy), where they undergo strength testing. The program is six months long and involves intense physical activity and strict discipline. Vocational training, substance abuse counseling, and other counseling services are provided. Upon successful completion of the program, the inmate is released on parole.

== See also ==
- List of Pennsylvania state prisons
