= State Correctional Institution – Dallas =

Prison in Pennsylvania

Coordinates: 41°16′21″N 76°00′42″W

- Interactive map of State Correctional Institution – Dallas
- Location: Jackson Township, Luzerne County, near, Dallas, Pennsylvania, USA
- Managed by: Pennsylvania Department of Corrections

The State Correctional Institution – Dallas, commonly referred to as SCI Dallas, is a Pennsylvania Department of Corrections prison for men located in Luzerne County, Pennsylvania, United States. SCI Dallas houses about 2,140 inmates, some 400 of whom are serving life without the possibility of parole. It has 119 beds in its restricted housing unit (RHU). SCI Dallas was built to house 1,750 inmates.

== History ==
According to the official Department of Corrections web site, SCI Dallas (Luzerne County, 10 miles from Wilkes-Barre) was opened in 1960 as an institution for defective delinquents. After the state Supreme Court decision of 1966 voided the concept of "defective delinquents," Dallas, like Huntingdon, became an adult institution. It now is a medium-security facility for men."

== Notable prisoners ==
- George Feigley, sex cult leader
- Josoph Henry, convicted murderer
- Harry "The Hunchback" Riccobene – mobster
- William Michael Stankewicz – convicted attempted murderer and former teacher

== See also ==
- List of Pennsylvania state prisons
