= State Correctional Institution – Pittsburgh =

Former prison in Pennsylvania, United States

- Location in Pennsylvania
- Location: Pittsburgh, Pennsylvania; 40°28′13″N 80°2′28″W
- Status: Closed
- Security class: Low-Security, Medium-Security at its closing. However for many years it was Maximum security.
- Population: 1,500
- Opened: 1826; 1882 (Present location)
- Closed: 2005–2017
- Former name: Western Penitentiary
- Managed by: Pennsylvania Department of Corrections
- Governor: Tom Wolf
- Warden: Mark V. Capozza

SCI Pittsburgh (historically known as the "Western Penitentiary," "Western Pen," and "The Wall") was a low-to-medium security correctional institution, operated by the Pennsylvania Department of Corrections, located about five miles west of Downtown Pittsburgh and within city limits. The facility is on the banks of the Ohio River, and is located on 21 acres of land. (12 acres within the perimeter fence.) It was the first prison west of the Atlantic Plain as well as a Civil War prison in 1863–1864.

On January 26, 2017, Governor of Pennsylvania Tom Wolf announced the closing of this facility.

== History ==
The original layout of Western Penitentiary was designed by architect William Strickland and completed between 1818-1826. However, changes in the Pennsylvania System of imprisonment in 1829 necessitated the cell blocks to be replaced. Architect John Haviland designed the new cell blocks, which were rebuilt 1833-1837. The original site is now home to the National Aviary.

Western State Penitentiary would receive inmates convicted of terms of one year or more from the western half of the state. Inmates included men and women. Female inmates would be housed in Western Penitentiary until 1923. Inmates would be housed individually and were obliged to work. Inmate labor was primarily weaving and shoemaking.

During Charles Dickens’ visit to the city March 20–22, 1842, he visited the original prison. The visit had a major impact on Dickens. He later wrote of his visit, imagining the thoughts of the prisoners as they entered imprisonment. He felt that their conscious must be haunted by the "ghosts" of their misdeeds and it would be this visit that inspired him to write A Christmas Carol the following year.

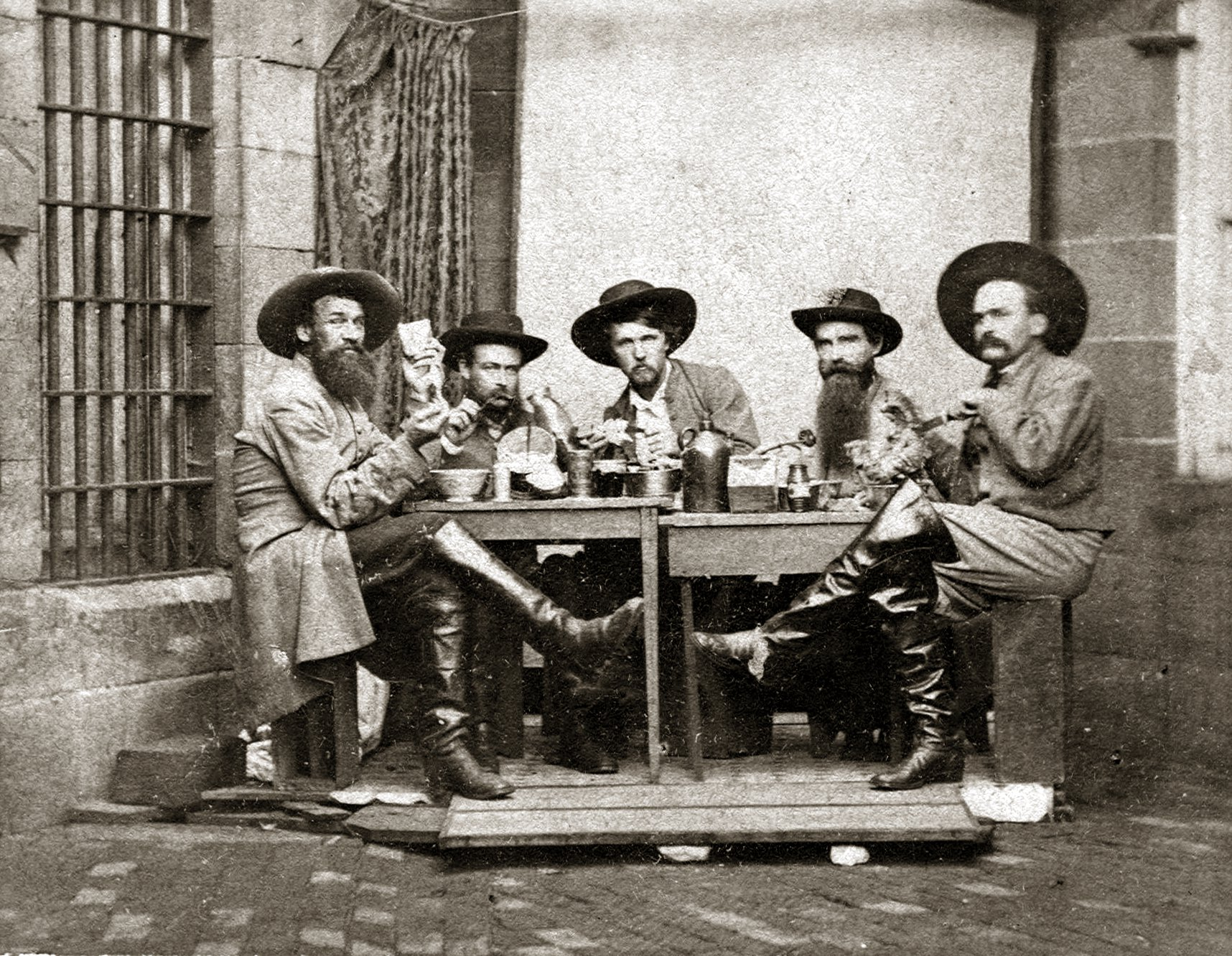
Group of "Morgan's Men" while prisoners of war in Western Penitentiary, Pennsylvania: (l to r) Captain William E. Curry, 8th Kentucky Cavalry; Lieutenant Andrew J. Church, 8th Kentucky Cavalry; Lieutenant Leeland Hathaway, 14th Kentucky Cavalry; Lieutenant Henry D. Brown, 10th Kentucky Cavalry; Lieutenant William Hays, 20th Kentucky Cavalry. All were captured with John Hunt Morgan in Ohio. 1863

The original location housed 118 Confederate soldiers after their capture in Morgan's Raid a dozen miles to the west. It held them from August 5, 1863 until they were transferred to a POW camp in Point Lookout, Maryland on March 16, 1864. It also housed female Confederate spy Sallie Pollock. However she was soon released due to poor health.

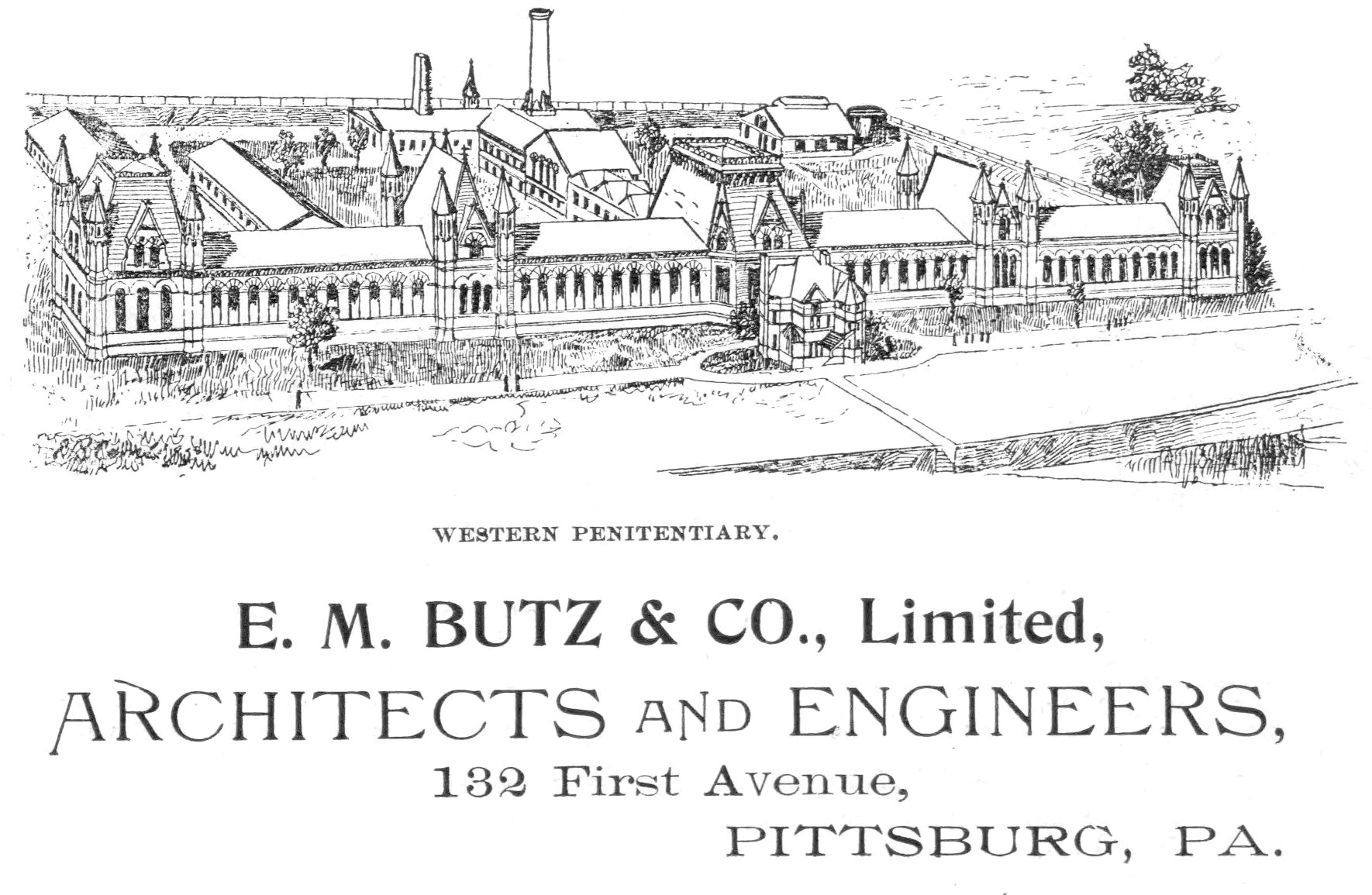
Advertisement for E. M. Butz & Co. featuring the Western Penitentiary, one of the firm’s most prominent works

Western State Penitentiary would push for changes to inmate labor. They succeeded in getting legislation passed to allow congregate labor in 1869. However, the prison design made the changes difficult to implement. Additionally, inmate population growth made the institution unsuitable for further growth. Prison officials began to explore possibilities for a new site, resulting in the move to a location less than two miles away. The site was the former juvenile detention center, the Western House of Refuge along the Ohio River. The site was purchased in 1878 and renovations immediately began.

The present facility, known as Riverside, started receiving inmates as early as 1879. It suffered major riots in 1921, 1924, 1953, and January 1987 which saw injuries to three guards, two firefighters and 24 inmates after 14 fires were started around 3:30 AM. Over 200 Pennsylvania State Police and Pittsburgh Police ended the 1987 riot by 11 AM. In January 2005, after transferring the inmates to SCI-Fayette, the facility was mothballed. In 2007, the facility re-opened with its current name. Until it was closed in 2017, it housed low and medium security inmates who required substance abuse treatment.

The campus was listed on the National Register of Historic Places in 2022.

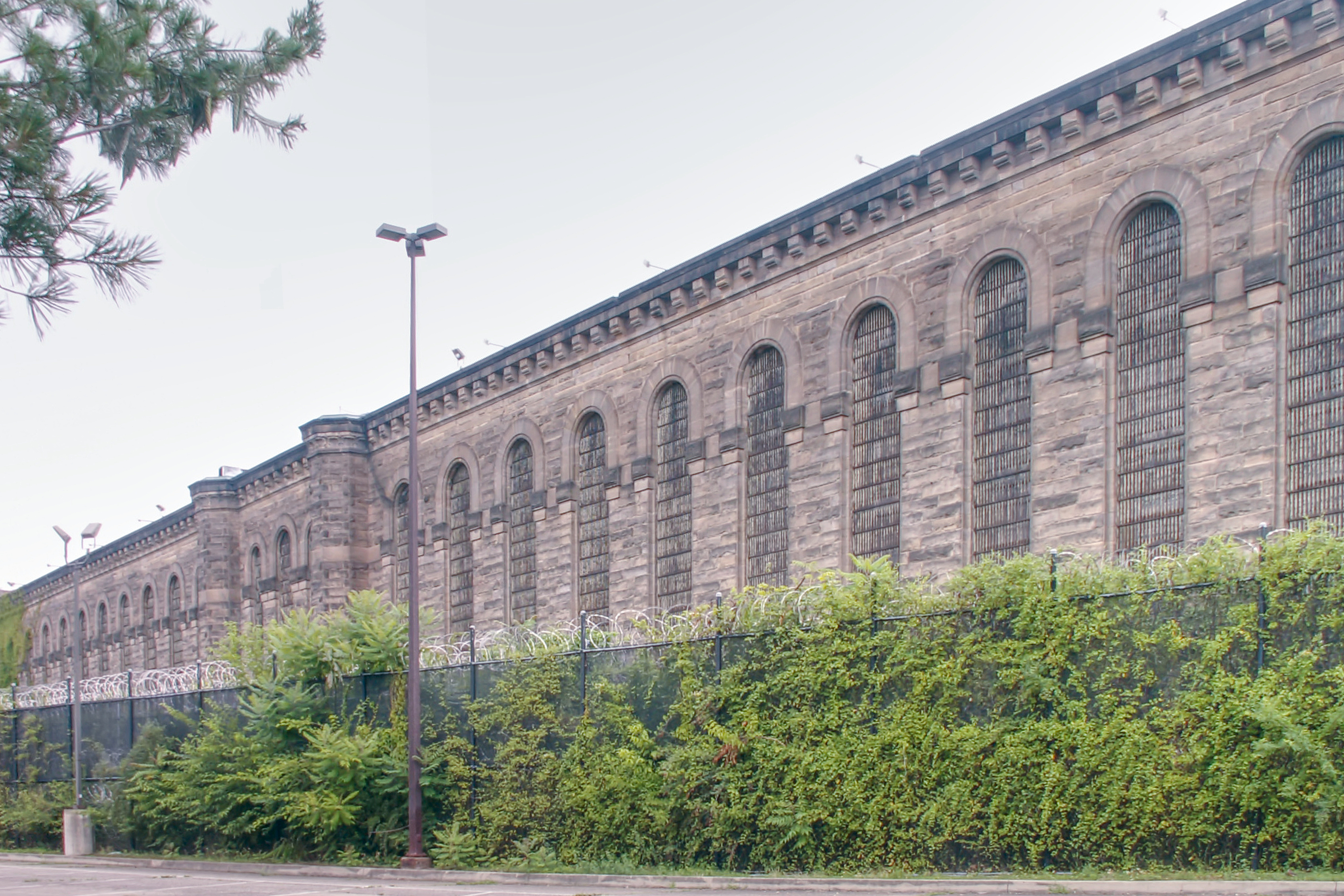
The abandoned facility in 2023

=== G-20 Protests ===
During the 2009 G-20 Pittsburgh summit, the prison was used as the main processing facility for rioters and protesters that were detained and arrested during the week-long summit.

== Notable prisoners ==
- George Feigley, the leader of a sex cult, served part of his sentence at Western Penitentiary. In 1983 two of his followers drowned near the prison in what authorities believe was an attempt to break him out. He was first transferred to Western Penitentiary after plans for him to escape from SCI-Graterford by helicopter were uncovered. After the botched breakout in 1983, Feigley was transferred to SCI-Huntingdon.
- Alexander Berkman, who unsuccessfully attempted to assassinate businessman Henry Clay Frick, served 14 years in the Western Penitentiary. That experience was the basis of his first book, Prison Memoirs of an Anarchist.
- Nuno Pontes and five others who escaped from the prison feature in the Season 1, Episode 2 of the National Geographic TV docudrama series, Breakout. The episode is titled "The Pittsburgh Six". They are also featured in the Season 1, Episode 4 of the History Channel TV series, History's Greatest Escapes with Morgan Freeman.
- Gerald Mayo, who filed a lawsuit against Satan and his servants in United States District Court.

== Fictional Portrayals ==
The 1978 film The Brink's Job the character Stanley Gusciora is sentenced to 20 years at the "Western Penitentiary at Pittsburgh".

The 1993 film "Striking Distance" references "Western Penitentiary" in a verbal argument between Tom Hardy and Detective Nick Detillo.
