= State Correctional Institution – Frackville =

Prison in Pennsylvania, United States

Coordinates: 40°46′18″N 76°12′32″W

State Correctional Instuition - Frackville
- Interactive map of State Correctional Instuition - Frackville
- Location: Ryan Township, Schuylkill County, Pennsylvania
- Security class: Maximum-Security
- Capacity: 1192
- Opened: 1987
- Managed by: Pennsylvania Department of Corrections

The State Correctional Institution – Frackville is a maximum-security correctional facility for males off Interstate 81 in Ryan Township in rural Schuylkill County, Pennsylvania, on the outskirts of Frackville and about 40 miles (64 km) northwest of Reading.

In 2017, the Pennsylvania Department of Corrections considered closing the prison, as part of an attempt by the state government to reduce the state's budget deficit. However, the prison was spared closure. Had SCI - Frackville closed it would likely have dealt a significant blow to the local economy, as it employs over 400 staff.

In December of 2025, Frackville held 1,149 inmates against a public capacity of 1,289 individuals, or 89.1%.

== Construction and development of SCI-Frackville ==
Construction of SCI-Frackville cost $33 Million to construct and spurred development of motels and other businesses in the area.

== Notable prisoners ==
- George Feigley served part of his sentence at SCI-Frackville. He and his wife Sandra's website www.prisoners.com was highly critical of the prison.
- Anthony Peterson Jr. was to serve 11 years of the 14-year sentence for shooting Curtis Brinkley. According to Pennsylvania Department of Corrections, Peterson served his sentence at this facility.
- Harold Haulman, serial killer

== See also ==
- List of Pennsylvania state prisons
