= Lambda Alpha =

American anthropology honor society

- ΛΑ
- Founded: March 15, 1968; 58 years ago Wichita State University
- Type: Honor
- Affiliation: Independent
- Status: Active
- Emphasis: Anthropology
- Scope: National (US)
- Motto: “The Study of Humankind"
- Member badge
- Colors: Red, White, and Black
- Publication: Lambda Alpha Journal
- Chapters: 239
- Headquarters: P.O. Box 92365; Southlake, Texas 76092; United States
- Website: laanthro.org

Lambda Alpha National Anthropology Honor Society (ΛΑ) is an American collegiate honor society for anthropology. It was founded in 1968 at Wichita State University.

== History ==
Darrell Casteel, a student at Wichita State University, established Lambda Alpha on March 15, 1968. Its purpose is to reward and acknowledge academic excellence in the field of anthropology. The society's first faculty sponsor was Dr. Lowell D. Holmes. This founding chapter became Alpha of Kansas.

The charter members of Alpha of Kansas were:

- Nancy Alfonso
- Leland K. Blazer
- Frank V. Botteri
- Charles L. Bole
- Alice L. Brosius
- Lester E. Bower
- Jackson Carter
- Darrell L. Casteel
- Mary Susan Colcher
- Howard Fries
- Edward L. Greenamyre
- Lonnie D. Halouska
- Virginia A. Hawkey
- Lowell D. Holmes
- Lyle R. James
- Jerry Martin
- John McBride
- Georgette Meredith
- Marilyn K. Moore
- Karen J. Morse
- Wayne Parris
- Ellen C. Rhoads
- Jo Ann Rosenthal
- Richard J. Ruppel
- Karl Schlesier
- Loring B. Smith
- Sanford E. Swanson
- Lucretia D. Vickery

Holmes and the charter members selected the name Lambda Alpha and created its constitution and its logo. Casteel was elected the national and chapter president. Colcher became the national secretary. Holmes served as the Lambda Alpha executive secretary from its founding until 1973.

Alpha of Indiana was chartered at Ball State University on July 9, 1968. This was followed by Alpha of Pennsylvania at Alliance College in January 1969 and Alpha of Maryland at Bowie State University in April 1969. In 1968, the society began planning the Lambda Alpha Journal of Man; the first issue was published in January 1969. It included articles by faculty and students. Wichita State University subsidized and published the journal.

The national society was initially run by student members from Wichita State but this resulted in some problems. In November 1973 Lambda Alpha established a national executive council. Dr. Charles R. Jenkins, the faculty sponsor of Alpha of Pennsylvania, was selected to serve as the society's national executive secretary at that time. He served in this capacity until he died in 1985.

Dr. B. K. Swartz Jr., founder of the Alpha of Indiana chapter at Ball State University, served as national executive secretary from November 5, 1985 to 2011. Lambda Alpha Journal of Man became Lambda Alpha Journal in 1991.

== Symbols ==
The name is Lambda Alpha consists of the first letters of the Greek phrase Logos Anthropos (Greek: Λογος Ανθροποσ), which translates as "the study of man". Today, the society uses "the study of humankind" as its mission statement.

The society's colors are red, white, and black. Its regalia stole is white with a gold globe and a blue insignia. Its pen or key is one inch in length and is either of 10 carat white or yellow-gold filled. The square center table of the key exhibits the letters of the society, Λ and Α, with a helm, scroll and globe placed in descending order between the letters.

== Membership ==
Membership in Lambda Alpha is open to juniors and seniors who have completed twelve hours of anthropology courses with a 3.0 GPA in those courses and a 2.5 GPA overall. Graduate students can also join.

== Activities ==
Lambda Alpha offers annual scholarships to students of anthropology, including its Lambda Alpha National Scholarship which awards $5,000 to seniors, and its Lambda Alpha Graduate Student Research Grants of $2,000.

The society publishes the Alpha Lambda Annual Newsletter and an annual magazine, Lambda Alpha Journal, which consists of peer-reviewed student articles. It also awards prizes for student papers.

== Governance ==
Dr. Ritu Gairola Khanduri is the society's executive director.

== Chapters ==
Following is a list a Lambda Alpha chapters. Active chapters are indicated in bold. Inactive chapters and institutions are in italics.

Chapter	Charter date and range	Institution	Location	Status	Ref.
**Alpha of Kansas**	March 15, 1968	Wichita State University	Wichita, Kansas	Active	
**Alpha of Indiana**	July 9, 1968	Ball State University	Muncie, Indiana	Active	
Alpha of Pennsylvania	January 1969 – 1987	Alliance College	Cambridge Springs, Pennsylvania	Inactive	(Note: The chapter went dormant when Alliance College closed in 1987.)
**Alpha of Maryland**	April 1969	Bowie State University	Bowie, Maryland	Active	
**Alpha of California**	197x ?	California State University, Chico	Chico, California	Active	
Alpha of Florida	197x ?	University of South Florida	Tampa, Florida	Inactive	
**Alpha of Washington**	197x ?	Eastern Washington University	Cheney, Washington	Active	
**Beta of California**	197x ?	California State University, Sacramento	Sacramento, California	Active	
Beta of Pennsylvania	197x ?	Gannon University	Erie, Pennsylvania	Inactive	(Note: The university no longer has an anthropology department.)
**Alpha of New York**	May 20, 1974	State University of New York at Potsdam	Potsdam, New York	Active	
**Alpha of Illinois**	August 1974	Southern Illinois University Edwardsville	Edwardsville, Illinois	Active	
**Beta of North Carolina**	1975	East Carolina University	Greenville, North Carolina	Active	
**Alpha of New Jersey**	December 1976	Monmouth University	West Long Branch, New Jersey	Active	
**Gamma of Pennsylvania**	1977	Pennsylvania Western University, California	California, Pennsylvania	Active	
**Alpha of Georgia**	c. 1980	Georgia State University	Atlanta, Georgia	Active	
**Alpha of South Dakota**	c. 1980	University of South Dakota	Vermillion, South Dakota	Active	
**Alpha of Ohio**	c. 1980	Wright State University	Dayton, Ohio	Active	
**Alpha of West Virginia**	c. 1980	West Virginia University	Morgantown, West Virginia	Active	
**Beta of Florida**	c. 1980	Florida Atlantic University	Boca Raton, Florida	Active	
**Gamma of California**	c. 1980	University of San Diego	San Diego, California	Active	
Alpha of Iowa	1981	University of Northern Iowa	Cedar Falls, Iowa	Inactive	
**Alpha of Mississippi**	1981	Mississippi State University	Mississippi State, Mississippi	Active	
**Beta of Georgia**	1981	Emory University	Atlanta, Georgia	Active	
**Beta of Indiana**	1981	University of Notre Dame	Notre Dame, Indiana	Active	
Beta of Ohio	1981–1993	University of Toledo	Toledo, Ohio	Inactive	
Delta of California	1981–September 2020	California State University, Los Angeles	Los Angeles, California	Inactive	
Epsilon of California	1981	California State University, Stanislaus	Turlock, California	Inactive	
Alpha of Colorado	1985	Colorado State University	Fort Collins, Colorado	Inactive	
**Beta of New York**	October 1986	Colgate University	Hamilton, New York	Active	
**Alpha of Texas**	1987	University of Texas at Arlington	Arlington, Texas	Active	
**Alpha of Vermont**	1987	University of Vermont	Burlington, Vermont	Active	
**Beta of Illinois**	1987	Wheaton College	Wheaton, Illinois	Active	
Gamma of North Carolina	1987–1988	University of North Carolina at Chapel Hill	Chapel Hill, North Carolina	Inactive	
Zeta of California	1987	Occidental College	Los Angeles, California	Inactive	
**Gamma of New Jersey**	1988	William Paterson University	Wayne, New Jersey	Active	
**Eta of California**	1988	California State University, Fullerton	Fullerton, California	Active	
**Delta of Indiana**	1989	Indiana State University	Terre Haute, Indiana	Active	
**Alpha of Alabama**	199x ?	University of South Alabama	Mobile, Alabama	Active	
Alpha of Arizona	199x ?	Arizona State University	Tempe, Arizona	Inactive	
**Alpha of Arkansas**	19xx ?	University of Arkansas at Little Rock	Little Rock, Arkansas	Active	
**Alpha of Guam**	199x ?	University of Guam	Mangilao, Guam	Active	
**Alpha of Kentucky**	19xx ?	Western Kentucky University	Bowling Green, Kentucky	Active	
**Alpha of Louisiana**	199x ?	Louisiana State University	Baton Rouge, Louisiana	Active	
**Alpha of Michigan**	199x ?	University of Michigan–Flint	Flint, Michigan	Active	
**Alpha of Missouri**	199x ?	University of Missouri–St. Louis	St. Louis, Missouri	Active	
**Alpha of Montana**	199x ?	Montana State University	Bozeman, Montana	Active	
**Alpha of Nevada**	199x ?	University of Nevada, Las Vegas	Paradise, Nevada	Active	
**Alpha of New Hampshire**	199x ?	Franklin Pierce University	Rindge, New Hampshire	Active	
**Alpha of New Mexico**	199x ?	New Mexico State University	Las Cruces, New Mexico	Active	
**Alpha of North Carolina**	19xx ?	Wake Forest University	Winston-Salem, North Carolina	Active	
**Alpha of Oregon**	199x ?	Oregon State University	Corvallis, Oregon	Active	
**Alpha of Tennessee**	199x ?	University of Tennessee	Knoxville, Tennessee	Active	
Alpha of Utah	199x ?	Utah State University	Logan, Utah	Inactive	
**Alpha of Virginia**	199x ?	Radford University	Radford, Virginia	Active	
Alpha of Wisconsin	199x ?–201x ?	University of Wisconsin–Stevens Point	Stevens Point, Wisconsin	Inactive	
**Beta of Arkansas**	19xx ?	Hendrix College	Conway, Arkansas	Active	
**Beta of Colorado**	199x ?	Fort Lewis College	Durango, Colorado	Active	
**Beta of Iowa**	199x ?	University of Iowa	Iowa City, Iowa	Active	
**Beta of Kentucky**	199x ?	Murray State University	Murray, Kentucky	Active	
**Beta of Maryland**	199x ?	University of Maryland, Baltimore County	Catonsville, Maryland	Active	
**Beta of Michigan**	199x ?	Grand Valley State University	Allendale, Michigan	Active	
**Beta of Mississippi**	199x ?	University of Southern Mississippi	Hattiesburg, Mississippi	Active	
**Beta of Missouri**	199x ?	Washington University in St. Louis	St. Louis, Missouri	Active	
**Beta of New Jersey**	199x ?	Montclair State University	Upper Montclair, New Jersey	Active	
**Beta of Texas**	199x ?	University of Texas Rio Grande Valley	Edinburg, Texas	Active	
**Beta of Virginia**	199x ?	George Mason University	Fairfax, Virginia	Active	
**Beta of West Virginia**	199x ?	Marshall University	Huntington, West Virginia	Active	
**Beta of Wisconsin**	199x ?	University of Wisconsin–Milwaukee	Milwaukee, Wisconsin	Active	
**Gamma of Arkansas**	19xx ?	University of Arkansas	Fayetteville, Arkansas	Active	
**Gamma of Florida**	199x ?	University of Central Florida	Orlando, Florida	Active	
**Gamma of Illinois**	199x ?–2020	Illinois Wesleyan University	Bloomington, Illinois	Inactive	
**Gamma of Iowa**	199x ?	Drake University	Des Moines, Iowa	Active	
**Gamma of Kentucky**	199x ?	Northern Kentucky University	Highland Heights, Kentucky	Active	
**Gamma of Maryland**	199x ?	Washington College	Chestertown, Maryland	Active	
**Gamma of Missouri**	199x ?	University of Missouri	Columbia, Missouri	Active	
**Gamma of Ohio**	199x ?	College of Wooster	Wooster, Ohio	Active	
**Gamma of Texas**	199x ?	University of Texas at San Antonio	San Antonio, Texas	Active	
**Gamma of Virginia**	199x ?	College of William & Mary	Williamsburg, Virginia	Active	
**Gamma of Wisconsin**	199x ?	University of Wisconsin–Eau Claire	Eau Claire, Wisconsin	Active	
**Delta of Florida**	199x ?	University of Florida	Gainesville, Florida	Active	
**Delta of Illinois**	199x ?	Southern Illinois University Carbondale	Carbondale, Illinois	Active	
**Delta of Iowa**	199x ?	Luther College	Decorah, Iowa	Active	
**Delta of Kentucky**	199x ?	University of Kentucky	Lexington, Kentucky	Active	
**Delta of New York**	199x ?	Syracuse University	Syracuse, New York	Active	
**Delta of North Carolina**	199x ?	University of North Carolina at Greensboro	Greensboro, North Carolina	Active	
**Delta of Ohio**	199x ?	Ohio University	Athens, Ohio	Active	
**Delta of Pennsylvania**	199x ?	University of Pittsburgh	Pittsburgh, Pennsylvania	Active	
**Delta of Texas**	199x ?	Texas Tech University	Lubbock, Texas	Active	
**Epsilon of Indiana**	199x ?	Saint Mary’s College	Notre Dame, Indiana	Active	
**Epsilon of North Carolina**	199x ?	Appalachian State University	Boone, North Carolina	Active	
**Epsilon of Pennsylvania**	199x ?	Indiana University of Pennsylvania	Indiana, Pennsylvania	Active	
**Epsilon of Texas**	199x ?	Trinity University	San Antonio, Texas	Active	
**Zeta of New York**	199x ?	Union College	Schenectady, New York	Active	
**Zeta of North Carolina**	199x ?	University of North Carolina at Charlotte	Charlotte, North Carolina	Active	
**Zeta of Pennsylvania**	199x ?	Bloomsburg University of Pennsylvania	Bloomsburg, Pennsylvania	Active	
Zeta of Texas	199x ?	University of Texas at Austin	Austin, Texas	Inactive	
**Eta of New York**	199x ?	Hofstra University	Hempstead, New York	Active	
**Eta of Pennsylvania**	199x ?	Pennsylvania State University	University Park, Pennsylvania	Active	
**Eta of Texas**	199x ?	University of North Texas	Denton, Texas	Active	
**Theta of California**	199x ?	University of California, Berkeley	Berkeley, California	Active	
**Theta of New York**	199x ?	Hartwick College	Oneonta, New York	Active	
**Theta of Texas**	199x ?	Texas State University	San Marcos, Texas	Active	
**Iota of California**	199x ?	Saint Mary's College of California	Moraga, California	Active	
**Iota of New York**	199x ?	St. Lawrence University	Canton, New York	Active	
**Kappa of California**	199x ?	University of California, Irvine	Irvine, California	Active	
**Kappa of New York**	199x ?	State University of New York at Oswego	Oswego, New York	Active	
**Lambda of California**	199x ?	Vanguard University	Costa Mesa, California	Active	
**Lambda of New York**	199x ?	University at Buffalo	Buffalo, New York	Active	
**Mu of California**	199x ?	University of California, Santa Barbara	Santa Barbara, California	Active	
**Mu of New York**	199x ?	Elmira College	Elmira, New York	Active	
**Nu of California**	199x ?	California State University, Dominguez Hills	Carson, California	Active	
**Xi of California**	199x ?	Santa Clara University	Santa Clara, California	Active	
**Omicron of California**	199x ?	University of La Verne	La Verne, California	Active	
**Zeta of Michigan**	20xx ?	Central Michigan University	Mount Pleasant, Michigan	Active	
**Eta of Missouri**	20xx ?	Saint Louis University	St. Louis, Missouri	Active	
**Eta of North Carolina**	20xx ?	University of North Carolina Wilmington	Wilmington, North Carolina	Active	
**Theta of Missouri**	20xx ?	University of Central Missouri	Warrensburg, Missouri	Active	
**Iota of Missouri**	20xx ?–2022	Lindenwood University	St. Charles, Missouri	Inactive	
**Iota of North Carolina**	20xx ?	Elon University	Elon, North Carolina	Active	
**Pi of Pennsylvania**	20xx ?	Millersville University of Pennsylvania	Millersville, Pennsylvania	Active	
**Rho of Pennsylvania**	20xx ?	Muhlenberg College	Allentown, Pennsylvania	Active	
**Sigma of New York**	20xx ?	St. John’s University	Queens, New York City, New York	Active	
**Beta of Hawaii**	2009	University of Hawaiʻi at Mānoa	Honolulu, Hawaii	Active	
**Alpha of South Carolina**	201x ?	College of Charleston	Charleston, South Carolina	Active	
**Eta of Florida**	201x ?	University of Miami	Coral Gables, Florida	Active	
**Theta of Virginia**	201x ?	Christopher Newport University	Newport News, Virginia	Active	
**Lambda of Pennsylvania**	201x ?	Pennsylvania Western University, Edinboro	Edinboro, Pennsylvania	Active	
**Mu of Pennsylvania**	201x ?	Mercyhurst University	Erie, Pennsylvania	Active	
**Nu of Pennsylvania**	201x ?	West Chester University	West Chester, Pennsylvania	Active	
**Nu of Texas**	201x ?	University of Houston	Houston, Texas	Active	
**Xi of Texas**	201x ?	Texas Christian University	Fort Worth, Texas	Active	
**Omega of California**	201x ?	California State University San Marcos	San Marcos, California	Active	
**Psi of California**	201x ?	Sonoma State University	Rohnert Park, California	Active	
**Tau of New York**	201x ?	Buffalo State University	Buffalo, New York	Active	
**Epsilon of Florida**	2010	Florida International University	Miami, Florida	Active	
**Iota of Illinois**	2010	Northeastern Illinois University	Chicago, Illinois	Active	
**Kappa of Illinois**	2010	Illinois State University	Normal, Illinois	Active	
**Omicron of New York**	2010	Ithaca College	Ithaca, New York	Active	
**Pi of New York**	2010	Wagner College	Staten Island, New York	Active	
**Zeta of Missouri**	2011	Truman State University	Kirksville, Missouri	Active	
**Zeta of New Jersey**	2011	Drew University	Madison, New Jersey	Active	
**Eta of Virginia**	2011	University of Richmond	Richmond, Virginia	Active	
**Rho of New York**	2011	State University of New York at New Paltz	New Paltz, New York	Active	
**Chi of California**	2011	University of California, Merced	Merced, California	Active	
**Alpha of Rhode Island**	2012	University of Rhode Island	Kingston, Rhode Island	Active	
**Gamma of Connecticut**	2012	Southern Connecticut State University	New Haven, Connecticut	Active	
**Delta of Michigan**	2012	Alma College	Alma, Michigan	Active	
**Lambda of Illinois**	2012	North Central College	Naperville, Illinois	Active	
**Theta of North Carolina**	2012	Western Carolina University	Cullowhee, North Carolina	Active	
**Kappa of Pennsylvania**	2012	Saint Vincent College	Latrobe, Pennsylvania	Active	
**Mu of Illinois**	2012	University of Illinois Urbana-Champaign	Urbana, Illinois	Active	
**Zeta of Florida**	2013	Eckerd College	St. Petersburg, Florida	Active	
**Beta of Rhode Island**	April 2016	Roger Williams University	Bristol, Rhode Island	Active	
**Delta of Mississippi**	April 2016	Millsaps College	Jackson, Mississippi	Active	
**Beta of New Mexico**	May 2016	Eastern New Mexico University	Portales, New Mexico	Active	
**Kappa of Indiana**	May 2016	Indiana University Bloomington	Bloomington, Indiana	Active	
**Iota of Florida**	April 2017	University of South Florida St. Petersburg	St. Petersburg, Florida	Active	
**Epsilon of Maryland**	August 2017	Goucher College	Baltimore, Maryland	Active	
**Alpha of Nebraska**	September 2017	Creighton University	Omaha, Nebraska	Active	
**Epsilon of Mississippi**	November 2017	Albion College	Albion, Michigan	Active	
**Theta of Florida**	November 2017	Rollins College	Winter Park, Florida	Active	
**Nu of Illinois**	November 2017	Eastern Illinois University	Charleston, Illinois	Active	
**Xi of Pennsylvania**	November 2017	Kutztown University of Pennsylvania	Kutztown, Pennsylvania	Active	
**Omicron of Pennsylvania**	November 2017	Ursinus College	Collegeville, Pennsylvania	Active	
**Alpha of Idaho**	2018	Idaho State University	Pocatello, Idaho	Active	
**Beta of South Carolina**	2018	Clemson University	Clemson, South Carolina	Active	
**Beta of Utah**	2018	Weber State University	Ogden, Utah	Active	
**Gamma of Alabama**	2018	Auburn University	Auburn, Alabama	Active	
**Epsilon of Michigan**	2018	Albion College	Albion, Michigan	Active	
**Epsilon of Tennessee**	2018	Middle Tennessee State University	Murfreesboro, Tennessee	Active	
**Zeta of Maryland**	c. 2018	Towson University	Towson, Maryland	Active	
**Eta of New Jersey**	2018	The College of New Jersey	Ewing Township, New Jersey	Active	
**Iota of Ohio**	2018	Kenyon College	Gambier, Ohio	Active	
**Iota of Virginia**	2018	University of Mary Washington	Fredericksburg, Virginia	Active	
**Kappa of Florida**	2018	Florida State University	Tallahassee, Florida	Active	
**Lambda of Florida**	2018	University of North Florida	Jacksonville, Florida	Active	
**Alpha Beta of California**	2018	California State University, East Bay	Hayward, California	Active	
**Beta of Idaho**	2019	College of Western Idaho	Nampa, Idaho	Active	
**Zeta of Colorado**	2019	University of Colorado Denver	Denver, Colorado	Active	
**Zeta of Wisconsin**	2019	Marquette University	Milwaukee, Wisconsin	Active	
**Xi of Illinois**	2019	Western Illinois University	Macomb, Illinois	Active	
**Omicron of Texas**	2019	Texas A&M University	College Station, Texas	Active	
**Beta of South Dakota**	2020	Augustana University	Sioux Falls, South Dakota	Active	
**Gamma of Utah**	2020	Southern Utah University	Cedar City, Utah	Active	
**Delta of Alabama**	2020	Troy University	Troy, Alabama	Active	
**Epsilon of Alabama**	2020	University of Alabama at Birmingham	Birmingham, Alabama	Active	
**Theta of New Jersey**	2020	Rowan University	Glassboro, New Jersey	Active	
**Mu of Florida**	2020	Flagler College	St. Augustine, Florida	Active	
**Gamma of Idaho**	2021	Boise State University	Boise, Idaho	Active	
**Upsilon of New York**	2021	State University of New York at Plattsburgh	Plattsburgh, New York	Active	
**Alpha Gamma of California**	2021	University of California, Santa Cruz	Santa Cruz, California	Active	
**Gamma of Idaho**	202x ?	Boise State University	Boise, Idaho	Active	
**Zeta of Alabama**	202x ?	Auburn University at Montgomery	Montgomery, Alabama	Active	
**Eta of Colorado**	202x ?	Metropolitan State University of Denver	Denver, Colorado	Active	
Alpha of Alaska		University of Alaska Anchorage	Anchorage, Alaska	Inactive	
**Alpha of Connecticut**		University of Connecticut	Storrs, Connecticut	Active	
**Alpha of Hawaii**		University of Hawaiʻi at West Oʻahu	Kapolei, Hawaii	Active	
**Alpha of Idaho**		Idaho State University	Pocatello, Idaho	Active	
**Alpha of Maine**		University of Maine	Orono, Maine	Active	
**Alpha of Massachusetts**		College of the Holy Cross	Worcester, Massachusetts	Active	
**Alpha of Minnesota**		Gustavus Adolphus College	St. Peter, Minnesota	Active	
**Alpha of Oklahoma**		University of Tulsa	Tulsa, Oklahoma	Active	
**Beta of Alabama**		University of Alabama	Tuscaloosa, Alabama	Active	
**Beta of Connecticut**		Central Connecticut State University	New Britain, Connecticut	Active	
**Beta of Idaho**		College of Western Idaho	Nampa, Idaho	Active	
**Beta of Louisiana**		Tulane University	New Orleans, Louisiana	Active	
**Beta of Massachusetts**		University of Massachusetts Boston	Boston, Massachusetts	Active	
**Beta of Minnesota**		Minnesota State University, Mankato	Mankato, Minnesota	Active	
**Beta of Montana**		University of Montana	Missoula, Montana	Active	
**Beta of Oregon**		Portland State University	Portland, Oregon	Active	
**Beta of Tennessee**		Lee University	Cleveland, Tennessee	Active	
**Beta of Washington**		Washington State University	Pullman, Washington	Active	
**Gamma of Colorado**		University of Denver	Denver, Colorado	Active	
**Gamma of Georgia**		Georgia Southern University	Statesboro, Georgia	Active	
**Gamma of Hawaii**		Brigham Young University–Hawaii	Lāʻie, Hawaii	Active	
**Gamma of Louisiana**		Northwestern State University	Natchitoches, Louisiana	Active	
**Gamma of Massachusetts**		Bridgewater State University	Bridgewater, Massachusetts	Active	
**Gamma of Michigan**		Eastern Michigan University	Ypsilanti, Michigan	Active	
Gamma of Minnesota		St. Olaf College	Northfield, Minnesota	Inactive	
**Gamma of Mississippi**		University of Mississippi	University, Mississippi	Active	
**Gamma of Oregon**		Pacific University	Forest Grove, Oregon	Active	
**Gamma of Tennessee**		University of Tennessee at Chattanooga	Chattanooga, Tennessee	Active	
**Gamma of Washington**		Central Washington University	Ellensburg, Washington	Active	
**Delta of Arkansas**		University of Central Arkansas	Conway, Arkansas	Active	
**Delta of Colorado**		University of Colorado Colorado Springs	Colorado Springs, Colorado	Active	
**Delta of Georgia**		University of West Georgia	Carrollton, Georgia	Active	
**Delta of Maryland**		St. Mary's College of Maryland	St. Mary's City, Maryland	Active	
**Delta of Missouri**		Missouri State University	Springfield, Missouri	Active	
**Delta of New Jersey**		Seton Hall University	South Orange, New Jersey	Active	
**Delta of Oregon**		Linfield University	McMinnville, Oregon	Active	
**Delta of Tennessee**		University of Memphis	Memphis, Tennessee	Pending	
**Delta of Virginia**		Longwood University	Farmville, Virginia	Active	
**Delta of Wisconsin**		Lawrence University	Appleton, Wisconsin	Active	
**Epsilon of Arkansas**		Arkansas Tech University	Russellville, Arkansas	Active	
**Epsilon of Colorado**		Western Colorado University	Gunnison, Colorado	Active	
**Epsilon of Georgia**		Kennesaw State University	Kennesaw, Georgia	Active	
**Epsilon of Illinois**		Loyola University Chicago	Chicago, Illinois	Active	
**Epsilon of Iowa**		Cornell College	Mount Vernon, Iowa	Active	
**Epsilon of Kentucky**		Eastern Kentucky University	Richmond, Kentucky	Active	
**Epsilon of Missouri**		Webster University	Webster Groves, Missouri	Active	
**Epsilon of New Jersey**		Rutgers University–New Brunswick	New Brunswick, New Jersey	Active	
**Epsilon of New York**		State University of New York at Geneseo	Geneseo, New York	Active	
**Epsilon of Ohio**		Ohio State University	Columbus, Ohio	Active	
**Epsilon of Virginia**		James Madison University	Harrisonburg, Virginia	Active	
**Epsilon of Wisconsin**		Ripon College	Ripon, Wisconsin	Active	
**Zeta of Georgia**		University of Georgia	Athens, Georgia	Active	
**Zeta of Illinois**		DePaul University	Chicago, Illinois	Active	
**Zeta of Indiana**		DePauw University	Greencastle, Indiana	Active	
**Zeta of Kentucky**		Transylvania University	Lexington, Kentucky	Active	
**Zeta of Ohio**		Cleveland State University	Cleveland, Ohio	Active	
**Zeta of Virginia**		Washington and Lee University	Lexington, Virginia	Active	
**Eta of Illinois**		University of Illinois Chicago	Chicago, Illinois	Active	
**Eta of Indiana**		Indiana University–Purdue University Indianapolis	Indianapolis, Indiana	Active	
**Eta of Kentucky**		University of Louisville	Louisville, Kentucky	Active	
**Eta of Ohio**		Denison University	Granville, Ohio	Active	
**Theta of Illinois**		Lake Forest College	Lake Forest, Illinois	Active	
**Theta of Indiana**		Purdue University Fort Wayne	Fort Wayne, Indiana	Active	
**Theta of Ohio**		Case Western Reserve University	Cleveland, Ohio	Active	
**Theta of Pennsylvania**		Gettysburg College	Gettysburg, Pennsylvania	Active	
**Iota of Indiana**		Indiana University South Bend	South Bend, Indiana	Active	
**Iota of Pennsylvania**		Elizabethtown College	Elizabethtown, Pennsylvania	Active	
**Iota of Texas**		Southern Methodist University	Dallas, Texas	Active	
**Kappa of Texas**		Baylor University	Waco, Texas	Active	
**Nu of New York**		Adelphi University	Garden City, New York	Active	
**Xi of New York**		University at Albany, SUNY	Albany, New York	Active	
**Pi of California**		San Jose State University	San Jose, California	Active	
**Rho of California**		California State University, Bakersfield	Bakersfield, California	Active	
**Sigma of California**		Pasadena City College	Pasadena, California	Active	
Tau of California		San Francisco State University	San Francisco, California	Inactive	
**Upsilon of California**		Whittier College	Whittier, California	Active	
**Phi of California**		University of Southern California	Los Angeles, California	Active	

== See also ==
- Honor cords
- Professional fraternities and sororities
