= State Correctional Institution – Waynesburg =

Former prison in Pennsylvania, United States

Coordinates: 39.9186°N 80.1117°W

State Correctional Institution – Waynesburg was a Pennsylvania Department of Corrections minimum security prison in Morgan Township, Greene County, Pennsylvania near Waynesburg.

The property had 117 acres (47 ha) of land. As a men's prison it had 220 employees and approximately 450 prisoners.

== History ==
It opened as a minimum security women's prison in July 1984 in a former Pennsylvania Department of Public Welfare youth correctional facility. Women were transferred to SCI Cambridge Springs in 1992, and that year SCI Waynesburg became a men's prison.

Circa 2003 the yearly cost to house prisoners at Waynesburg was $32,685, while the overall Pennsylvania DOC statewide cost was $28,237 and the average cost for its medium security prisons was $21,500. The process of its closing was to begin in August 2003 and finish by some time in 2004. Basalt Trap Rock Co. bought the prison property for $990,000; Governor of Pennsylvania Ed Rendell approved the sale in July 2005.
