= State Correctional Institution – Mercer =

Prison in Pennsylvania, United States

Coordinates: 41°12′05″N 80°13′27″W

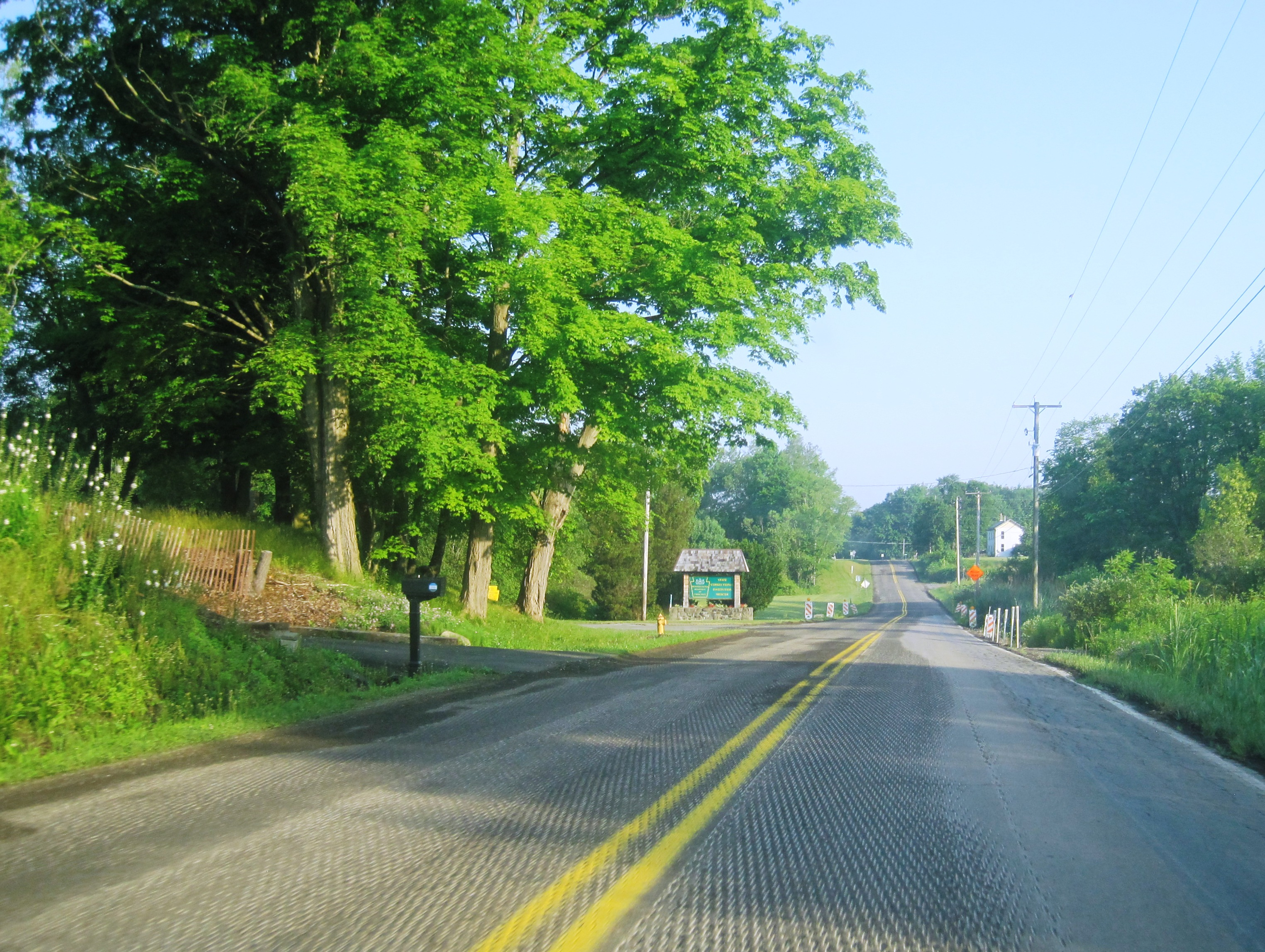
- Entrance to the facility along PA 258
- Interactive map of State Correctional Institution – Mercer
- Location: Findley Township, Mercer County, Pennsylvania, Pennsylvania
- Security class: Minimum-Security
- Capacity: 1,087
- Managed by: Pennsylvania Department of Corrections

State Correctional Institution – Mercer is a minimum-security correctional facility near Mercer in the northwestern part of the commonwealth of Pennsylvania. In December of 2025 Mercer held 1,379 inmates against a public capacity of 1,476 individuals, or 93.4%.

== History ==
Originally housing inmates from the 14 northwestern Pennsylvania counties. In 1986, the facility also accepted inmates from the southwestern 9-county region that were utilizing SCI-Greensburg. Presently, inmates from all over the commonwealth are housed at SCI Mercer.

== Physical Plant ==
There are 30 buildings on SRCF Mercer's Campus (23 inside the 37.5 acre fenced perimeter). The campus is air-conditioned (electric system). Nine diesel backup generators serve as emergency power. The institution operates its own sewage treatment plant, having a 104,000 gallon daily capacity.

== See also ==
- List of Pennsylvania state prisons
