= State Correctional Institution – Laurel Highlands =

Prison in Pennsylvania, United States

Coordinates: 40°00′16″N 79°02′27″W

State Correctional Institution - Laurel Highlands
- Interactive map of State Correctional Institution - Laurel Highlands
- Location: Somerset Township, Pennsylvania, U.S.
- Status: Open
- Security class: Minimum security
- Opened: 1996
- Former name: Somerset State Hospital
- Managed by: Pennsylvania Department of Corrections

State Correctional Institution – Laurel Highlands is a minimum-security facility in Somerset Township, Pennsylvania, about 70 miles (110 km) southeast of Pittsburgh. The prison houses minimum-security inmates, particularly geriatric and mentally ill males. In December of 2025, Laurel Highlands held 1,474 inmates against a public capacity of 1,653 individuals, or 89.2%.

== History ==
SCI – Laurel Highlands is on the campus of the former Somerset State Hospital, which closed in mid-1995. The facility was then converted into its current facility and opened in 1996.

== Notable inmates ==
- Thomas W. Druce, former Pennsylvania State Representative, convicted for leaving the scene of an accident, insurance fraud, and tampering with evidence, in the fatal killing of a 42-year-old former U.S. Marine; Druce was released in 2006.
- John du Pont, convicted in the murder of Olympic gold-medalist wrestler Dave Schultz; du Pont died in prison in 2010.
- Ira Einhorn, nicknamed The Unicorn Killer, evaded justice for over two decades before being extradited from France in 2001 to stand trial for the 1977 murder of his girlfriend Holly Maddux; Einhorn died in prison on April 2, 2020.
- George Feigley, sex cult leader and child molester
- Scott Ritter, intelligence officer and sex offender
- Jerry Sandusky, former Penn State football coach and serial child molester

== See also ==
- List of Pennsylvania state prisons
