= State Correctional Institution – Waymart =

Prison in Pennsylvania, United States

Coordinates: 41°34′28″N 75°25′45″W

State Correctional Institution - Waymart
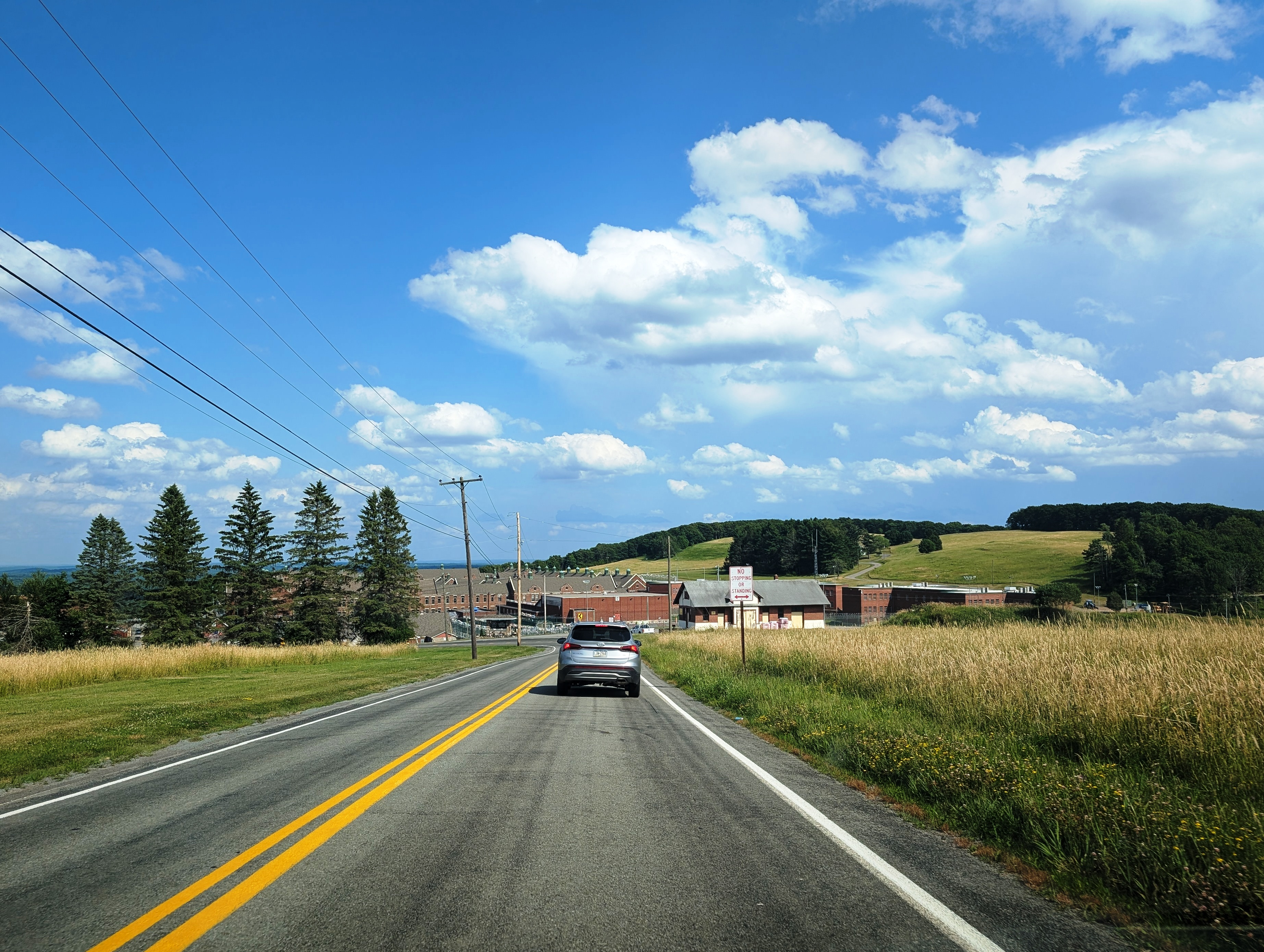
- Complex as seen from West Carbondale Road
- Interactive map of State Correctional Institution - Waymart
- Location: Canaan Township, Wayne County, Pennsylvania
- Security class: Medium-Security
- Capacity: 1,430
- Population: 1,425
- Opened: 1989
- Managed by: Pennsylvania Department of Corrections

State Correctional Institution – Waymart is a medium-security correctional facility located in Canaan Township, Wayne County, Pennsylvania, outside Waymart, in the extreme northeast corner of the commonwealth. SCI Waymart also houses a unit (Forensic Treatment Unit) for mentally disabled males needing psychiatric care and treatment. The facility is located on the site of the former Farview State Hospital.

In December of 2025, Waymart held 1,223 inmates against a public capacity of 1,462 individuals, or 83.7%.

== Farview State Hospital ==
Between 1909 and 1995 Farview State Hospital was Pennsylvania's designated facility for the "criminally insane." The hospital was known for poor conditions and endured several scandals over the course of its existence.

== Opening of SCI Waymart ==
The opening of this institution was pressed due to the 1989 riots at State Correctional Institution - Camp Hill. From the opening until 1995, the correctional facility and the still-open Farview State Hospital operated jointly, unique for the commonwealth. In 1995, the Department of Public Welfare turned over hospital operations to the Department of Corrections.

== See also ==
- List of Pennsylvania state prisons
