= State Correctional Institution – Smithfield =

Prison in Pennsylvania, United States

Coordinates: 40°29′55″N 78°02′07″W

State Correctional Institution - Smithfield
- Interactive map of State Correctional Institution - Smithfield
- Location: Smithfield Township, Huntingdon County, Pennsylvania
- Security class: Close-Security
- Capacity: 1380
- Opened: 1988
- Managed by: Pennsylvania Department of Corrections
- Website: pa.gov/agencies/cor/state-prisons/sci-smithfield

State Correctional Institution – Smithfield (SCI Smithfield) is a close-security correctional facility for men on the grounds of SCI-Huntingdon, near Huntingdon in the Allegheny Mountains. SCI Smithfield was opened in 1988 during a "growth spurt of the "bursting at the seams" correctional system in the Commonwealth of Pennsylvania.

In December of 2025, Smithfield held 1,182 inmates against a public capacity of 1,555 individuals, or 76.0%.

== Notable prisoners ==
- George Feigley, sex cult leader

== See also ==
- List of Pennsylvania state prisons
