= 2001 Red Lion machete attack =

Mass stabbing in Pennsylvania, United States

- Location: 39.84°N 76.62°W; North Hopewell-Winterstown Elementary School; Red Lion, Pennsylvania, U.S.
- Date: February 2, 2001; 25 years ago c.11:30 a.m. – c.11:48 a.m. (EST)
- Target: Elementary school students and staff
- Weapon: Machete
- Deaths: 0
- Injuries: 14
- Perpetrator: William Michael Stankewicz
- Motive: Anger against ex-wife for divorce and molestation accusations

On February 2, 2001, a machete attack took place at North Hopewell-Winterstown Elementary School in Red Lion, Pennsylvania. The perpetrator, 55-year-old William Michael Stankewicz, slashed several students and school faculty, injuring 11 kindergarteners, two teachers, and the principal.

Stankewicz was convicted and received a minimum of 132 years.

== Attack ==
On February 2, 2001, Michael Stankewicz drove from Tennessee to York County, Pennsylvania. He was armed with a 2-foot-long machete, hiding the weapon in his pantleg. Stankewicz stated that he made two stops during the trip to sharpen the machete. Initial reports incorrectly stated that Stankewicz also carried a baseball bat, based on comments by the school staff that had mistaken the machete for a bat. According to Stankewicz, he had previously tried to purchase a gun the same day, but failed a background check.

At around midday, Stankewicz entered North Hopewell-Winterstown Elementary School, bypassing the keycard entry security system by following a parent who was remotely buzzed in by a school nurse. Stankewicz was peering into a kindergarten classroom when he was confronted outside the administrative offices by the nurse and the principal. Principal Norina Bentzel variously stated that she either asked if Stankewicz was looking for someone, or that she had immediately attempted to stop him from getting closer to the class, at which point Stankewicz took out the machete and slashed Bentzel across the chest. He then entered the kindergarten class and attacked the teacher and students inside. Further attacks continue in the school's halls, the nurse's office and the principal's office. The first 911 calls came in at 11:32 a.m.

Principal Bentzel stopped the attack by jumping on Stankewicz and pinning him down. The attack lasted around 25 minutes and Stankewicz was arrested shortly before 11:48 a.m.

== Victims ==
The majority of the injured children had minor injuries and were treated at area hospitals. One child had her arm broken, while another had her ponytail cut off. All three of the adult victims were female and brought to Memorial Hospital in York, Pennsylvania, where a teacher and the principal required surgery for arm and hand injuries. Their conditions were not life-threatening.

== Perpetrator ==
William Michael Stankewicz, known as Mike Stankewicz, was a former resident of York County and employed as a history teacher in Baltimore.

Stankewicz said he attacked the victims because he was angry about the failure of his marriage six years earlier. His fourth wife, Larisa Prokuda Montgomery, a Russian-born mail-order bride from Kazakhstan, had divorced him, remarried, and alleged that he had molested his stepdaughters when they were around nine and thirteen years old. In 1996, after unsuccessfully demanding the deportation of Montgomery and her daughters, Stankewicz sent death letter threats to Montgomery, her lawyer, and a member of congress, for which he spent 2 years in federal prison. He had been living with his mother Josie Pavone in Johnson City, Tennessee, at the time of the attack.

Both of Stankewicz's former stepdaughters had previously attended North Hopewell-Winterstown, which he targeted after failing to find their new address.

== Aftermath ==
Stankewicz was charged with 39 offenses, including two counts of attempted homicide, sixteen counts of aggravated assault, and one count of having a weapon on school property. He was held on a $500,000 bond, later increased to $2,000,000. Stankewicz claimed to have no memory of the attack and variously pled guilty or no contest for the individual charges. However, he later agreed with the prosecution's claim that he committed the attack due to resentment towards his ex-wife and her daughters for the divorce and molestation allegations. During the trial, Stankewicz made several contradictory and unrelated statements, at one point calling the attack "his twin towers" and asking for the death penalty, due to which his defense argued that Stankewicz was impaired by mental illness. In November 2001, Stankewicz was sentenced to 132 to 264 years imprisonment, one of the longest prison sentences in York County history.

Norina Bentzel stated that in 2006, after the West Nickel Mines School shooting in neighboring Lancaster County, she was inspired to forgive Stankewicz for his actions, as he ultimately didn't kill anyone. At the tenth anniversary of the attack, Bentzel recalled the incident and later violent occurrences at Red Lion Elementary, such as the 2003 killing of principal Eugene "Gene" Segro by a 14-year-old student in a murder-suicide and a 2005 stabbing in a tenth-grade classroom. Bentzel sent a letter extending forgiveness to Stankewicz, who refused to read its contents.

In a December 2010 letter from prison, Stankewict declared to have no remorse for his actions, instead blaming his ex-wife and United States immigration officials and congressmen for the attack and declaring himself a "victim". In a 2017 statement, Stankewicz described the stabbing as a "wee bit o’revenge" and denied his previous defense of mental illness, saying that he had acted out of boredom and anger while also "hop[ing] to be remembered in [York] County forever".

On November 27, 2023, Stankewicz was found unresponsive in his cell at the State Correctional Institution – Dallas and was subsequently declared dead. He was 78.

In July 2024, Bentzel published a memoir about the machete attack, describing Stankewicz's motives and repeating that she forgave Stankewicz for his actions. The book, Glorious Sadness – Faith-Love-Hope Trumps School Attack, was awarded the Delta Kappa Gamma International Society Educator's Book Award in July 2025.

== See also ==
- Wolverhampton machete attack
