= Adam Leroy Lane =

American murderer (1964-)

- Booking photo in 2008
- Born: August 7, 1964 (age 62); Jonesville, North Carolina, United States
- Other name: The Highway Killer
- Spouses: Miriam M. Benge (div. 1993): Regina Lane
- Children: 3
- Convictions: 1 count of assault; 2 counts of murder; 3 counts of attempted murder
- Penalty: 25–30 years for assault in Massachusetts; 50 years for murder in New Jersey; 10–20 years for attempted murder; Life imprisonment for murder in Pennsylvania

Details
- Victims: 2 killed, 3 survived
- Span of crimes: July 13 – July 30, 2007
- Country: United States
- States: Pennsylvania, New Jersey, Massachusetts
- Date apprehended: 30 July 2007
- Imprisoned at: State Correctional Institution, Fayette County, Pennsylvania

Adam Leroy Lane (born August 7, 1964) is a convicted murderer and suspected serial killer who was dubbed the Highway Killer because his crimes took place near highways, which he frequently traveled due to his job as a truck driver.

== Murders ==
Lane was born on August 7, 1964, in Jonesville, North Carolina. He dropped out of high school and later acquired a job as a truck driver and occasional chicken-plant worker. He lived in a trailer with his wife and three daughters.

Lane committed the murders while he made his way through the Northeastern United States during the summer of 2007. He had a DVD in his truck of the 2002 horror film Hunting Humans, about a serial killer who stalks his victims before killing them with a knife. He also carried two large hunting knives, choke wire, and a leather mask with the eyes and mouth cut out.

His first known victim was 42-year-old Darlene Ewalt, who was attacked in her home in suburban West Hanover Township, Dauphin County, near Harrisburg, Pennsylvania. She was stabbed and killed at around 2 a.m. on July 13, 2007. At the time, she was on her patio talking on the telephone. Lane slit her throat and stabbed her to death with a long knife while her family was inside the house.

Lane's second victim was a woman named Patricia Brooks, whom he stabbed on July 17, 2007, in Conewago Township, in rural York County, Pennsylvania, as she was sleeping on her couch. She survived.

His third victim, 38-year-old Monica Massaro, was killed in the bedroom of her duplex in Bloomsbury, New Jersey. Lane cut her throat and stabbed her in the head, neck, and chest, one day before he was to commit his final crime.

His final crime transpired on July 30, 2007, when he made a stop on I-495 in Chelmsford, Massachusetts. Clad entirely in black and wearing a mask and gloves, Lane broke into a house and attacked 15-year-old Shea McDonough with a 15-inch hunting knife. Her parents, Jeannie and Kevin McDonough, awoke at 4 a.m. to the sounds of her struggling. Her 135-pound mother and 160-pound father were able to subdue the 245-pound Lane and get ahold of the knife, though the mother suffered knife cuts. Chelmsford Police were summoned and arrested Lane at the scene, where he was being held in a wrestling headlock by Kevin McDonough.

While Lane's extensive trucking routes led some in law enforcement to speculate that he was responsible for additional murders in other parts of the country, this has not been proven. He has refused to comment on such speculation either publicly or to authorities.

== Investigation ==
Lane was linked to the Ewalt murder by DNA on his knife. He was linked to the Brooks murder similarly. Police also discovered gloves with his DNA and one of his victim's blood.

== Trials and imprisonment ==
Lane received a 25–30-year sentence in Massachusetts for the attack on Shea McDonough.

New Jersey sentenced him to 50 years for the murder of Monica Massaro.

In Pennsylvania, Lane pleaded guilty in order to avoid the death penalty. He was sentenced to 10–20 years for the attempted murder of the woman in York County, and to life for the murder of Darlene Ewalt. He is serving his sentences in State Correctional Institution – Fayette.

== In the media ==
The story has been presented in the Dateline NBC series (original air date August 3, 2009) and the 48 Hours Mystery episode, "Live to Tell: Hunting Humans" (original air date February 26, 2011). The case was also featured in episode 2, season 2, of Nightmare Next Door and episode 5, season 7, of Castle.

In 2013 Shea McDonough told her story in a documentary titled I Survived A Serial Killer.

Also, it was featured in Reader's Digest July 2011 in an article entitled "Caught in the Act." Also in season 1 of The Coroner: I Speak for the Dead, episode 2 titled "Call the Coroner" (original air date July 25, 2016).
