= Harold Haulman =

American serial killer

- Haulman 2025 Mugshot
- Born: Harold David Haulman III; November 28, 1978 (age 47); Michigan, U.S.
- Other name: "Dave"
- Convictions: Germany; Manslaughter; Michigan; First degree murder Pennsylvania; First degree murder (2 counts)
- Penalty: Germany; 6 years and 3 months imprisonment Michigan; 37.5 to 60 years imprisonment Pennsylvania; Life imprisonment

Details
- Victims: 4+
- Span of crimes: 1999–2020
- Country: Germany, United States
- States: Rhineland-Palatinate, Michigan, Pennsylvania
- Date apprehended: For the final time on December 27, 2020
- Imprisoned at: State Correctional Institution – Frackville

Harold David Haulman III (born November 28, 1978) is an American serial killer. Originally convicted for the murder of a fellow countryman in Germany in 1999, he was paroled and returned to the United States, where he murdered at least three women in Michigan and Pennsylvania from 2005 to 2020.

Haulman confessed to all the latter murders and pleaded guilty to all of them, receiving life terms or long sentences for each of them.

== Early life and first murder ==
Harold David Haulman III was born in Michigan on November 28, 1978. Very little is known about his early life. In the mid-1990s, his family moved to Ramstein-Miesenbach, Germany, where his father was stationed as a civilian technician at the Ramstein Air Base. Haulman got into an argument with his father in the late 1990s, after which his father resigned from the air base, left Germany and moved to Turkey. Following his father's departure, Haulman lived at his girlfriend's house for some time, but was forced to leave when their relationship ended in early 1999.

Left homeless, he lived for several months in the woods between the city and the air base, where he slept in a dugout. For income, Haulman resorted to doing odd jobs and occasional petty thefts. On June 5, 1999, aged 20, he was arrested on a petty theft charge, but surprised investigators when he confessed to killing 21-year-old Joseph Lawrence "Jay" Whitehurst, the son of an Air Force colonel, on May 30. Haulman said that he had met him several times at several bars in Ramstein-Miesenbach, and according to him, they spent the night drinking together at a bar on May 29. On the following morning, the two went to a nearby park and lit a campfire. He then said that an intoxicated Whitehurst started erratically running around and dancing, causing him to strike him on the head with a club. Whitehurst succumbed to his head injury not long after, and his body, which had been covered up with leaves, was found three days later near the air base.

Haulman was charged with manslaughter. Under German law, a person under the age of 21 can be tried in juvenile court. At trial, he told the court that he committed the murder because he felt threatened by Whitehurst as he ran and danced around the campfire. Haulman's attorneys petitioned for a forensic psychiatric examination, which found him sane, even though psychiatrists had concluded that he suffered from early symptoms of schizophrenia. In late 1999, Haulman pleaded guilty on all counts and faced ten years imprisonment, the maximum sentence in juvenile courts in Germany. Zweibrucken court showed Haulman leniency because of a 'diminished mental state' (paranoid schizophrenia), sentencing him to six years at a German reform school. After serving three years, Haulman was granted parole. He returned to the US.

=== Return to the USA ===
Following his return to the United States, Haulman settled in Battle Creek, Michigan, where some of his relatives lived. He soon found lodging and work as a truck driver, but left Battle Creek in 2009 and began to travel around the country. Between 2009 and 2020, Haulman changed several places of residence, he lived in Pennsylvania, California, Illinois and Maryland. In the 2010s, he married a woman named Ann, but they split up in 2013 because she did not want to participate in his bondage fantasies. From then onwards, Haulman began dating women he met through online dating sites.

== Exposure ==
=== Investigation and first confession ===
On December 27, 2020, Haulman was arrested in Butler Township, Pennsylvania on charges of murdering 26-year-old Erica G. Shultz, who had gone missing on December 4 and whose corpse was discovered in the early morning hours of December 27 in the nearby woods. He was then lodged in the Luzerne County Jail to await trial. According to relatives, Shultz was autistic and susceptible to manipulation, having gone missing after leaving her apartment in Bloomsburg to go to work.

During the investigation, an examination of Shultz and Haulman's cellphone billing data revealed that Haulman was at the murdered girl's apartment on the evening of December 4, after which they went on a trip. The last recorded data on Shultz's phone was registered in Pennsylvania in the early morning hours of December 6, after which it was turned off or destroyed. On December 23, FBI agents contacted and questioned Haulman about the disappearance while installing a GPS tracker on his van without his knowledge. Haulman insisted he had nothing to do with it, and since no body had been found at the time, he was not apprehended.

The day after the interrogation, Haulman disconnected his phones and fled. On December 26, the GPS tracker placed him on the outskirts of Duncannon, where he attempted to commit suicide near some railroad tracks by slashing his wrists with a box cutter. Before he could bleed out, however, he was found by a railroad worker and taken to the Geisinger Holy Spirit Hospital in Camp Hill. After receiving appropriate treatment, Haulman was re-interviewed by the FBI agents and subsequently admitted to killing Shultz.

Haulman stated that in the early morning hours of December 6, he and Shultz arrived in Butler Township and went into the woods between I-80 and I-81, where he ordered her out of the car, assaulted her and then struck her 12 times on the head with a mallet-type hammer. He claimed that she was still alive at that point, prompting him to stab her 12 times with a knife, killing her. He then requested that he be provided with access to Google Maps, which he used to indicate where he had dumped Shultz's body, as well as where he disposed of the murder weapon.

== Further confessions ==
=== Tianna Phillips ===
In May 2021, Haulman confessed to another murder - this one being the June 13, 2018, killing of 25-year-old Tianna Ann Phillips, who had gone missing from Berwick after an argument with her boyfriend. Haulman stated that he often dated women he met online using the alias "Dave", and that his wife, Anne, knew about his affairs. When questioned, Anne confirmed his testimony and admitted that she had knowledge that her husband was a murderer. As for the murder itself, Haulman said that he went on a date with Phillips, driving her to the same area where he murdered Shultz two years later. After assaulting her, he bludgeoned and stabbed her multiple times, then took photographs of the corpse and showed them to his wife, who did not contact the police. The pair then went to the crime scene, where Harold placed the clothing and skeletonized remains in a black plastic bag and then left them in a dumpster near the AMC Classic Bloomsburg II movie theater in Scott Township. At one point, Anne said that Phillips' boyfriend - who knew that she was dating other men - called him on the phone, after which Haulman got angry and threatened to kill them both. Based on these testimonies, authorities charged Haulman with Phillips' murder, despite the fact her remains were never found.

=== Ashley Parlier ===
A few days later, Haulman confessed to yet another murder, this one being the June 12, 2005, murder of 21-year-old Ashley Marie Parlier in Battle Creek, Michigan. According to family members, Parlier ran away from home after an argument with her parents and never returned. Supposedly, Parlier had recently found out she was pregnant, but this could not be corroborated. Haulman stated during questioning that he had been intimate with her and suspected that he was the child's father. He said that on the day of her murder, he drove Parlier to a remote area of Newton Township, a few miles south of Battle Creek, where he struck her on the head with a log after a short argument. He claimed to have left her body in the woods, but returned two months later to check if it had been found - to his relief, there were only skeletal remains left.

Following his confession, Haulman was extradited to Michigan and attempted to locate Parlier's remains, but was unsuccessful in doing so. Nevertheless, he was indicted by the Calhoun County Prosecutor's Office for her murder.

=== Motive ===
To this day, Haulman has refused to give exact motives for the murders. During interviews with news media, he stated that he had lied to Ramstein-Miesenbach police regarding Whitehurst's murder, claiming that he had instead killed him because "[he] wanted to see what it was like to kill someone". Additionally, he described that killing people was a pleasure that made him feel a way that no drug ever could.

== Trial, guilty pleas, and imprisonment ==
In August 2021, Haulman accepted a plea deal with Luzerne County prosecutors - in exchange for pleading guilty to the murders of Phillips and Shultz, they would not pursue the death penalty. As a result, he was instead sentenced to life imprisonment without the chance of parole. At the sentencing, he maintained complete equanimity, expressed no remorse for his actions and refused to address the court. Following his sentencing, he was transferred to Calhoun County, Michigan, to stand trial for Parlier's murder.

Haulman's trial began on December 14, 2022. On February 1, 2023, he pleaded guilty to killing Parlier. Haulman was sentenced to 60 years imprisonment with a chance of parole after serving 37 years and 6 months of his sentence.

== See also ==
- John Getreu – another American serial killer who committed additional murders after serving time for a killing committed in Germany
- List of serial killers in the United States
- List of serial killers active in the 2020s
- List of murder convictions without a body
