= Somerset State Hospital =

- State of Pennsylvania

Geography
- Location: Somerset Township, Somerset County, Pennsylvania, United States
- Coordinates: 40.009742°N 79.083951°W (approximate)

Organization
- Type: State Mental Health Hospital

Helipads
- Helipad: No

History
- Founded: 1938
- Closed: 1995

Links
- Lists: Hospitals in Pennsylvania
- Other links: Pennsylvania State Hospitals

Somerset State Hospital was a Pennsylvania State Mental Health Hospital, located outside Somerset, about 70 miles east of Pittsburgh. The hospital, closed in 1995, was converted into a minimum-security correctional facility housing older males with geriatric/mentally challenging issues.

== See also ==
- State Correctional Institution – Laurel Highlands
