= SCI Albion =

State prison in Pennsylvania

Coordinates: 41°52′43″N 80°21′48″W

State Correctional Institution - Albion
- Interactive map of State Correctional Institution - Albion
- Location: Conneaut Township, Erie County, Pennsylvania
- Security class: Medium-Security, Close-Security
- Capacity: 2,152
- Population: 2,274 (June 30, 2015)
- Opened: 1993
- Managed by: Pennsylvania Department of Corrections

State Correctional Institution – Albion is a Medium-Security correctional facility for males, located in the extreme northwestern corner of the commonwealth of Pennsylvania in Erie County. SCI-Albion also holds Close-Security inmates as well.

== History ==
SCI Albion was a prototype of four other similar correctional facilities constructed in the 1990s. Funding for construction was unique at the time as the Department of General Services joined Erie County to construct this facility. The county had a prison authority to float the bond Issues and authorize payments. The Commonwealth pays for the indebtedness via a monthly payment to the county.

== Facility ==
SCI Albion covers a 357-acre area, with 67 of those acres within the perimeter fence. The grounds also include 22 structures, including the prison's ten (10) housing units. Housing consists of both cells and dormitory-style housing. A Special Needs Unit (SNU) and Residential Treatment Unit (RTU) at SCI Albion are present.

=== Capacity/demographics ===
As of April 30, 2022, 1,999 males were incarcerated at SCI-Albion, within a stated capacity of 2,191. The institution employs 533.

== Inmate support ==
=== Education ===
- Through GED Level
- Vocational education courses in Business Practices, Computer Technology, Custodial Maintenance, Warehouse/Material Handling, Environment

=== Inmate support groups ===
- Family/relationship self
- Sex offenders
- Alcohol and other drug (AOD)
- Offense-related
- Mental health
- RTU (Residential Treatment Unit) Groups
- (Five others)

== Other programs ==
- Virtual Visitation
- Correctional Industries - Commissary Distribution Center, which processes, packs and ships food orders to other prisons and employs 90 inmates
- Community Work Program - Inmates contributed 6,783 hours of community work in 2012 for an estimated savings to the community of $169,575.

== See also ==
- List of Pennsylvania state prisons
