= State Correctional Institution – Benner Township =

Prison in Centre County, Pennsylvania, USA

Coordinates: 40.859221°N 77.778106°W

- Interactive map of State Correctional Institution – Benner Township
- Location: Benner Township, Pennsylvania, U.S.
- Security class: Medium-Security, Close-Security
- Capacity: 2,250
- Population: 1,427 (December 31, 2025)
- Opened: April 15, 2013
- Managed by: Pennsylvania Department of Corrections

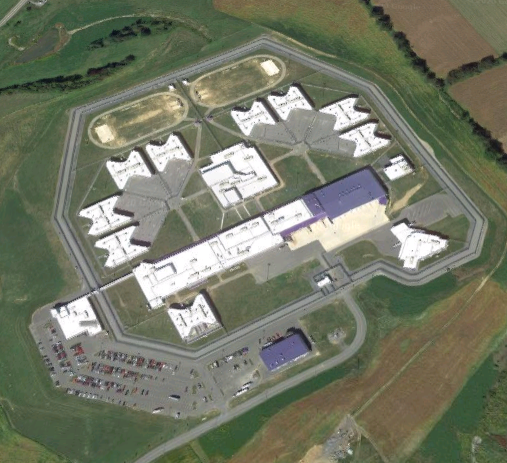
SCI Benner Township overhead view

State Correctional Institution – Benner Township, commonly referred to as SCI Benner, is a Medium-Security correctional facility for males located in Benner Township, Centre County, Pennsylvania. It is one of twenty six state-level correctional institutions of the Pennsylvania Department of Corrections System. SCI Benner sits adjacent to SCI Rockview.

== History ==
The construction of SCI Benner was approved with the passage of the 2008 Capital Budget. Groundbreaking was held in August 2009, and in March 2011, the first footer was in place. The contractor was Hensel Phelps. Costing $200 million to construct, the prison consists of 46 acres inside the perimeter's fence and 589,492 square footage under roof. An addition of a 50,000 Correctional Industries laundry facility is planned, bringing the building count to 26. The prison accepted its first inmates on April 15, 2013.

== Capacity ==
In December of 2025, Benner held 1,427 inmates against a public capacity of 2,250 individuals, or 63.4%.

== See also ==
- List of Pennsylvania state prisons
