= State Correctional Institution – Greensburg =

Former prison in Pennsylvania, United States

Coordinates: 40°16′08″N 79°33′50″W

State Correctional Institution - Greensburg
- Interactive map of State Correctional Institution - Greensburg
- Location: Hempfield Township, Westmoreland County, Pennsylvania
- Security class: Medium-Security
- Opened: June 2, 1969
- Closed: June 30, 2013
- Managed by: Pennsylvania Department of Corrections

State Correctional Institution – Greensburg was a Medium-Security prison, holding all male inmates. The facility is located directly off of U.S. Route 119 in Hempfield Township, about five miles South of downtown Greensburg. The institution is located about 30 miles east of Pittsburgh, in the western part of the commonwealth of Pennsylvania.

On January 8, 2013, state officials announced the prison would be closed. It officially closed June 30, 2013.

== History ==
This facility opened to prisoners on June 2, 1969, as the first regional correctional facility in Pennsylvania, only housing short-term offenders from a 9-county area of the western part of the commonwealth, due to the age and overcrowding in county facilities. Due to a greater need for long-term inmates in the commonwealth, a Governor's proclamation on May 1, 1986, re-designated the regional facility to its current status, so inmates across the state could be accepted at Greensburg.

The prison is also the birthplace of the dough used at Down North, a pizzeria in Strawberry Mansion, Philadelphia that was founded to combat recidivism and help their community find well-paying jobs for ex-convicts.

== See also ==
- List of Pennsylvania State Prisons
