= State Correctional Institution – Huntingdon =

Prison in Pennsylvania, United States

Coordinates: 40°29′28″N 78°01′44″W

State Correctional Institution at Huntingdon
- Interactive map of State Correctional Institution at Huntingdon
- Location: Smithfield Township, Huntingdon County, Pennsylvania, US
- Security class: Close security
- Opened: 1889
- Managed by: Pennsylvania Department of Corrections
- Website: pa.gov/agencies/cor/state-prisons/sci-huntingdon

The State Correctional Institution at Huntingdon (SCI Huntingdon) is a close-security correctional facility for men in Huntingdon County, Pennsylvania, in the Appalachian Mountains. SCI Huntingdon is the oldest state correctional facility in continuous operation in the Commonwealth of Pennsylvania. In December of 2025, Huntingdon held 1,854 inmates against a public capacity of 2,306 individuals, or 80.4%.

== History ==
The facility was opened in 1889 and was modeled after the Elmira Reformatory in New York and was called the Huntingdon Reformatory for Young Offenders. SCI Huntingdon was used for "defective delinquents" until 1960, after that it became a maximum-security prison, housing Capital Case inmates until 1995. SCI Huntingdon is now a close-security institution.

== Notable inmates ==
- George Feigley, sex cult leader, served part of his sentence at SCI- Huntingdon, from 1983 to 1998.
- Kermit Gosnell, abortion provider and convicted child murderer
- Joseph Kallinger, who had initially been held at the state prison at Huntingdon until he attacked another inmate with a razor-studded belt.
- William Dean Christensen, serial killer known as "America's Jack the Ripper".
- Norman Johnston Escaped from SCI-Huntingdon August 2, 1999 and was captured three weeks later. He was convicted for the 1978 murders of four teenagers to cover up a family burglary ring which were portrayed in the film "At Close Range" starring Sean Penn.
- Cosmo Dinardo, 20-year-old serial killer that murdered four young men on his family's 90 acre Solebury Township farm in 2017
- Luigi Mangione, held at SCI-Huntingdon while awaiting his hearing for extradition to New York.
- Subramanyam Vedam, held at SCI Huntington for over 40 years before being exonerated.

== See also ==
- List of Pennsylvania state prisons
- State Correctional Institution - Smithfield
