= State Correctional Institution – Chester =

Prison in Chester, Pennsylvania, United States

Coordinates: 39°51′04″N 75°21′05″W

State Correctional Institution - Chester
- Interactive map of State Correctional Institution - Chester
- Location: Chester, Pennsylvania, U.S.
- Security class: Medium-Security
- Capacity: 1,288
- Population: 1,142 (December 31, 2025)
- Opened: April, 1998
- Managed by: Pennsylvania Department of Corrections

State Correctional Institution – Chester (SCI Chester) is a medium-security, all-male correctional facility in Chester, Pennsylvania, United States, within the Philadelphia metropolitan area.

== History of SCI-Chester ==
SCI Chester, constructed as a 1,175 bed medium-security prison for inmates with a documented substance abuse history was constructed for nearly $74 million with an annual operating budget of $36 million.

SCI Chester is the 24th state correctional institution to open in the Commonwealth of Pennsylvania and is unique in its architectural structure and programmatic design. The housing units design - pods - was considered an ambitious move for correctional facilities during the 1980s. In addition to its structure and program focus, it is the first tobacco free facility in the commonwealth.

== Facility Makeup ==
SCI Chester is 13.77 acres in size, with 9 acres being inside the perimeter fence. There is a total of 10 buildings on campus, all but one is on the inside of the fence. SCI Chester housing complement contains 14 housing units, all containing cell-style housing.

== Facility Capacity and Demographics ==
The average age of an inmate at SCI Chester is 38 and the prison employs 399 full-time staff. In December 2025, Chester held 1,142 inmates against a public capacity of 1,288 individuals, or 88.7%.

== Inmate Supports ==
There are several Supports at SCI Chester, including:

=== Academic programs ===
- Basic Education Classes
- Literacy/Basic Skills
- Adult Basic Education
- G.E.D. Classes
- English as a Second Language (E.S.L.)
- Inside-Out Program

=== Vocational Programs ===
The following vocational programs are offered to inmates at SCI Chester.

- Barber School
- Carpentry
- HVAC Program (Heating Ventilation and Air Conditioning)

=== Counseling Services ===
- Alternative to Violence
- Sex Offenders Programming

== Substance Abuse Treatment Programs ==
The treatment program at SCI Chester is a collaborative effort between the Pennsylvania Department of Corrections and Gaudenzia, Inc. This collaboration has been formed to rehabilitate inmates with a history of substance abuse. The treatment program is operated by Gaudenzia (a not-for-profit organization) which has been providing addiction and correctional treatment services to offenders in Pennsylvania for more than 30 years.

The treatment program utilizes several levels of care to accommodate the treatment needs of the inmates. The following levels of care are utilized:

=== Therapeutic Communities (TC's) ===
Each TC housing unit houses approximately 64 inmates. There are currently six TC sites in operation:

- Five General Population TC pods – four-month programming
- One Hispanic TC pod (program signage and language conducted entirely in Spanish) – four-month programming

=== Ancillary Services ===
Gaudenzia provides ancillary groups to provide services to those inmates who have special needs. These programs include:

- "Violence Prevention" (Moderate Intensity – four months and High Intensity – six months) and
- "Batterers' Intervention" – a specific therapy group for domestic violence-related offenders.

== "Little Scandinavia" unit ==
The "Little Scandinavia" prison project is an ongoing research project being conducted in SCI Chester by the Pennsylvania Department of Corrections (PADOC), the Norwegian Correctional Service, the Swedish Prison and Probation Service, Drexel University and the University of Oslo. The purpose of the project is according to PADOC to "incorporate ideas and concepts from Scandinavian prisons to determine their impact on staff and inmate wellness, prison culture, and recidivism." The project incentivizes humane treatment over punishment, with focus on rehabilitation. The inmates in the Little Scandinavia department have individual prison cells, are allowed to cook their own food with ingredients they order, and wear clothes with more comforting colors, among other things. The guards are also incentivized to form closer relationships with the inmates, aimed at providing a better environment for both.

The project started with Norwegian prison officials visiting SCI Chester in 2017, which was followed by DOC officials visiting several Scandinavian prisons in 2019. SCI Chester began reconstructing unit Charlie Alpha in the fall of 2019 to incorporate some of the concepts the DOC officials were presented with during their trip to Scandinavia. The unit is designed to house 64 men, and a pilot program with 6 men was started in 2020, but the project was then put on hold for two years because of the COVID-19 pandemic. The unit was officially opened on 5 May 2022 with a ribbon cutting ceremony.

The Swedish national broadcaster (SVT) is producing a documentary about this project, which as of 1 October 2022 has been partially pre-released by one of its producers.

== See also ==
- List of Pennsylvania state prisons
