= John Getreu =

American serial killer (1944–2023)

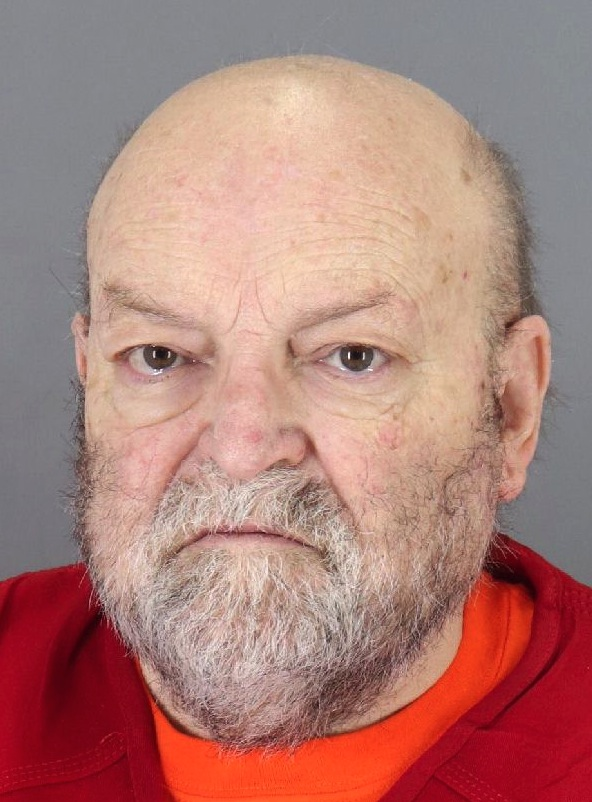
- Getreu in 2021
- Born: John Arthur Getreu; August 26, 1944; Newark, Ohio, U.S.
- Died: September 22, 2023 (aged 79); Stockton, California, U.S.
- Spouses: Susan Getreu (m. 1970; div. 1978) Lynda Getreu (m. 1978; died 2003)
- Children: 2
- Convictions: Rape, murder (1963); Statutory rape, Santa Clara County (1975); First-degree murder (2021); First-degree murder (2023)
- Penalty: Rape, murder sentence (as juvenile): 10 years (1963), served: 5 years Statutory rape sentence: 6 months (1975), served: 6 months First-degree murder sentence: 7 years to life (2021); First-degree murder sentence: 7 years to life (2023)

Details
- Victims: 3+
- Span of crimes: 1963–1975
- Country: West Germany, United States
- States: Rhineland-Palatinate, California
- Date apprehended: November 20, 2018

John Arthur Getreu (August 26, 1944 – September 22, 2023) was an American serial killer who was convicted of one murder in 1963 in West Germany and convicted of two more that took place in 1973 and 1974 in the United States. He was sentenced to life imprisonment for the latter murders, and died at the California Health Care Facility while serving his sentence. He was identified through genetic genealogy by CeCe Moore in 2018.

== Early life ==
John Arthur Getreu was born on August 26, 1944, in Newark, Ohio, one of four children born to Army serviceman Charles J. Getreu. Due to his position in the military, the Getreu family frequently traveled between bases both in the U.S. and abroad, having lived in Japan, Hawaii and North Carolina. In 1960, Charles was transferred to West Germany for his military service, moving to the town of Bad Kreuznach with his family. John spent his teen years there, attending Bad Kreuznach American High School, where the children of other American servicemen also attended.

=== First murder ===
On the evening of June 8, 1963, just before graduation, 18-year-old Getreu attended a school disco, where he met 15-year-old Margaret L. Williams, the daughter of an Army chaplain. After the dance ended, Getreu took her to the campus' baseball field, where he assaulted, raped and beat her. Williams suffered a severe head injury, and later died from complications.

As the pair had been seen by multiple witnesses, Getreu became the prime suspect and was almost immediately arrested. While he initially denied meeting her at all, Getreu later admitted under questioning that he had had sexual intercourse with Williams, but still denied killing her. In June 1964, Getreu was found guilty on all counts and sentenced to 10 years' imprisonment, the maximum sentence available under West German law at the time. (Note: Under West German law, people under the age of 21 were considered juveniles.) After his sentencing, Getreu expressed apparent remorse for his crime and apologized to the victim's family members.

== Release and return to the United States ==
After serving more than six years in prison, Getreu was paroled and released. He left West Germany and returned to the United States, settling in Reno, Nevada. He married a woman named Susan, and shortly after the wedding, the couple moved to Palo Alto, California, where they lived from 1971 to 1975.

During this period, having no education, Getreu was forced to make a living as a low-skilled laborer in jobs varying from a security guard, carpenter and laboratory technician at Mills Hospital. In the mid-1970s, Getreu joined the Boy Scouts of America and got a job as a counselor, organizing camps and camping trips in his spare time.

In 1975, he was charged with sexually abusing a 17-year-old female Explorer Scout and later convicted. Some charges were dropped after a mutual agreement was reached between Getreu and the victim. As a result, he received a minor prison sentence and an administrative fine. Susan divorced him following his conviction. In 1978, Getreu remarried, this time to a woman named Lynda.

After the second marriage, he returned to Newark, Ohio, had two children, and became involved in business activities. Getreu showed no signs of mental illness or suspicious behavior, and was generally well-regarded by those around him. In the late 1980s, Getreu left Ohio and moved back to California, this time settling in Alameda County.

In 2003, his second wife died from cancer. In 2008, he married for a third time. He soon joined the Fremont Elks Lodge, a patriotic fraternal order, where he held the position of Exalted Ruler. In this position, he was responsible for supervising duties of the members.

== Discovery of murders ==
On November 20, 2018, Getreu was arrested at his home in Hayward for the murder of 21-year-old Leslie Marie Perlov, a Stanford University graduate and law firm employee who went missing from Palo Alto on February 13, 1973.

Perlov's fully clothed corpse, showing signs of sexual assault and being strangled with her own scarf, was discovered on February 16, 1973, along the Stanford Dish hiking trail. The initial investigation failed to identify the culprit, and the case remained cold until 2018, when authorities contacted researchers from Parabon NanoLabs to conduct DNA testing. Seminal fluids found on Perlov's body were isolated, and a genotypic profile of the killer was soon developed. In the fall of 2018, Getreu was identified as the source of the seminal fluid and arrested.

On May 16, 2019, following additional testing of his DNA, Getreu was charged with another murder: that of 21-year-old Janet Ann Taylor, a Cañada College student who was found raped and strangled on March 24, 1974. She was last seen on campus grounds attempting to hitchhike back to her home in La Honda. Her body was discovered the following day in a roadside ditch in Woodside near Sand Hill Road and Manzanita Way. Janet Taylor was the daughter of Chuck Taylor, a famous coach and retired football player who, at the time of his daughter's death, held an administrative position with the Stanford University soccer team.

=== Other accusations ===
Following his identification, there were immediate suspicions that Getreu had been involved in other violent crimes. A woman named Sharon Lucchese alleged that he had attempted to kill her back in 1969. In February 2022, journalist Grace Kahng alleged that she and her several investigators had identified Getreu as the possible killer of 15-year-old Theresa Smith, who was murdered at her home in Newark, Ohio, in 1980. No charges were filed in either case.

== Trial and imprisonment ==
In late 2021, Getreu's trial for the murder of Janet Taylor began in San Mateo County and lasted three weeks. On September 15, Getreu was found guilty on all counts by jury verdict and sentenced to life imprisonment without the chance of parole. He was then transferred to Santa Clara County, where he was to stand trial for the murder of Perlov.

Due to his failing health, the trial was suspended, and Getreu was admitted to a prison hospital to undergo treatment. It resumed in late 2022, but the 78-year-old Getreu was forced to attend court proceedings from his hospital room via video link. On January 10, 2023, he pleaded guilty to the murder of Perlov, admitting that he had killed her after she resisted his attempts to rape her. He was later sentenced to an additional term of life imprisonment without the chance of parole.

== Death ==
On September 26, 2023, it was reported that Getreu had died in prison four days prior. No cause of death was specified.

== See also ==
- Harold Haulman – another American serial killer who committed additional murders after serving time for a killing committed in Germany
- List of serial killers in the United States
