= State Correctional Institution – Pine Grove =

Prison in Pennsylvania, United States

Coordinates: 40.647841°N 79.099877°W

- Interactive map of State Correctional Institution – Pine Grove
- Location: 189 Fyock Rd, Indiana, Pennsylvania 15701
- Status: Open
- Capacity: 1,196 (February 2018)
- Population: 1,113 (February 2018)
- Opened: January 9, 2001
- Managed by: Pennsylvania Department of Corrections
- Director: mark brothers
- Governor: Josh Shapiro
- Website: SCI Pine Grove

The State Correctional Institution – Pine Grove is a Pennsylvania state prison located in White Township, Indiana County, Pennsylvania. The prison contains 19 buildings including 8 housing units. In December of 2025, Pine Grove held 888 inmates against a public capacity of 1,137 individuals, or 78.1%.

Ground breaking for SCI Pine Grove occurred on May 11, 1998. The first inmates arrived on January 9, 2001. The prison cost $71 million and "emphasizes treatment and education". The prison runs the young offenders program and houses some of Pennsylvania's youngest inmates. 40% of the population is under 20. The average age is 38 years old. The prison temporarily held Jordan Brown when he was 12 years old.

On August 17, 2017, inmate Arthur Charles Martin, was found dead in his cell. He was serving time for a drug conviction.

On January 11, 2018, inmate Jeremy R. Smith was accused of assaulting four guards in the kitchen area.

== See also ==
- List of Pennsylvania state prisons
