= State Correctional Institution – Mahanoy =

Prison in Pennsylvania, United States

Coordinates: 40°47′34″N 76°10′50″W

State Correctional Institution - Mahanoy
- Interactive map of State Correctional Institution - Mahanoy
- Location: Mahanoy Township, Schuylkill County, Pennsylvania
- Security class: Medium-security
- Capacity: 1,000
- Opened: July 1993
- Managed by: Pennsylvania Department of Corrections

State Correctional Institution – Mahanoy is a 1,000-cell, all-male, medium-security correctional facility located along Interstate 81 in Mahanoy Township, Schuylkill County, Pennsylvania. In December of 2025, Mahanoy held 2,277 inmates against a public capacity of 2,520 individuals, or 90.4%.

== Construction of SCI-Mahanoy ==
Mahanoy was one of four 1,000-bed medium-security correctional facilities constructed in Pennsylvania around the same time. The facility cost $117 million to construct and is on a 222-acre tract of land that was originally leased by the county commissioners. Construction began in July 1991 and the prison opened two years later.

== Notable inmates ==
- Mumia Abu-Jamal, convicted of the murder of Daniel Faulkner
- Mark Canty, convicted in the murder of Lauretha Vaird
- David Freeman, convicted in the Freeman family murders
- Joshua Komisarjevsky, convicted in the Cheshire, Connecticut, home invasion murders

== See also ==
- List of Pennsylvania state prisons
