= State Correctional Institution – Fayette =

Maximum-security prison located in Fayette County, Pennsylvania

Coordinates: 40°00′02″N 79°59′17″W

State Correctional Institution at Fayette
- Interactive map of State Correctional Institution at Fayette
- Location: Luzerne Township, Fayette County, near Centerville, Washington County, Pennsylvania
- Status: Open
- Security class: Maximum security
- Capacity: 2,034
- Opened: September 2003
- Managed by: Pennsylvania Department of Corrections
- Warden: Mark Capozza
- Website: pa.gov/agencies/cor/state-prisons/sci-fayette

The State Correctional Institution at Fayette is a 2,000 bed maximum-security prison for men located in a remote section of Fayette County, Pennsylvania, in the United States. The prison is located southeast of Pittsburgh and was built to replace two institutions (SCI-Waynesburg and SCI-Pittsburgh) to make the Commonwealth's prison system more energy-efficient. It is the only prison in the Commonwealth where Pennsylvania license plates are manufactured, holding that distinction since 2003.

In December 2025, Fayette held 2,032 inmates against a public capacity of 2,372 individuals, or 85.7%.

== Construction of SCI-Fayette ==
The $125 million, 238-acre (96 ha) facility was constructed on land that was formerly the site of one of the largest coal operations in the world, where coal from nearby mines was washed and shipped away. The institution covers 692,000 square feet (64,300 m^{2}) under roof and 53 acres (21 ha) within the perimeter fence. The construction of the prison included a sewage treatment plant for the prison and neighboring communities in the township.

== Inmate Exposure to Toxic Coal Waste ==
In 2014, a report published by the Abolitionist Law Center found more than 80 percent of inmates were suffering from symptoms related to exposure to coal ash, including respiratory, throat, and sinus conditions, gastrointestinal problems, and adverse skin conditions. Unlike reports of health problems at other state prisons in Pennsylvania, most SCI Fayette inmates responding in the investigation said symptoms didn't appear until after their arrival at SCI Fayette.

The prison is located next to a 506-acre coal ash dump operated by Matt Canestrale Contracting (MCC) since 1997. The dump receives coal ash waste from coal-fired power plants throughout the region. The former owner of the dumpsite as well as the land the prison is built on filed for bankruptcy in 1994. MCC purchased the 1,357-acre property in 1996 and entered into an agreement with the Pennsylvania Department of Environmental Protection (DEP) to begin site reclamation. The dumpsite was then restricted to its current 506 acres and 237 acres were transferred to the Commonwealth of Pennsylvania for the building of SCI Fayette.

MCC's reclamation plan was to “cap” the preexisting coal refuse dump by spreading flue gas desulfurization (FDG) sludge (a liquid form of coal ash) over the area to create a barrier which would prevent rainwater from leaching chemicals into the soil, surface water and groundwater. The FDG cap would then be covered with a mix of coal ash and topsoil. Coal ash and topsoil were also used to stabilize a dam which was holding back a large pond of coal slurry. The dam was categorized as a “high hazard” meaning its failure is “likely to cause loss of human life”.

The Pennsylvania DEP currently allows MCC to dump 416,000 tons of coal ash per year, however MCC reportedly entered into agreement with FirstEnergy in 2017 to dump more than 3 million tons of coal ash and scrubber waste on the site per year. Additionally, MCC has routinely been in violation of state and federal law over its 17 years of operation. Most notably, is MCC's perpetual violation of the Air Pollution Control Act which prohibits allowing particulate matter to leave the boundaries of the dumpsite. Ash is regularly seen blowing off the site or out of haul trucks and collecting on houses of local residents and on prison grounds.

Particulate matter like coal ash is extremely dangerous to human health as course particles can reach the upper respiratory tract and cause issues there, and very fine particles can enter the bloodstream and wreak havoc throughout the body. In addition to this, coal ash contains numerous harmful constituents including mercury, lead, arsenic, hexavalent chromium, cadmium, boron, and thallium. These chemicals have been shown to cause or contribute to skin, eye and throat irritation, asthma, emphysema, hypertension, anemia, heart problems, nervous system damage, brain damage, liver damage, stomach and intestinal ulcers, and many forms of cancer including skin, stomach, lung, urinary tract, and kidney cancers. Despite this, the EPA does not classify coal ash as a hazardous waste, and in Pennsylvania coal ash is authorized for “beneficial use” in reclamation projects like the one at MCC's dump.

A rally to raise awareness and to call for the shutdown of SCI Fayette was held Sept. 19 outside Philadelphia's historic Eastern State Penitentiary, birthplace of the modern U.S. prison system. The event, attended by around 50 people, was organized by the Pennsylvania Human Rights Coalition to raise awareness of the health impacts of toxic coal ash, as well as fracking wastes, and the link between environmental justice and prison abolition.

== Notable inmates ==
Inmate Name	Register Number	Status	Details
Gilbert Newton III	QN0221	Serving a life sentence.	Convicted of murdering his ex-girlfriend.
Adam Leroy Lane	JP7258	Serving a life sentence.	Murdered 3 people in 2007 before being stopped by two residents of a home he was breaking into.

- Caleb Fairley - murderer

== See also ==
- List of Pennsylvania state prisons
