= State Correctional Institution – Cambridge Springs =

Prison in Pennsylvania, United States

Coordinates: 41°47′50″N 80°03′15″W

State Correctional Institution - Cambridge Springs
- Interactive map of State Correctional Institution - Cambridge Springs
- Location: Cambridge Springs, Crawford County, Pennsylvania
- Security class: Minimum-Security
- Capacity: 1,018
- Population: 1,072 (June 30, 2015)
- Opened: March, 1992
- Managed by: Pennsylvania Department of Corrections

State Correctional Institution (SCI) Cambridge Springs is a minimum-security correctional facility for females in Cambridge Springs, in Crawford County in northwestern Pennsylvania. The majority of the inmates housed here are nearing their release from prison.

== Creation of SCI Cambridge Springs ==
In 1990, the Commonwealth of Pennsylvania purchased the former Polish National Alliance College campus and converted into a minimum-security women's institution. SCI Cambridge Springs opened in 1992, with the transfer of inmates from SCI Waynesburg.

== Facility design ==
The existing buildings at SCI Cambridge Springs were built in the 1930s and 1940s; however, construction of new housing units and renovations have since been completed. There are 125 Acres at SCI Cambridge Springs, 40 of those being under the perimeter fence. There are 20 buildings that are operational at the facility, including five (5) out of six (6) housing units that contain both cells and dormitory-style living for inmates.

== Capacity and demographics ==
At SCI Cambridge Springs, the inmate population, according to the June 2015 Monthly Inmate Capacity Report, presently there are 1,072 inmates being held there. This is 54 inmates over the capacity of 1,018 inmates, or a little bit over 105% capacity for the institution. The average age of an inmate at Cambridge Springs is 38 and the facility employs 311 full-time employees.

== Inmate programs ==
Inmate Supports at SCI Cambridge Springs include:

=== Education and training ===
- GED Training
- Vocational Education: Optical, Braille, Custodial Maintenance, Cosmetology

=== Inmate support groups ===
- Family/Relationship Self
- Sex Offenders
- Alcohol and Other Drug (AOD)
- Offense Related
- Mental Health Programs

=== Prison and community development ===
- Virtual Visitation
- Correctional Industries: Optical Lab that makes glasses for all of the DOC facilities. The Lab also services DEP Southeastern Region, DPW Norristown State Hospital, and other local nonprofit agencies. The inmate must successfully complete a six-month vocational class before being permitted or eligible to work in the Optical Lab. After completing the six-month vocational training, inmates have an opportunity to take the American Board of Opticianry test to become a certified Optician. This certification allows them to practice Opticianry in the United States.
- Community Work Program - Inmates worked nearly 3,000 hours of CWP this year in the surrounding community.

== Notable inmates ==
Notable inmates incarcerated at the facility include:

- Angela Marinucci – Convicted of the murder of Jennifer Daugherty

== See also ==
- List of Pennsylvania state prisons
