= Alliance College =

Liberal arts college in Cambridge Springs, Pennsylvania (1912–1987)

- Type: Private
- Active: September 1912–June 30, 1987
- Founder: Polish National Alliance
- Accreditation: Middle States Commission on Higher Education
- Location: Cambridge Springs, Pennsylvania
- Campus: Rural
- Colors: red, white
- Nickname: Eagles

Alliance College was an independent, liberal arts college located in Cambridge Springs, Pennsylvania, offering a special program in Polish and Slavic languages (i.e., Slavistics). It was originally an academy at the high school level. In the 1920s, it added a junior college degree. From 1948 until its closing in 1987, the college was an accredited four-year co-educational liberal arts institution. Student matriculation peaked at 629 in 1968 but was usually much lower. By 1987, it was 176.

== History ==
The school was founded by the Polish National Alliance (PNA) in 1912 "to provide opportunities for Americans of Polish descent to learn about the mother country, its culture, history, and language." The 90,000 members of the PNA paid a nickel each until the PNA could purchase the defunct Rider Hotel in Cambridge Springs, Pennsylvania for $175,000. When the college was dedicated in September 1912, then United States President William Howard Taft, gave a speech.

The college initially specialized in Polish studies, in both history, as well as the Polish language, however, by 1915, the college started to offer technical courses, and before the end of World War I, had a Reserve Officers' Training Corps and the college had become a U.S. Army training center for mechanical subjects. This Army backed institution would remain open until 1965. The initial class of 1916 numbered 326 individuals, with class numbers dipping as low as 133 in 1986 and peaking at 629 in 1968. In 1948, the college was accredited by the state of Pennsylvania and opened enrollment to women. Due to declining attendance, the school was forced to shut down in 1987 as it could no longer afford to function.

Alliance was also home to the Polish Museum of America, the first Polish museum in the country, which contained letters from George Washington to Polish leaders during the American Revolutionary War, however, the museum would burn down in 1931. Classes were usually taught in English. It was nationally famous for its Kujawiaki folk dance ensemble. It also operated exchange programs with Jagiellonian University in Kraków, Poland.

Following the college's closure, the campus was sold in 1990 to the Commonwealth of Pennsylvania, which in 1992, opened State Correctional Institution (SCI) – Cambridge Springs, a minimum-security women's prison, at the site.

== Polish collection ==
Alliance College's library housed the largest Polish collection (35,000 cataloged and 15,000 uncataloged volumes) in North America. The collection was donated by the PNA to the University of Pittsburgh in 1991.

== Legacy ==
The office of the registrar at Mercyhurst College in Erie, Pennsylvania, is the designated agent for storing and retrieving Alliance College transcripts.

Despite the college no longer existing, Alliance College's alumni maintain an active digital presence to preserve the history of the school.

== Student life ==
The college had chapters of Alpha Kappa Lambda, Delta Zeta, Pi Lambda Phi, Sigma Tau Gamma, and Tau Kappa Epsilon.

== Athletics ==
The school's sports teams were called the Eagles. According to College Football Data Warehouse, Alliance College played football only sporadically until after World War II. In four seasons after the war, Alliance compiled a 12–21 record. The 1948 team enjoyed a winning season. After losses to St. Francis (PA), St. Vincent (PA), Duquesne (PA), and Juniata (PA), the Eagles rebounded with five straight wins over Brockport State (NY), Lock Haven State (PA), Clarion (PA), Edinboro (PA), and Steubenville (OH). The Eagles won only one game in 1949 before dropping football in March 1950.
