= State Correctional Institution – Camp Hill =

Prison in Pennsylvania, US

Coordinates: 40°13′00″N 76°55′41″W

State Correctional Institution at Camp Hill
- Interactive map of State Correctional Institution at Camp Hill
- Location: Lower Allen Township, Cumberland County, near Camp Hill, Pennsylvania, U.S.
- Managed by: Pennsylvania Department of Corrections
- Website: pa.gov/agencies/cor/state-prisons/sci-camp-hill

The State Correctional Institution at Camp Hill (commonly referred to as SCI Camp Hill) is a Pennsylvania Department of Corrections prison in Lower Allen Township, Cumberland County, near Camp Hill in Greater Harrisburg. Its current superintendent is Michael Gourley. It has over 2,000 inmates.

== History ==
SCI Camp Hill opened in 1941 as the Industrial School at White Hill for Young Offenders and received Huntingdon Reformatory's juvenile population en masse. In 1975 it was ruled that SCI Camp Hill was not an appropriate place to house juvenile offenders, and in 1977 the institution began housing adult male offenders. In 2021, modifications were made to a housing block and was renamed the 'YOP' and began housing the male juveniles that were in the Youth Offenders Program. It now serves as the state's sole diagnostic and classification center for men and houses adult male offenders.

== Sexual Victimization at SCI Camp Hill ==
According to a study by the United States Department of Justice released in August 2010, 1.2% of inmates who responded to a survey reported that they had been sexually victimized at the prison.

== 1989 riots ==
For three days in late October 1989, inmates rioted at SCI Camp Hill. One hundred thirty-eight correctional staff and 70 inmates were injured in the riots. Seventeen people were held hostage and 14 buildings (of the prison's 31 buildings) were destroyed. Sleeping quarters for 500 inmates were lost in the rioting. A number of prison officials resigned or were let go in its aftermath. Overcrowding was ruled a major factor.

At the time of the riots, SCI Camp Hill was nearly 45 percent over capacity, with 2,600 inmates in a 52-acre (210,000 m^{2}) complex intended for 1,820. Robert Freeman was Superintendent at the time of the riots, and John Palakovich (who later became superintendent) was assistant to the superintendent. Senate and House investigations blamed several factors for the riots, including overcrowding, understaffing, a militant group of prisoners, mixing violent and nonviolent inmates, lack of leadership and poor construction. Prisoners were angered by the sudden change of two important prison policies affecting visitation and access to medical care. After the riots, the state of Pennsylvania spent millions to repair and improve the prison. One of the hostages later described the fallout of his experience, including post-traumatic stress disorder and alcoholism.

A number of Correction Officers later alleged that the administration ignored their reports that an inmate rebellion was planned.

=== Day 1: Wednesday, October 25 ===
The riots began on October 25. Around 3 P.M., as about 1,000 inmates were being moved through a recreation area, one inmate attacked a Correction Officer and the inmates then overpowered the other CO's. Some CO's locked themselves into a secure area, but officials said that inmates tore down the walls, beat them, and took eight of them hostage. Within minutes, inmates set at least five major fires, which destroyed a food service area, the prison hospital, the auditorium of the educational building, a gate house and part of an industrial building where inmates built furniture, roasted coffee beans and put tea into teabags. (The smoke cast the smell of brewing coffee for miles around.) About 10 PM, several hundred state police officers marched into the prison. Inmates released some hostages and police rescued the others. In the first round of rioting, inmates removed metal covers over the boxes that controlled the locks of their cells.

=== Day 2: Thursday, October 26 ===
Early the next morning, Sgt. Richard Gavin of the Corrections Department pointed out the broken lock-control panels to officials. He asked his supervisor for 43 locks to secure the inmates in his area but received only 19.

Superintendent Freeman met for an hour with six of the inmates who helped negotiate an end to the previous night's siege. He learned that the inmates' grievances included a rule change barring families from bringing food on visits and complaints of access to health care.

Guards later alleged that they knew after the first night of violence that inmates might riot again because prison officials had failed to fix control boxes and broken cell locks that were broken in the first riot. Over 15 correctional officers said the prison administration was alerted but ignored the problem after the first night of riots. Several prison guards also alleged that officials lied about the time they had secured the prison after the first night of riots. A Corrections Department spokeswoman stated that the prison was under control when officials said it was, at 10 P.M., but guards said that some inmates were loose hours after that.

At 7pm on October 26, the second riot began as guards were locking up the inmates. Many inmates were able to reach up above their cell doors and release themselves from their cells due to locks damaged the night before, and they seized control of the prison within hours. The inmates took five new hostages and set more fires. Police spoke with the inmates over a telephone and the inmates "asked for certain items", including a television, Superintendent Freeman said. "I don't know what their grievances were, but they didn't get their demands", he said. Firefighters fought the fires and hundreds of the state police and police departments of five surrounding towns were called in as reinforcement. The police tried to regain control of the prison several times, unsuccessfully. According to one corrections officer quoted by the New York Times, "Last night was a riot. Tonight was war."

=== Day 3: Friday, October 27: Final Day/Aftermath ===
The morning of October 27, Pennsylvania State Troopers stormed the prison, rescued five hostages, and regained control of the prison. According to officials, the state police stormed a kitchen area where the most militant inmates were holed up and subdued them. The police then rescued one hostage from an adjoining cell-block, and as the police took control, inmates released the remaining hostages. All inmates surrendered by 9 AM.

Some inmates were held in the four cellblocks not destroyed in the riots, and the rest were held outdoors in two recreational fields, surrounded by police in riot gear. Officials said that many inmates had stayed clear of the rioting.

744 of the 2,600 prisoners were immediately transferred to other state penitentiaries, and officials quickly sought to transfer 150 more. The Bureau of Federal Prisons agreed to allow Federal penitentiaries in Pennsylvania to take up to 800 inmates (not the Camp Hill inmates, but state prison inmates whom they displaced after the transfer). Nineteen inmates were bused to SCI Graterford on Nov. 6. According to an indictment by United States Attorney Michael Baylson, they were met by 50 guards, half of whom were in riot gear, and 15 of the inmates were led in handcuffs through a gauntlet of guards who beat them with batons, kicks, and electric stun guns. A lawsuit later by the family of one beaten prisoner, Richard Mayo, said he died seven months later as a result of his injuries and lack of medical care after the beating. A prison spokesman said officials believed Mayo died of complications associated with AIDS. Thirteen guards were indicted in the assault on the inmates at SCI Graterford.

On October 29, Governor Robert P. Casey appointed an independent commission to investigate the riots and bring criminal charges against inmates responsible. As of October 30, five inmates were still believed missing.

On October 31, prison officials announced that all inmates were accounted for. Hundreds of inmates who slept outdoors for three days were returned to cells.

On November 1, Superintendent Freeman was suspended by State Corrections Commissioner, David S. Owens Jr., pending an investigation.

An inmate who was transferred to Camp Hill weeks after the riots described conditions for the inmates: "They took everything from us... No phone calls, no visitors, nothing to read, no one to talk to. Twenty-four hours per day for 45 days... They delivered our food in brown paper bags, and because we were unable to contact anyone, I couldn't contact my family. They had no idea where I was or if I was OK. That was the worst part — that I couldn't call my mother and tell her where I was. I was afraid and miserable. We didn't have soap, no deodorant, no anything. I remember everything was burnt. I was just existing and praying."

A 25-year-old inmate, William Diggs, serving 3 to 6 years for robbery, was the first inmate charged after the riots.

Artifacts, photographs, video footage, and more information can be found at the Pennsylvania State Police Museum in nearby Hershey, Pennsylvania

== Notable Inmates ==
- Kenneth Hoyle

== See also ==
- List of Pennsylvania state prisons
- George Banks Guard/mass murderer
