= George Feigley =

American church leader

George Feigley

George Feigley (June 23, 1940 – April 13, 2009) was an American church leader. He has been described as a sex cult leader. Feigley called himself "The Light of the World,", a phrase previously used in the self-description of Jesus. Feigley served over 32 years in prison for sex crimes against children, from 1975 to 2008.

In 1971, Feigley founded both a "Neo-American" church and a school in Harrisburg, Pennsylvania. His church doctrine emphasized the transcendent or mystical power of orgasm, and reportedly advocated the use of children for sexual gratification. Feigley wrote a book entitled The Sale of Lillian, which described the sexual abuse of a 10-year-old girl, and contained graphic illustrations of such abuse. Feigley led the church in freedom for only about five years, as he was arrested in 1975 on multiple counts of statutory rape, indecent assault, and corrupting the morals of minors. He was found guilty of statutory rape of two teenage girls and was sentenced to 10 years to 20 years in prison.

In 1994, while still in prison, Feigley was convicted of instructing his wife and another man over a prison phone to rape a 14-year-old girl. Feigley was found guilty of conspiracy to commit involuntary deviate sexual intercourse and sentenced. Because of problems with the search warrants, Feigley's wife and the girl's mother were able to plead guilty and receive probation.In 1996, while imprisoned, Feigley co-founded the prisoners' advocacy website and nonprofit organization prisoners.com, along with his wife Sandra.

== Religious career ==
In 1971, Feigley founded an organization he called the Neo American Church (not be confused with the more notable and unrelated Neo-American Church, a psychedelian religion founded by Arthur Kleps in the mid-1960s) and the associated Neo American School. The church and school were located in Harrisburg, Pennsylvania.

We hold that the changes called creation and procreation are divine and that human sexuality is to humans the most available expression of that function of divinity... Sexual activity is the greatest act a human can do.

— Neo American Church Manifesto, described by Scott Portzline

Church doctrine emphasized the transcendent or mystical power of orgasm. According to police reports, it also advocated the use of children for sexual gratification. While leading the cult, Feigley authored several publications under the pseudonym G.G. Stoctay. These included a book entitled The Sale of Lillian, which described the sexual abuse of a 10-year-old girl, and contained graphic illustrations of such abuse.

The charismatic Feigley, who called himself "The Light of the World", gathered a small group of followers, mostly women, into his church. As of 1983, the group, which at one point had numbered over twenty persons, included about ten adults, one or two of whom were men (five children of group members were then living in foster homes where they had been placed by the state).

== Imprisonment, escape, and re-capture ==
Feigley led the church in freedom for only about five years, as he was arrested in 1975 on multiple counts of statutory rape, indecent assault, and corrupting the morals of minors. He was found guilty of statutory rape of two teenage girls and was sentenced to 10 years to 20 years in prison. His wife was found guilty of corrupting the morals of minors.

I require total devotion to my desires. You may not have a will nor desire of your own which do not project my wishes. I expect this complete commitment from my wives, my concubines and my children... Make yourselves my delight... May my peace abide with you.

— George Feigly, Letter from prison

Notwithstanding his imprisonment, some of Feigley's followers remained loyal, roaming to follow him as he was moved from prison to prison or when he was a fugitive.

In 1976, Feigley scaled a prison wall at SCI- Rockview and fled to West Virginia. While he was on the lam he hid at a farm near Thornton, West Virginia, which he and his followers referred to as the "Aaron Farm". He was apprehended in 1978, but escaped from the Taylor County Jail in Grafton less than a month later while awaiting extradition back to Pennsylvania. He was assisted in this escape by fellow prisoner James Lee Gilbert, who joined the cult after engineering the escape. After his second escape he was free for two months before he was recaptured, hiding on another farm near Sneedville, Tennessee.

In 1981, plans for Feigley to escape from SCI- Graterford by helicopter were uncovered. In response Feigley was transferred to Western Penitentiary.

His women followers visited him regularly at the State Correctional Institution at Huntingdon, Pennsylvania. The organization continued to operate; a 1983 raid on Feigley's home found young children playing with sex toys and boxes of child pornography. Feigley's wife and others pleaded guilty to corruption of minors and were sentenced to prison.

In 1983, James Lee Gilbert and another of Feigley's followers, Laura Seligman, died in circumstances that led authorities to believe they were intending to break Feigley out of prison. (They drowned in a sewer line close to Western Penitentiary where Feigley was then held.)

In 1994, while still in prison, Feigley was convicted of instructing his wife and another man over a prison phone to rape a 14-year-old girl. Feigley was found guilty of conspiracy to commit involuntary deviate sexual intercourse and sentenced. Because of problems with the search warrants, Feigley's wife and the girl's mother were able to plead guilty and receive probation.

== Prisoner activism ==
In 1996, while imprisoned, Feigley co-founded the prisoners' advocacy website and nonprofit organization prisoners.com, along with his wife Sandra. He contributed to the website to the extent possible while he was in prison. The organization was purported to be "the voice of the imprisoned" and criticized the Pennsylvania Department of Corrections for alleged abuses. It also provided information useful to prisoners and their loved ones.

The website also featured biographies of and works of art by prisoners, and health essays by Feigley under the pseudonym "Professor Stoctay". However, in addition to this advocacy for prisoners, the site was also used to publish some of Feigley's rationalizations for his crimes. As of April 2019, the website was defunct.

== Release ==
Feigley became eligible for parole in 1990, but parole was denied then and at each subsequent annual review. Having served the full time for all his convictions, Feigley was released from prison on August 15, 2008, to some consternation. His convictions were not covered under Pennsylvania's Megan's Laws (his 1976 conviction preceded Megan's Law, and conspiracy to commit involuntary deviate sexual intercourse — his 1994 charge — is not covered under the law), so he was not required to register as a sex offender, nor was he on parole as he had served his sentences in full.

His return home was met with a crowd of protestors. A neighbor circulated a petition to prevent Feigley's return to his home.

== Death ==
Feigley, who left prison in poor health, died on April 13, 2009.

== See also ==
- List of prison escapes
- List of helicopter prison escapes
