= Institutions for Defective Delinquents =

Eugenic prisons in US history

Institutions for Defective Delinquents (IDDs) were created in the United States as a result of the eugenic criminology movement. The practices in these IDDs contain many traces of the eugenics that were first proposed by Sir Francis Galton in the late 1800s. Galton believed that "our understanding of the laws of heredity [could be used] to improve the stock of humankind." Galton eventually expanded on these ideas to suggest that individuals deemed inferior, those in prisons or asylums and those with hereditary diseases, would be discouraged from having children.

== History ==
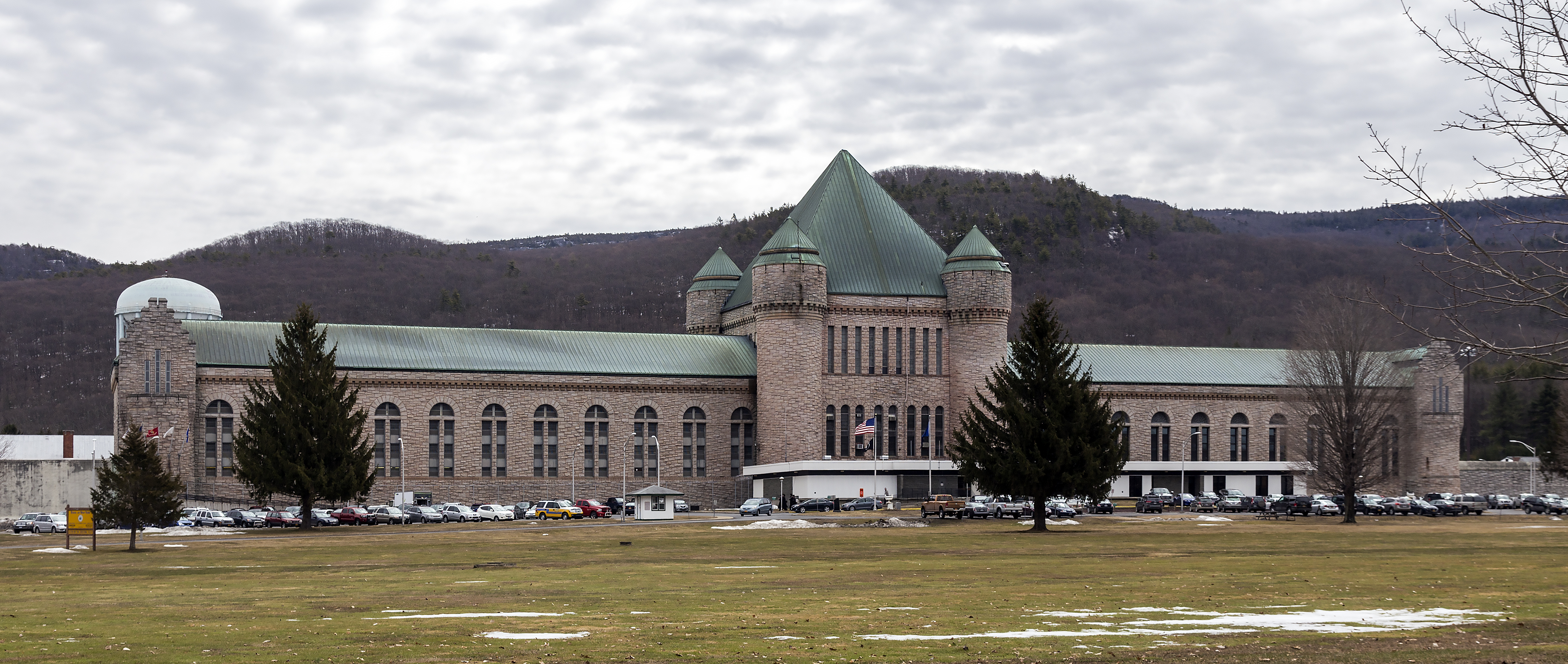
Eastern Correctional Facility, Napanoch, New York, in 2015

The term "defective delinquents" was first used in 1910 by the eugenicist Orlando F. Lewis of New York, or Walter Fernand of Massachusetts. In any case, it was in wide distribution by the end of 1912. This new identification of a class of (broadly described) mentally deficient criminals, already imprisoned by state and local governments, caused a conversation about what sort of institution they could best belong in:

Superintendents of the feebleminded now argued that delinquent and disruptive defectives should be removed to more secure, prisonlike quarters. Following suit, prison officials used "defective delinquent" to designate their institutional problems, arguing that intractable prisoners should be segregated in specialized, hospital-like institutions. Nonetheless, a spokesperson for the Massachusetts Board of Insanity pointed out, defective delinquents should definitely not be sent to hospitals for the mentally ill, for they tend to escape and commit sex offenses and arson.

As of 1912, the following institutions reported that defective delinquents constituted at least 20% of their populations:

- Lancaster Industrial School for Girls, Lancaster, Massachusetts
- New York State Reformatory, Elmira, New York
- New Jersey State Reformatory, Rahway, New Jersey
- New York State Reformatory for Women, Bedford Hills, New York
- Maryland Industrial School for Girls, Baltimore, Maryland (the highest, at 60%)
- New Jersey State Home for Girls, Trenton, New Jersey
- Illinois State School for Boys, St. Charles, Illinois

The first dedicated IDD opened on June 1, 1921, at the New York Eastern Reformatory at Napanoch and was opened to prisoners "whose intelligence quotient lies between 35 and 75, and whose chronological age is 16 years or older." Patient-convicts in IDDs each had an extensive profile consisting of genealogy, various results from tests measuring levels of cognition, and descriptions of mental illnesses like alcoholism or schizophrenia that eugenicists associated with an inferior gene pool. Various other tests, such as a modified version of the Binet-Simon Weighted Cube Test, which quantified ethical decision-making, were run to further the understanding of "feeble-mindedness."

Populations of IDDs contained disproportionate numbers of inmates with foreign-born parents as well as African Americans. Many phenomenon psychologists have said that these populations were over-represented at IDDs because of the Great Migration, as "many of the Negroes born in the rural south become restless, drift northward and get into trouble in the metropolitan areas where the demands of the community are so much more exacting than those of the districts from which they come." Explanations for the demographics of IDDs also include birth order, education, delayed puberty, and heredity and environmental backgrounds.

While many IDDs are still operational, they have been estranged from their eugenicist roots in the wake of new theories of criminal psychology and psychopathology.

== Relationship between eugenics and crime ==
Between 1830 and 1870 there were a number of theories about the connection between crime and defective mental states, and extensive literature had developed on the existence of mental types such as the idiot, imbecile or psychopath—all of whom were not considered insane, but all likely to be found in the criminal population.

Even Phrenologists were suggesting that crime and evil were physiological conditions resulting from the structure of the brain. Most compellingly, however, the study of criminal subcultures seemed to show the existence of 'bad families' in which crime was almost hereditary. As early as the 1860s, Morel had fully synthesized these theories to explain crime as a component of his detailed classification of 'degenerate' types. Behavioral traits such as crime, idiocy, epilepsy, alcoholism, and insanity were all likely to be found in 'degenerate' families.

Specifically in the United States, Pennsylvania was one of the first areas to be influenced by the link between defective mental states and crime. Dorothea Dix led a campaign to remove insane convicts to a special asylum alluding that crime was a symptom of a mental condition of which insanity was all but an extreme manifestation. Thus, in the early days of the eugenics movement, prison was intended to be filled only with offenders who could undergo rehabilitation, while alternate 'mental' institutions provided the necessary segregation to control and prevent the procreation of 'degenerate' racial types. Because the eugenics movement found early support among the state's political and administrative elite, such as Isaac N. Kerlin, who carried a public campaign for strict eugenic segregation as a means of preventing crime and social decay, many campaigns advocated and supported the 'eugenic solution' which ultimately manifested itself in eugenic institutions/centers such as Elwyn.

Some centers specifically targeted women in an effort to control and regulate a subsection of the female population that was defined as fertile, feeble-minded, female paupers and therefore officially recognized as dysgenic. This theoretical relationship manifested itself in early legislation that supported psychological asylums that aimed to indirectly criminalize not an action, but the female body itself.

== Eugenics in prisons during the 20th Century ==
As World War II came to a close in 1945 the eugenics movement, which was founded on the idea that the improvement of human genetic traits would result in a more desirable population, quickly lost legitimacy in the scientific community. However, it was important to note that prior to the end of the war, eugenics proved to be a major factor in motivating other (seemingly unconnected) reforms in health, welfare, housing, education, or penology. In order to appreciate the nature of reform in the Progressive Era, it is essential to understand the eugenics movement and how it quickly gained popularity - especially when the movement required extensive legislation and the building of institutions, such as prisons. The science of eugenics appealed to conservatives because it proved a technocratic and modern-sounding framework to control the growing power of immigrants. Prior to this scientific theory, they had attempted to impose their cultural values on newcomers through the traditional 'symbolic crusades' of temperance and evangelism. The changing political climate, however, rendered these methods archaic and eugenics gained popularity because it provided the ideological structure necessary to give scientific substance to traditional prejudices. In 1915, social and political elites were attempting to control lower-class newcomers through reforming and 'child saving' institutions backed by the science of eugenics which seemed more reasonable than religion.

== Eugenic prison themes in the media ==
=== Sterilized Behind Bars ===
Sterilized Behind Bars is a documentary about the forced sterilization of female prisoners. The film focuses on the State of California, where nearly 20,000 women are recorded to have experienced forced sterilization. The film shows the several personal experiences of female prisoners, showing how vulnerable a woman's body is because she doesn't know better, 'I figured that it's just what happens in prison.' It touches on the notion of "informed consent" when prisoners aren't given much of a choice from prison staff. Power is misused and refusal to comply is answered with retaliation. Now victims out of prison are asking for monetary compensation from their respective states. Justice Now, an organization based in Oakland, started taking note of forced sterilizations when they received several accounts from former inmates about missing ovaries or their uterus.
