= Pennsylvania Department of Corrections =

State agency in Pennsylvania, U.S.

- Patch

- Logo

- Seal

Agency overview
- Formed: 1829
- Preceding agency: Bureau of Correction

Jurisdictional structure
- Operations jurisdiction: Pennsylvania, USA
- Map of Pennsylvania Department of Corrections's jurisdiction
- Area: 46,055 square miles (119,280 km^{2})
- Population: 13,002,700 (2020)
- General nature: Civilian police

Operational structure
- Headquarters: Hampden Township, Pennsylvania
- Agency executive: Laurel R. Harry, Secretary of Corrections

Website
- cor.pa.gov

The Pennsylvania Department of Corrections (PADOC) is the Pennsylvania state agency that is responsible for the confinement, care, and rehabilitation of approximately 37,000 inmates at state correctional facilities funded by the Commonwealth of Pennsylvania. The agency is headquartered in Hampden Township, Cumberland County in Greater Harrisburg, near Mechanicsburg.

In October 2017, then Pennsylvania Governor Tom Wolf signed a "memorandum of understanding" that allows the PADOC and the Pennsylvania Board of Probation and Parole to share like resources and eliminate duplicative efforts. All parole supervision now falls under the jurisdiction of the PADOC; while parole release decisions remain under the jurisdiction of the PA Board of Probation and Parole. The two agencies remain separate. Following passage of the 2021-2022 Pennsylvania budget, the merger was official and permanent.

There are currently 23 state correctional institutions, one motivational boot camp, one central training academy, 14 community corrections centers, 22 parole field offices, and the DOC contracts with approximately 40 contractors across the Commonwealth that provide transitional services. The DOC employs more than 16,000 individuals, and PADOC's population report is available on its website at www.cor.pa.gov.

== History ==
Pennsylvania's history closely intertwines with penology. William Penn initially abolished capital punishment for all crimes except murder, and established other rehabilitation reforms which were considered radical at the time. The commonwealth was the birthplace of the penitentiary concept, also known as the "Pennsylvania" (or "Separate System"). Eastern State Penitentiary opened in 1829 on what was then a cherry orchard outside of Philadelphia. It was considered at the time to be "the world's greatest penitentiary." Known to historians as "the first true penitentiary," Eastern State operated until 1970.

The Bureau of Correction was created by an act of Legislature in September 1953. The foundation was based on a report by Retired Army Major General Jacob L. Devers, and his special committee to investigate prison problems. The committee was convened shortly after riots at Pittsburgh and Rockview in early 1953. It was the committee's mission to recommend ways to improve the correctional system and reduce unrest. Up to this point the state's prisons fell under the Department of Welfare. Here they were governed by their own boards of trustees. The Devers Committee suggested the establishment of one agency, whose sole purpose was to manage the state prison system. Appointed by Gov. John S. Fine, Arthur T. Prasse was selected as the first commissioner of corrections, where he remained until 1970.

In 1980, the Bureau of Correction changed hands from the former Pennsylvania Department of Justice, to the newly created Office of General Counsel to the Governor. Constitutional changes resulted in an elected state attorney general and the disbanding of the Justice Department.

In 1984, under Act 245, the Bureau of Correction was elevated to cabinet-level status, making it the Pennsylvania Department of Corrections.

== Institutions ==
The Department of Corrections maintains 25 institutions across the state as well as the Community Corrections Center, where offenders prepare for re-entry into the community.

The facilities are classified into four security levels: Minimum, Medium, Close, and Maximum.

=== Adult male institutions ===
Facility	County	Security Level	Opened	Capacity
SCI Albion	Erie	Medium	1993	2,152
SCI Benner Township	Centre	Medium	2013	2,087
SCI Camp Hill	Cumberland	Diagnostic	1941	2,000
SCI Chester	Delaware	Medium	1998	1,178
SCI Coal Township	Northumberland	Medium	1993	2,153
SCI Dallas	Luzerne	Medium	1960	2,140
SCI Fayette	Fayette	Maximum	2003	2,034
SCI Forest	Forest	Maximum	2004	2,309
SCI Frackville	Schuylkill	Maximum	1987	1,192
SCI Greene	Greene	Maximum	1993	1,853
SCI Houtzdale	Clearfield	Medium	1996	1,587
SCI Huntingdon	Huntingdon	Close	1889	2,306
SCI Laurel Highlands	Somerset	Minimum	1996	1,653
SCI Mahanoy	Schuylkill	Medium	1993	1,000
SCI Mercer	Mercer	Minimum	1986	1,087
SCI Pine Grove	Indiana	Maximum	2001	1,196
SCI Phoenix	Montgomery	Maximum	2018	3,830
SCI Smithfield	Huntingdon	Close	1988	1,380
SCI Somerset	Somerset	Medium	1993	1,600
SCI Waymart	Wayne	Medium	1989	1,430

=== Adult female institutions ===
Facility	County	Security Level	Opened	Capacity
SCI Cambridge Springs	Crawford	Minimum	1992	1,018
SCI Muncy	Lycoming	Close	1953	1,472

== Death row ==
Pennsylvania's last execution was carried out in July 1999.

The execution complex for Pennsylvania is on the grounds of the State Correctional Institution – Rockview. Many male death row inmates are housed at the State Correctional Institution – Somerset, while some are housed at the State Correctional Institution – Phoenix.

There are no female capital case inmates at this time. If there were, they would be housed at the State Correctional Institution – Muncy. Prior to its closure, State Correctional Institution – Graterford housed male death row inmates. For a period, death penalty prisoners were housed at State Correctional Institution – Greene.

== Headquarters ==
The agency has its headquarters in Hampden Township, Cumberland County in Greater Harrisburg, near Mechanicsburg. The headquarters are located along Technology Parkway in proximity to a residential area.

The agency previously had its headquarters on the grounds of SCI Camp Hill in Lower Allen Township, near Camp Hill, also in Greater Harrisburg. In 2010 the former headquarters were crowded with employees. Construction on the new headquarters started around 2010.

== Training academy ==
The Pennsylvania Department of Corrections Training Academy serves as a training area for prison employees working for the state and county. It is located in Mount Joy Township, Lancaster County, near Elizabethtown and 20 miles (32 km) southeast of Harrisburg. The academy includes nine buildings on 265 acres (107 ha) of land.

The facility was originally the State Hospital for Crippled Children, which opened in 1930. In 1991 the corrections department acquired the facility.

== Parole ==
As of May 2021, all functions of parole supervision have been transferred from the Pennsylvania Board of Probation and Parole to the DOC. DOC operates the 22 parole field offices in three regions and nine districts as well as the institutional parole offices located in each state correctional institution.

State parole agents are divided into two classes: field parole agents and institutional parole agents. All agents are sworn law enforcement officers and are declared to be peace officers with police powers granted to arrest without writ or warrant any person under the jurisdiction of the department.

Institutional Parole Agents are stationed in the state correctional facilities and handle pre-parole investigations, interview potential parolees, assist with hearings for parole violations, and work with inmates in the release process.

Field parole agents are assigned to the 22 parole field offices and handle supervision of all persons under parole and special probation in the commonwealth of Pennsylvania. Special probation is state supervision of county probation cases. Parole agents also handle supervision of all county probation cases in Venango and Mercer Counties due to those counties not having their own probation departments.

Field state parole agents are issued the Glock 45, which is chambered in 9mm. Taser Electronic Control Weapons, OC spray, and batons are also issued to field state parole agents. They do not wear a standardized uniform while on duty.

== See also ==
- List of Pennsylvania state agencies
- List of law enforcement agencies in Pennsylvania
- Prison
