= Ed Savitz =

American businessman and child sex offender (1942–1993)

- Born: Edward Isadore Savitz; February 22, 1942; Philadelphia, Pennsylvania, U.S.
- Died: March 27, 1993 (aged 51)
- Other names: Uncle Eddie, Fast Eddie, Dr. Feel Good
- Occupation: Actuary

Edward Isadore "Ed" Savitz (also known as Uncle Eddie, Fast Eddie and Dr. Feel Good) (February 22, 1942 – March 27, 1993) was an American criminal, businessman, and sexual predator, who was arrested for paying thousands of boys and young men for either engaging in anal and oral sex or for giving him their dirty underwear and feces, which he kept in pizza boxes in his apartment.

== Biography ==
=== Early life ===
Ed Savitz was one of the four sons of Jewish Russian immigrants Paul and Ann Gechman Savitz. The Savitzes ran an amusement arcade in downtown Philadelphia. Ed ranked first in his class of 278 students at West Philadelphia High School, and voted most likely to succeed. He won a full scholarship to study economics at the University of Pennsylvania, but dropped out after two years. In 1967, also after two years' study, he quit Temple University's graduate school of music. In 1963, he married his high school girlfriend Judith Widman, who later became a lawyer specializing in family law. They were divorced 10 years later. In 1981, his brother Joseph, a lawyer who once served as a Deputy Pennsylvania Attorney General, used barbiturates to die by suicide.

=== Sexual abuse ===
Ed Savitz had an apartment on Rittenhouse Square and for years was known by the male youth of the area through word of mouth as a quick source of cash. From as far back as 1975, he offered teenage boys money, concert tickets, and football tickets for their soiled underwear and various sexual acts including: oral and anal sex; slamming his penis in a door; penis sword fights; urinating on him; vomiting in his mouth; and defecating in his mouth through a potty chair. He reportedly kept the feces in pizza boxes in his apartment. He told the boys to eat cheese to make the feces taste better.

Savitz mostly targeted boys from the Schuylkill neighborhood and even had a St. John Neumann High School yearbook which he used like a catalogue, circling the pictures of boys he wanted to see and promising referral fees for bringing them to him.

=== Arrest and death ===
Savitz was first arrested in 1978 on an indecent assault charge. His record was expunged after he completed a rehabilitation program. In 1990, he was found not guilty on charges relating to the purchase of a minor's soiled underwear.

The neighbors in his high-rise apartment building complained of young boys entering and leaving his apartment at all hours of the day and night. One neighbor described the boys she saw as mostly "heavy metal types," who wore black leather clothes and chains and had long hair. Savitz told neighbors that he was a social worker, helping the boys.

Savitz's third arrest followed a six-month investigation by the city's sex-crime unit. By early March 1992, investigators had gathered enough evidence to install a wiretap and hidden video camera in his home. On March 25, 1992, detectives watched as Savitz offered to pay two 15-year-old boys for oral sex. Police burst into the apartment and took him into custody. Savitz was charged with crimes of involuntary deviant sexual intercourse, sexual abuse of children, indecent assault, and corrupting the morals of a minor.

Police found 5,000 photographs of boys and 312 bags of soiled boys' underwear at Savitz's apartment and a rented storage center nearby.

Although Savitz tested HIV-positive about a year before his arrest, he continued to have unprotected sex with boys until his arrest. His arrest caused an AIDS scare in the Philadelphia area due to the large number of individuals that he had sexual contact with. AIDS hotlines were flooded with calls after his photo was released.

Bail was set for three million dollars and Savitz was released. He was arrested again the next day when bail was raised to twenty million dollars after complaints involving two teenagers were verified.

Savitz died of complications from AIDS in a prison hospice on March 27, 1993, one week before the date his trial was set to begin, April 5, 1993.

=== Alleged connection to Jerry Sandusky ===
After the Penn State sex abuse scandal, an article in the New York Daily News featured allegations by one of Savitz's alleged molestation victims. Former Philadelphia child prostitute Greg Bucceroni alleged that in 1979 and 1980 Savitz took him to a fundraiser near Harrisburg for the Second Mile Foundation, which had recently been established by Penn State Defensive Coordinator Jerry Sandusky. Savitz's former friend claims he is unaware of any communication Savitz ever had with Sandusky.
