= Same-sex relationship =

Romantic or sexual relationship between people of the same sex or gender

A same-sex relationship, also known as same-gender relationship, is a romantic or sexual relationship between people of the same sex or gender.

Some couples in same-sex relationships have children, both biological or non-biological, such as adoptive or foster children, and parent them with their partner.

Same-gender or same-sex marriage refers to the institutionalized recognition of such relationships in the form of a marriage; civil unions exist in some countries where same-sex marriage does not.

== Terminology ==
Historically, same-sex relationships have been referred to as homosexual relationships, gay relationships, or lesbian relationships. This led to exclusion of other members of the LGBTQ+ community and has been described as a form of bisexual or transgender erasure, erasing populations within the LGBTQ+ community.

The 21st century has seen a shift in the language and culture of sex and gender. The phrase same-gender relationship is commonly used synonymously with same-sex relationship, with either phrase being used to reference relationships between people of the same sex or gender interchangeably.

Moving from same-sex relationship to same-gender relationship has been described as removing restrictions on the individuals in a same-gender relationship imposed by sexual orientation, as gender identification is a spectrum.

== In history ==
The lives of many historical figures, including Socrates, Alexander the Great, Lord Byron, Edward II, Hadrian, Julius Caesar, Michelangelo, Donatello, Leonardo da Vinci, Oscar Wilde, Vita Sackville-West, Alfonsina Storni and Christopher Marlowe are believed to have included love and sexual relationships with people of their own sex. Terms such as gay or bisexual have often been applied to them; some, such as Michel Foucault, regard this as risking the anachronistic introduction of a contemporary construction of sexuality foreign to their times, though others challenge this.

=== Forms ===
Some contemporary studies have found that same-sex relationships can be broadly grouped into at least three categories, though there is no consensus regarding the categories, nor empirical metric which has, or could potentially be applied to strongly validate their existence:

| Association | Annotations | See also |
|---|---|---|
| Egalitarian | Features two partners belonging to the same generation and adhering to the same gender role associated with their sex (irrespective of their preferred sexual role(s)). This type of same-sex relationship is prevalent in modern Western societies. Egalitarian same-sex relationships are the principal form present in the Western world. As a byproduct of growing Western cultural dominance, this form is spreading from Western culture to non-Western societies although there are still defined differences between the various cultures. | Sexuality and gender identity-based cultures, Gender binary, Same-gender loving |
| Gender-structured | Entails each partner assuming an opposite gender role. One partner is cisgender, while the other is androgynous or transgender, and thus the couple superficially bears some resemblance to a heterosexual (heteronormative) couple. This is exemplified by traditional relations between men in the Middle East, Central and South Asia, non-postmodern Latin America and Southern Europe, as well as two-spirit or shamanic gender-changing practices seen in native societies. In the western world, this is best represented by the butch–femme dichotomy. | Two-Spirit, Hijra and Travesti |
| Age-structured | Involves partners of different ages, usually one adolescent and the other adult. This type of relationship is exemplified by pederasty in ancient Greece. | Shudo, Pederasty, Bacha bazi, Twink |

Often, one form of same-sex relationship predominates in a society, although others are likely to co-exist. Historian Rictor Norton has pointed out that in ancient Greece, egalitarian relationships co-existed (albeit less privileged) with the institution of pederasty, and fascination with adolescents can also be found in modern sexuality, both opposite-sex and same-sex. Age and gender-structured same-sex relationships are less common (though they are still significant and coexist with the postmodern egalitarian form in Latin America, where male heterosexuals and "butch" i.e. macho, active/insertive bisexuals and pansexuals can even share a single identity).

=== Examples in art and literature ===
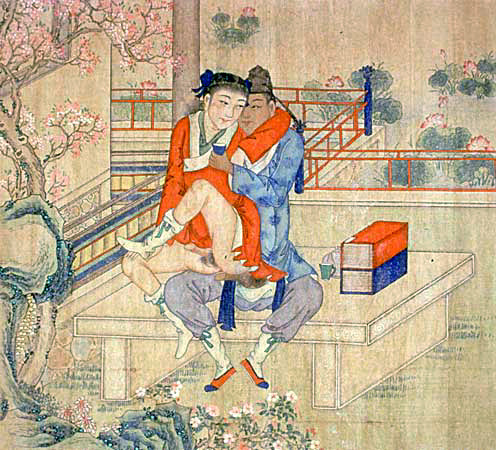
Young men sipping tea, reading poetry, and having sex Individual panel from a hand scroll on same-sex themes, paint on Chinese silk; Kinsey Institute, Bloomington, Indiana

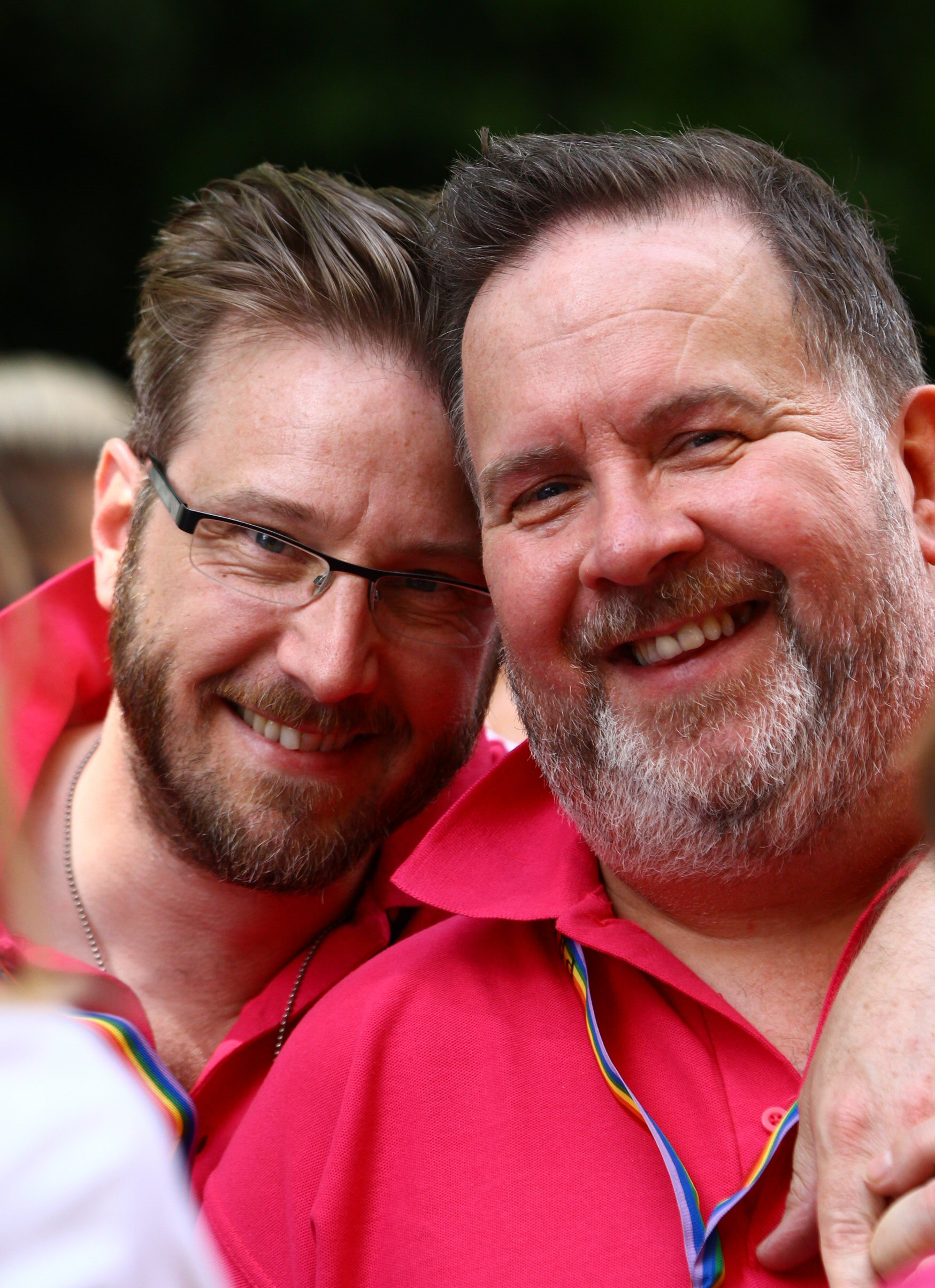
A same-sex male couple at Pride in London

The record of same-sex love has been preserved through literature and art.

In Iranian (Persian) societies, homoeroticism was present in the work of such writers as Abu Nuwas and Omar Khayyam. A large corpus of literature, numbering in the hundreds of works, fostered the shudo tradition in Japan, together with a widespread tradition of homoerotic shunga art.

In the Chinese literary tradition, works such as Bian er Zhai and Jin Ping Mei, survived many purges. Today, the Japanese anime subgenre yaoi centers on gay youths. Japan is unusual in that the culture's male homoerotic art has typically been the work of female artists addressing a female audience, mirroring the case of lesbian eroticism in western art.

In the 1990s, a number of American television comedies began to feature themes on same-sex relationships and characters who expressed same-sex attractions. The 1997 coming-out of comedian Ellen DeGeneres on her show Ellen was front-page news in America and brought the show its highest ratings. However, public interest in the show swiftly declined after this, and the show was cancelled after one more season. Immediately afterward, Will & Grace, which ran from 1998 to 2006 on NBC, became the most successful series to date focusing on male-male sexual relationships. Showtime's Queer as Folk, running from 2000 to 2005, was noted for its somewhat frank depiction of gay life, as well as its vivid sex scenes, containing the first simulated explicit sex scene between two men shown on American television.

Playwrights have penned such popular homoerotic works as Tennessee Williams's Cat on a Hot Tin Roof and Tony Kushner's Angels in America. Same-sex relationships have also been a frequent theme in Broadway musicals, such as A Chorus Line and Rent. In 2005, the film Brokeback Mountain was a financial and critical success internationally. Unlike most same-sex couples in film, both the film's lovers were traditionally masculine and married. The movie's success was considered a milestone in the public acceptance of the American gay rights movement. Miranda July's Kajillionaire (2020) is another unusual example, where the same-sex love plot is latent throughout the film and revealed only partially in the final kiss between Old Dolio and Melainie.

Same-sex relationships in video games were first made available as an option to players in the 1998 game Fallout 2. Beginning in the 2000s, this option was increasingly included in leading role-playing game franchises, pioneered among others by the BioWare series Mass Effect and Dragon Age.

== Legal recognition ==
State protections and prohibitions regarding same-sex couples vary by jurisdiction. In some locations, same-sex couples are extended full marriage rights just as opposite-sex couples, and in other locations they may be extended limited protections or none at all. Policy also varies regarding the adoption of children by same-sex couples.

In their essential psychological respects, these relationships were regarded as equivalent to opposite-sex relationships in a brief amici curiae of the American Psychological Association, California Psychological Association, American Psychiatric Association, National Association of Social Workers, and National Association of Social Workers, California Chapter.

=== State recognition ===
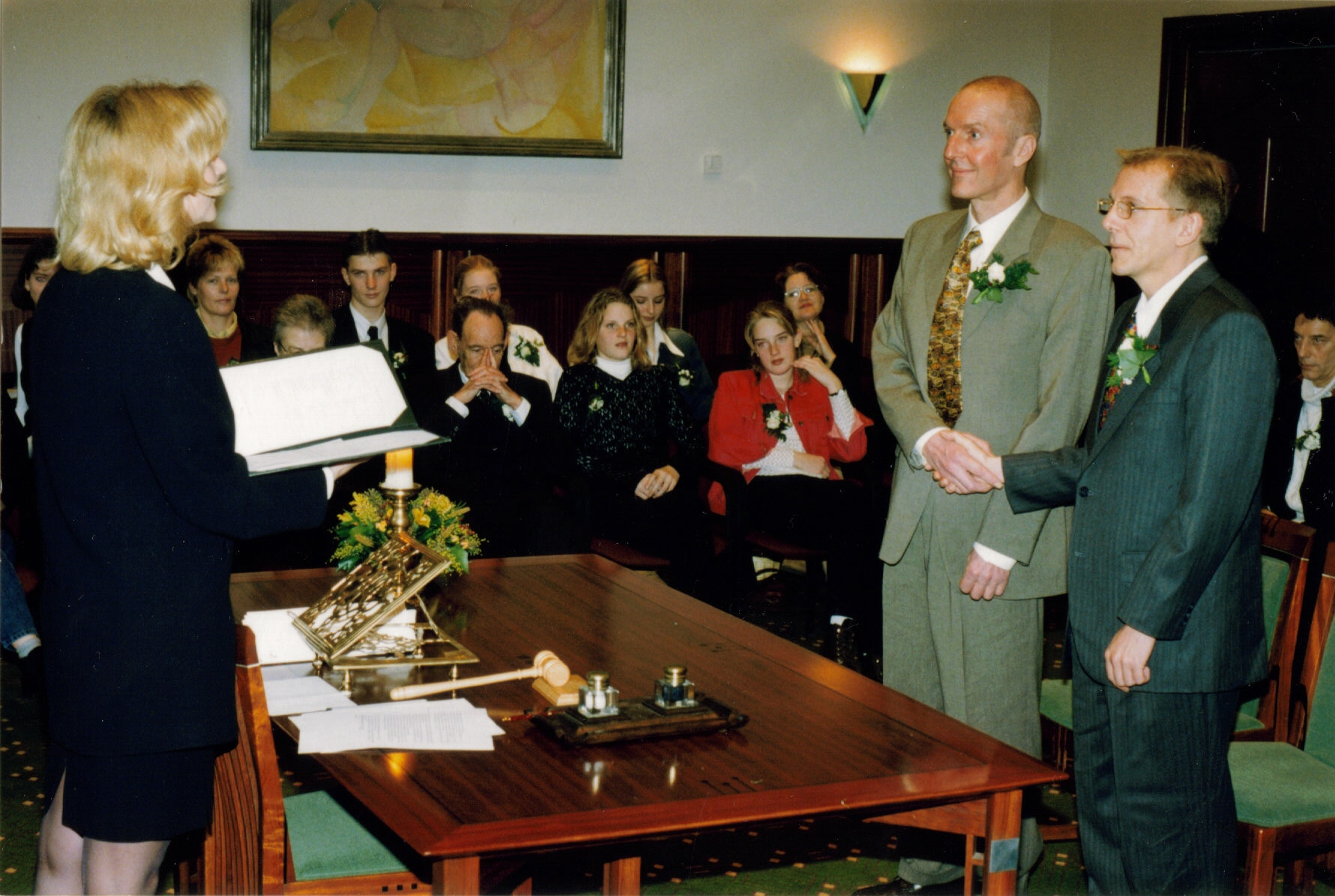
Two men marrying in Amsterdam within the first month that marriage was opened to same-sex couples in the Netherlands (2001)

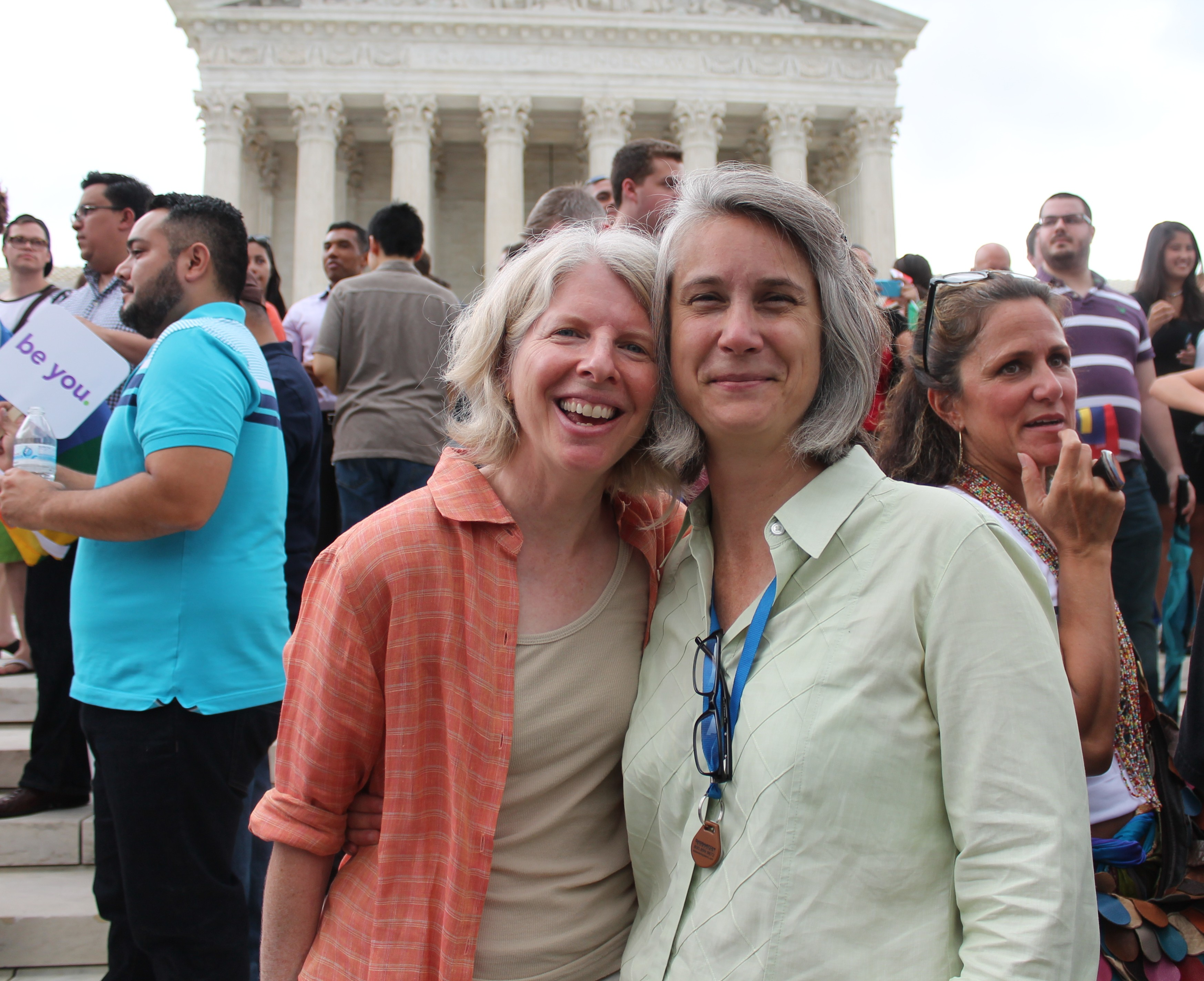
A female same-sex couple celebrating the US Supreme Court decision Obergefell v. Hodges, which recognized same-sex marriage nationwide

Government recognition of same-sex marriage is available in 36 countries (Andorra, Argentina, Australia, Austria, Belgium, Brazil, Canada, Chile, Colombia, Costa Rica, Cuba, Denmark, Ecuador, Estonia, Finland, France, Germany, Greece, Iceland, Ireland, Luxembourg, Malta, Mexico, the Netherlands, (Note: May be registered in Sint Maarten, but performed only in Aruba, Curaçao, and the Netherlands proper.) New Zealand, (Note: Excluding Tokelau, Niue and the Cook Islands.) Norway, Portugal, Slovenia, Spain, South Africa, Sweden, Switzerland, Taiwan, the United Kingdom, (Note: Excluding Anguilla, the British Virgin Islands, Bermuda, the Cayman Islands, Montserrat, and the Turks and Caicos Islands.) the United States, (Note: Excluding some Native American tribes and American Samoa.) and Uruguay) and several sub-national jurisdictions allow same-sex couples to marry. Bills legalizing same-sex marriage are pending, or have passed at least one legislative house in Liechtenstein and Thailand. Other countries, including several European nations, have enacted laws allowing civil unions or domestic partnerships, designed to give gay couples similar rights as married couples concerning legal issues such as inheritance and immigration.

Same-sex couples can legally marry in all U.S. states and receive both state-level and federal benefits. Also, several states offer civil unions or domestic partnerships, granting all or part of the state-level rights and responsibilities of marriage. Though more than 30 states have constitutional restrictions on marriage, all states must recognize same-sex marriages following the U.S. Supreme Court's ruling in Obergefell v. Hodges. All the laws restricting marriage to one man and one woman are therefore unconstitutional and unenforceable.

== Same-sex parenting ==
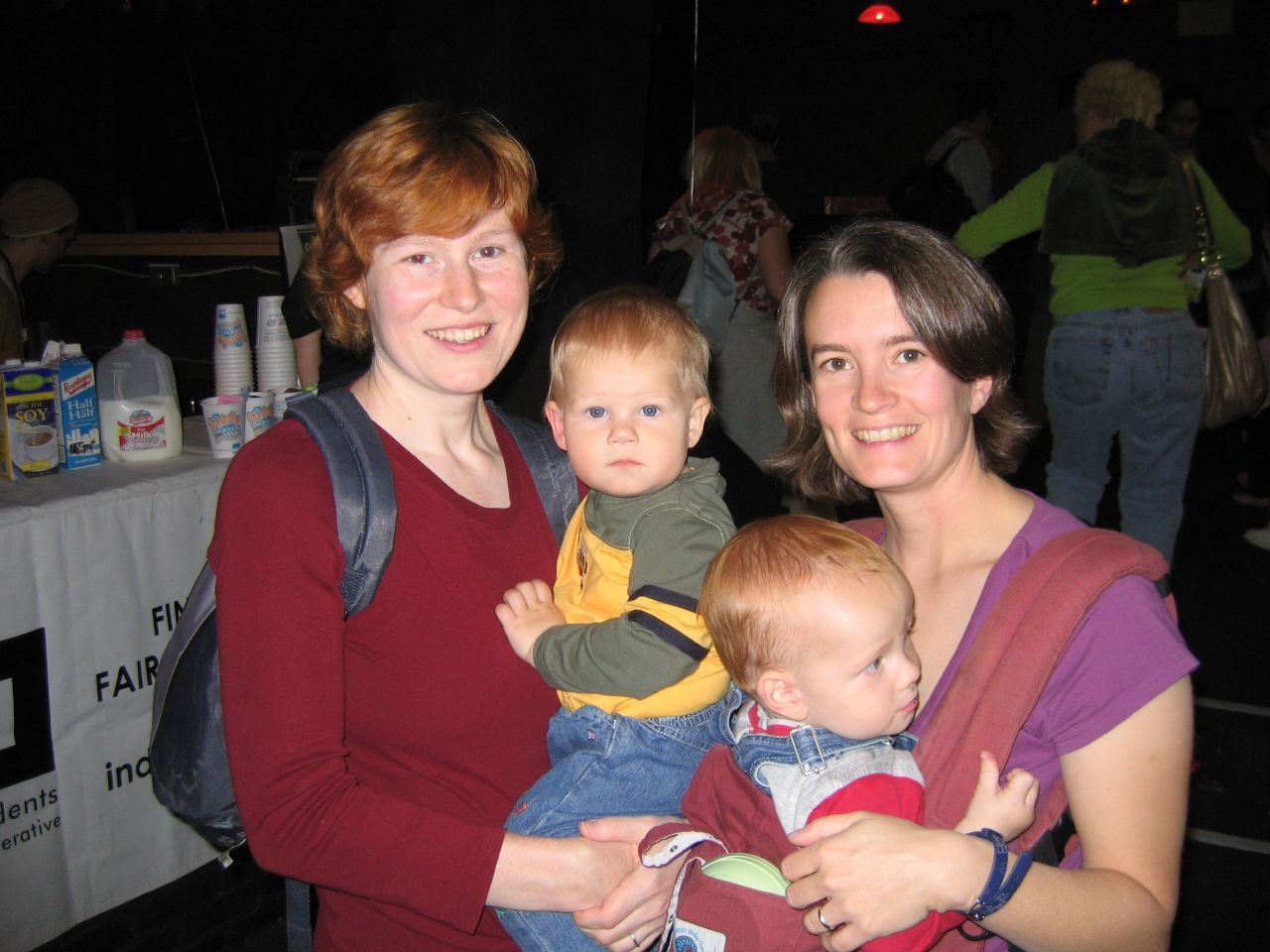
Lesbian couple with children

Same-sex parenting is the parenting of the children of same-sex couples, generally consisting of lesbian, gay or bisexual people, either as biological or non-biological parents. Same-sex male couples face options which include: "foster care, variations of domestic and international adoption, diverse forms of surrogacy (whether "traditional" or gestational), and kinship arrangements, wherein they might coparent with a woman or women with whom they are intimately but not sexually involved." LGBT parents can also include single parents; to a lesser extent, the term sometimes refers to families with LGBT children.

In the 2000 U.S. census, 33 percent of female same-sex couple households and 22 percent of male same-sex couple households reported at least one child under eighteen living in their home. The 2008 general social survey shows that LGBT parents raising children showed 49% were lesbian and bisexual women and 19% were bisexual or gay men. In the United States from 2007 to 2011 the negative public attitude condemning same sex parenting dropped from 50% to 35%. Some children do not know they have an LGBT parent; coming out issues vary and some parents may never come out to their children. LGBT parenting in general, and adoption by LGBT couples may be controversial in some countries. In January 2008, the European Court of Human Rights ruled that same-sex couples have the right to adopt a child. In the U.S., LGBT people can legally adopt in all states.; Arkansas became to last state to permit adoption by same-sex couple when the Arkansas Supreme Court unanimously found the measure banning such adoptions unconstitutional in 2011. Though estimates vary, as many as 2 million to 3.7 million U.S. children under age 18 may have a lesbian, gay, bisexual, or transgender parent, and about 200,000 are being raised by same-sex couples.

There is ample evidence to show that children raised by same-gender parents fare as well as those raised by heterosexual parents. More than 25 years of research have documented that there is no relationship between parents' sexual orientation and any measure of a child's emotional, psychosocial, and behavioral adjustment. This data has demonstrated no risk to children as a result of growing up in a family with one or more gay parents. No research supports the widely held conviction that the gender of parents matters for child well-being. It is well-established that both men and women have the capacity to be good parents, and that having parents of both binary sexes does not enhance adjustment. The methodologies used in the major studies of same-sex parenting meet the standards for research in the field of developmental psychology and psychology generally. They constitute the type of research that members of the respective professions consider reliable. If gay, lesbian, or bisexual parents were inherently less capable than otherwise comparable heterosexual parents, their children would evidence problems regardless of the type of sample. This pattern clearly has not been observed. Given the consistent failures in this research literature to disprove the null hypothesis, the burden of empirical proof is on those who argue that the children of sexual minority parents fare worse than the children of heterosexual parents.

Professor Judith Stacey, of New York University, stated: "Rarely is there as much consensus in any area of social science as in the case of gay parenting, which is why the American Academy of Pediatrics and all of the major professional organizations with expertise in child welfare have issued reports and resolutions in support of gay and lesbian parental rights". These organizations include the American Academy of Pediatrics, the American Academy of Child and Adolescent Psychiatry, the American Psychiatric Association, the American Psychological Association, the American Psychoanalytic Association, the National Association of Social Workers, the Child Welfare League of America, the North American Council on Adoptable Children, and Canadian Psychological Association (CPA). CPA is concerned that some persons and institutions are misinterpreting the findings of psychological research to support their positions, when their positions are more accurately based on other systems of belief or values.

== Same-sex sexuality ==
Types of relationships vary from one couple to another. Some relationships are meant to be temporary, casual, or anonymous sex. Other relationships are more permanent, being in a committed relationship with one another.

On the basis of openness, all romantic relationships are of 2 types: open and closed. Closed relationships are strictly against romantic or sexual activity of partners with anyone else outside the relationships. In an open relationship, all partners remain committed to each other, but allow themselves and their partner to have relationships with others.

On the basis of number of partners, they are of 2 types: monoamorous and polyamorous. A monoamorous relationship is between only two individuals. A polyamorous relationship is among three or more individuals.

Some couples may choose to keep their relationship secret, because of family upbringing, religion, pressure from friends/family, or other reasons.

The names of legal same-sex relationships vary depending on the laws of the land. Same-sex relationships may be legally recognized in the form of marriage, civil unions, domestic partnerships, or registered partnerships.

=== Sexual orientation ===
Individuals may or may not express their sexual orientation in their behaviors. People in a same-sex relationship may identify as homosexual, bisexual, or even occasionally heterosexual.

Equally, not all people with a bisexual or homosexual orientation seek same-sex relationships. According to a 1990 study of The Social Organization of Sexuality, out of 131 women and 108 men who self-reported same-sex attraction, only 43 men (40%) and 42 women (32%) had participated in gay sex. In comparison, a survey by the Family Pride Coalition showed that 50% of gay men had fathered children and 75% of lesbians had children, and even more have had straight sex without having children.

=== Laws against ===
Worldwide laws regarding same-sex intercourse, unions and expression. Same-sex intercourse legal. Recognition of unions: Marriage / Extraterritorial marriage^{2}; Civil unions / Limited domestic; Limited foreign / Optional certification; Same-sex intercourse illegal. Penalties: Death / Prison; death not enforced; Death under militias / Prison, with arrests or detention; Prison, not enforced^{1}; Same-sex intercourse Restricted/Ambiguous. Depends are: None / Restriction of expression, not enforced; Restriction of association with arrests or detention^{1}No imprisonment in the past three years or moratorium on law.^{2}Marriage not available locally. Some jurisdictions may perform other types of partnerships.

A sodomy law defines certain sexual acts as sex crimes. The precise sexual acts meant by the term sodomy are rarely spelled out in the law, but is typically understood by courts to include any sexual act which does not lead to procreation. Furthermore, Sodomy has many synonyms: buggery, crime against nature, unnatural act, deviant sexual intercourse. It also has a range of similar euphemisms. While in theory, this may include heterosexual oral sex, anal sex, masturbation, and bestiality, in practice such laws are primarily enforced against sex between men (particularly anal sex).

In the United States, the Supreme Court invalidated all sodomy laws in Lawrence v. Texas in 2003. 47 out of 50 states had repealed any specifically anti-homosexual-conduct laws at the time.

Some other countries criminalize homosexual acts. In a handful of countries, all of which are Muslim countries, it remains a capital crime. In a highly publicized case, two male teenagers, Mahmoud Asgari and Ayaz Marhoni, were hanged in Iran in 2005 reportedly because they had been caught having sex with each other, though this is disputed.

=== Men who have sex with men (MSM) ===
Men who have sex with men (MSM) refers to men who engage in sexual activity with other men, regardless of how they identify themselves; many choose not to accept social identities of gay or bisexual. The term was created in the 1990s by epidemiologists in order to study the spread of disease among men who have sex with men, regardless of identity. As a risk category, MSM are not limited to small, self-identified, and visible sub-populations. MSM and gay refer to different things: behaviors and social identities. MSM refers to sexual activities between men, regardless of how they identify whereas gay can include those activities but is more broadly seen as a cultural identity. MSM is often used in medical literature and social research to describe such men as a group for clinical study without considering issues of self-identification.

As with any sexual relationship, people may begin with various forms of foreplay such as fondling, caressing, and kissing, and may or may not experiment with other practices, as they see fit. Sex between males can include manual sex, frot, intercrural sex, oral sex and anal sex.

=== Women who have sex with women (WSW) ===
Women who have sex with women (WSW) is a term used to identify women who have sex with other women, but may or may not self-identify as lesbian or bisexual. Sex between two females can include tribadism and frottage, manual sex, oral sex, and the use of sex toys for vaginal, anal, or oral penetration or clitoral stimulation. As with any sexual relationship, people may begin with various forms of foreplay such as fondling, caressing, and kissing, and may or may not experiment with other practices, as they see fit.

=== Religious perspectives ===
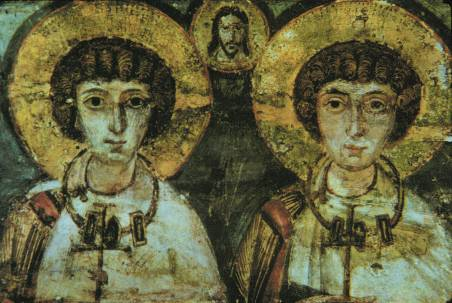
According to historian John Boswell, Saints Sergius and Bacchus may have been united in a pact called Adelphopoiesis, or "brother-making".

Religions have had differing views about love and sexual relations between people of the same sex. A large proportion of the Abrahamic sects view sexual relationships outside of a heterosexual marriage, including sex between same-sex partners, negatively, though there are groups within each faith that disagree with orthodox positions and challenge their doctrinal authority. The Bible can also be understood literally, as homosexuality is viewed as sinful and problematic. Opposition to homosexual behavior ranges from quietly discouraging displays and activities to those who explicitly forbid same-sex sexual practices among adherents and actively opposing social acceptance of homosexual relationships. Support of homosexual behavior is reflected in the acceptance of sexually heterodox individuals in all functions of the church, and the sanctification of same-sex unions. Furthermore, liberal Christians may not consider same-sex relations to be sinful. Jews, Mainline Protestants and the religiously unaffiliated tend to be more supportive of gay and lesbian relationships.

Some churches have changed their doctrine to accommodate same-sex relationships. Reform Judaism, the largest branch of Judaism outside Israel has begun to facilitate religious same-sex marriages for adherents in their synagogues. Jewish Theological Seminary, considered to be the flagship institution of Conservative Judaism, decided in March 2007 to begin accepting applicants in same-sex relationships, after scholars who guide the movement lifted the ban on ordaining people in same-sex relationships. In 2005, the United Church of Christ became the largest Christian denomination in the United States to formally endorse same-sex marriage.

On the other hand, the Anglican Communion encountered discord that caused a rift between the African (except Southern Africa) and Asian Anglican churches on the one hand and North American churches on the other when American and Canadian churches openly ordained clergy in same-sex relations and began same-sex unions. Other churches such as the Methodist Church had experienced trials of clergy in same-sex relations who some claimed were a violation of religious principles resulting in mixed verdicts dependent on geography.

Some religious groups have even promoted boycotts of corporations whose policies support same-sex relations. In early 2005, the American Family Association threatened a boycott of Ford products to protest Ford's perceived support of "the homosexual agenda and homosexual marriage".

== See also ==
- Cross-sex friendship
- Courtship
- Casual relationship
- Timeline of LGBT history
