= E. J. Sandusky =

American football coach (born c. 1969)

Biographical details
- Born: c. 1969 (age 56–57)
- Education: Pennsylvania State University (1992)

Playing career
- 1988–1992: Penn State
- Position: Center

Coaching career (HC unless noted)
- 1993–1994: North Carolina (GA)
- 1995: Western Carolina (GA)
- 1996: Albright (OL)
- 1997–2006: Albright
- 2007–2011: West Chester (RB)

Head coaching record
- Overall: 48–53

Accomplishments and honors

Championships
- 1 MAC Commonwealth Division (1997)

Edward "E. J." Sandusky (born c. 1969) is an American former college football coach. He was the head football coach for Albright College from 1997 to 2006. He also coached for North Carolina, Western Carolina, and West Chester. He played college football for Penn State as a center.

== Personal life ==
Sandusky is one of six adopted sons of former American football coach and convicted child sex offender Jerry Sandusky. He is also the brother of former National Football League (NFL) executive Jon Sandusky.

== Head coaching record ==
| Year | Team | Overall | Conference | Standing | Bowl/playoffs |
|---|---|---|---|---|---|
Albright Lions (Middle Atlantic Conference) (1997–2006)
| 1997 | Albright | 8–1 | 5–0 | 1st (Commonwealth) | |
| 1998 | Albright | 4–6 | 2–3 | T–4th (Commonwealth) | |
| 1999 | Albright | 3–7 | 2–3 | T–4th (Commonwealth) | |
| 2000 | Albright | 3–7 | 2–3 | T–3rd (Commonwealth) | |
| 2001 | Albright | 6–5 | 5–4 | 4th | |
| 2002 | Albright | 2–8 | 2–7 | T–8th | |
| 2003 | Albright | 7–3 | 6–3 | T–4th | |
| 2004 | Albright | 8–3 | 6–3 | T–3rd | |
| 2005 | Albright | 5–5 | 4–5 | T–7th | |
| 2006 | Albright | 2–8 | 2–7 | T–8th | |
| Albright: | | 48–53 | 36–38 | | |
| Total: | | 48–53 | | | |
National championship Conference title Conference division title or championship game berth
