= Jerry Sandusky =

American college football coach and convicted child sex offender (born 1944)

- Sandusky's mug shot, c. 2012
- Born: Gerald Arthur Sandusky; January 26, 1944 (age 82); Washington, Pennsylvania, U.S.
- Occupation: College football coach (retired)
- Spouse: Dottie Gross (m. 1966)
- Children: 6
- Status: Incarcerated at State Correctional Institution – Laurel Highlands; earliest possible release October 9, 2042
- Conviction: June 22, 2012
- Criminal charges: Involuntary deviant sexual intercourse, indecent assault, criminal intent to commit indecent assault, unlawful contact with minors, corruption of minors, endangering welfare of children
- Penalty: 30 to 60 years in prison, sentenced on October 9, 2012
- Coaching career

Playing career
- 1963–1965: Penn State
- Position: Defensive end

Coaching career (HC unless noted)
- 1966: Penn State (GA)
- 1967: Juniata (assistant)
- 1968: Boston University (assistant)
- 1969: Penn State (DL)
- 1970–1976: Penn State (LB)
- 1977–1999: Penn State (DC/LB)

Accomplishments and honors

Awards
- Pennsylvania Sports Hall of Fame

Gerald Arthur Sandusky (born January 26, 1944) is an American convicted serial child molester and retired college football coach.

Sandusky served as an assistant coach for his entire career, mostly at Pennsylvania State University under Joe Paterno. Sandusky was an assistant coach at Penn State from 1969 to 1999, where he served as defensive coordinator for the final 22 years of his career. He received "Assistant Coach of the Year" awards in 1986 and 1999. Sandusky authored several books related to his football coaching experiences.

In 1977, Sandusky founded The Second Mile, a non-profit charity serving Pennsylvania's underprivileged and at-risk youth. Following his 1999 retirement from Penn State, he continued working with the Second Mile at Penn State and maintained an office at the university until 2011.

In 2011, following a two-year grand jury investigation, Sandusky was arrested and charged with 52 counts of sexual abuse of young boys over a 15-year period from 1994 to 2009. Sandusky met his molestation victims through the Second Mile. Several of his victims later testified against Sandusky in his sexual abuse trial. Four of the charges were subsequently dropped.

On June 22, 2012, Sandusky was found guilty on 45 of the 48 remaining charges. Sandusky was sentenced on October 9, 2012, to 30 to 60 years in prison. He has been incarcerated in the Pennsylvania prison system since October 31, 2012.

== Early life and education ==
Sandusky was born in Washington, Pennsylvania, on January 26, 1944, the only son of Evelyn Mae (née Lee), an Irish Catholic homemaker who came from a small Pennsylvania coal mining town, and Arthur Sandusky, whose parents, Edward and Josephine Sendecki, were immigrants from Poland who moved to East Vandergrift, Pennsylvania.

Sandusky's father Arthur worked with youth service programs for over 30 years, mostly as director of the Brownson House in Washington, Pennsylvania, a community recreation center for children. His father founded the Pennsylvania Junior Wrestling program, and created junior basketball, volleyball, boxing, and football programs for Brownson House. He improved its facilities, adding a new playground, gym, outdoor basketball court, and a renovated football field. He managed the 1955 Washington, Pennsylvania baseball team that won the Pony League World Series championship, the only team from Washington to win that championship. Arthur was inducted into the Pennsylvania Sports Hall of Fame in 1989.

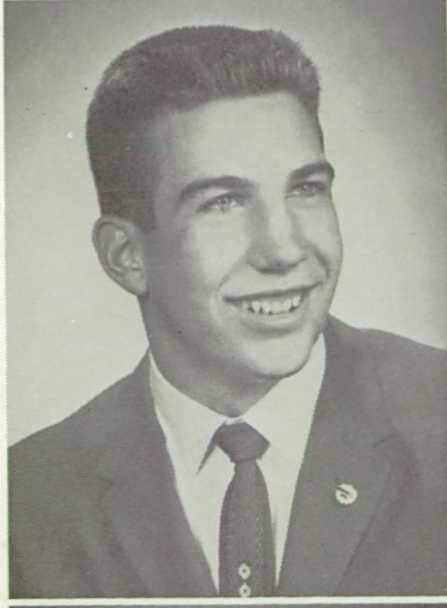
Sandusky at Washington High School (c. 1962)

At home, Jerry Sandusky adopted his own personal code called "Jer's Law", which he observed for many years. The rules adopted were that Sandusky could be mischievous but not to the point where someone could be intentionally hurt. He also vowed to not be disrespectful to his teachers, and he swore to himself that he would tell the truth if he was caught breaking any rules. Sandusky is a fan of the 1994 film Forrest Gump. He confided to one of his victims that he identifies with the title character. Sandusky signed off at least one of his letters to his victim as "Forrest Jer."

Sandusky attended Washington High School, where he was a good student and standout athlete, playing baseball, basketball, and football. He was a leader on his junior high basketball team that went undefeated through the Western Pennsylvania Interscholastic Athletic League playoffs in his final season there. Sandusky's classmates during this period describe him as a studious "loner" who "never dated in high school" but was a popular and handsome athlete.

Sandusky attended Penn State, where he played college football under Rip Engle for the Nittany Lions, starting at defensive end from 1963 to 1965. In 1966, Sandusky graduated first in his class with a B.S. in health in 1966 and obtained a second degree in physical education in 1970.

== Personal life ==
In 1966, Sandusky married Dorothy "Dottie" (née Gross), and together they adopted six children. Sandusky and his wife also served as foster parents. One of Sandusky's sons, Jon Sandusky, was director of player personnel for the Cleveland Browns from 2010 to 2014. Another son, E. J. Sandusky, was an assistant football coach at West Chester University. Sandusky described his family as "old fashioned", and his wife Dottie as the family's leader.

Matt Sandusky, one of Sandusky's children and a former foster child of Sandusky's, released a statement through his attorney, Andrew Shubin, that stated that Sandusky had sexually molested Matt as a child. The statement was released on the day the jury began deliberations in the sex abuse trial against Sandusky.

On February 13, 2017, another of Sandusky's adopted children, his son Jeffrey (Jeff), was arrested and charged with sexual assault of a child and possession of child pornography, and entered a plea deal while awaiting trial in September 2017, with sentencing scheduled for December 2017. On December 8, 2017, he was given a sentence of three-and-a-half to six years in prison after "pleading guilty to pressuring a teenage girl to send him naked photos and asking her teen sister to perform a sex act."

Jerry Sandusky was a member of St. Paul's United Methodist Church in State College.

== Career ==
=== Early coaching career ===
Sandusky served as a graduate assistant under Paterno at Penn State in 1966. He was the assistant basketball and track coach at Juniata College in 1967 and the offensive line coach at Boston University in 1968.

=== Coaching career at Penn State ===
He returned to Penn State in 1969 and remained there as an assistant coach until his retirement at the end of the 1999 season. Sandusky served as defensive line coach in 1969, became linebacker coach in 1970, and was promoted to defensive coordinator in 1977, holding that position until his retirement. In his years as a linebacker coach and defensive coordinator, he coached many defensive squads, and Penn State gained a reputation for outstanding linebacker play, producing 10 first-team All-Americans at that position, and acquiring the nickname "Linebacker U". Jack Ham and LaVar Arrington were two of the noted pro football greats to emerge from his teams.

Upon his retirement, Sandusky was awarded "both an unusual compensation package and a special designation of 'emeritus' rank that carried special privileges, including access to the university's recreational facilities." Spanier approved a lump-sum payment to Sandusky of $168,000. His final game coaching at Penn State was a notable game for Sandusky. Penn State faced Texas A&M in the 1999 Alamo Bowl in San Antonio, Texas. The Nittany Lions' defense shut out Texas A&M, 24–0, the only bowl game shutout victory for Penn State under Paterno.

== The Second Mile ==
After retirement, Sandusky hosted many summer football camps and was active in the Second Mile, a children's charity he founded in State College, Pennsylvania, in 1977.

President George H. W. Bush praised the group as a "shining example" of charity work in a 1990 letter, one of that president's much-promoted "Thousand points of light" encouragements to volunteer community organizations.

Citing Sandusky's work with the Second Mile charity to provide care for foster children, then U.S. Senator Rick Santorum honored Sandusky with an Angels in Adoption award in 2002. On November 15, 2011, the Congressional Coalition on Adoption Institute, a non-profit adoption awareness organization, rescinded its 2002 Angels in Adoption award to Jerry and Dorothy Sandusky. Santorum, then running for the Republican nomination for President, said he was "devastated" by the scandal.

Former Eagles head coaches Dick Vermeil and Andy Reid, former Phillies owner Ruly Carpenter, Matt Millen from ESPN, actor Mark Wahlberg, Arnold Palmer, and football player Franco Harris, among others, served on the Honorary Board of Second Mile.

During the time period that Sandusky was being investigated by the Office of the Attorney General, investigators served subpoenas on the Second Mile to get records of boys who had been through the program as well as Sandusky's travel and expense records. The records from 2000 to 2003 were missing. Recordkeepers later found files for one year, but the records for the other three years were never found.

== Child sex abuse scandal ==
=== Investigation and charges ===
An investigation was initiated by the Pennsylvania Attorney General's Office into sexual abuse allegations against Sandusky in 2008. The charges were initiated at Central Mountain High School, where a student made allegations of abuse against Sandusky.

On November 4, 2011, a grand jury that had been convened in September 2009, or earlier, indicted Sandusky on 40 counts of sex crimes against young boys. The indictment came after a three-year investigation that explored allegations of Sandusky having inappropriate contact with an underage boy over the course of four years, beginning when the boy was ten years old. The boy's parents reported the incident to police in 2009. The grand jury identified eight boys who had been singled out for sexual advances or sexual assaults by Sandusky, taking place from 1994 through 2009. At least 20 of the incidents allegedly took place while Sandusky was still employed at Penn State.

According to the first indictment, in 2002 assistant coach Mike McQueary, then a Penn State graduate assistant, said he walked in on Sandusky anally raping a 10-year-old boy. The next day, McQueary reported the incident to head coach Joe Paterno. (Later while testifying during the Sandusky trial, McQueary spoke about what he had relayed to Paterno: "I told him and I want to make sure I'm clear. I made sure he knew it was sexual and wrong. There was no doubt.") Paterno told McQueary at the time, "You did what you had to do. It is my job now to figure out what we want to do." At the preliminary hearing for Tim Curley and Gary Schultz, McQueary testified that Paterno was "shocked and saddened, kind of slumped back on his chair." He said that Paterno told him: "'I'm sorry you had to see that. It's terrible.' And he said, 'I need to think and tell some people about what you saw and I'll let you know what ... what we'll do next.'" Paterno then informed Penn State athletic director Tim Curley. At the preliminary hearing, McQueary also testified that he "believed" Sandusky was having "some type of intercourse" with the boy. He said that this was based on "the positioning" of Sandusky and the boy, but that he never saw "insertion" or "penetration" and is not "100 percent sure" that intercourse was occurring.

Curley and senior vice president for finance and business Gary Schultz (who oversaw the Penn State police department) called McQueary to a meeting a week-and-a-half later. In McQueary's testimony he stated that during the meeting he relayed in "graphic detail" what he had witnessed in the locker room showers at the Lasch Building. At the preliminary hearing of Curley and Schultz, McQueary testified that he would have given Curley and Schultz a "rough idea" of the body positions of the individuals in the shower, and would have described the activity as "extremely sexual and I thought some kind of intercourse was going on."

The indictment accused Curley and Schultz not only of failing to tell the police, but also of falsely telling the grand jury that McQueary never informed them of the alleged sexual activity.

On November 5, 2011, Sandusky was arrested and charged with seven counts of involuntary deviant sexual intercourse, eight counts of corruption of minors, eight counts of endangering the welfare of a child, seven counts of indecent assault, and other offenses.

The prosecution charged Curley and Schultz with perjury and failure to report suspected child abuse by Sandusky.

On November 6, 2011, Penn State banned Sandusky from campus. His bail conditions did not include restrictions on his travel.

In December 2011, Sandusky was charged with an additional 12 counts of sexual crimes against children. The grand jury's second presentment charged Sandusky with an additional count of involuntary deviate sexual intercourse and two additional counts of unlawful contact with a minor. The additional victims, known only as "Victim 9" and "Victim 10," were participants in Sandusky's youth program and were between the ages of 10 and 12 at the time of the sexual assaults.

On December 7, 2011, Sandusky was arrested for a second time based on the additional sexual abuse charges. Sandusky was released on $250,000 bail and placed on monitored house arrest while he awaited trial.

=== Pre-trial interviews ===
On November 14, in a televised phone interview on NBC's Rock Center with Brian Williams, Sandusky admitted to correspondent Bob Costas to having showered with underage boys and touching their bodies, as he described it "without intent of sexual contact." Sandusky denied being a pedophile. The interview received substantial coverage in the media, particularly regarding the manner in which Sandusky answered Costas when asked if he is sexually attracted to young boys:

COSTAS: "Are you sexually attracted to young boys, to underage boys?"

SANDUSKY: "Am I sexually attracted to underage boys?"

COSTAS: "Yes."

SANDUSKY: "Sexually attracted, you know, I enjoy young people. I love to be around them... But no, I'm not sexually attracted to young boys."

In the days following the interview, several potential victims contacted State College lawyer Andy Shubin to tell their stories, with one claiming Sandusky had abused him in the 1970s.

In a taped interview with Jo Becker of The New York Times on December 3, 2011, Sandusky and his lawyer, Joe Amendola, attempted to clarify the remarks he made in the November 14 interview:

SANDUSKY: "I was sitting there like, 'what in the world is this question?' am I going to be, if I say, 'no I'm not attracted to boys,' that's not the truth because I'm attracted to young people -- boys, girls."

AMENDOLA (off-camera): "Yeah but not sexually, you're attracted to them as in you like spending time with them."

SANDUSKY: "Right, I enjoy, that's what I'm trying to clarify, I enjoy spending time with young people. I enjoy spending time with people. I mean, my two favorite groups are the elderly and the young. The young because they don't think about what they say and the old because they don't care, you know?"

During the same interview, Sandusky responded to the initial 40 charges of sexual crimes against children:

BECKER: "You must have some theory, without getting into individual cases or naming names."

SANDUSKY: "You would have to, to have my understanding of that. What I think? I mean, what I think are that these are individual matters. These kids, some of them, I know them. Some of them. I don't know all of them. [lawyer Amendola interjects 'we're assuming']. We're assuming we know them. Two of the kids. My gut feeling would be that they got pulled into this."

=== Trial ===
The trial, for 52 charges of sexual crimes against children, started on June 11, 2012, at the Centre County Courthouse in Bellefonte, Pennsylvania. State Deputy Attorney General and former homicide prosecutor Joseph E. McGettigan III, led the prosecution team for the Commonwealth; defense attorney Joseph Amendola was Sandusky's lead attorney for the defense team; and Senior Judge John Cleland presided.

Over the course of the trial that lasted eight days, jurors heard from eight witnesses who testified that Sandusky sexually abused them. Jurors also heard testimony about assaults committed against two other victims who were never identified. Of the eight males who gave testimony, each explained that they met Sandusky through the Second Mile organization; their individual accounts spanned from the mid-1990s until 2009. The witnesses testified to similar stories of being abused in the football locker room showers or in the basement of Sandusky's home.

The first prosecution witness, identified in media reports as "Victim 4," described detailed accounts of many instances of sexual abuse, including forced oral and anal sex, by Sandusky while the witness was a participant in Sandusky's Second Mile charitable organization. According to "Victim 4," he was sexually abused by Sandusky as many as three times a week for three years, beginning when he was 13 years old. The witness further testified that when he attempted to distance himself from Sandusky, Sandusky offered the boy a contract for money to continue spending time with him.

On the second day of trial, "Victim 1", the youngest of Sandusky's alleged victims, testified to over 20 incidents of abuse, including forced oral sex, by Sandusky during 2007 and 2008 while the boy was a participant in Sandusky's Second Mile program. The boy was 11 or 12 years old when the sexual abuse started. Mike McQueary, former Penn State graduate assistant football coach, testified that in 2001 in a Penn State locker room, he heard "skin on skin" slapping sounds coming from the showers. McQueary testified that he then saw Sandusky naked behind a 10- to 12-year-old boy propped against a shower wall, with "Sandusky's arms wrapped around the boy's midsection in the closest proximity that I think you could be in."

On June 14, "Victim 9" alleged that he spent almost every weekend at Sandusky's house, between 100 and 150 times, and that rape happened "often" between the ages of 13 and 16. He testified that Sandusky would come downstairs to his basement and force him to perform oral sex and anal sex. He testified that he would scream, hoping that Sandusky's wife would hear him upstairs, but said "I think the basement is soundproof".

Sandusky's defense attorneys argued that the accusers were driven by financial motives. The defense also pointed out some of the accusers had changed their stories and that some of them continued a relationship with Sandusky after the alleged abuse (one went to a football game with Sandusky shortly before his arrest, another brought his girlfriend to meet Sandusky). A psychiatrist testifying for the defense, Dr. Eliot Atkins, diagnosed Sandusky with histrionic personality disorder, a disorder characterized by attention-seeking behavior and exaggerated emotions. Atkins testified that the letters written by Sandusky to the accusers were consistent with this disorder, rather than "grooming" behavior as alleged by the prosecution.

On June 18, 2012, it was reported that during the full-day court recess the previous Friday, prosecutors had contacted NBC "asking the network to re-authenticate a full unedited transcript" of the Bob Costas interview from November. An unaired portion of the Costas interview featured Sandusky saying, "I didn't go around seeking out every young person for sexual needs that I've helped". Legal analysts explained that this could be used by the prosecution to cross-examine Sandusky if he were to take the stand.

On June 21, 2012, after the case had gone to the jury, Matt Sandusky, one of Sandusky's six adopted children, stated through his attorney that he was also a victim of the former coach's sexual abuse. He had been ready to testify for the prosecution, but did not do so. Later, Amendola said that Jerry Sandusky had every intention of testifying in his own defense, but decided against it because he claimed that the prosecution would have called Matt to the stand.

Subsequently, sources close to the investigation conducted by the Office of the State attorney general have stated that the prosecutor never threatened to have Matt Sandusky testify at trial, and that "prosecutor Joseph McGettigan relished the opportunity of taking-on Jerry Sandusky in cross examination and had promised Amendola early on that they would not call any additional rebuttal witnesses".

=== Verdict and sentencing ===
The jury, consisting of seven women and five men, many with direct ties to Penn State, deliberated for 21 hours over two days. On the evening of June 22, 2012, the jury reached its verdict, finding Sandusky guilty on 45 of the 48 counts against him. Specifically, Sandusky was convicted of the following charges and counts: eight counts of involuntary deviate sexual intercourse, seven counts of indecent assault, one count of criminal intent to commit indecent assault, nine counts of unlawful contact with minors, 10 counts of corruption of minors and 10 counts of endangering the welfare of children. Cleland immediately revoked Sandusky's bail and remanded him to the Centre County Correctional Facility to await sentencing.

Sandusky faced a maximum sentence of 442 years in prison. According to NBC News' Michael Isikoff, Sandusky faced a minimum sentence of 60 years under Pennsylvania sentencing guidelines — at his age, effectively a life sentence. A sentencing hearing was expected 90 days from the date of conviction. On September 17, it was announced that Sandusky would be sentenced on October 9.

Sandusky's statement the evening before his sentencing

On the evening before his sentencing hearing, Sandusky released an audio statement maintaining his innocence. The next day, Cleland sentenced Sandusky to 60 years in prison–as mentioned above, the minimum possible sentence under Pennsylvania law. He will not be eligible for parole until he serves at least 30 years. Sandusky's earliest possible release date will be October 9, 2042, when he will be 98 years old. In pronouncing the sentence, Cleland said that Sandusky was a particularly dangerous breed of child molester because he masked his manipulation and abuse of children behind a respectable facade. "It is the remarkable ability to conceal that makes these crimes so heinous," he said. While acknowledging Sandusky's "positive work," Cleland called him a "dangerous" child molester who should never be allowed to be free again. At the same hearing, Cleland granted prosecutors' request to have Sandusky declared a "sexually violent predator" under Pennsylvania's version of Megan's Law. This would subject him to stringent reporting requirements if he is released. Sandusky would not only have to report his address to police every three months for the rest of his life, but would also have to participate in a court-approved counseling program; however, this designation will likely be academic since as mentioned above, Sandusky will almost certainly die in prison. Earlier, on August 30, the Pennsylvania Sexual Offenders Assessment Board had recommended that Sandusky be declared a sexually violent predator. He was fined costs and fees of $5,675.44 in Commonwealth of Pennsylvania v. Sandusky (CP-14-CR-0002421-2011) and costs, fees, and restitution of $194,078.06 in Commonwealth of Pennsylvania v. Sandusky (CP-14-CR-0002422-2011).

=== Reaction ===
Penn State became the subject of significant media criticism because several members of its staff allegedly covered up Sandusky's assaults. Maureen Dowd wrote of the scandal: "Like the Roman Catholic Church hierarchy, the Penn State hierarchy appears to have covered up pedophile crimes to protect its brand."

In June 2012, Penn State University implemented a policy to require mandatory reporting of child abuse by any Penn State employee working with children. The policy also requires all Penn State employees working with children to go through a background check and training related to child abuse and reporting requirements.

=== Freeh report ===
The Penn State Board of Trustees commissioned a report by a special investigative group headed by former Federal Bureau of Investigation Director Louis Freeh. After interviewing over 400 people and reviewing over 3.5 million documents, the crux of the report's findings, which were released July 12, 2012, state:

Taking into account the available witness statements and evidence, the Special Investigative Counsel finds that it is more reasonable to conclude that, in order to avoid the consequences of bad publicity, the most powerful leaders at the University — Spanier, Schultz, Paterno and Curley — repeatedly concealed critical facts relating to Sandusky's child abuse from authorities, the University's Board of Trustees, the Penn State community, and the public at large.

The Freeh Report states that although the "avoidance of the consequences of bad publicity" was the main driver in failing to protect child abuse victims and report to authorities, the report outlines other causes as well, among which were: "A striking lack of empathy for child abuse victims by the most senior leaders of the University"; a failure of oversight by the board of trustees; a University President "who discouraged discussion and dissent"; "a lack of awareness of child abuse issues"; and "a culture of reverence for the football program that is ingrained at all levels of the campus community".

The report outlines how all four men were aware of the 1998 abuse incident in the locker-room shower, and had followed its investigation at the time. Freeh's investigation uncovered a file kept by Schultz in which he wrote notes about Sandusky's 1998 incident. For instance, Schultz wrote: "Is this opening of Pandora's box?" He also wondered, "other children?" Freeh stated that Schultz had "actively sought to conceal those records".

The evidentiary weight of Freeh's report draws heavily upon retrieved emails from 1998 and 2001, which Freeh referred to as "the most important evidence" in the report. The report asserts that these emails demonstrate that in 1998 Paterno knew of the investigation of Sandusky, and followed it closely; and suggest that it was Paterno, "long regarded as the single most powerful official at the university," who persuaded Spanier, Curley, and Schultz not to formally report Sandusky to law enforcement or child welfare authorities. According to The New York Times, the university's handling of the 2001 report of Sandusky raping a young boy is "one of the most damning episodes laid out by Mr. Freeh's investigation ..."

The report states that nobody took any "responsible action after February 2001 other than Curley informing the Second Mile that Mr. Sandusky had showered with a boy" and then telling Sandusky not to bring his "guests" into the Penn State facilities; but the topic of sexual abuse was not broached with Sandusky.

The report criticizes Paterno for his failure to "alert the entire football staff, in order to prevent Sandusky from bringing another child into the Lasch Building".

According to details in the report, despite being aware of Sandusky's sexual misconduct with young boys in the locker-room showers in the Lasch Building in 1998, and 2001, Spanier, Paterno, Curley, and Schultz never restricted Sandusky's access to Penn State facilities. The report states that Sandusky had access to the Lasch Building until November 2011. Over the next ten-year period, Sandusky "was frequently at the Lasch Building working out, showing up at campus events that Penn State supported ... He was showering with young boys, staying in dormitories ... There are more red flags than you could count, over a long period of time." Consequently, out of the 10 young boys that Sandusky would be convicted of sexually assaulting, most of them were abused after he was investigated in 1998 — at least five of them were assaulted "at Penn State's football facilities and other places on campus after May 1998". After his retirement in 1999, the report notes that Sandusky continued to have "unrestricted and unsupervised access to the University's facilities and affiliation with the university's prominent football program. Indeed, the continued access provided Sandusky with the very currency that enabled him to attract his victims".

Beyond the question of building access, the report details that as part of Sandusky's retirement agreement he could "continue to work with young people through Penn State" for more than a decade, including Second Mile events on campus, youth football camps, etc.

At the July 12 press conference announcing the report's findings, Freeh stated in his prepared remarks: "The most powerful men at Penn State failed to take any steps for 14 years to protect the children Sandusky victimized." He said they "never demonstrated, through actions or words, any concern for the safety and well-being of Sandusky's victims" until after he was arrested in 2011.

=== Further allegations and investigations ===
In 2011, ABC News reported that officials in San Antonio were conducting a probe of allegations that Sandusky engaged in child sex abuse while in San Antonio for the 1999 Alamo Bowl. The report indicated that Sandusky could face criminal charges in Texas.

In 2012, The Patriot-News reported that Sandusky could face federal charges for allegedly molesting boys in San Antonio and in Tampa in 1999. Although these allegations were spelled out in the state indictment, federal authorities have jurisdiction over any crime that crosses a state line.

In July 2012, PennLive.com reported that three men had told police that they were abused by Sandusky in the 1970s or 1980s. They were the first alleged victims to claim that Sandusky had engaged in sex abuse before the 1990s.

In August 2012, CBS News also reported that the United States Postal Inspection Service was leading an investigation to see whether Sandusky sent child pornography through the mail across state lines. According to one source, child pornography was found on at least one of Sandusky's computers.

On August 24, 2012, as reported by the Associated Press, the individual known as "Victim 1" who testified at the trial of Sandusky brought suit against Pennsylvania State University. They reported that the suit charged the university's conduct with regard to the complaints that Sandusky had acted towards boys with sexual impropriety was "deliberate and shameful", saying that Penn State engaged in "purposeful, deliberate and shameful subordination of the safety of children to its economic self-interests, and to its interest in maintaining and perpetuating its reputation."

In September 2012, former Philadelphia child prostitute Greg Bucceroni alleged that in 1979 and 1980 Philadelphia philanthropist Ed Savitz brought him from his New Jersey residence to a State College Second Mile fund raiser for the purpose of child trafficking.

In October 2012, KDKA-TV reported that individuals had claimed that Sandusky had assaulted them during the 1960s while he was living at the Brownson House in Washington, Pennsylvania.

=== Imprisonment and post-trial motions ===
On October 18, 2012, Sandusky's lawyers moved for a new trial in Centre County Court in Pennsylvania. They argued that they did not have enough time to prepare for their client's case.

On October 23, 2012, Sandusky was transferred to Camp Hill state prison in Cumberland County, Pennsylvania, for pre-imprisonment evaluation. He was then moved to Greene state prison in Franklin Township, where most of the state's life and capital inmates are housed, on October 31, 2012, to serve his sentence. He was housed in protective custody.

On January 30, 2013, Pennsylvania Judge John Cleland denied Sandusky's motion for a new trial.

Sandusky was transferred to SCI Somerset, a medium-security prison outside Somerset, Pennsylvania, in March 2017. As of May 2017, he was serving his sentence at SCI Laurel Highlands, a minimum security facility near Pittsburgh that primarily serves ill or elderly inmates.

In March 2023, PennLive.com reported that Sandusky's attorneys had again moved for a new trial. They argued that "newly-discovered evidence of State College attorney Andrew Shubin’s work with two separate civil clients gives new weight to defense claims that lawyers, counselors and police were actively coaching people into making allegations" against Sandusky. The motion was denied.

On September 26, 2025, Sandusky filed his third Petition for Post Conviction Collateral Relief in both criminal cases against him (CP-14-CR-0002421-2011 and CP-14-CR-0002422-2011). Both petitions were dismissed on March 5, 2026, by the Hon. Maureen A. Skerda, Judge of the 37th Judicial District and its 26th President Judge.

== Publications and interviews ==
Sandusky co-wrote an autobiography titled Touched: The Jerry Sandusky Story (ISBN 9781582612706), which was published in 2001. His co-writer was Keith "Kip" Richeal. The book also includes a quote in a foreword from football coach Dick Vermeil about Sandusky: "He could very well be the Will Rogers of the coaching profession."

Other books by Sandusky include:

- Developing linebackers the Penn State way, Leisure Press, 1981; ISBN 978-0-918438-64-5
- Coaching linebackers, with Cedric X. Bryant. Coaches Choice Books, 1995; ISBN 978-1-57167-059-5
- 101 linebacker drills, with Cedric X. Bryant. Coaches Choice Books, 1997; ISBN 978-1-57167-087-8

Sandusky granted his first interview for television since his conviction on NBC's Today show on March 25, 2013.
