= LGBTQ rights in Pennsylvania =

- Pennsylvania (US)
- Legal status: Legal since 1980
- Gender identity: Transgender individuals allowed to change legal gender on birth certificate and driver's license
- Discrimination protections: Sexual orientation and gender identity protections

Family rights
- Recognition of relationships: Same-sex marriage since 2014
- Adoption: Yes

Lesbian, gay, bisexual, transgender, and queer (LGBTQ) people in the U.S. state of Pennsylvania enjoy most of the same rights as non-LGBTQ people. Same-sex sexual activity is legal in Pennsylvania. Same-sex couples and families headed by same-sex couples are eligible for all of the protections available to opposite-sex married couples. Pennsylvania was the final Mid-Atlantic state without same-sex marriage, indeed lacking any form of same-sex recognition law until its statutory ban was overturned on May 20, 2014.

Since June 2023, discrimination on the basis of sexual orientation and gender identity is explicitly banned in the state. Some cities and counties ban such discrimination, including Philadelphia, Pittsburgh, Allentown, Erie, and Reading (the five most populous cities in the state). Some cities and counties within Pennsylvania also ban conversion therapy on minors.

On June 15, 2020, in Bostock v. Clayton County, Georgia, the U.S. Supreme Court ruled that discrimination in the workplace on the basis of sexual orientation or gender identity is discrimination on the basis of sex, and Title VII therefore protects LGBT employees from workplace discrimination.

Both Philadelphia and Pittsburgh have vibrant LGBT communities, having held pride parades since the 1970s and attracting more than 100,000 attendees as of 2017. In June 2024, the Presbyterian SeniorCare Network announced plans to build a housing complex designed for elderly LGBTQ+ people in Pittsburgh. In March 2025, the state Supreme Court explicitly ruled that same-sex couples must have “equal legal parentage obligations for their children” from IVF treatment as heterosexual couples.

== Legality of same-sex sexual activity ==
Pennsylvania has repealed its sodomy statutes incrementally. In 1972, legislation legalized consensual sodomy for heterosexual married couples. In 1980, the Supreme Court of Pennsylvania ruling in Commonwealth v. Bonadio found Pennsylvania's sodomy law unconstitutional as violating the equal protection guarantees of both the state and federal constitutions. Pennsylvania repealed its remaining sodomy laws in 1995. In December 2021, an 81 year old gay man within Pennsylvania went to jail due to an “archaic sexual deviant law without trial” for nearly 2 years because he had oral sex within a nursing home, which staff alleged was non-consensual.

In July 2026, the Governor of Pennsylvania signed Senate Bill 45, an anti-human trafficking bill that also repealed a 1982 that allowed prosecutors to charge people with HIV infections who engaged in prostitution with a felony rather than a misdemeanor.

=== Obscenity statute ===
In March 2021, the small township of Upper Darby discovered a 1987 anti-obscenity ordinance which defined "sexual conduct" as including "acts of masturbation, homosexuality, sexual intercourse, sexual bestiality" and other sexual conduct. Arguing that a law against the public display of "acts of homosexuality" to minors could be read broadly to make even a Pride Parade "obscene" under the ordinance, local activist Damien Christopher Warsavage led the charge to have the ordinance repealed in its entirety, which succeeded. During this process, the town discovered that this ordinance paralleled a state obscenity law (18 PA 5903 ), which led to two votes in May 2021 at the Pennsylvania General Assembly to remove "acts of homosexuality" from the statute. Both votes failed. In July 2022, the Pennsylvania General Assembly passed a bill unanimously in both houses to repeal the archaic two word references "homosexuality" - within the criminal code of Pennsylvania (listed under obscenity). The Governor of Pennsylvania Tom Wolf signed the bill into law and went into effect immediately in the same month.

== Recognition of same-sex relationships ==
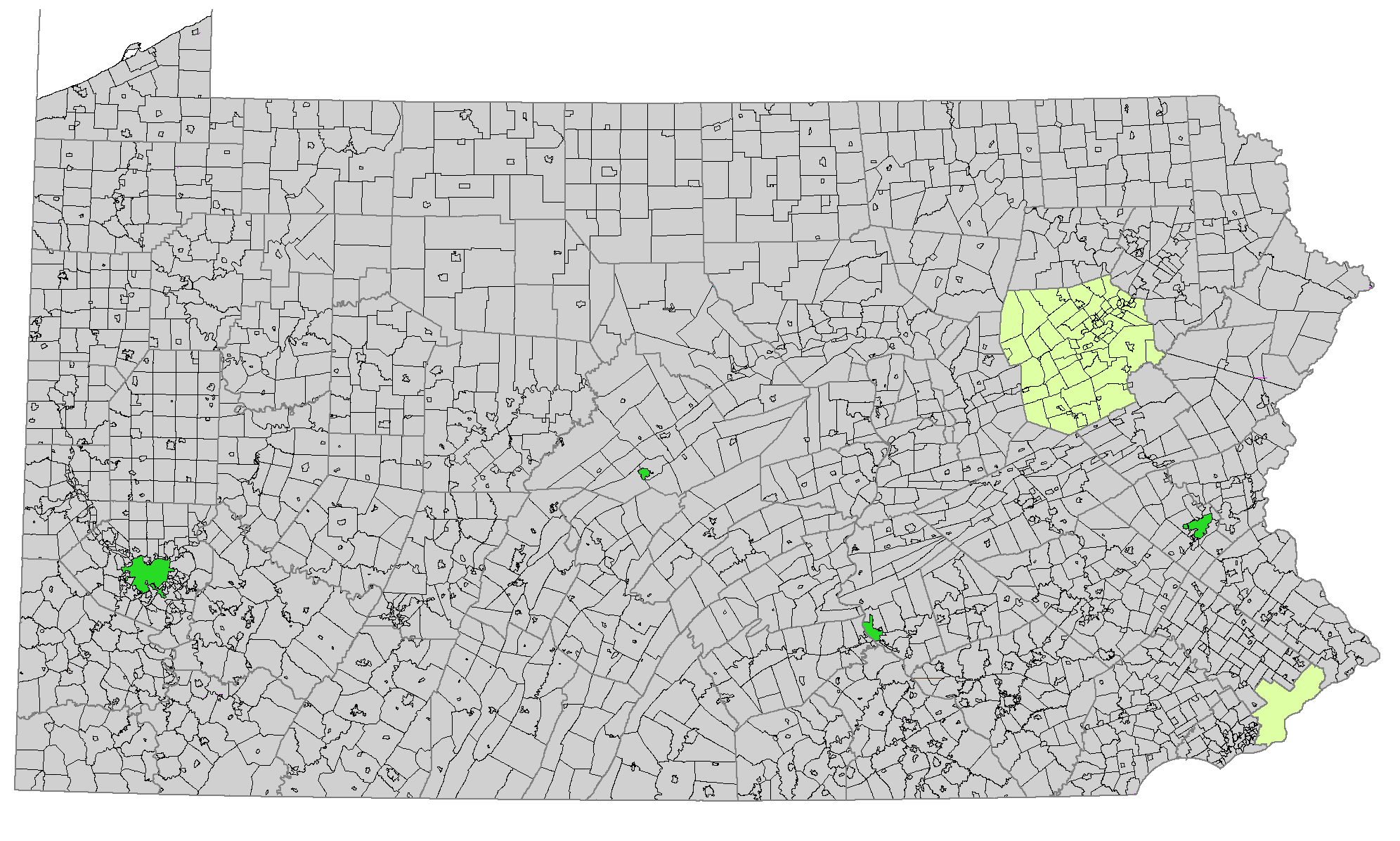
Map of Pennsylvania counties, cities, and boroughs that offer domestic partner benefits either county-wide or in particular cities. City offers domestic partner benefits County-wide partner benefits through domestic partnership County or city does not offer domestic partner benefits

Same-sex marriage was legalized in Pennsylvania on May 20, 2014, when U.S. District Court Judge John E. Jones III ruled in Whitewood v. Wolf that the state's statutory ban on such marriages was unconstitutional. After the ACLU filed the lawsuit in federal court on July 9, 2013, Attorney General Kathleen Kane said she would refuse to defend the statute.

Previously, Pennsylvania did not recognize same-sex marriages, civil unions, or domestic partnerships. Attempts had been made in recent years to allow for such unions. There had also been attempts to amend the State Constitution to prohibit same-sex marriage.

=== Local domestic partnerships ===
While domestic partnerships were never offered statewide, the city of Philadelphia offers 'life partnerships' in the case of a "long-term committed relationship between two unmarried individuals of the same gender who are residents of the city; or one of whom is employed in the city, owns real property in the city, owns and operates a business in the city, or is a recipient of or has a vested interest in employee benefits from the City of Philadelphia." The city of Pittsburgh also provides domestic partnerships. County employees in Luzerne County are required to identify if they are in a domestic partnership, which is explicitly defined as being between people of the same gender.

== Adoption and parenting ==
In March 2025, the Pennsylvania Supreme Court explicitly ruled that same-sex couples must have the same legal basic rights as heterosexual couples - who raise children “within an established household agreement on IVF parentage”, regardless of marital status.

Pennsylvania allows a single person to adopt without respect to sexual orientation.

Until 2002, Pennsylvania did not permit stepchild adoption by a person of the same sex as the first parent. A 6-0 ruling by the Supreme Court of Pennsylvania established the right of same-sex couples to stepchild adoptions. No statute prohibits a same-sex couple from adopting a child jointly.

== Hate crime law ==
Pennsylvania passed a hate crime law in 2002 that covered LGBTQ people, but the Pennsylvania Supreme Court struck it down in 2008 on a technicality: legislators inserted the language into an unrelated bill on agricultural terrorism, changing that bill's purpose during the legislative process, which violates the Pennsylvania Constitution. Legislation was introduced in several sessions to reinstate the law, but it never made it out of committee.

In April 2021, the Mayor of Pittsburgh Bill Peduto indicated that “he would sign a city-wide hate crime ordinance - to explicitly include sexual orientation, gender identity and disability, that goes much further than that of state law”.

== Discrimination protections ==
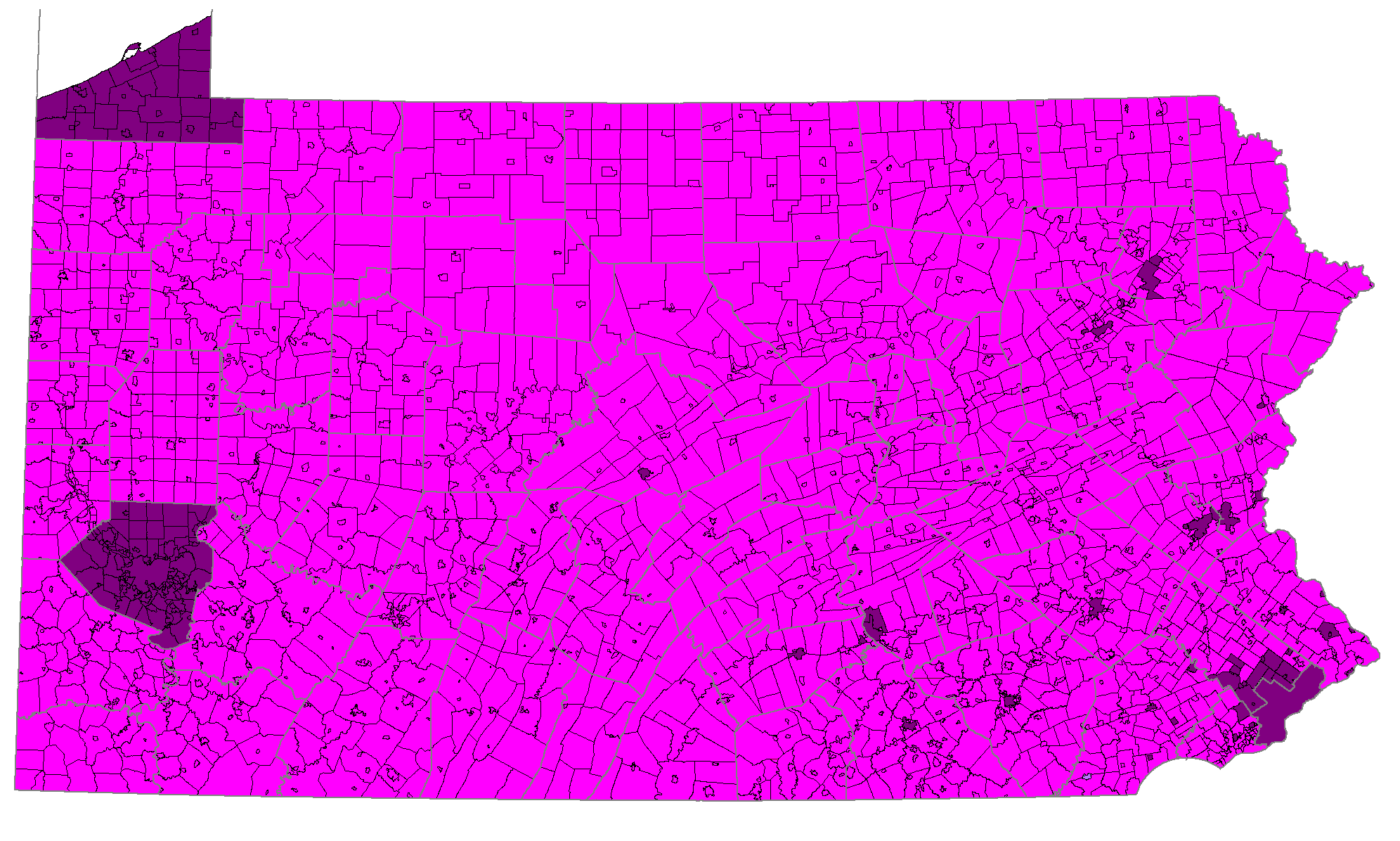
Map of Pennsylvania counties, cities, townships, boroughs, and unincorporated communities that have sexual orientation and/or gender identity anti–employment discrimination ordinances Sexual orientation and gender identity with anti–employment discrimination ordinance Sexual orientation with anti–employment discrimination ordinance and gender identity solely in public employment Sexual orientation and gender identity solely in state employment

There are statewide executive orders protecting LGBT individuals from workplace discrimination. In 1975, Pennsylvania became the first U.S. state in which an executive order was issued providing for discrimination protection on the basis of sexual orientation in state employment. In 2003, gender identity was added to this executive order and the order has been reissued by every governor since then. On April 7, 2016, Governor Tom Wolf signed two executive orders, the first order prohibiting discrimination against state employees based on their sexual orientation, gender identity, HIV status and other factors and the second mandate banning state contractors from discriminating against their LGBT employees.

For more than ten years, legislation that would protect LGBTQ people statewide from discrimination based on sexual orientation or gender identity has awaited action in the Pennsylvania General Assembly. On December 17, 2013, Governor Tom Corbett announced his support for such legislation with respect to sexual orientation after learning that federal law did not already provide such protection as he had previously thought. He said he anticipated bipartisan support for the legislation.

Many Pennsylvania municipalities and counties, including the five most populous cities, have enacted ordinances implementing such discrimination protections.

Since August 2018, discrimination based on both sexual orientation and gender identity has been interpreted by the Pennsylvania Human Relations Commission as being banned under the category of sex of the Pennsylvania Human Relations Act. LGBTQ people who have been discriminated against in employment, housing, education, and public accommodations can now file complaints with the Commission, which will investigate each complaint and can advise those responsible to stop a discriminatory practice, implement training, or award economic damages. Pennsylvania was the second state to achieve statewide LGBT protections this way, following Michigan in May 2018. In December 2022, with implemented legally-binding regulations added and signed off by the Governor Tom Wolf (during his last executive direction decision) - under the "definition of sex", also explicitly includes sexual orientation and gender identity.

In April 2023, a bill (HB300) formally passed the Pennsylvania House of Representatives by a vote of 102-98 that would explicitly legally ban discrimination on the basis of sexual orientation and gender identity or expression. The bill awaits a vote within the Pennsylvania Senate.

In May 2020, Pennsylvania became the only US jurisdiction to include both sexual orientation and gender identity in COVID-19 statistics and data collection.

=== 2020 ban on cannabis and LGBT pride flags ===
During the 2020 Pennsylvania General Assembly session, a Omnibus Budget Appropriations Bill that passed and was signed into law by Pennsylvania Governor Tom Wolf, it contained a ban on both cannabis and LGBT pride flags from flying at the Pennsylvania General Assembly that was "secretly added in" - it was not known or printed until right after the bill was signed into law.

== Gender identity and expression ==
Sex reassignment surgery is legal in the state.

=== Documents ===
In August 2016, the Pennsylvania Department of Health changed requirements for transgender people to change their gender on their birth certificates. Sex reassignment surgery is no longer a requirement. Instead, transgender persons will just have to present a note from a physician stating that they have had appropriate clinical treatment for gender transition. Additionally, children under 18 who wish to change their gender on their birth certificate will need their parents to make the request.

Since July 23, 2020, Pennsylvania has offered a third gender option (known as "X") on driver's licenses and state IDs. However, the third gender option is not possible on birth certificates.

=== Non-discrimination protections ===
In November 2019 three legal ordinances related to gender identity were signed into law by the Mayor of Philadelphia, Jim Kenney. These laws prohibit youth-serving organizations from discriminating against trans, nonbinary, and gender-nonconforming youth; require every city-owned building to have at least one gender-neutral bathroom; and clarify that the city's Fair Practice Ordinance protects nonbinary and gender-fluid people against discrimination. These laws only apply within the City of Philadelphia. In December 2021, all virtual public schools within the City of Philadelphia will include a selected legal non-binary gender X option alongside male and female.

In October 2023, Philadelphia officially became a "sanctuary city" - to transgender and non-binary individuals who want access, health and safety to services that is defended via an executive order.

=== Sports ===
In June 2022, a bill to ban transgender athletes from playing sports, athletics and Olympics on female teams passed both houses of the Pennsylvania General Assembly. Several US states have already legally implemented similar legislation. The Governor of Pennsylvania Tom Wolf vetoed the bill the next month in July 2022.

In May 2025 the Senate approved Senate Bill 9, the ‘Save Women’s Sports Act’ a bill which supporters claim will "protect women's sports" by mandating that athletes play on teams according to their gender assigned at birth.

=== Education ===
In October 2024, a Pennsylvania district court ruled that the Mt. Lebanon School District must allow parents the option to opt their children out of any lessons or classroom activities about "transgender identity".

== Conversion therapy ==
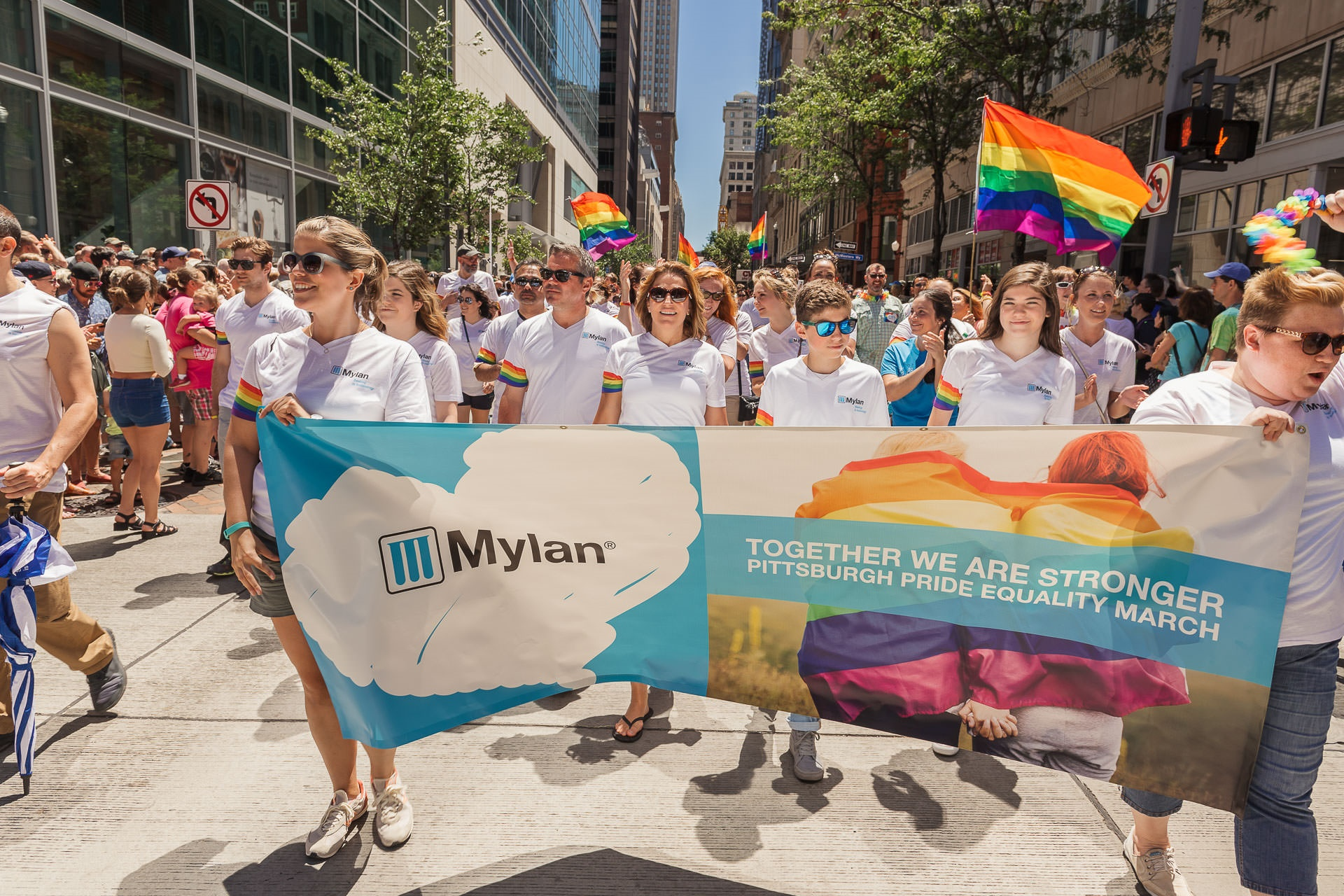
Mylan CEO Heather Bresch at the 2016 Pittsburgh Pride parade

A bill to ban the use of conversion therapy on LGBT minors in Pennsylvania was introduced in the General Assembly in April 2015. The bill had 20 sponsors, all of whom were Democrats, but it died without any legislative action.

On December 14, 2016, Pittsburgh became the first city in Pennsylvania to pass an ordinance that bans conversion therapy on minors. The ban was passed 9-0 and took effect on January 1, 2017. Philadelphia and Allentown followed suit in July 2017. Reading and Doylestown both enacted conversion therapy bans in December 2017.

State College passed a ban in February 2018, and Yardley did so the following month. Both Bellefonte and Bethlehem followed suit in July 2018.

Newtown Township, in Bucks County, unanimously voted to ban conversion therapy in November 2018. York also passed a local ordinance banning conversion therapy in August 2023.

In May 2024, 5 health boards within Pennsylvania implemented an explicit ban on conversion therapy - that applies to state-wide healthcare policies and regulations.

=== Executive order ===
In August 2022, the Governor of Pennsylvania Tom Wolf signed an executive order effective immediately - to legally ban any state-based government funding going towards conversion therapy for individuals within Pennsylvania. About 50% of the jurisdictions/states within the United States of America have already implemented explicit bans on conversion therapy - with either by legislation or executive order.

== Public opinion ==
A 2022 Public Religion Research Institute (PRRI) poll found that 68% of Pennsylvania residents support same-sex marriage, while 29% were opposed and 3% were unsure. The same poll found that 77% of Pennsylvania residents supported an anti-discrimination law covering sexual orientation and gender identity. 20% were opposed. Additionally, 65% were against allowing public businesses to refuse to serve LGBTQ people due to religious beliefs, while 33% support such religiously-based refusals.

== Summary table ==
Same-sex sexual activity legal with an equal age of consent	Yes (Since 1980; codified within 1995 and also 2022)
Anti-discrimination laws for sexual orientation and gender identity or expression	Yes (Since 2018 - Only tacitly interpreted as such by a court from previously existing non-discrimination laws of the state)
Same-sex marriage recognized legally	Yes (Since 2014)
Gays, lesbians and bisexuals allowed to serve in the military	Yes (Since 2011)
Transgender people allowed to serve openly in the military	No (Since 2025, via an executive order)
Transvestites allowed to serve openly in the military	No
Intersex people allowed to serve openly in the military	/ Yes (Current DoD policy bans "Hermaphrodites" from serving or enlisting in the military)
Third gender option	Yes (Since 2020, only on driver's licenses and state IDs - not birth certificates)
Access to Unisex Bathrooms	Yes
Automatic and equal “parentage rights” from adoption, surrogacy and IVF agreements for same-sex couples	Yes (Since 2025, via the Pennsylvania Supreme Court)
LGBT anti-bullying law in schools and colleges	No
LGBT-inclusive sex education mandatory within schools	No
Gay and trans panic defense banned	No
Homosexuality declassified as an illness	Yes (Since 1973)
Conversion therapy legally banned	Yes (Since 2024, by regulations and policies)
MSMs allowed to donate blood	Yes (Since 2023 - with conditions such as being monogamous)

== See also ==
- Law of Pennsylvania
- Equality Pennsylvania
- LGBT rights in the United States
