= James I. Brownson (judge) =

American judge

James Irwin Brownson Jr.

Judge of the Washington County Courts of Common Pleas
- In office 1918–1939
- Preceded by: Robert W. Irwin

Personal details
- Born: January 25, 1856
- Died: January 1, 1939 (aged 82) Hillview Sanitarium
- Education: Washington and Jefferson College

James Irwin Brownson Jr. (January 25, 1856 - January 1, 1939) was a judge in Pennsylvania. He was born in Washington, Pennsylvania on January 25, 1856.

== Biography ==
His father, Rev. Dr. James I. Brownson, served as pastor of the First Presbyterian Church of Washington for fifty years and as interim President of Washington & Jefferson College twice.

Brownson graduated from Washington and Jefferson College in 1875. He read law with the Alexander Wilson and was admitted to the Washington county bar in 1878. He worked at the law firm of AW & MC Acheson until 1889. He was in private practice from 1889 to 1902 before joining with partners to create Brownson, Donnan & Miller. He served as the solicitor of Washington County for 9 years.

He served as vice president of the Pennsylvania Bar Association in 1917. He was president of the board of trustees of Washington and Jefferson College. He was a member of the board of managers of the Pennsylvania Training School at Morganza.

He was appointed judge of Washington County Courts of Common Pleas on January 4, 1918; he was subsequently elected to a full term of ten years in November 1919. He eventually rose to become president judge.

He suffered a stroke in September 1938 while on the bench. He later died at the Hillview Sanitarium on January 1, 1939.

== Legacy ==
He had been involved Neighborhood House charity in Washington, purchasing the former Tyler Tube and Pipe Company for the charity's permanent location; upon his death, the charity was renamed Brownson House in his honor. Upon his death, it was renamed the Brownson House in his honor.
