= Whitewood v. Wolf =

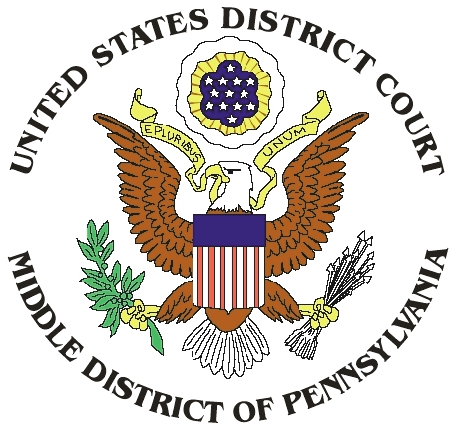
- District Court Docket: 1:13-cv-1861 Court of Appeals Docket: 14-3048
- Court: U.S. District Court for the Middle District of Pennsylvania
- Full case name: Deb Whitewood, et al., Plaintiffs, v. Michael Wolf, in his official capacity as Secretary, Pennsylvania Department of Health, et al., Defendants.
- Decided: May 20, 2014
- Citation: 992 F. Supp. 2d 410

Case history
- Subsequent actions: Petition for rehearing denied, No. 14-3048 (3d Cir. Aug. 4, 2014), application for stay denied sub nom. Santai-Gaffney v. Whitewood, No. 14A19 (U.S. Sup. Ct. July 9, 2014), denial of intervenor status summarily affirmed, appeal ordered dismissed, sub nom. Whitewood v. Secretary Pennsylvania Department of Health, No. 14-3048 (3d Cir. July 3, 2014); intervenor status denied (M.D. Pa. June 18, 2014)

Holding
- State enjoined from enforcing same-sex marriage ban; such bans violate the Fourteenth Amendment's Due Process and Equal Protection clauses.

Court membership
- Judges sitting: John E. Jones III, U.S.D.J.

Whitewood v. Wolf is the federal lawsuit that successfully challenged the Pennsylvania Marriage Laws, (Note: 23 Pa. C.S. § 1102, as amended in 1996, defined marriage as a "civil contract by which one man and one woman take each other for husband and wife." Furthermore, 23 Pa. C.S. § 1704 was added and read: "It is hereby declared to be the strong and longstanding public policy of this Commonwealth that marriage shall be between one man and one woman. A marriage between persons of the same sex which was entered into in another state or foreign jurisdiction, even if valid where entered into, shall be void in this Commonwealth.") as amended in 1996 to ban same-sex marriage. The district court's decision in May 2014 held that the Marriage Laws violated the Due Process and Equal Protection clauses of the United States Constitution. Same-sex couples immediately sought and received marriage licenses and the decision was not appealed. One county clerk sought repeatedly without success to intervene to defend the law.

== Lawsuit ==
On July 9, 2013, following the U.S. Supreme Court decision in United States v. Windsor, the ACLU filed suit in U.S. District Court for the Middle District of Pennsylvania on behalf of 23 plaintiffs—10 couples, 2 of their children, and a widow—seeking to overturn Pennsylvania's 1996 statutory ban on same-sex marriage. The case, originally Whitewood v. Corbett, was assigned to Judge John E. Jones III. On July 11, Attorney General Kathleen Kane, a named defendant, said that she would not defend the statute as she "endorse[d] equality and anti-discrimination laws" and that the statute was "wholly unconstitutional". On July 30, Governor Tom Corbett announced he would defend the statute.

== Pretrial motions ==
All parties agreed to having Corbett's name removed as a defendant. The remaining named defendants are the state health and revenue secretaries, and the Bucks County register of wills. On November 15, Judge Jones rejected the state defendants' motion to dismiss the suit. The judge found that while Baker v. Nelson was precedent, it did not require him to find that denial of marriage equality is outside federal jurisdiction because "[t]he jurisprudence of equal protection and substantive due process has undergone what can only be characterized as a sea change since 1972", foremost being the recent Supreme Court ruling in United States v. Windsor. In early December, the state's attorneys asked Jones to allow them to ask the Third Circuit Court of Appeals to rule on whether Baker v. Nelson is binding precedent. Judge Jones denied this interlocutory appeal on December 17, writing "this Court is rightfully in position to consider and assess such doctrinal advancements [since Baker]."

On April 21, 2014, plaintiff same-sex couples filed a motion for summary judgment in Whitewood v. Wolf, which would allow the court to rule solely on the briefs without a trial. The state defendants agreed to dispense with trial as well.

== U.S. district court ruling ==
On May 20, 2014, Judge Jones ruled in Whitewood v. Wolf that Pennsylvania's same-sex marriage ban is unconstitutional. He applied intermediate scrutiny and declared that the ban violates the Due Process and Equal Protection clauses of the United States Constitution. The ruling was not stayed and same-sex couples in Pennsylvania could request and receive marriage licenses immediately and marry after a mandatory 3-day waiting period. Anticipating legal maneuvers to stay Jones' ruling, dozens of same-sex couples applied for marriage licenses the same day and some obtained waivers of the state's three-day waiting period. At least one couple managed to celebrate their wedding on May 21.

Pennsylvania's Republican governor Tom Corbett announced on May 21 that he would not appeal Judge Jones' decision, effectively making Pennsylvania the 19th state to recognize same-sex marriage.

== Proposed intervention ==
On June 6, the Schuylkill County court clerk responsible for responding to marriage license applications, Theresa Santai-Gaffney, filed a motion before Judge Jones to allow her to intervene in the case in her official capacity. She wanted the court to stay its decision in Whitewood v. Wolf and to allow her to appeal it. Judge Jones denied the motion on June 18, lamenting that a private citizen would use her public office to make a "wholly disingenuous" intervention.

Santai-Gaffney immediately appealed the denial of her intervention to the Third Circuit Court of Appeals and asked it to stay the lower court's ruling. She argued that the Supreme Court's order in Herbert v. Kitchen, 134 S.Ct. 893 (2014), is precedent for a stay, that she is likely to succeed on the merits, that sexual orientation is not a suspect class, and that the public interest is served by preventing same-sex marriage. The Third Circuit immediately ordered the case sent to a panel to determine if summary action was warranted.

=== Court of Appeals dismissal ===
On July 3, a three-judge panel of the Third Circuit summarily upheld Judge Jones' dismissal of Santai-Gaffney’s motion to intervene in the Whitewood case and ordered her appeal dismissed. In a brief, two-sentence order, U.S. Circuit Judge Patty Shwartz stated that the dismissal was appropriate “for essentially the reasons set forth in the Opinion of the District Court.” Following the decision, Santai-Gaffney’s attorney announced plans to seek further action, stating, “Our plan is to file something with the U.S. Supreme Court... The people of Pennsylvania deserve to have adequate review of this law.”

=== U.S. Supreme Court action ===
After the Third Circuit ruling, Santai-Gaffney applied for a stay of judgment from U.S. Supreme Court Associate Justice Samuel Alito, Circuit Justice for the Third Circuit, docketed sub nom. Santai-Gaffney v. Whitewood, No. 14A19 (July 7, 2014). In her application, the clerk attempted to overcome not only the questions of her interest in intervening and standing to appeal, but that she, as a public official, is suffering irreparable harm. Supreme Court rules also require it probable that four Justices grant certiorari on any question presented in order for a stay to be granted. The counsel of record in clerk Santai-Gaffney's litigation, as listed in court filings, is the Alliance Defending Freedom, a conservative Christian nonprofit organization. On July 9, Justice Alito denied the clerk's application for a stay, referencing National Organization for Marriage v. Geiger.

=== Petition for rehearing ===
On July 17, 2014, Santai-Gaffney filed a petition in the Third Circuit to rehear her motion to intervene, or to rehear it en banc. With no judge that concurred in denying the original motion asking for rehearing, and all active judges in the circuit voting against, on August 4, 2014, the petition for rehearing was denied.

== See also ==
- LGBT rights in Pennsylvania
- Same-sex marriage in Pennsylvania
