= Brownson House =

The Brownson House Inc.
- Founded: 1926; 100 years ago
- Type: Public charity (Note: The Brownson House and Vernon C. Neal Sportsplex are supported by three charities, including The Brownson House Inc., the Browson House Alumni Assoc Inc. and the Vernon C Neal & Alvina B Neal Fund)
- Tax ID no.: 25-0965444
- Location(s): 1415 Jefferson Avenue Washington, Pennsylvania
- Coordinates: 40°11′12.7″N 80°16′10.2″W
- Website: www.brownsonhouse.org

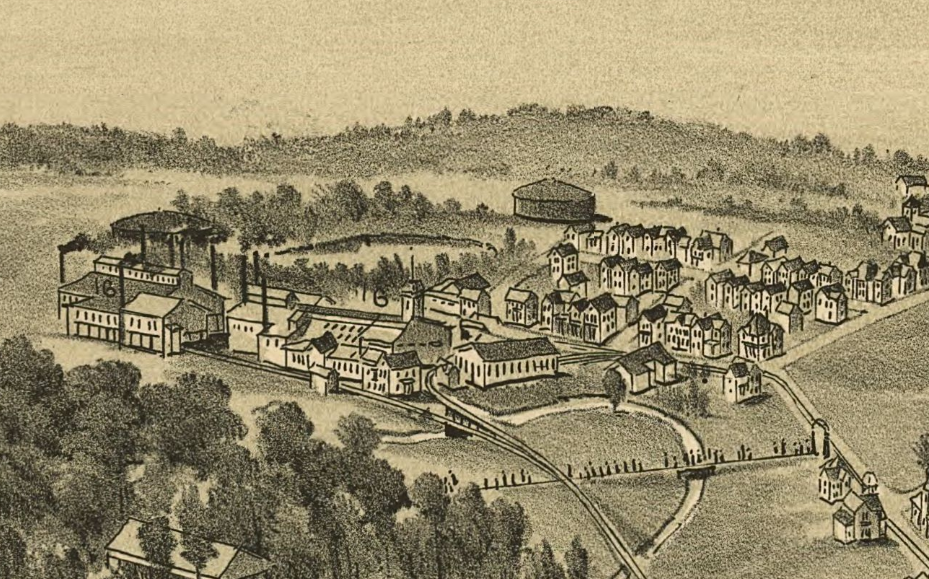
A map showing the Tyler Tube and Pipe Company, labeled "16". The facility would later become the Brownson House.

The Brownson House is a non-profit charitable organization in providing recreation, education, and character development services in Washington, Pennsylvania. The organization's primary facility provides athletic venues for flag football, basketball, boxing, cheerleading, dance classes, indoor soccer, inline hockey, lacrosse, and volleyball. It is affiliated with the local chapter of the United Way.

The origins of the Brownson House date to 1926 when Mrs. Paul Offill and 12 members of the Daughters of current Events Club began giving cooking and sewing classes. In 1928, a Boy's Club was added with the help of Washington & Jefferson College student volunteers. In 1934, the first permanent location was acquired on Weirich Avenue Settlement House; the organization merged with the local Community Chest and renamed the Neighborhood House Association. In 1937, the entity moved to the former Tyler Tube and Pipe Company building, where it currently resides. James I. Brownson, a Washington County judge purchased the building on behalf of the group. Upon his death, it was renamed The Brownson House in his honor.

In 1952, Art Sandusky was hired to be director, a position he held for 30 years. The Sandusky family, including Art's son Jerry Sandusky, lived in an apartment in the rec center. (Note: Following the publication of allegations against Jerry Sandusky relating to the Penn State child sex abuse scandal, many media outlets, including national media, visited the Brownson House to report on his hometown, explore how his formative years there related to his actions, and to gaugue the reactions of his former neighbors and friends.) The football field is now called "Art Sandusky Field."

It housed Kindergarten classes, to be followed by nursery classes when kindergarten was added by local schools. The T. S. Fitch Memorial Gymnasium, named for a prominent benefactor and volunteer, was built in 1962. In 2002, the organization was inducted into the Pennsylvania Sports Hall of Fame

The Brownson House joined with the City of Washington, Pennsylvania to build the Vernon C. Neal Sportsplex, part of Washington Park, in 2004.

Following the child sex abuse trial of Jerry Sandusky, journalist Marty Griffin from KDKA reported that several individuals had accused Sandusky of assaulting them during his time at the Brownson House.
