= Same-sex marriage in Pennsylvania =

Same-sex marriage has been legally recognized in Pennsylvania since May 20, 2014, when the U.S. District Court for the Middle District of Pennsylvania ruled that the state's statutory ban on same-sex marriage was unconstitutional in Whitewood v. Wolf. Governor Tom Corbett announced the following day that he would not appeal the decision. Pennsylvania was the eighteenth U.S. state and the last in the Northeastern United States to legalize same-sex marriage. Polling suggests that a large majority of Pennsylvania residents support the legal recognition of same-sex marriage, with a 2024 poll from the Public Religion Research Institute showing that 68% of residents supported same-sex marriage.

Pennsylvania had previously prohibited the recognition of same-sex marriage by statute since 1996, but had never added such a ban to its State Constitution. Efforts to legalize same-sex marriage in 2009 and 2013 were unsuccessful due to opposition from conservative members of the General Assembly. The state has also never recognized civil unions or domestic partnerships which would have provided couples with some of the rights and benefits of marriage.

== Legal history ==
=== Statutes ===
On May 8, 1996, Representative Allan Egolf introduced legislation to the Pennsylvania House of Representatives to ban same-sex marriages and prohibit the recognition of marriages performed in other states. The bill bypassed the House Judiciary Committee in the hopes of speeding its passage before the next election. On June 28, the House considered a bill to amend state statutes to allow for grandparents to adopt grandchildren over the objections of their parents. Egolf introduced an amendment to this bill that paralleled his anti-marriage bill. The Republican-controlled House voted to add this anti-marriage amendment to the adoption bill. The vote on the amendment was 177–16. An effort to rule it unconstitutional failed by a vote of 171 to 29. The bill, which had already passed the Senate, was sent back for a concurrence vote. After this vote, the House recessed for the summer. On October 1, the Republican-controlled Senate voted 43–5 to approve the anti-marriage language added by the House. Governor Tom Ridge signed the act into law on October 8. The same year, the United States Congress also passed the Defense of Marriage Act (DOMA; Pennsylvania Dutch: Ksetz zum Schutz vun der Ehe), which banned federal recognition of same-sex marriages.

Several attempts to recognize same-sex marriages failed in the General Assembly while the Republican Party had majorities in either the Senate or the House of Representatives. Legislation to extend marriage rights to same-sex couples by amending state statutes has been introduced to the General Assembly several times. In May 2009, Senator Daylin Leach introduced such a bill to the Senate. Representative Babette Josephs also introduced a similar bill to the House of Representatives. Both bills remained in committee, and died at the end of the legislative session. In March 2013, Senator Leach introduced another bill, and in June 2013 representatives Brian Sims and Steve McCarter introduced a same-sex marriage bill to the House, following the U.S. Supreme Court's ruling in United States v. Windsor. Both bills died at the end of the legislative session.

Representative Malcolm Kenyatta introduced a bill to repeal the statutory ban in 2021, but it failed to pass before the General Assembly adjourned sine die. A similar bill was introduced in 2023 by representatives Kenyatta, Danilo Burgos, Jessica Benham, and Jamie Flick. A new bill was introduced in May 2024 with 39 sponsors. It passed the House on July 2, 2024 by a vote of 133–68, but was not brought to a vote in the Republican-controlled Senate. The bill was reintroduced in August 2025. In March 2026, the bill was passed on the House by a vote of 127-72. It was passed with bipartisan support with all Democrats except Frank Burns supporting the bill along with 26 Republicans.

=== Attempts to pass constitutional ban ===
In Pennsylvania, a constitutional amendment requires approval by both chambers of the General Assembly in two successive two-year sessions before going to voters in a referendum. In 2006, five state representatives, with Representative Scott W. Boyd as a main sponsor, introduced House Bill 2381, proposing an amendment to the Constitution of Pennsylvania defining marriage as "the union of one man and one woman". The bill had 87 cosponsors and was approved on June 6, 2006 on a vote of 136–61. The Senate approved the bill 38–12 on June 21, 2006. It was referred to the Rules Committee in the House of Representatives on June 22, 2006, where no action was taken. In 2008, a similar bill with Senator Mike Brubaker as its main sponsor, Senate Bill 1250, was approved by the Senate Judiciary Committee. It would have banned same-sex marriage and its "functional equivalent". This language led to debate on whether the bill would not only ban same-sex marriage and civil unions, but also prevent hospital visitation, employer health care benefits and recognition of a will for same-sex couples. The bill was laid on the table on May 6, 2008 because the House of Representatives would not allow it to be considered by the State Government Committee in a timely manner. Senator Brubaker requested the bill be laid aside. The Senate agreed to the motion by a voice vote.

In 2010, Senator John Eichelberger introduced new legislation, Senate Bill 707, to ban same-sex marriages in the State Constitution. This proposed amendment failed in the Judiciary Committee, when all 5 Democrats and 3 Republicans voted to table the amendment against the opposition of 6 Republicans. On May 3, 2011, Representative Daryl Metcalfe introduced House Bill 1434 with 36 cosponsors. It was referred to the State Government Committee. The bill would have constitutionally banned same-sex marriage and any "substantial equivalent". On March 13, 2012, opponents of the bill claimed victory when Metcalfe delayed a committee vote on the legislation. Metcalfe reintroduced the bill with 27 cosponsors on May 7, 2013, the lowest number of cosponsors the bill had had when introduced. The measure was unsuccessful and died at the end of the legislative session.

=== Federal lawsuits ===
==== Whitewood v. Wolf ====
On July 9, 2013, following the U.S. Supreme Court's decision in United States v. Windsor, the American Civil Liberties Union (ACLU) filed a lawsuit in the U.S. District Court for the Middle District of Pennsylvania on behalf of 23 plaintiffs—10 couples, 2 of their children, and a widow—seeking to overturn Pennsylvania's 1996 statutory ban on same-sex marriage. Attorney General Kathleen Kane, a named defendant, said that she would not defend the statute, but Governor Tom Corbett announced he would. On May 20, 2014, Judge John E. Jones III ruled that Pennsylvania's same-sex marriage ban violated the Constitution of the United States. The ruling was not stayed, and same-sex couples in Pennsylvania began receiving marriage licenses immediately and marrying after a mandatory 3-day waiting period. Anticipating legal maneuvers to stay Jones' ruling, dozens of same-sex couples applied for marriage licenses the same day and some obtained waivers of the state's three-day waiting period. The first couple to marry, Jess Garrity and Pamela VanHaitsma, did so on May 21 in Pittsburgh. Governor Corbett announced on May 21 that he would not appeal Judge Jones' decision, effectively making Pennsylvania the eighteenth U.S. state to recognize same-sex marriage. In a quoted passage from the Whitewood ruling, Jones wrote:

[T]his Court is not only moved by the logic that the fundamental right to marry is a personal right to be exercised by the individual, but also rejects Defendants' contention that concepts of history and tradition dictate that same-sex marriage is excluded from the fundamental right to marry. The right Plaintiffs seek to exercise is not a new right, but is rather a right that these individuals have always been guaranteed by the United States Constitution. [...] Defendants have failed to carry their burden [to prove that their purported justifications for the law are 'important'], and we conclude that the classification imposed by the Marriage Laws based on sexual orientation is not substantially related to an important governmental interest. [...] Based on the foregoing, we hold that Pennsylvania's Marriage Laws violate both the Due Process and Equal Protection Clauses of the Fourteenth Amendment to the United States Constitution. Because these laws are unconstitutional, we shall enter an order permanently enjoining their enforcement. By virtue of this ruling, same-sex couples who seek to marry in Pennsylvania may do so, and already married same-sex couples will be recognized as such in the Commonwealth.

The Schuylkill County Clerk of Orphans' Court, Theresa Santai-Gaffney, responsible for responding to marriage license applications, repeatedly sought to intervene to defend the statute without success. She was rebuffed by Judge Jones, the Third Circuit Court of Appeals, U.S. Supreme Court Associate Justice Samuel Alito, and again by the Third Circuit. The president of the Pennsylvania Family Institute decried the court ruling, "What Judge Jones has done is extralegal, going beyond what the law or the constitution requires and the fact that he is allowing, or apparently allowing, same-sex marriage licenses to be distributed immediately undermines the Democratic process." The ACLU issued the following statement, "Another wonderful day for liberty and justice for all in Pennsylvania." Attorney General Kane said, "Our commonwealth progressed today and so have the hopes and dreams of many who suffer from inequality. Today, in Pennsylvania, the constitution prevailed." Senator Bob Casey Jr. also welcomed the court decision, "This was the right decision and is a step forward for equality in our commonwealth and in the nation."

==== Palladino v. Corbett ====
On September 26, 2013, a same-sex couple lawfully married in Massachusetts filed suit in the U.S. District Court for the Eastern District of Pennsylvania, seeking to require that Pennsylvania recognize out-of-state same-sex marriages. The couple also sought a declaration that the statute outlawing in-state same-sex marriage be declared unconstitutional. The case was assigned to U.S. District Judge Mary A. McLaughlin. The defendants, Governor Corbett and Attorney General Kane, filed motions to dismiss that November and December, respectively, with the plaintiffs responding in January 2014. The case was styled Palladino v. Corbett after first-named defendant Governor Corbett. On January 17, 2014, a group called the Philadelphia Metro Task Force, opposed to same-sex marriage recognition in Pennsylvania, sought to intervene in the lawsuit. This group alleged that, in allowing same-sex marriage, "reverse discrimination is threatened amidst a continual omission of religious and moral freedom." Judge McLaughlin denied the group's motion to intervene on March 4, 2014, because they "do not identify a sufficient interest they might have at stake in this litigation, nor do they demonstrate why their interests are not adequately represented by an existing party." She also denied the group amicus curiae status, meaning they could not file a brief as a non-party to the case.

Oral arguments for summary judgment in the case were held on May 15. The case was rendered moot on May 21 when Governor Corbett decided not to appeal the decision in Whitewood v. Wolf, and as a result, same-sex marriage commenced throughout Pennsylvania. On both May 22 and 28, Judge Mary McLaughlin ordered the plaintiff couples to show cause why their case should not be dismissed because of mootness. Judge McLaughlin issued an order on September 8 suspending further proceedings until "expiration of the deadline to petition the U.S. Supreme Court for a writ of certiorari in Whitewood." After the Whitewood decision allowed the Palladino plaintiffs to lawfully marry in Pennsylvania, and the state defendants stipulated "that they will take no steps to deprive Plaintiffs of the benefits accorded by the validity and recognition of their marriage under Pennsylvania law", Judge McLaughlin ordered the case voluntarily dismissed as moot on October 22, 2014.

=== State lawsuits ===
==== DeSanto v. Barnsley ====
In 1981, John DeSanto sued his former partner William Barnsley, claiming in DeSanto v. Barnsley that since Pennsylvania recognized common-law marriages, their long-term relationship should be recognized as such. In May 1984, the Superior Court of Pennsylvania ruled against him and dismissed the case, stating that the issue of recognition of same-sex unions was a matter for the General Assembly to address.

==== Commonwealth v. Hanes, Cucinotta v. Commonwealth, and Ballen v. Wolf ====
In July 2013, shortly after Attorney General Kathleen Kane declined to defend Pennsylvania's prohibition of same-sex marriage in U.S. district court, D. Bruce Hanes, the Montgomery County Register of Wills and Clerk of Orphans' Court, announced he would issue marriage licenses to same-sex couples. He interpreted his Orphans' Court's position as a judicial one and found that denying same-sex couples marriage licenses as the statutes required would violate their rights under the State Constitution. Between July 24 and August 9, 2013, he issued marriage licenses to more than 100 same-sex couples. A week later, the Pennsylvania Department of Health filed a lawsuit with the Commonwealth Court to enjoin Hanes from issuing any more such licenses. The lead state court case was Commonwealth v. Hanes. Oral arguments were held on September 4, 2013. On September 12, 2013, Judge Dan Pellegrini ordered Hanes to stop issuing marriage licenses to same-sex couples "[u]nless and until either the General Assembly repeals or suspends the Marriage Law provisions or a court of competent jurisdiction orders that the law is not to be obeyed or enforced". Hanes had issued 174 licenses to same-sex couples before the court issued its order. He appealed the decision to the Supreme Court of Pennsylvania. Couples who received a marriage license from Hanes filed an amicus curiae brief on his behalf on December 2, 2013. In the brief, the couples noted that the court never ruled on the substantive issue of same-sex marriage.

On September 6, 2013, in Cucinotta v. Commonwealth, a same-sex couple in Chester County filed a petition asking the Commonwealth Court to find Pennsylvania's restrictions on same-sex marriage unconstitutional. On September 25, 2013, a group of 42 individuals who were married with licenses issued by Hanes petitioned the Commonwealth Court in Ballen v. Corbett, later restyled Ballen v. Wolf, to overturn the state's same-sex marriage ban on the grounds that it violated both the state and federal constitutions.

The cases pending in the Commonwealth Court were rendered moot on May 21 when Governor Corbett decided not to appeal the decision in Whitewood, which left in place the order ending enforcement of Pennsylvania's denial of marriage rights to same-sex couples. On September 30, Judge Dan Pellegrini approved an agreement between the parties in Ballen and ordered the case dismissed. The agreement provided that the Ballen petitioners and similarly-situated intervening parties were married under state law as of the May 20 order in Whitewood, even though the petitioners had received marriage licenses from Hanes and/or solemnized their marriages before that date.

== Economic impact ==
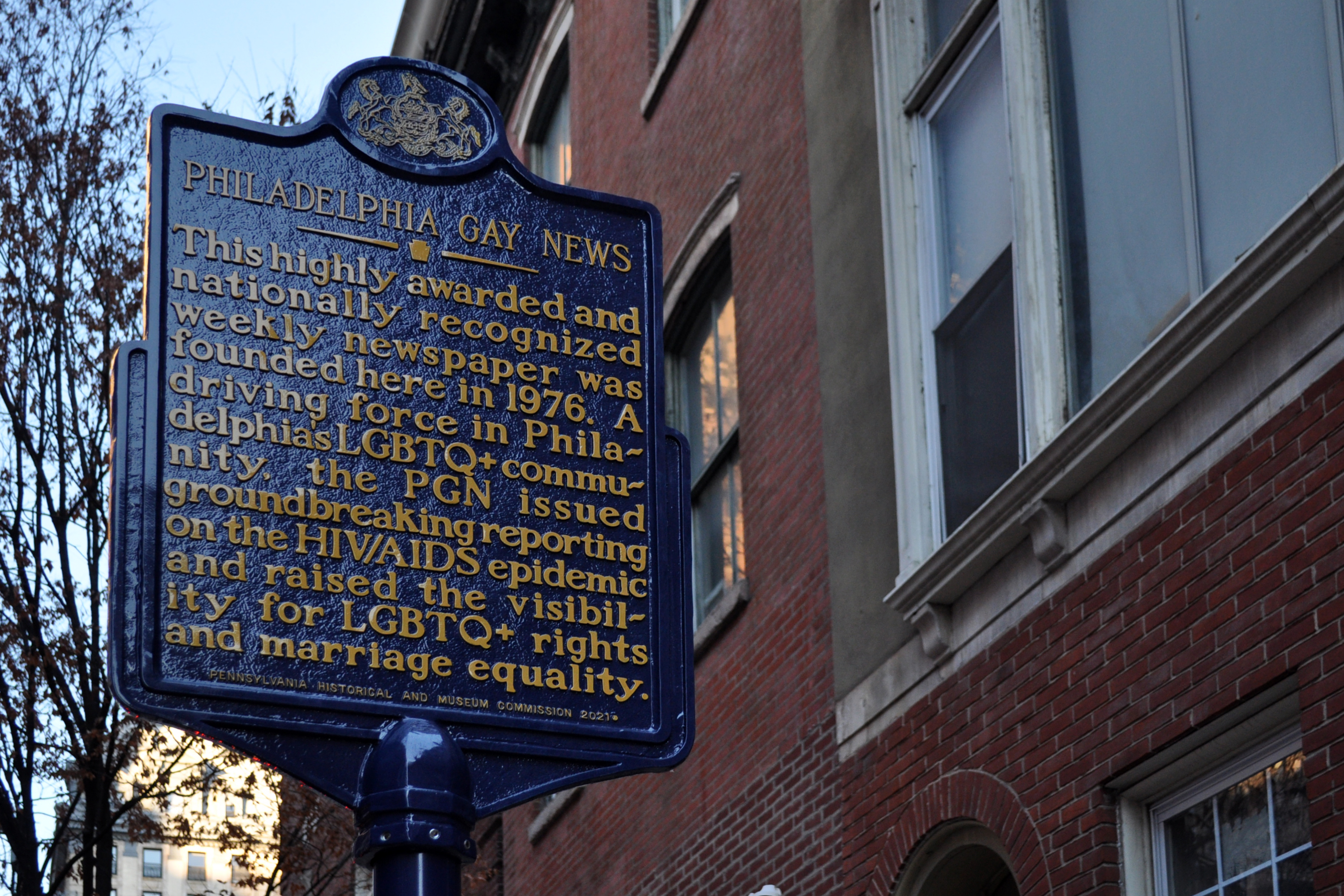
Historical marker in Philadelphia commemorating the reporting of the Philadelphia Gay News on the HIV/AIDS epidemic and raising visibility for LGBT rights and same-sex marriage

A study from the University of California, Los Angeles (UCLA) found that allowing same-sex couples to marry in Pennsylvania would add nearly $100 million to the state's economy. Total spending related to weddings and wedding-related tourism would account for up to $92 million in the first three years, and state and local tax revenues were expected to increase by up to $5 million. Additionally, up to 1,142 new full-time and part-time jobs were expected to be created by the additional economic activity.

== Demographics and marriage statistics ==
The Pennsylvania Department of Health records the number of marriages performed each year, but does not distinguish between different-sex and same-sex marriages in its data. A 2016 study by the United States Department of the Treasury showed that Philadelphia, Harrisburg, Pittsburgh, Lancaster and Allentown were the cities with the highest proportion of same-sex marriages.

2017 estimates from the United States Census Bureau showed that there were about 32,700 same-sex households in Pennsylvania. This represented an increase compared to 2016 (about 32,400 households), 2015 (about 31,400 households) and 2014 (about 28,700 households). The bureau estimated that 58.6% of same-sex couples living in the state in 2017 were married. The 2020 U.S. census showed that there were 21,782 married same-sex couple households (9,837 male couples and 11,945 female couples) and 18,508 unmarried same-sex couple households in Pennsylvania.

== Public opinion ==
Public opinion for same-sex marriage in Pennsylvania
Poll source	Dates administered	Sample size	Margin of error	Support	Opposition	Do not know / refused
Public Religion Research Institute	March 13 – December 2, 2024	996 adults	?	68%	28%	4%
Public Religion Research Institute	March 9 – December 7, 2023	956 adults	?	66%	31%	3%
Public Religion Research Institute	March 11 – December 14, 2022	?	?	68%	29%	3%
Public Religion Research Institute	March 8 – November 9, 2021	?	?	69%	28%	3%
Public Religion Research Institute	January 7 – December 20, 2020	2,053 adults	?	69%	24%	7%
Public Religion Research Institute	April 5 – December 23, 2017	3,278 adults	?	64%	27%	9%
Public Religion Research Institute	May 18, 2016 – January 10, 2017	4,610 adults	?	60%	32%	8%
Public Religion Research Institute	April 29, 2015 – January 7, 2016	3,753 adults	?	55%	36%	9%
Public Religion Research Institute	April 2, 2014 – January 4, 2015	2,515 adults	?	56%	37%	7%
The Morning Call/Muhlenberg College	November 19 – December 10, 2014	503 adults	± 6.0%	62%	32%	6%
Public Policy Polling	May 30 – June 1, 2014	835 registered voters	± 3.4%	48%	44%	8%
Quinnipiac University	February 19–24, 2014	1,405 registered voters	± 2.6%	57%	37%	6%
Public Religion Research Institute	November 12 – December 18, 2013	277 adults	± 7.6%	61%	35%	4%
Franklin & Marshall College	April 30 – May 5, 2013	526 voters	± 4.3%	54%	41%	5%
Public Policy Polling	March 8–10, 2013	504 voters	± 4.4%	45%	47%	8%
Franklin & Marshall College	January 29 – February 3, 2013	622 registered voters	± 3.9%	52%	41%	7%
Quinnipiac University	January 22–27, 2013	1,221 registered voters	± 2.8%	47%	42%	11%
The Morning Call/Muhlenberg College	September 22–26, 2012	427 likely voters	± 5.0%	44%	45%	11%
Franklin & Marshall College	May 29 – June 4, 2012	412 voters	± 4.8%	48%	49%	3%
Public Policy Polling	May 17–20, 2012	671 voters	± 3.8%	39%	48%	13%
Public Policy Polling	November 17–20, 2011	500 voters	± 4.4%	36%	52%	12%
Franklin & Marshall College	August 22–29, 2011	525 adults	± 4.3%	50%	42%	8%
Public Policy Polling	June 30 – July 5, 2011	545 voters	± 4.2%	38%	51%	11%

Various polls have been commissioned by participants in the same-sex marriage debate. The poll results reflect different question wording and sampling. An April 2011 Public Policy Polling (PPP) survey found that when Pennsylvania voters were asked to choose between same-sex marriage, civil unions, or no legal recognition of same-sex relationships, 30% supported same-sex marriage, 33% supported civil unions and 35% opposed all legal recognition, while 2% were undecided. In July 2011, in a separate question offering voters the option of civil unions, 32% of respondents supported same-sex marriage, 36% supported civil unions and 31% opposed all legal recognition, while 1% were unsure. In November 2011, the PPP showed that 29% of voters supported same-sex marriage, 35% supported civil unions and 33% opposed all legal recognition, while 3% were not sure. In May 2012, the same polling organization showed that 35% of voters supported same-sex marriage, 33% supported civil unions and 28% opposed all legal recognition, while 4% were unsure.

The August 2011 Franklin & Marshall College survey found that 50% of Pennsylvania respondents supported a constitutional amendment to legalize same-sex marriage, while 42% opposed it and 8% were not sure. A separate question on the same survey found that 62% of respondents supported a law legalizing civil unions for same-sex couples, while 34% opposed it and 4% were not sure. The June 2012 Franklin & Marshall College survey found that 48% of Pennsylvania respondents supported a constitutional amendment to legalize same-sex marriage, while 49% were against such an amendment, an increase of 6% in support since 2009. A separate question on the same survey found that 63% of respondents favored a law legalizing civil unions for same-sex couples, while 33% were against such a law, an increase in support of 5% since 2009.

The January 2013 Quinnipiac University poll showed that 47% supported same-sex marriage, while 43% were opposed to the idea. The poll also found that white Catholics supported same-sex marriage by a 50–40 margin, while white Protestants opposed same-sex marriage by a 60–31 margin. The March 2013 PPP survey found that 45% of Pennsylvania voters supported same-sex marriages, while 47% were opposed. Asked on the question of marriage or civil unions, over 74% of respondents indicated support for either—with 38% supporting marriage rights and 36% supporting civil unions but not marriage. 24% of respondents were opposed to any civil recognition for same-sex couples, while 2% of respondents were undecided.

== See also ==
- LGBT rights in Pennsylvania
- Same-sex marriage in the United States
