= The Second Mile =

Defunct American nonprofit organization

- Founded: 1977
- Founder: Jerry Sandusky
- Dissolved: 2016
- Type: Youth organization charity
- Location: Pennsylvania
- Website: thesecondmile.org

The Second Mile was a nonprofit organization for underprivileged youth, providing help for at-risk children and support for their parents in Pennsylvania. It was founded in 1977 by Jerry Sandusky, a then-Penn State assistant college football coach. The charity said its youth programs served as many as 100,000 children annually. The organization ceased operations after Sandusky was found guilty of child sex abuse.

== Early work and praise ==
The Second Mile grew, serving about 20,000 kids in 1989 to more than 300,000 in 2010. U.S. President George H. W. Bush praised the group as a "shining example" of charity work in a 1990 letter, one of that president's much-promoted "Thousand points of light" encouragements to volunteer community organizations. Citing Sandusky's work with The Second Mile charity to provide care for foster children, then U.S. Senator Rick Santorum honored Sandusky with an Angels in Adoption award in 2002. As of November 4, 2011, when charges were filed against Sandusky, Eagles former head coach Dick Vermeil and then-head coach Andy Reid, former Phillies owner R.R.M. Carpenter, III, Matt Millen from ESPN, actor Mark Wahlberg, golfer Arnold Palmer, and football players Jack Ham and Franco Harris, among others, were shown on the charity’s website as serving on its Honorary Board. Questions were soon raised about how closely if at all the listed members were involved. Wahlberg stated that he had made some donations but was unaware of being listed as an honorary board member, and Cal Ripken Jr. was reported to have been only marginally involved with the charity and asked for his name to be removed; the entire list was removed from the organization's website a few days later.

== Revenue and major donors ==
The Second Mile had three offices in Pennsylvania, with headquarters in the municipality of State College, Pennsylvania. The charity's revenue, primarily from donations and fundraisers such as golf tournaments, was $3 million in 2009. Major companies and foundations that have given to The Second Mile include Bank of America, BNY Mellon, the Hershey Company, Merck, State Farm, Sheetz, U.S. Steel Corp., PepsiCo, Frito-Lay, local Walmarts and newspapers. The charity’s president for 28 years, Jack Raykovitz (who resigned when Sandusky was charged), had earned $133,000 in 2009, while his wife and longtime Second Mile executive vice-president, Katherine Genovese, received $100,000 for her duties that same year.

== Scandal and closure ==
The Second Mile's Founder, Jerry Sandusky, was arrested on charges of child sexual abuse in November 2011. In June 2012, he was found guilty on 45 of the 48 counts against him. Sandusky met all of the victims through The Second Mile. After the initial charges, Angels in Adoption rescinded its earlier 2002 award to Sandusky for his work with The Second Mile "in light of the serious allegations against him, and to preserve the integrity of the Angels in Adoption program."

Jack Raykovitz, the longtime president and CEO of The Second Mile, announced his resignation on November 14. Under new management, the charity told The New York Times on November 18, 2011 that it was preparing to fold, with plans to transfer some programs to other charities. An attorney for one of Sandusky's victims filed suit to prevent the transfer of assets, and the charity soon thereafter made an announcement asking potential donors to instead give to the Pennsylvania Coalition Against Rape; programs were expected to continue at least through the end of the year. On May 25, 2012, interim CEO David Woodle announced the organization had requested court approval to transfer its programs and remaining assets to Arrow Child & Family Ministries, after which The Second Mile would cease operations. In 2016, a judge ruled in favor of allowing the charity to dissolve.
