= Jon Sandusky =

American sports executive (born 1977)

New Orleans Saints
- Title: Area scout

Personal information
- Born: February 21, 1977 (age 49); State College, Pennsylvania, U.S.

Career information
- High school: State College (PA)
- College: Penn State

Career history
- Penn State (2000–2001) Coaching intern; Philadelphia Eagles (2002–2008) Pro scout; Philadelphia Eagles (2008–2009) Director of pro personnel; Cleveland Browns (2010–2014) Director of player personnel; Cleveland Browns (2014−2015) Player personnel associate; New Orleans Saints (2015−present) Scout

Jon D. Sandusky (born February 21, 1977) is a National Football League (NFL) scout for the New Orleans Saints. He was the director of pro personnel for the Philadelphia Eagles from 2008 to 2009, and the director of player personnel for the Cleveland Browns from 2010 to 2014.

== Coaching career ==
Sandusky served as an intern for the Penn State football team for two years.

== Executive career ==
=== Philadelphia Eagles ===
Sandusky joined the Philadelphia Eagles in 2001 as an intern in the personnel department. He became a pro scout the following year, and served in that capacity from 2002 to 2008, before being promoted to director of pro personnel on June 10, 2008.

=== Cleveland Browns ===
Sandusky was hired by the Cleveland Browns as the director of player personnel on January 20, 2010, after former Eagles general manager Tom Heckert was hired in Cleveland. He was demoted to player personnel associate in 2014, and the Browns "parted ways" with him on May 18, 2015.

=== New Orleans Saints ===
In 2015, the New Orleans Saints hired Sandusky as an area scout.

== Personal ==
Sandusky was arrested in October 2013 for driving under the influence.

He is the adopted son of convicted serial child rapist and former Penn State assistant football coach Jerry Sandusky.
