= Deviant sexual intercourse =

American legal term

Deviant sexual intercourse or deviate sexual intercourse is, in some U.S. states, a legal term for "any act of sexual gratification involving the sex organs of one person and the mouth or anus of another, anus to mouth or involving invasion of the anus or vagina of one person by a foreign object manipulated by another person".

== Model Penal Code ==
In the United States of America, deviate sexual intercourse has been popularized since its usage in the U.S. Model Penal Code. The MPC defines,

"Deviate sexual intercourse" means sexual intercourse per os or per anum between human beings who are not husband and wife, and any form of sexual intercourse with an animal."

== U.S. states ==
Typically, the act itself (whether consensual or not) used to be a crime, but the term is now used to describe forcible or otherwise involuntary acts that differ from the crime of rape (sometimes deviant sexual intercourse is included in the definition of rape), in the way that indecent assault might be used in other states and countries.

=== Texas & Kentucky ===
In the United States, the term has replaced sodomy in the criminal codes of some states, including Texas and Kentucky.

=== Pennsylvania ===
As an example, Section 3101 of the Pennsylvania Consolidated Statutes defines "deviate sexual intercourse" as "Sexual intercourse per os or per anus between human beings and any form of sexual intercourse with an animal. The term also includes penetration, however slight, of the genitals or anus of another person with a foreign object for any purpose other than good faith medical, hygienic or law enforcement procedures." On March 31, 1995, "Section 3124. Voluntary deviate sexual intercourse" was repealed; it was no longer considered a criminal offense to engage in such activity voluntarily.

== SCOTUS ==
The consensual practice of anal or oral sex was legalised by the 2003 U.S. Supreme Court case of Lawrence v. Texas.
