= Investigations into the Rotherham child sexual exploitation scandal =

Investigations into sexual exploitation scandal in England

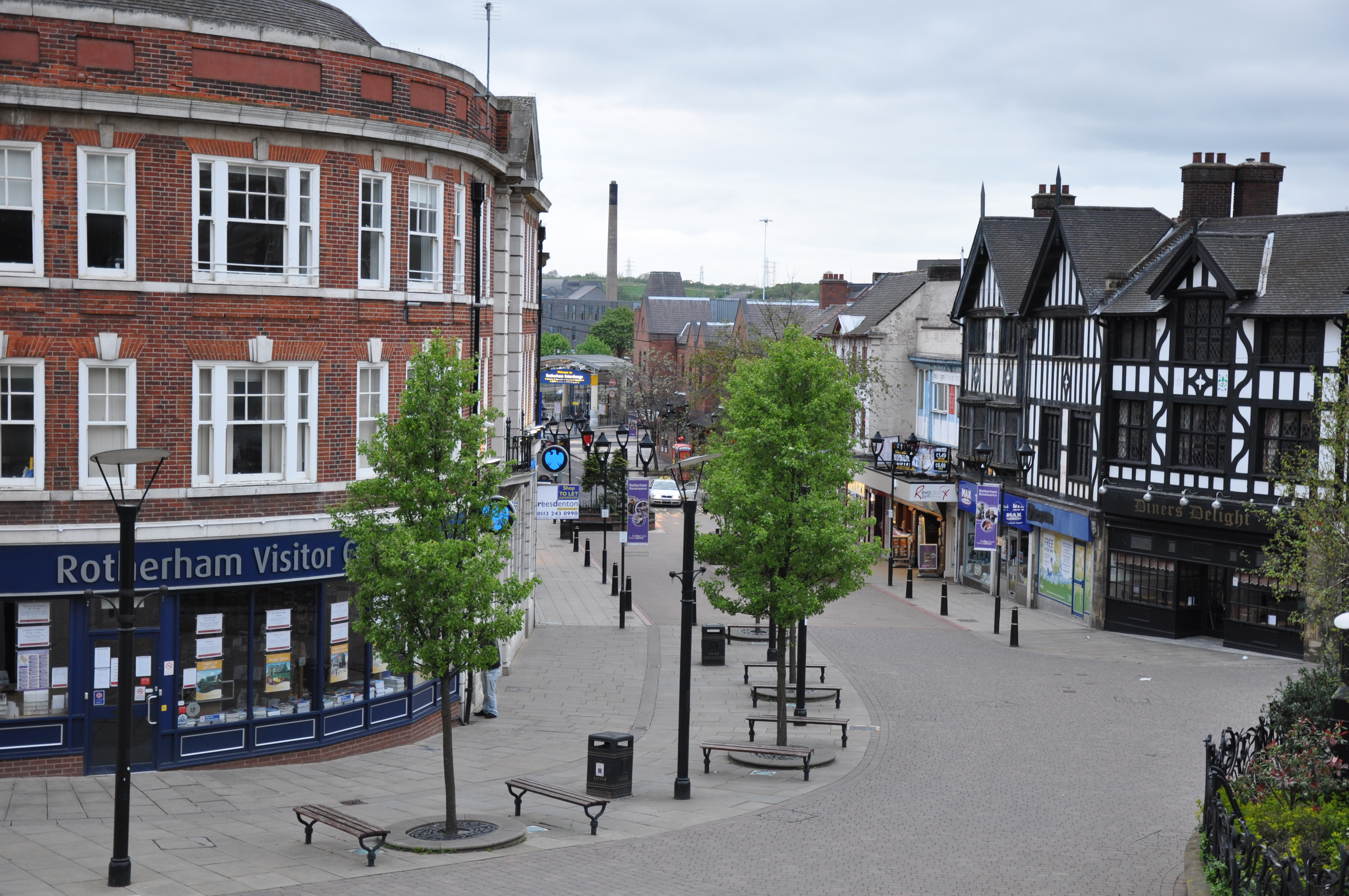
- Rotherham town centre, March 2010
- Date: 1970s–present
- Location: Rotherham, South Yorkshire, England; 53.430°N 1.357°W
- Reporter: Andrew Norfolk of The Times, with information from Jayne Senior, youth worker
- Inquiries: Home Affairs Committee (2013–2014); Jay inquiry (2014); Casey inquiry (2015)
- Convictions: c. 60 (rising) Operation Central: 5 men Operation Clover: 18 men & 2 women Operation Stovewood: 39 men (trials ongoing as of February 2025) (Note: Operation Stovewood says 39. The Star says 40.)
- Awards: Andrew Norfolk: Orwell Prize (2013), Journalist of the Year (2014); Jayne Senior: MBE (2016 Birthday Honours)
- Events: Child sexual abuse of an estimated 1,400 (1970s–2013, according various reports including Jayne Senior) majority aged approximately 11–16.
- Trials: Sheffield Crown Court, 2010, 2016–2017, convictions for rape, conspiracy to rape, aiding and abetting rape, sexual intercourse with a girl under 13, indecent assault, false imprisonment, procurement. Numerous individual prosecutions regarding child sexual exploitation over the years, including 8 in 2012, 9 in 2013, and 1 in the first quarter of 2014

Investigations into the Rotherham child sexual exploitation scandal included local, national and media reviews, inquiries and investigations into the organised child sexual abuse of girls that occurred in the town of Rotherham, South Yorkshire, Northern England, from the late 1980s until 2013, and particularly the failures of local authorities to act on reports of the abuse throughout most of that period.

Evidence of the abuse was first noted in the early 1990s, with reports made to the police and Rotherham Council from at least 2001. The first group conviction took place in 2010. Subsequently, Andrew Norfolk of The Times reported that the abuse in the town was widespread and that the police and council had known about it for over ten years. (Note: Andrew Norfolk began investigating in 2010. The first of his articles appeared over four pages in The Times in January 2011, accompanied by an editorial. Andrew Norfolk (The Times, 24 September 2012): "Confidential police reports and intelligence files ... show that for more than a decade organised groups of men were able to groom, pimp and traffic girls across the country with virtual impunity. Offenders were identified to police but not prosecuted.") The Times articles, along with the 2012 trial of the Rochdale child sex abuse ring, prompted the House of Commons Home Affairs Committee to conduct hearings.

In 2013, Rotherham Council commissioned an independent inquiry led by Professor Alexis Jay, former chief social work adviser to the Scottish Government. In August 2014, the Jay Report published its recommendations and concluded that an estimated 1,400 children had been sexually abused in Rotherham between 1997 and 2013. The perpetrators were predominantly British-Pakistani men. The majority of victims were White British girls, but British Asian girls in Rotherham were also targeted and received less support or public attention. The failure to address the abuse was attributed to a combination of factors, including fear that the perpetrators' ethnicity would trigger allegations of racism; sexist and classist attitudes toward the mostly working-class victims; lack of a child-centred focus; a desire to protect the town's reputation; and lack of training and resources. Several local authority and police staff members resigned after the report was published. The Independent Police Complaints Commission and the National Crime Agency also opened inquiries in response to the report, with the latter expected to last eight years.

In 2014, the government appointed Louise Casey to conduct an inspection of Rotherham Council, published in January 2015. The Casey report concluded that the council was "not fit for purpose" and had a culture of bullying, sexism, covering up information and silencing whistleblowers. In February 2015 the government replaced the council's elected officers with a team of five commissioners.

== Background ==
Metropolitan Borough of Rotherham within South Yorkshire and England

The Rotherham child sexual exploitation scandal refers to the organised child sexual abuse that occurred in the town of Rotherham, South Yorkshire, Northern England, from the late 1980s until 2013. An estimated 1,400 girls, commonly from care home backgrounds, were abused by "grooming gangs" of predominantly British-Pakistani men between 1997 and 2013. Researcher Angie Heal, who was hired by local officials and warned them about child exploitation occurring between 2002 and 2007, has since described it as the "biggest child protection scandal in UK history".

Rotherham has traditionally been a Labour stronghold, and until Sarah Champion was elected in 2012 it had never had a female MP. The council was similarly male-dominated; one Labour insider told The Guardian in 2012: "The Rotherham political class is male, male, male." In May 2014 there were 63 elected members on Rotherham Metropolitan Borough Council: 57 Labour, four Conservatives, one UKIP and one Independent. The elections in August that year saw a swing to UKIP: 49 Labour, 10 UKIP, 2 Conservatives and 2 Independents. The government disbanded the council in 2015, after the Casey report, and replaced it with a team of five commissioners.

=== Terminology ===
The term child sexual exploitation (CSE) was first used in 2009 to replace the term child prostitution, which implied a level of consent. CSE is a form of child sexual abuse in which children are offered something—money, drugs, alcohol, food, shelter, or affection—in exchange for sexual activity. Violence and intimidation are common. CSE includes online grooming and localised grooming, formerly known as on-street grooming. Localised grooming involves a group of abusers targeting vulnerable children in a public place, offering them sweets, alcohol, drugs and takeaway food in exchange for sex. The targets can include children in the care of the local authority; in Rotherham, one third of the targeted children were previously known to social services. Perpetrators of group-based CSE are often informally known as "grooming gangs" (a term which has been described by academics and child protection professionals as racially charged).

== The Times investigation ==
=== Background ===
Andrew Norfolk of The Times first wrote about localised grooming in 2003, after moving from London to Leeds, when he wrote a brief story about the Keighley child sex abuse ring. Ann Cryer, MP for Keighley, had complained that "Asian men" were targeting teenage girls outside schools, while parents alleged that police and social services were declining to act. From then until 2010, Norfolk heard of court cases in northern England and the Midlands reporting a similar pattern. Court records showed 17 cases of localised grooming in 13 northern towns since 1997—14 since 2008—in which 56 men were convicted of sexual offences against girls aged 11–16. Norfolk interviewed two of the affected families, and in January 2011 the first of a series of stories appeared over four pages in The Times, accompanied by an editorial, "Revealed: conspiracy of silence on UK sex gangs". Norfolk told the Home Affairs Committee in 2013 that council staff and senior police officers called him to thank him; one director of children's services told him: "My staff are jumping for joy in the office today because finally somebody has said what we have not felt able to say."

=== Murder of Laura Wilson ===
In 2012, Rotherham Council applied to the High Court for an injunction to stop Norfolk publishing an unredacted version of a serious case review written after the murder of a local girl, Laura Wilson. Known in the review as "Child S", Wilson was 17 in October 2010 when she was stabbed 40 times and thrown in the canal by her 17-year-old ex-boyfriend, Ashtiaq Asghar, an act the police called an "honour killing". (Note: Jayne Senior (2016) wrote that one police officer told her: "We've been told we have to take this down the honour-killing route. We can't mention anything to do with CSE [child sexual exploitation] in this investigation.") She had had a baby four months earlier by a 21-year-old married man. The families of the men, both Pakistani heritage, had apparently been unaware of the relationships and the existence of the child. Tired of being a secret, Wilson decided to tell them. Days later, the ex-boyfriend murdered her. Both men stood trial; the older man was acquitted, and Asghar was jailed for 17 years and six months.

Assessed as having an IQ of 56 and a reading and spelling age of 6, Wilson had been the target of localised grooming from at least age 11. The council had referred her to Risky Business three months after her 11th birthday, and when she was 13, Wilson and her family had appeared on The Jeremy Kyle Show to discuss children who were out of control. She had also been mentioned in the 2009 criminal inquiry that led to the first five convictions arising out of localised grooming in Rotherham.

The government ordered that the council publish its serious case review. It was published with passages blacked out on 61 of its 144 pages. Norfolk obtained an unredacted version, and found that the council had hidden the men's ethnicity, as well as Wilson's mention during the 2009 criminal inquiry, and the extent of the council's involvement in her care. Michael Gove, then education secretary, accused the council in June 2012 of withholding "relevant and important material". After Gove's intervention, the council withdrew its legal action, and Norfolk published the story under the headline "Officials hid vital facts about men suspected of grooming girl for sex".

=== September 2012 ===
On 24 September 2012, Norfolk wrote that the abuse in Rotherham was much more widespread than acknowledged, and that the police had been aware of it for over a decade. His story, "Police files reveal vast child protection scandal", was based on 200 leaked documents, some from Jayne Senior, such as case files and letters from police and social services. The documents included Adele Weir's 2001 report for the Home Office, which linked 54 abused children to the Hussain family; 18 of the children had called Arshid Hussain their "boyfriend".

Cases highlighted by Norfolk included that of a 15-year-old having a broken bottle inserted into her; a 14-year-old being held in a flat and forced to have sex with five men; and a 13-year-old girl, "with disrupted clothing", found by police in a house at 3 am with a group of men who had given her vodka. A neighbour had called the police after hearing the girl scream. The girl was arrested for being drunk and disorderly, but the men were not questioned.

The newspaper cited a 2010 report by the police intelligence bureau that said, locally and nationally, and particularly in Sheffield and Rotherham, "there appears to be a significant problem with networks of Asian males exploiting young white females". South Yorkshire children were being trafficked to Birmingham, Bradford, Bristol, Dover, Manchester, and elsewhere, according to the police report. A document from Rotherham's Safeguarding Children Board reporting that the "crimes had 'cultural characteristics ... which are locally sensitive in terms of diversity'":

There are sensitivities of ethnicity with potential to endanger the harmony of community relationships. Great care will be taken in drafting ...this report to ensure that its findings embrace Rotherham's qualities of diversity. It is imperative that suggestions of a wider cultural phenomenon are avoided."

In August 2013 Norfolk published the story of a 15-year-old Rotherham girl, later revealed to be Sammy Woodhouse, who had been described in Adele Weir's report in 2001, and who was allowed by social services to maintain contact with Arshid Hussain, despite having been placed in care by her parents to protect her from him. (Hussain was jailed in 2016 for 35 years.) The girl had been made pregnant twice. One of those "aware of the relationship", according to the Times, was Jahangir Akhtar, then Rotherham Council's deputy leader, reportedly a relative of Hussain's. He resigned but denied the claims. Akhtar was one of the officials later described in the Casey report as wielding considerable influence on the council and reportedly known for shutting down discussion about the sexual abuse. Shortly after publication of the Times story, Rotherham Council commissioned the Jay inquiry.

== Weir report (2001) ==
=== Home Office pilot study ===
In 2000, solicitor Adele Weir (later Gladman) was hired by Rotherham Council as a research and development officer on a Home Office Crime Reduction Programme pilot study, "Tackling Prostitution: What Works". A section of the study was devoted to "young people and prostitution", and would cover Bristol, Sheffield and Rotherham. Weir was employed to write the report on Rotherham. Researchers at the University of Bedfordshire, including the social scientist Margaret Melrose, were involved as Home Office evaluators. Weir's line manager was the manager of Risky Business, and she was placed in the Risky Business offices in Rotherham's International Centre, where she worked with Jayne Senior. According to Weir, she encountered "poor professional practice from an early stage" from the council and police; child protection issues were, in her view, "disregarded, dismissed or minimized".

==== Mapping exercise ====
In response to a complaint from police that evidence of child abuse in Rotherham was anecdotal, Weir compiled a 10-page mapping exercise in 2001, showing what appeared to be a local abuse network. In evidence to the Home Affairs Committee in 2014, she said she had found "a small number of suspected abusers who were well known to all significant services in Rotherham." Using material obtained by Risky Business, and from health services, social services, police records, a homelessness project, and substance-misuse services, Weir's report included names of suspects, car registration numbers, links to local businesses and people outside the area, and the relationships between the suspects and the girls. The suspects included members of the Hussain family, who were jailed in 2016. Weir estimated at that point that there were 270 victims.

=== Home Office report ===
Weir's report for the Home Office evaluators linked 54 abused children to the Hussain family, as of October 2001. Eighteen children had named one of those men, Arshid Hussain, then around 25, as their "boyfriend", and several had become pregnant. One girl got pregnant twice when she was 14. She said social workers had expressed concern for the baby but not for her; she said that they maintained her relationship with him was consensual. In February 2016, Arshid Hussain was convicted of multiple rapes and jailed for 35 years. The Weir report said that members of the family were "alleged to be responsible for much of the violent crime and drug dealing in the town". They used untraceable mobile phones, had access to expensive cars, were linked to a taxi firm, and may have been involved in bed-and-breakfast hotels that were used by social services for emergency accommodation. Several girls sent to those hotels had been offered money, as soon as they arrived, if they would have sex with several men. Other girls were targeted at train and bus stations.

Weir handed her report to South Yorkshire Police, but was told it was "unhelpful". According to the Jay Report, one incident was, for Weir, the "final straw". A victim decided to file a complaint with the police. The perpetrators had smashed her parents' windows and broken her brothers' legs to stop her from reporting the rapes. Weir took her to the police station, but the victim received a text from the perpetrator to say he had her 11-year-old sister with him, and it was "your choice". This led the victim to believe someone had told the perpetrator she was at the police station, and she decided not to proceed with the complaint. Following this, with the consent of her manager, Weir wrote in October 2001 to Mike Hedges, the Chief Constable of South Yorkshire Police, and to Christine Burbeary, the District Commander. The letter said:

I have been visiting agencies, encouraging them to relay information to the police. Their responses have been identical—they have ceased passing on information as they perceive this to be a waste of time. Parents also have ceased to make missing person reports, a precursor to any child abduction investigation, as the police response is often so inappropriate. ... Children are being left at risk and their abusers unapprehended.

The letter was not well received by the council or police. During a meeting at Rotherham police station with senior police and council officials, they seemed incensed that Weir had written to the Chief Constable. Jayne Senior, who was present, said Weir was subjected to a "tirade that lasted I don't know how long". According to Weir, at some point after this an official warned her against mentioning Asian men and booked a diversity training course for her. (Note: According to Weir: "She [the official] said you must never refer to that again. You must never refer to Asian men. And her other response was to book me on a two-day ethnicity and diversity course to raise my awareness of ethnic issues.)

=== Files removed ===
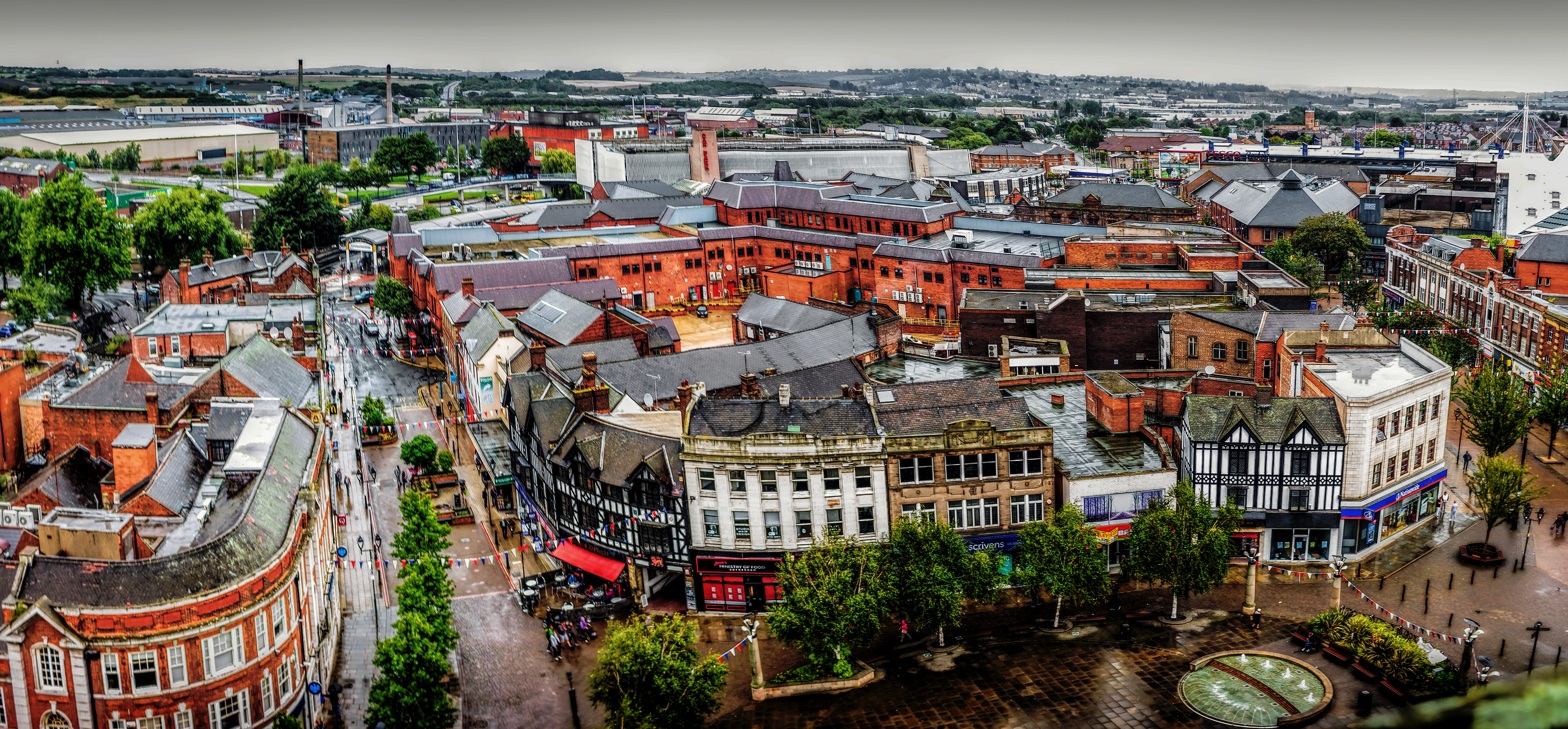
Rotherham town centre, September 2016

At their request, Weir sent her data to the Home Office evaluators in Bedfordshire in April 2002, which reportedly upset the Risky Business manager. Around 18 April 2002, when she arrived at work, Weir said she discovered her Home Office pilot data had been removed from the Risky Business office. (Note: Adele Weir (in evidence to the Home Affairs Committee, 2014): "I was told that over the weekend somebody had gained access to the Risky Business office, opened the filing cabinets and removed all of the data relating to the Home Office work. To be clear to the committee that involved accessing the grounds of the International Centre; gaining access to the Centre itself; disarming the alarm; moving through a key coded and locked security door; unlocking the door to the part of the building where the project office was located; unlocking the door to the project office itself; unlocking a desk and finding the keys to the filing cabinets; identifying which filing cabinet had my Home Office pilot data in it; and removing my data but nothing else. There were no signs of a forced entry.") According to Weir's evidence to the Home Affairs Committee, documents had been deleted. She also said that someone had created, on the password-protected office computer, the minutes of meetings that Weir had purportedly attended, which showed her agreeing to certain conditions, such as not submitting data to Home Office evaluators without her line manager's consent. Weir told the committee that she had not agreed to those conditions or attended any such meeting. She said one of the meetings had taken place while she was on holiday overseas.

Weir was told that social services, the police and education staff had met over the weekend, and had decided that Risky Business staff were "exceeding [their] roles". Weir was suspended for an "act of gross misconduct" after having included in her report data from confidential minutes, but she reportedly negotiated a return to work by demonstrating her manager had passed those minutes to the Home Office evaluators. She was told she would no longer have access to Risky Business data, meetings, or the girls. In June 2002 she was asked to amend her report to "anonymise individuals and institutions and only include facts and evidence that you are able to substantiate". The Jay Report said the secrecy surrounding the report and the treatment of Weir was "deeply troubling": "If the senior people concerned had paid more attention to the content of the report, more might have been done to help children who were being violently exploited and abused."

== Heal reports (2002–2006) ==
=== 2002 report ===
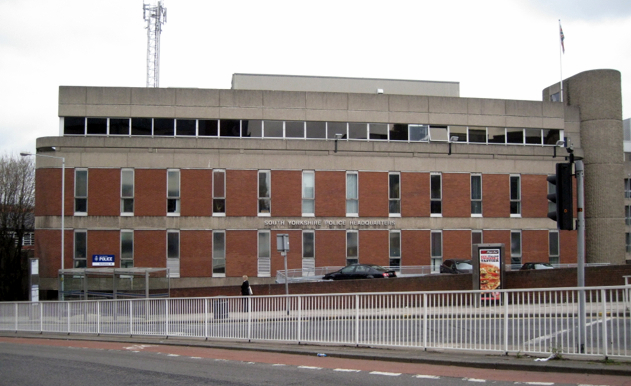
South Yorkshire Police headquarters, Snig Hill, Sheffield

In 2002–2007 South Yorkshire Police hired Angie Heal, a strategic drugs analyst, to carry out research on drug use and supply in the area. Working in the drug strategy unit with two police officers, Heal wrote several reports during this period. She first encountered examples of organised child sexual abuse in 2002 while researching the local supply of crack cocaine, and consulted Jayne Senior of Risky Business and Anne Lucas, the child exploitation service officer in Sheffield. Lucas explained that part of the grooming process was to give the children drugs. Heal's first report in 2002 recommended dealing with the child-abuse rings; if the evidence was lacking to prosecute for sex offences, they could be prosecuted for drugs offences instead. Heal wrote in 2017 that her report was widely read, but she "could not believe the complete lack of interest" in the links she had provided between the local drug trade and child abuse.

=== 2003 report ===
Heal decided to continue researching the issue and included CSE in her bi-annual intelligence briefings. While Heal was preparing her second report, Sexual Exploitation, Drug Use and Drug Dealing: Current Situation in South Yorkshire (2003), Jayne Senior secretly shared with her Adele Weir's Home Office report from 2002. Heal wrote that she actually felt scared after she had read it, given the level of detail, the lack of interest, and the sidelining of Weir. Heal's 2003 report noted that Rotherham had a "significant number of girls and some boys who are being sexually exploited"; that the victims were being gang raped, kidnapped and subjected to other violence; that a significant number had become pregnant, and were depressed, angry and self-harming; and that Risky Business had identified four of the perpetrators as brothers. Heal created two versions of her report. One was for wider distribution among officials; the second, for the police alone, contained the names of the perpetrators, obtained from Risky Business.

=== 2006 report ===
In 2005, a new department of children and young people's services was created, with Councillor Shaun Wright appointed cabinet member for the department. In March 2006, the conference "Every Child Matters, But Do They Know it?" was held in Rotherham to discuss children's sexual exploitation. Heal's third report, Violence and Gun Crime: Links with Sexual Exploitation, Prostitution and Drug Markets in South Yorkshire (2006), noted that the situation was continuing and involved "systematic physical and sexual violence against young women". The victims were being trafficked to other towns, and the violence used was "very severe". If the girls protested, the perpetrators threatened to involve the girls' younger sisters, friends and family. There had also been an increase in reports of the perpetrators being seen with guns.

In Heal's study, the majority of identified victims in Yorkshire were White British girls, targeted from age 11; the average age was 12–13. British Asian girls were also targeted, but even less was known about the number of Asian victims, because their abuse was not part of the same scene, and therefore poorly understood by researchers. The most significant group of perpetrators of localised grooming were British Asian men. Heal wrote that several employees dealing with the issue believed that the perpetrators' ethnicity was preventing the abuse from being addressed. One worker said that British-Asian taxi drivers in Rotherham had been involved for 30 years, but in the 1970s the crimes had not been organised. Heal added that a high-profile publicity campaign was underway about the trafficking of women from Eastern Europe, with posters in Doncaster Sheffield Airport, while the issue of local trafficking "appears to be largely ignored". The report recommended: "More emphasis should be placed on tackling the abusers, rather than the abused."

Heal sent her 2006 report to everyone involved in the Rotherham Drugs Partnership, and to the South Yorkshire Police district commander and chief superintendents. Shortly after this, according to the Jay report, Risky Business's funding was increased, and the council's Safeguarding Children Board approved an "Action Plan for responding to the sexual exploitation of children and young people in Rotherham". Heal said that, around this time, it became clear she was being sidelined. The drug strategy unit was disbanded, and she was told that several officers in her department were not supportive of her work. She has said the lack of support "will never fail to astonish and sadden" her. She left the South Yorkshire Police in March 2007. Her 2003 and 2006 reports were released by South Yorkshire Police in May 2015 following a Freedom of Information Act request.

== Home Affairs Committee (2013–2014) ==
=== Initial hearing and report (2013) ===
The House of Commons Home Affairs Committee began hearing evidence about localised grooming in June 2012, as a result of the Rotherham convictions in 2010 (Operation Central), Andrew Norfolk's articles in the Times, and the Rochdale child sex abuse ring (Operation Span), which saw 12 men convicted in May 2012. The committee published its report, Child sexual exploitation and the response to localised grooming, in June 2013, with a follow-up in October 2014 in response to the Jay report.

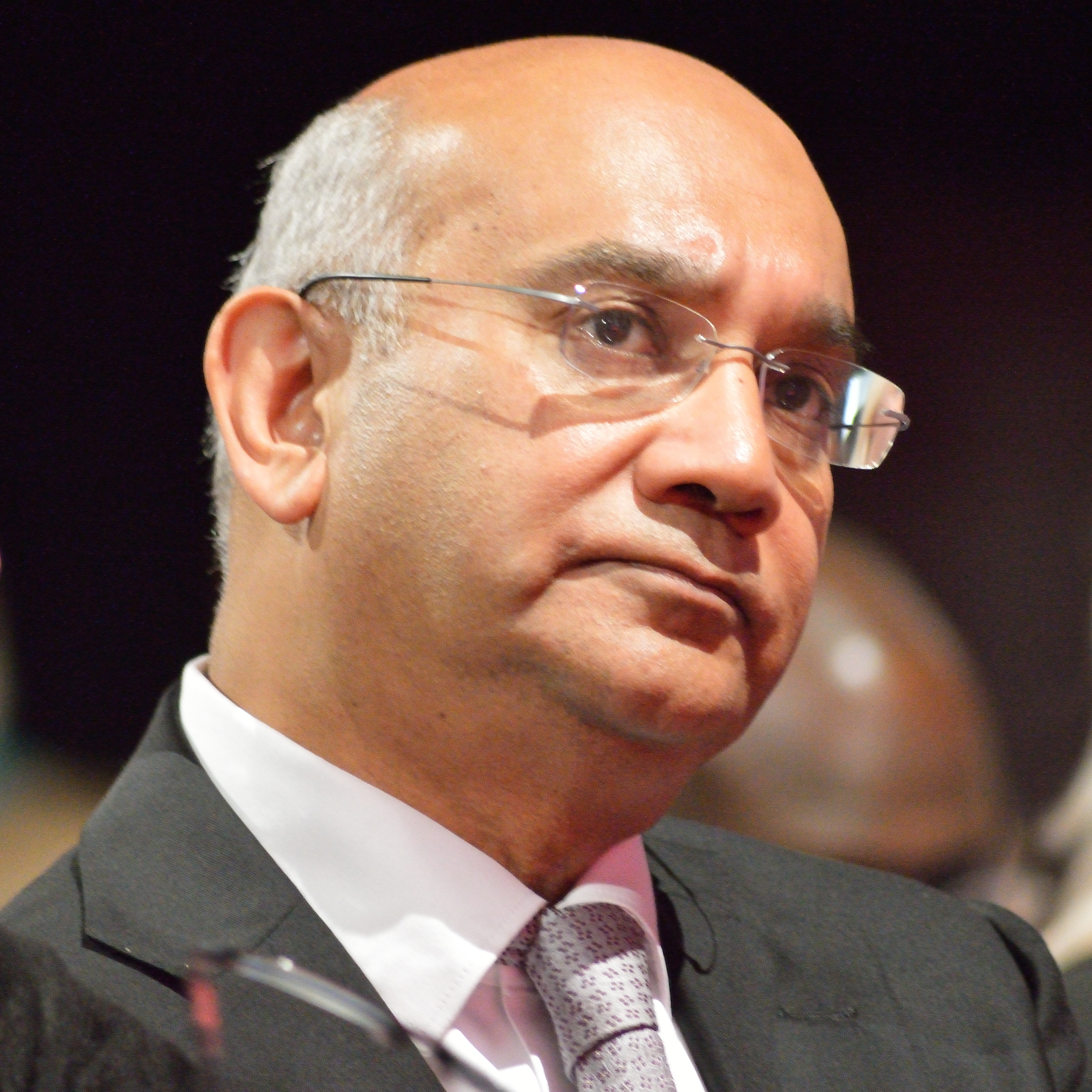
Keith Vaz, chair of the Home Affairs Committee, 2007–2016

In October 2012 the committee criticised South Yorkshire's chief constable, David Crompton, and one of its senior officers, Philip Etheridge. The committee heard evidence that three members of a family connected with the abuse of 61 girls had not been charged, and no action was taken when a 22-year-old man was found in a car with a 12-year-old girl, with indecent images of her on his phone. Crompton said that "ethnic origin" was not a factor in deciding whether to charge suspects. The committee said that they were very concerned, as was the public. In January 2013 the committee summoned the head of Rotherham Council, Martin Kimber, to explain the lack of arrests, despite South Yorkshire Police saying it was conducting investigations and the council having identified 58 young girls at risk. committee chair, Keith Vaz, questioned why, after five Asian men were jailed in 2010, more was not done: "In Lancashire there were 100 prosecutions the year before last, in South Yorkshire there were no prosecutions." The council apologised for the "systemic failure" that had "let down" the victims.

During a hearing in September 2014 to discuss Rotherham, Vaz told Crompton that the committee was shocked by the evidence, and that it held South Yorkshire Police responsible. Asked about an incident in which a 13-year-old found in a flat with a group of men was arrested for being drunk and disorderly, Crompton said it would be referred to the Independent Police Complaints Commission.

=== Follow-up report (2014) ===
The committee's follow-up report on 18 October 2014 detailed the disappearance of Adele Weir's files containing data on the abuse from the Risky Business office in 2002. The allegations were made in private hearings. Keith Vaz said: "The proliferation of revelations about files which can no longer be located gives rise to public suspicion of a deliberate cover-up. The only way to address these concerns is with a full, transparent and urgent investigation." The report called for new legislation to allow the removal of elected Police and Crime Commissioners following a vote of no confidence.

== Jay Report (2014) ==
In October 2013, Rotherham Council commissioned Alexis Jay, a former chief social work adviser to the Scottish government, to conduct an independent inquiry into Rotherham Council's handling of child sexual exploitation reports since 1997. The Independent Inquiry into Child Sexual Exploitation in Rotherham, or Jay Report, was published on 26 August 2014. It said that, as a "conservative estimate", at least 1,400 children had been sexually exploited in Rotherham between 1997 and 2013. (Note: Jay report (2014): "...the Inquiry concluded that an at least 1400 children were sexually exploited between 1997 and 2013. This is likely to be a conservative estimate of the true scale of the problem. We are unable to assess the numbers of other children who may have been at risk of exploitation, or those who were exploited but not known to any agency. This includes some who were forced to witness other children being assaulted and abused.") According to the report, children as young as 11 were "raped by multiple perpetrators, abducted, trafficked to other cities in England, beaten and intimidated".

Taxi drivers were a "common thread", picking up children for sex from schools and care homes. The inquiry team found examples of extreme threats, violence and rape. (Note: Reports included "a child [who] was doused in petrol and threatened with being set alight, children who were threatened with guns, children who witnessed brutally violent rapes and were threatened that they would be the next victim if they told anyone. Girls as young as 11 were raped by large numbers of male perpetrators, one after the other.") According to the report, one child withdrew her statements after she received a text threatening her sister. At least two other families were intimidated and felt unable to go to the police. According to the report, the police had shown a lack of respect for the victims in the early 2000s, deeming them "undesirables" unworthy of police protection. The concerns of Jayne Senior, the former youth worker, were met with "indifference and scorn". Several council staff described themselves as being nervous about identifying the ethnic origins of perpetrators for fear of being thought racist, since most were of Pakistani heritage; others, the report said, "remembered clear direction from their managers" not to make such identification.

The report noted the experience of Adele Weir, the Home Office researcher, who attempted to raise concerns about the abuse with senior police officers in 2002; she was told not to do so again, and was subsequently sidelined. In some instances, fathers who had tracked down their daughters and tried to remove them from houses where they were being abused were themselves arrested by police. Staff described Rotherham Council as macho, sexist and bullying. There were sexist and harassing comments to female employees, particularly during 1997–2009. The Jay report noted that "[t]he existence of such a culture ... is likely to have impeded the Council from providing an effective, corporate response to such a highly sensitive social problem as child sexual exploitation." Several people who spoke to the Jay inquiry were concerned that Rotherham Council officials were connected to the perpetrators through business interests such as the taxi firm; the police said there was no evidence of this.

=== Ethnic, religious and cultural factors ===
The Jay Report did not specify the ethnicity of the victims or the perpetrators, but it said: "In a large number of the historic cases in particular, most of the victims in the cases we sampled were white British children, and the majority of the perpetrators were from minority ethnic communities." It also described other, less investigated cases in which Asian women and girls were the primary victims, despite the belief that the victims were only white. Social isolation and fear of dishonour prevented Asian victims from coming forward. The report further said that "there is no simple link between race and child sexual exploitation, and across the UK the greatest numbers of perpetrators of CSE are white men". The ethnicity of offenders has also increased community tensions and led to far-right marches and violence in the town. An 81-year-old man was murdered by two white men who called him a "groomer" as they attacked him.

==== Underreporting due to ethnicity, religion or culture ====
According to the Muslim Women's Network UK, cited in the Jay Report, Asian victims may be particularly vulnerable to threats of bringing shame and dishonour to their families, and may have believed that reporting the abuse would be an admission they had violated their cultural beliefs. One of the local Pakistani women's groups had described Pakistani girls being targeted by Pakistani taxi drivers and landlords, but they feared reporting to the police out of concerns for their marriage prospects. The report suggested "the under-reporting of exploitation and abuse in minority ethnic communities" should be addressed.

In response to claims that social services had failed to act through political correctness, the Jay Report "found no evidence of children's social care staff being influenced by concerns about the ethnic origins of suspected perpetrators when dealing with individual child protection cases, including CSE". In 2021, an investigation by the Times suggested South Yorkshire Police was not routinely recording the ethnicity of child sexual abuse suspects. In Rotherham, police omitted suspect ethnicity in 67% of cases. The force said it had increased reporting of ethnicity since 2019.

=== Aftermath ===
Following the Jay Report, Roger Stone, Labour leader of Rotherham Council, and Martin Kimber, its chief executive, both resigned. Joyce Thacker, the council's director of children's services, and Shaun Wright, the Police and Crime Commissioner (PCC) for South Yorkshire Police from 2012—and Labour councillor in charge of child safety at the council from 2005 to 2010—stepped down in September 2014, under pressure. Wright was asked to step down by Theresa May, then Home Secretary, as well as by members of his own party, including Rotherham's Labour MP Sarah Champion. He resigned from the Labour Party, on 27 August 2014, after an ultimatum by the party to do so or face suspension.

Roger Stone was suspended from the Labour Party, as were councillors Gwendoline Russell and Shaukat Ali, and former deputy council leader Jahangir Akhtar, who had lost his council seat in 2014. Malcolm Newsam was appointed as Children's Social Care Commissioner in October 2014, and subsequently Ian Thomas was appointed as interim director of children's services.

=== Reception ===
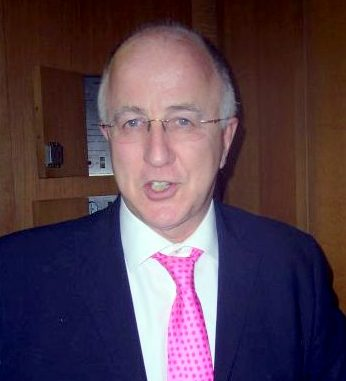
Denis MacShane

The Jay Report received extensive news coverage. In response, David Crompton, Chief Constable of South Yorkshire Police from 2012 to 2016, invited the National Crime Agency to conduct an independent inquiry. Keith Vaz, then chair of the Home Affairs Committee, told Meredydd Hughes, Chief Constable from 2004 to 2011, that Hughes had failed abuse victims. Theresa May, then Home Secretary, accused the authorities of a "dereliction of duty". She blamed several factors, including Rotherham Council's "institutionalised political correctness", inadequate scrutiny and culture of covering things up, combined with a fear of being seen as racist and a "disdainful attitude" toward the children. (Note: Theresa May (2 September 2014): "Professor Alexis Jay's report into child sexual exploitation in Rotherham between 1997 and 2013 is a terrible account of the appalling failures by Rotherham council, the police and other agencies to protect vulnerable children. What happened was a complete dereliction of duty. ... My right hon. Friend the Secretary of State for Communities and Local Government shares my concerns over the failings by Rotherham council that have been identified. This includes the inadequate scrutiny by councillors, institutionalised political correctness, the covering up of information and the failure to take action against gross misconduct. ... I am clear that cultural concerns—both the fear of being seen as racist and the disdainful attitude to some of our most vulnerable children—must never stand in the way of child protection.") Denis MacShane, MP for Rotherham from 1994 until his resignation in 2012 for claiming false expenses, blamed a culture of "not wanting to rock the multicultural community boat". Simon Danczuk, Labour MP for Rochdale, where similar cases were prosecuted, argued that ethnicity, class and the night-time economy were all factors, adding that "a very small minority" in the Asian community have an unhealthy view of women, and that an "unhealthy brand of politics 'imported' from Pakistan", which involved "looking after your own", was partly to blame.

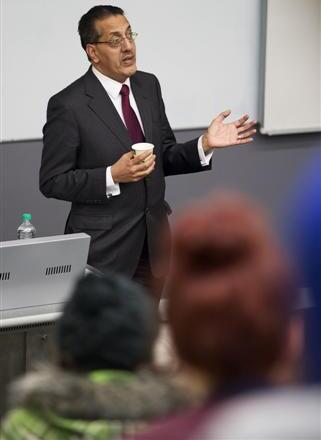
Nazir Afzal

British Muslims and members of the British-Pakistani community condemned both the abuse and that it had been covered up. Nazir Afzal, Chief Crown Prosecutor of the Crown Prosecution Service (CPS) for North West England from 2011 to 2015, made the decision in 2011 to prosecute the Rochdale child sex abuse ring after the CPS had turned the case down. Responding to the Jay Report, he said the abuse had no basis in Islam: "Islam says that alcohol, drugs, rape and abuse are all forbidden, yet these men were surrounded by all of these things." Afzal suggested the cases were about male power: "It is not the abusers' race that defines them. It is their attitude to women that defines them." He also said the handling of the cases was a matter of incompetence rather than political correctness, and said that the nature of the night-time economy skewed the picture—more Pakistani-heritage men work at night and might therefore be more involved in that kind of activity. The incoming director of children's services in Rotherham, Ian Thomas, said that the "night-time economy is full of white blokes". Alexis Jay said that working in the night-time economy "presents an opportunity but it doesn't present a motive".

The UK Hindu Council and the Sikh Federation asked that the perpetrators be described as Pakistani Muslims, rather than Asian. Far-right groups Britain First and the English Defence League staged protests in Rotherham, as did Unite Against Fascism.

== Casey inquiry (2015) ==
Following the Jay report, the Secretary of State for Communities and Local Government, Eric Pickles, commissioned an independent inspection of Rotherham Council. Led by Louise Casey, director-general of the government's Troubled Families programme, the inspection examined the council's governance, services for children and young people, and taxi and private-hire licensing.

Published in February 2015, the Casey report concluded that Rotherham Council was "not fit for purpose". Casey identified a culture of "bullying, sexism ... and misplaced 'political correctness'", along with a history of covering up information and silencing whistleblowers. The child-sexual-exploitation team was poorly directed, suffered from excessive case loads, and did not share information. The council had a history of failing to deal with issues around race: "Staff perceived that there was only a small step between mentioning the ethnicity of perpetrators and being labelled a racist." The Pakistani-heritage councillors were left to deal with all issues pertaining to that community, which left them able to exert disproportionate influence, while white councillors ignored their responsibilities. Councillor Jahangir Akhtar, in particular, was named as too influential, including regarding police matters.

In February 2015, the government replaced its elected officers with a team of five commissioners, including one tasked specifically with looking at children's services. Files relating to one current and one former councillor identifying "a number of potentially criminal matters" were passed to the National Crime Agency. The leader of the council, Paul Lakin, resigned, and members of the council cabinet also stood down.

== Independent Police Complaints Commission investigation (2020) ==
The Independent Police Complaints Commission (IPCC) began an investigation into allegations of police wrongdoing following the Jay report. It was the second-largest inquiry the IPCC has undertaken after the inquiry into the 1989 Hillsborough football disaster in Sheffield; that game was policed by South Yorkshire Police. As of March 2017 nine inquiries were complete, with no case to answer regarding officer conduct, but recommendations were made to the force about the recording of information. Another 53 investigations were underway.

According to Andrew Norfolk in The Times, one Rotherham police officer had been in regular contact with one of the perpetrators. In one incident in March 2000, he and a local taxi driver—who later became a Rotherham councillor—are alleged to have arranged for Arshid Hussain, arguably the gang's ringleader, to hand a girl over to police at a petrol station "in exchange for immunity". Another complaint concerned the same officer, who reportedly asked two of the victims out on a date. One victim reported this to police in August 2013, but no action was taken. The IPCC was also investigating the officer who failed to act on the report. The first officer died in January 2015 after being hit by a car in Sheffield, in an unrelated accident.

A five-year investigation by the Independent Office for Police Conduct (IOPC) found that the Rotherham police ignored the sexual abuse of children for decades for fear of increasing racial tensions. The IOPC upheld a complaint from the father of one of the victims that police took "insufficient action". The complainant claims he was told by a police officer the town "would erupt" if it became known that Asian men were regularly sexually abusing underage girls.

== Home Office Report (2020) ==
The Rotherham case was among several cases which prompted investigations into the claim that the majority of perpetrators from grooming gangs were British Pakistani. The first, by Quilliam, was published in December 2017, and claimed 84% of offenders were of South Asian heritage. This report was criticised by child sexual exploitation experts Ella Cockbain and Waqas Tufail in a scholarly paper in January 2020. A further investigation was carried out by the British government in December 2020. The Home Office investigation suggested the majority of child sexual exploitation gangs were, in fact, composed of white men and not British Pakistani men.

"Beyond specific high-profile cases, the academic literature highlights significant limitations to what can be said about links between ethnicity and this form of offending. Research has found that group-based CSE offenders are most commonly White. Some studies suggest an over-representation of Black and Asian offenders relative to the demographics of national populations. However, it is not possible to conclude that this is representative of all group-based CSE offending. This is due to issues such as data quality problems, the way the samples were selected in studies, and the potential for bias and inaccuracies in the way that ethnicity data is collected"; the report also added "Based on the existing evidence, and our understanding of the flaws in the existing data, it seems most likely that the ethnicity of group-based CSE offenders is in line with CSA [child sexual abuse] more generally and with the general population, with the majority of offenders being White".

Writing in The Guardian, Cockbain and Tufail wrote of the report that "The two-year study by the Home Office makes very clear that there are no grounds for asserting that Muslim or Pakistani-heritage men are disproportionately engaged in such crimes, and, citing our research, it confirmed the unreliability of the Quilliam claim". In the foreword to the Report, the Home Secretary Priti Patel stated that: "Some studies have indicated an over-representation of Asian and Black offenders. However, it is difficult to draw conclusions about the ethnicity of offenders as existing research is limited and data collection is poor. This is disappointing because community and cultural factors are clearly relevant to understanding and tackling offending." A 2020 report by CEOP indicated that in the records of defendants prosecuted for child sexual abuse offences, Asians were actually underrepresented among the child sexual abuse offenders in the country.

The 2025 Baroness Casey's report noted that the data of the 2020 Home Office report "does not include sufficient ethnicity data to conclude that the majority of offenders are White", which made it "hard to understand how the Home Office reached the conclusion in their paper that the ethnicity of group-based child sexual exploitation offenders is likely to be in line with child sexual abuse more generally and with the general population i.e. "with the majority of offenders being White."

== Baroness Casey's National Audit 2025 ==
In 2025, Baroness Casey published findings that despite flaws in data collection, there was enough local data from three police forces – Greater Manchester, South Yorkshire and West Yorkshire – that showed that disproportionate numbers of Asian men were involved in child sex grooming gangs. On the specific case of Operation Stovewood in Rotherham, the report noted that of the 323 child sex abuse suspects and the 42 individuals convicted, nearly two-thirds were of Pakistani ethnic background. Nationally, in two-thirds of cases the ethnicity of the perpetrators was not recorded, which made it impossible to draw conclusions at a national level, or to assess the scale of the issue. The report found "obfuscation" when examining the ethnicity of offenders, and said that the claims that there is overwhelming problem with White perpetrators "can't be proved", and that "flawed data is used repeatedly to dismiss claims about 'Asian grooming gangs' as sensationalised, biased or untrue". The report said that the ethnicity of perpetrators had been "shied away from"; and in an interview, she said that information on race and ethnicity had been covered up, and in one case found the word "Pakistani" had been tippexed out in a children's file in archive.

Casey called for a national inquiry having previously rejected the idea. She had changed her mind due to the failure of many local councils to set up their own inquiries and the reluctance of some organisations to talk to her own investigators.

== Statutory inquiry (2026) ==
The Prime Minister, Keir Starmer, announced two days before the Casey audit report was published that there would be a full national statutory inquiry into grooming gangs. Under the Inquiries Act 2005, the minister who sets up an inquiry must appoint a chairman and set terms of reference by an instrument in writing.

On 9 December 2025, Home Secretary Shabana Mahmood made a statement to Parliament announcing the Independent Inquiry into Grooming Gangs, its panel with Baroness Anne Longfield as its chair, and draft terms of reference to be confirmed no later than March 2026.

== Ethnic, religious and cultural factors ==
The Jay Report (2014) estimated there were at least 1,400 victims in Rotherham. While it did not specify the ethnicity of the victims or the perpetrators, it said: "In a large number of the historic cases in particular, most of the victims in the cases we sampled were white British children, and the majority of the perpetrators were from minority ethnic communities." Operation Stovewood reported that most victims were white girls and about 80% of perpetrators were males of Pakistani heritage. The Jay Report also described other, less investigated cases in which Asian women and girls were the primary victims, despite the belief that the victims were only white. Social isolation and fear of dishonour prevented Asian victims from coming forward. The report further said that "there is no simple link between race and child sexual exploitation, and across the UK the greatest numbers of perpetrators of CSE are white men". The ethnicity of offenders has also increased community tensions and led to far-right marches and violence in the town. An 81-year-old man was murdered by two white men who called him a "groomer" as they attacked him.

=== Underreporting due to ethnicity, religion or culture ===
According to the Muslim Women's Network UK, Asian victims may be particularly vulnerable to threats of bringing shame and dishonour to their families, and may have believed that reporting the abuse would be an admission they had violated their cultural beliefs. One of the local Pakistani women's groups had described Pakistani girls being targeted by Pakistani taxi drivers and landlords, but they feared reporting to the police out of concerns for their marriage prospects. The report suggested "the under-reporting of exploitation and abuse in minority ethnic communities" should be addressed.

In response to claims that social services had failed to act through political correctness, the Jay Report "found no evidence of children's social care staff being influenced by concerns about the ethnic origins of suspected perpetrators when dealing with individual child protection cases, including CSE". In 2021, an investigation by the Times suggested South Yorkshire Police was not routinely recording the ethnicity of child sexual abuse suspects. In Rotherham, police omitted suspect ethnicity in 67% of cases. The force said it had increased reporting of ethnicity since 2019.

== See also ==
- Child sexual abuse in the United Kingdom
- Independent Inquiry into Child Sexual Abuse
- Aylesbury child sex abuse ring
- Banbury child sex abuse ring
- Bristol child sex abuse ring
- Derby child sex abuse ring
- Halifax child sex abuse ring
- Huddersfield sex abuse ring
- Keighley child sex abuse ring
- Manchester child sex abuse ring
- Newcastle sex abuse ring
- North Wales child abuse scandal
- Oulu child sexual exploitation scandal
- Oxford child sex abuse ring
- Peterborough sex abuse case
- Rochdale child sex abuse ring
- Telford child sexual exploitation scandal
- List of sexual abuses perpetrated by groups

== Works cited ==
The article cites the following books and reports. All other sources are listed in the References section only.

- Boyd, Iain (July 2015). "Being Heard: A Thematic Analysis of the Newspaper Media Response to the Jay Report and the Rotherham Child Abuse Scandal" (PDF). University of Hertfordshire. Archived from the original (PDF) on 11 August 2017.
- Cantrill, Pat (April 2011). Serious Case Review Overview Report. In respect of: Child S (PDF). Rotherham: Rotherham Borough Council. Archived from the original (PDF) on 11 August 2017.
- Casey, Louise (4 February 2015). Report of Inspection of Rotherham Metropolitan Borough Council (PDF). London: Department for Communities and Local Government. ISBN 978-1-4741-1507-0.
- Drew, John (23 March 2016). An independent review of South Yorkshire Police's handling of child sexual exploitation 1997–2016 (PDF). drewreview.uk.
- Gladman, Adele; Heal, Angie (2017). Child Sexual Exploitation After Rotherham. London: Jessica Kingsley Publisher. ISBN 978-1-7845-0276-8.
- Heal, Angie (August 2003). Sexual Exploitation, Drug Use and Drug Dealing: The Current Situation in South Yorkshire (PDF). London: Local Government Chronicle.
- Heal, Angie (March 2006). A Problem Profile—Violence and Gun Crime: Links with Sexual Exploitation, Prostitution and Drug Markets in South Yorkshire (PDF). London: Local Government Chronicle.
- Heal, Angie (9 September 2014). "Supplementary written evidence submitted by Dr Angie Heal" (PDF). London: House of Commons Home Affairs Committee.
- Hester, Marianne; Westmarland, Nicole (2004). Tackling Street Prostitution: Towards an holistic approach (PDF). London: Home Office Research, Development and Statistics Directorate. ISBN 1844733068. Archived from the original (PDF) on 22 April 2017.
- Hollington, Kris (2013). Unthinkable: The Shocking Scandal of the UK Sex Traffickers. London: Simon & Schuster. ISBN 978-1-47111-455-7.
- Home Affairs Committee (a) (10 June 2013). Child sexual exploitation and the response to localised grooming. Second Report of Session 2013–14, Vol. 1 (PDF). London: House of Commons, The Stationery Office Limited.
- Home Affairs Committee (b) (12 June 2013). Child sexual exploitation and the response to localised grooming. Second Report of Session 2013–14, Vol. 2 (PDF). London: House of Commons, The Stationery Office Limited.
- Home Affairs Committee (c) (15 October 2014). Child sexual exploitation and the response to localised grooming: follow-up. Sixth Report of Session 2014–15 (PDF). London: House of Commons, The Stationery Office Limited.
- Jay, Alexis (21 August 2014). Independent Inquiry into Child Sexual Exploitation in Rotherham (1997–2013). Rotherham: Rotherham Metropolitan Borough Council.
- Senior, Jayne (2016). Broken and Betrayed: The true story of the Rotherham abuse scandal by the woman who fought to expose it. London: Pan Macmillan. ISBN 9781509801619.
- Weir, Adele (23 October 2001). "Letter" (PDF). London: House of Commons, The Stationery Office Ltd.
- Weir, Adele (2002). "Chapter Four: Key Achievements of the Home Office Pilot" (PDF). Home Affairs Committee. (This draft document shows the anonymised evaluation results of Adele Weir's 2000–2002 Home Office pilot study in Rotherham. Risky Business is referred to as the "Project". The reports about other towns in the pilot study were published, but the Rotherham chapter was not. It was first published in 2014 as part of the Jay report and again by the Home Affairs Committee.)
- Weir, Adele (15 October 2014). "Summary of evidence to Home Affairs Committee". London: House of Commons, The Stationery Office Ltd.
- Wilson, Sarah; McKelvie, Geraldine (2015). Violated: A Shocking and Harrowing Survival Story from the Notorious Rotherham Abuse Scandal. London: Harper Element. ISBN 978-00081-4126-4.
