= Child sex ring =

Group of people involved sexually with multiple minors

A child sex ring, also referred to as a pedophile ring, pedophile network, pedophile cell, paedophile gang, grooming gang (in British English), and child abuse ring, is a group of adults who are simultaneously involved sexually with multiple minors during the same general time frame. The dynamics of these rings differ from those of more common one-on-one intrafamilial cases in that they are more organized and run over a long period of time. Commercialization and group sex are not necessarily present.

== Prevalence ==
In 1989, a study indicated 31 child sex rings identified by police within a geographically separated population of 710,000 during two years in UK. In the two years, they accounted for 4.6% of all reported child sexual abuse. Forty-seven male offenders aged 16 to 82 years and 334 victims aged 4 to 15 were involved. The offenders usually operated in pairs or alone. Three of the rings were becoming semicommercial. Some children acted as victim recruiters for the offenders in 22 rings. The recruiters usually receive the money. The reported abuse included masturbation and fondling in 30 rings, oral, anal, or vaginal intercourse in 21 rings, as well as production of child pornography in 2 rings.

== Offenders and mode of operation ==
Child sex rings operate like pipelines. New members are regularly recruited, seduced, abused, and later 'dumped'. They often involve educational or recreational organizations where they can be recruited and seduced. The seduction often involves acts of kindness and giving gifts to the victims to lower their inhibitions and to gain their cooperation and trust. One of the factors that facilitates the recruitment of children is peer pressure from observing the behavior of other children participating in the ring. The offenders tend to be from a higher socio-economic background, as running a child sex ring requires high interpersonal skills and economic resources. It often means a financial loss for the offenders.

== Notable cases ==
Case	Country	Victims
Aylesbury child sex abuse ring	UK	2 girls
Banbury child sex abuse ring	UK	7 underaged girls
Berkhamsted paedophile network	UK	7 girls aged from 13 to 15
Bolivian Mennonite gas-facilitated rapes	Bolivia	at least 151, in particular women and girls
Bristol child sex abuse ring	UK	underaged girls
Casa Pia child sexual abuse scandal	Portugal	100 boys
Sidney Cooke's "Dirty Dozen"	UK	up to 20 boys
Derby child sex abuse ring	UK	26 girls from 12 to 18
UN child sexual abuse scandal in Haiti	Haiti	9 children
Halifax child sex abuse ring	UK	underaged girls
Huddersfield grooming gang	UK	18 girls from 11 to 17
Jersey child abuse investigation	UK	underaged boys and girls
Keighley child sex abuse ring	UK	underaged girls
Kidwelly sex cult	UK	underaged girls
Kincora Boys' Home	UK	underaged boys
Manchester child sex abuse ring	UK	girls from 12 to 15
Norwich sexual abuse ring	UK	2 boys and 3 girls under 13
Oulu child sexual exploitation scandal	Finland	girls under 15
Oxford child sex abuse ring	UK	underaged girls
2004 Pitcairn Islands sexual assault trial	UK	underaged girls
Quedlinburg child sex abuse ring	Germany	2 underaged girls
Rochdale child sex abuse ring	UK	47 underaged girls
Rotherham child sexual exploitation scandal	UK	1,400 girls
Telford child sexual exploitation scandal	UK	up to 1,000 girls
North Wales child abuse scandal	UK	underaged boys and girls

== Public perception and reaction ==
Speaking after the James Machin case in 2010, Det Insp Simon Snell expressed his opinion about the paedophile ring in Cornwall as follow: "They are despicable, horrible, nasty individuals who preyed on vulnerable young children."

== See also ==
- List of pedophile advocacy organizations
- Marc Dutroux
- Jeffrey Epstein and Ghislaine Maxwell
