= List of sexual abuses perpetrated by groups =

Following is a list of articles about notable sexual abuses perpetrated by groups, ordered by countries of occurrence:

== Oceania ==
=== Pitcairn Islands ===
- Pitcairn sexual assault trial of 2004

=== Australia ===
- Ashfield gang rapes
- Catholic sexual abuse cases in Australia
- Mount Rennie rape case
- Oombulgurri Community, Western Australia
- Sexual abuse scandal in Canberra and Goulburn archdiocese
- Sydney gang rapes

== Africa ==
- Rape during the Rwandan genocide
- Rape during the First and Second Congo Wars
- Sexual violence in the Democratic Republic of the Congo
- Rape during the Sierra Leone Civil War
- Rape during the Darfur genocide
- Sexual violence in the Tigray war
- Chibok schoolgirls kidnapping
- Aboke abductions
- South Sudanese Civil War#Sexual violence

== Europe ==
- Casa Pia child sexual abuse scandal
- Marc Dutroux and Michel Nihoul
- Marocchinate
- Oulu child sexual exploitation scandal
- Rape during the liberation of France
- Rape during the Soviet occupation of Poland
- Mazan rapes

=== Bosnia and Herzegovina ===
- Foča massacres
- Omarska camp
- Rape during the Bosnian War
- Sušica camp
- Trnopolje camp
- Uzamnica camp
- Vilina Vlas
- Doboj massacre

=== Germany ===
- German camp brothels in World War II
- German military brothels in World War II
- New Year's Eve sexual assaults in Germany
- Rape during the occupation of Germany

=== Republic of Ireland ===
- Sexual abuse in Limerick diocese
- Sexual abuse in Raphoe diocese
- Sexual abuse scandal in the Catholic archdiocese of Dublin
- Sexual abuse scandal in the Catholic Diocese of Galway, Kilmacduagh and Kilfenora

=== Sweden ===
- 2017 Uppsala rape
- We Are Sthlm sexual assaults

=== United Kingdom ===
- Amberdale children's home
- Aylesbury child sex abuse ring
- Banbury child sex abuse ring
- Beechwood children's home
- Berkhamsted paedophile network
- Birmingham bathing cult
- Bristol child sex abuse ring
- Caldicott School
- Derby child sex abuse ring
- Halifax child sex abuse ring
- Huddersfield child sex abuse ring
- Jersey child abuse investigation
- Keighley child sex abuse ring
- Kesgrave Hall School
- Kidwelly sex cult
- Kincora Boys' Home
- Manchester child sex abuse ring
- Medomsley Detention Centre
- Newcastle sex abuse ring
- North Wales child abuse scandal
- Northern Ireland Historical Institutional Abuse Inquiry
- Norwich sexual abuse ring
- Oldham sex abuse
- Operation Doublet
- Operation Voicer
- Oxford child sex abuse ring
- Peterborough sex abuse case
- Plymouth child abuse case
- Rochdale child sex abuse ring
- Rotherham child sexual exploitation scandal
- Sexual abuse scandal in the English Benedictine Congregation
- Telford child sexual exploitation scandal

Cases of sexual abuse within groups include:

- BBC sexual abuse cases
- United Kingdom football sexual abuse scandal

== East Asia ==
=== China ===
- Nanking Massacre
- Persecution of Uyghurs in China#Organized mass rape and sexual torture
- Prison rape#China

=== Japan ===
- 1995 Okinawa rape incident
- Rape during the occupation of Japan
- Aum Shinrikyo

=== South Korea ===
- Miryang gang rape
- Nth Room Case

=== Vietnam ===
- Rape during the Vietnam War
- Lai Đại Hàn
- My Lai Massacre

== Central and South America ==
- Bolivian Mennonite gas-facilitated rapes
- Catholic sexual abuse cases in Latin America
- Sexual violence in Haiti
- Sexual abuse scandal in Haiti
- Haitian conflict#Crimes against civilians
- 1998 Santa Lucía Cotzumalguapa attack

== Middle East ==
- Prison rape#Middle East

=== Israel ===
- Sexual and gender-based violence in the 7 October attack on Israel
- Sexual and gender-based violence against Palestinians during the Israel–Hamas war
- Sde Teiman detention camp#Sexual abuse and rape
- Sde Teiman gang rape

=== Iraq ===
- Abu Ghraib torture and prisoner abuse
- Mahmudiyah rape and killings
- Sexual violence in the Iraqi insurgency

=== Iran ===
- Prison rape#Iran
- Evin Prison#Allegations of rape and torture

=== Saudi Arabia ===
- Qatif rape case

=== Turkey ===
- Rape during the Armenian genocide
- Prison rape#Turkey

=== Syria ===
- Rape during the Syrian civil war

== North America ==
=== Canada ===
- Catholic sexual abuse cases in Canada
- Residential school system
- Sexual abuse in St. John's archdiocese

=== United States ===
- 2003 United States Air Force Academy sexual assault scandal
- 2010 gang rapes in Cleveland, Texas
- Aberdeen scandal
- Boy Scouts of America sex abuse cases
- Martinsville Seven
- Mormon abuse cases
- NXIVM
- Operation Stormy Nights
- Puerto Rican Day Parade attacks
- Seattle Mardi Gras riot
- Sexual abuse scandal in Bridgeport diocese
- Sexual abuse cases in Brooklyn's Haredi community
- Sexual abuse scandal in Burlington diocese
- Sexual abuse scandal in Hartford archdiocese
- Sexual abuse scandal in Miami archdiocese
- Sexual abuse scandal in Providence diocese
- Sexual abuse scandal in the Catholic archdiocese of Boston
- Sexual abuse scandal in the Catholic archdiocese of Los Angeles
- Sexual abuse scandal in the Catholic diocese of Orange
- Sexual abuse scandal in the Roman Catholic Archdiocese of Philadelphia
- Sexual abuse cases in Southern Baptist churches
- Sexual abuse scandal in Wilmington diocese
- Spur Posse
- Steubenville High School rape case
- Tailhook scandal
- United States Air Force Basic Training scandal
- USA Gymnastics sex abuse scandal

== South Asia ==
- Kasur child sexual abuse scandal
- Rape during the Bangladesh Liberation War
- Rape during the Kashmir conflict
- Sexual violence against Tamils in Sri Lanka
- Rohingya genocide

=== India ===
- 1991 Kunan Poshpora incident
- 1992 Ajmer rape case
- 1992 Bhanwari Devi gang rape
- 2012 Delhi gang rape and murder
- 2012 Guwahati molestation case
- Nadia nun rape case
- 2020 Gargi College molestations
- Shakti Mills gang rape

== International ==
- Child sexual abuse by UN peacekeepers
- Comfort women
- Commission to Inquire into Child Abuse
- Jeffrey Epstein's sex-trafficking ring
- Sexual abuse scandal in the Congregation of Christian Brothers
- Sexual abuse scandal in the Salesian order
