= Operation Doublet =

2012 British police investigation

- Date: Began 2012
- Location: Rochdale, Greater Manchester, England
- Type: Police investigation
- Perpetrator: Men involved in child sexual exploitation
- Outcome: 19 men jailed for child sexual offences, rape and trafficking.
- Arrests: 65+
- Convicted: 19
- Charges: Sexual activity with a child, rape conspiracy to rape, inciting a child to engage in sexual activity sexual assault trafficking
- Verdict: Guilty
- Convictions: 19 convictions
- Sentence: Varied prison sentences

Operation Doublet is an investigation set up in 2012 by Greater Manchester Police into child sexual exploitation in Rochdale and other areas of Greater Manchester, England. It has resulted in 19 men being jailed for child sexual offences, rape and trafficking.

== Police investigation ==
In March 2013, it was reported that 42 possible victims of crime had been approached as part of the initial inquiry, and that up to 34 further names of possible victims had been passed to the police. However, Rochdale MP Simon Danczuk expressed concern over the slow progress of the inquiry, and questioned whether officers were winning the trust of victims. Assistant Chief Constable Steve Heywood said in May 2013 that about 550 officers were working on Operation Doublet. He said that the investigation was at "an extremely sensitive stage", and that street grooming was the force's top priority, "a bigger priority than gun crime". He said that the investigation was looking at cases in Rochdale dating back to 2003.

== Charges ==
In May 2012, nine men were arrested on suspicion of sexual activity with a child; the men were not thought to have known each other. In March 2015, a tenth man was arrested for offences relating to two victims aged 13 and 14. In March 2015, the ten men aged between 26 and 45 were charged with serious sex offences against a total of seven females who were aged between 13 and 23 at the time of the offences. The offences took place in Rochdale between 2005 and 2013, and included rape, conspiracy to rape, inciting a child to engage in sexual activity, sexual activity with a child, and sexual assault. Ian Wiggett, the assistant chief constable of Greater Manchester Police said that, thus far, 65 people had been arrested as part of Operation Doublet. He said: "This is an extremely complex and challenging investigation which... will continue over the coming months and further arrests are anticipated."

Four more men were jailed in September 2016 with a further five in February 2017.

== Sentences ==
Initially, ten men were sentenced to jail:

- Afraz Ahmed (33), guilty of 12 counts, 25 years in prison.
- Choudhry Ikhalaq Hussain (38), guilty of 6 counts, 19 years in prison. Fled to and arrested in Pakistan via a joint operation of UK and Pakistan police.
- Rehan Ali (27), guilty of 4 counts, 7 years in prison.
- Kutab Miah (35), 4 counts, 9 years in prison.
- Mohammed Dauood (38), 6 counts, 16 years in prison.
- Abid Khan (39), 4 counts, 6.5 years in prison.
- Mohammed Zahid (55), 1 count, 5 years in prison.
- David Law (46), 2 counts, 11 years in prison.
- A man who cannot be named for legal reasons, 6 counts, 23 years in prison plus 8 years on extended licence.
- Mahfuz Rahman (29), 3 counts, 5.5 years in prison.

The convictions related to eight victims who were aged from 13 to 23 at the time of the offences.

An additional four men were sentenced to jail in 2016:

- Mohammed Ishaque (56), 1 count, 11 years in prison
- Gul Zaman (44), 2 counts, 10 years in prison
- Irshad Wani (39), 8 counts, 9 years in prison
- Shohaib Shabbir (28), 2 counts, 7 years in prison

The convictions relate to offences committed against two victims who were aged between 15 and 16 at the time of the abuse.

Five men were sentenced to jail in 2017:

- Joshim Miah (32), 1 count, 7 years in prison
- Ittefaq Yousaf (26), 2 counts, 20 months in prison
- Mohammed Sadeer (28), 1 count, 16 years in prison
- Ashafaq Yousaf (31), 4 counts, 19 years in prison
- Mohammed Miah (41), 1 count, 16 years in prison

The convictions relate to three victims who were aged between 14 and 16 at the time of the abuse.

== See also ==
- List of sexual abuses perpetrated by groups
- Rochdale sex trafficking gang
