= Three Girls (TV series) =

- Genre: True crime
- Written by: Nicole Taylor
- Directed by: Philippa Lowthorpe
- Starring: Maxine Peake; Lesley Sharp; Molly Windsor; Ria Zmitrowicz; Liv Hill; Ace Bhatti; Paul Kaye; Jill Halfpenny; Bo Bragason; Lisa Riley
- Composer: Natalie Holt
- Country of origin: United Kingdom
- Original language: English
- No. of series: 1
- No. of episodes: 3

Production
- Executive producers: Lucy Richer; Hilary Salmon; Susan Hogg
- Producer: Simon Lewis
- Cinematography: Matt Gray BSC
- Editor: Úna Ní Dhonghaíle
- Running time: 60 minutes
- Production companies: BBC Studios; Studio Lambert

Original release
- Network: BBC One
- Release: 16 May – 18 May 2017

Three Girls is a three-part British television drama series written by Nicole Taylor and directed by Philippa Lowthorpe. It was broadcast on three consecutive nights between 16 and 18 May 2017 on BBC One. A co-production between BBC Studios and Studio Lambert, the series is a dramatised version of the events surrounding the Rochdale child sex abuse ring, and describes how the police and the local authorities failed to investigate allegations of child abuse and rape because the victims were perceived as unreliable witnesses and through fear of being accused of racism because of the ethnicity of the perpetrators.

Three Girls drew a strong viewing audience upon its first broadcast, with 8.24 million viewers for episode one, 7.88 million for episode two and 8.19 million for episode three. The series was released on DVD in Region 2 on 8 January 2018.

A BBC documentary on the case, The Betrayed Girls, was broadcast on 3 July 2017 as a follow-up to the drama.

== Plot ==
The story is told from the viewpoint of three of the victims: fourteen-year-old Holly Winshaw, sixteen-year-old Amber Bowen and her younger sister Ruby. The focus later shifts to sexual health worker Sara Rowbotham, the main whistleblower who drew attention to the case after repeated pleas for action from social services and the police fell on deaf ears.

DC Margaret Oliver, the lead investigator on the case, manages to gain the support of her superior officer, Sandy Guthrie to instigate a full-blown investigation. However, despite significant evidence, the CPS decides to drop the case because of an “unrealistic prospect of conviction”. After Margaret convinces Amber Bowen to testify against her former boyfriend, Tariq, the case is re-opened by recently appointed public prosecutor Nazir Afzal, who with the assistance of the police and the victims involved, manages to secure convictions against ten men involved in the ring.

Rowbotham, Oliver and Afzal all acted as consultants on the series.

== Cast ==
- Maxine Peake as Sara Rowbotham
- Lesley Sharp as DC Margaret Oliver
- Molly Windsor as Holly Winshaw
- Ria Zmitrowicz as Amber Bowen
- Liv Hill as Ruby Bowen
- Ace Bhatti as Nazir Afzal
- Paul Kaye as Jim Winshaw
- Jill Halfpenny as Julie Winshaw
- Bo Bragason as Rachel Winshaw
- Lisa Riley as Lorna Bowen
- Naomi Radcliffe as Yvonne
- Jason Hughes as DC Sandy Guthrie
- Rupert Procter as DC Jack Harrop
- Ross Anderson as PC Richard Bryan
- Antonio Aakeel as Immy
- Wasim Zakir as Tariq
- Zee Sulleyman as Billy
- Simon Nagra as Daddy

== Episodes ==
No.	Title	Directed by	Written by	Original release date	Viewers (millions)
1	"Episode 1"	Philippa Lowthorpe	Nicole Taylor	16 May 2017	8.24
2	"Episode 2"	Philippa Lowthorpe	Nicole Taylor	17 May 2017	7.88
3	"Episode 3"	Philippa Lowthorpe	Nicole Taylor	18 May 2017	8.19

== Filming ==
The three part drama was filmed from June to August 2016 in Bristol and released from 16th to 18th May 2017. As for filming locations, the council offices on Temple Street doubled as Liverpool Crown Court, whilst Bristol Register Office was used for interior community meeting scenes. Filming also took place in Victoria Park, Eastville Park and streets in Hartcliffe, Knowle, Easton, Bedminster and Redcliffe.

== Link to Finsbury Park attack ==
In June 2017, a terrorist attack was launched against mosque-goers in Finsbury Park. The attacker, Darren Osborne, used a van to run over Muslim pedestrians, killing one man and injuring several others. In the course of the trial, it was remarked that Osborne developed an obsession with Muslims after watching Three Girls.

== Reception ==
=== Accolades ===
Year	Award	Category	Nominee(s)	Result	Ref.
2017	WFTV Awards	The Deluxe Director Award	Philippa Lowthorpe	Won	
2017	Festival de la Fiction TV Awards	Jury Special Prize for European Fiction	Three Girls	Won	
2017	Royal Television Society Craft & Design Awards	Director - Drama	Philippa Lowthorpe	Nominated	
2017	Royal Television Society Craft & Design Awards	Editing - Drama	Úna Ní Dhonghaíle	Won	
2017	Royal Television Society Craft & Design Awards	Music - Original Score	Natalie Holt	Nominated	
2017	Royal Television Society Craft & Design Awards	Photography - Drama & Comedy	Matt Gray	Won	
2018	British Academy Television Awards	Best Mini-Series	Three Girls	Won	
2018	British Academy Television Awards	Best Actress	Molly Windsor	Won	
2018	British Academy Television Awards	Best Supporting Actress	Liv Hill	Nominated	
2018	British Academy Television Craft Awards	Best Director: Fiction	Philippa Lowthorpe	Won	
2018	British Academy Television Craft Awards	Best Writer: Drama	Nicole Tyler	Won	
2018	British Academy Television Craft Awards	Best Editing: Fiction	Úna Ní Dhonghaíle	Won	
2018	Irish Film & Television Awards	Editing	Úna Ní Dhonghaíle	Won	
2018	RTS Programme Awards - West of England	Best Television Drama	Three Girls	Won	
2018	RTS Programme Awards - West of England	Best Director Drama	Philippa Lowthorpe	Won	
2018	Royal Television Society Programme Awards	Mini-Series	Three Girls	Won	
2018	Royal Television Society Programme Awards	Writer Award - Drama	Nicole Taylor	Won	
2018	Royal Television Society Programme Awards	Breakthrough Award - On Screen	Molly Windsor	Nominated	
2018	Broadcasting Press Guild	Best Single Drama/Mini-series	Three Girls	Won	
2018	UK Broadcast Awards	Best Drama Series or Serial	Three Girls	Won	

== See also ==
- Post-assault treatment of sexual assault victims
