= Sara Rowbotham =

Helped expose the Rochdale child sex abuse ring

Sara Louise Rowbotham is a British community leader and former health worker in Rochdale, Greater Manchester, notable for helping to expose the child sex abuse ring there. She was a local councillor and served as Deputy leader of Rochdale Borough Council from 2018, and was first elected to represent North Middleton in 2015. She was also the Cabinet Member for Health and Wellbeing. She is a member of the Labour Party.

== Biography ==
Rowbotham was born in Middleton, Greater Manchester. Both her parents were socialists.

Between 2004 and 2014, she worked for the Rochdale Crisis Intervention Team for the NHS, which is when she uncovered the Rochdale child sex abuse ring and helped bring the perpetrators to court. As a front line sexual health worker, who led the NHS crisis team, she made 181 referrals detailing the abuse and sexual grooming of young people between 2005 and 2011. In 2012, she told the Rochdale inquiry her bosses had ignored scores of warnings that girls were being groomed and sexually exploited. She was made redundant two years later, in 2014. Following the screening of Three Girls in mid-May 2017, a petition was started at Change.org calling for her to be formally recognised for her services to Rochdale community. By late May, it had gathered more than 275,000 signatures.

In May 2017, she featured on an episode of First Dates. She received a Special Recognition at the 2018 NHS Heroes Awards, and was made an honorary member of the Council of the National Society for the Prevention of Cruelty to Children (NSPCC) in October 2018.

In the 2021 Queen's Birthday Honours, she was appointed Member of the Order of the British Empire (MBE) "for services to young people".

== In media ==
She was portrayed in Three Girls, a BBC mini-series about the Rochdale child sex abuse ring, by actress Maxine Peake.
