= Sexual abuse scandal in the Roman Catholic Diocese of Burlington =

Roman Catholic Church sexual abuse scandal

The sexual abuse scandal in Burlington diocese is a significant episode in the series of Catholic sex abuse cases in the United States. The court-documented cases covered abuse in the 1970s. The courts heard these cases from 2005 through 2010. In 2010, 26 cases remaining were settled for $17.6 million.

== State investigations ==
=== Sexual abuse investigation ===
In early 2002, Vermont Attorney General William Sorrell launched an investigation into sexual abuse claims against Catholic clergy in the diocese. The diocese in May 2002 turned over its folders on six active priests facing allegations.

=== St. Joseph Orphanage ===
From 1854 to 1974, the Diocese of Burlington and the Sisters of Providence operated St. Joseph Orphanage in Burlington. In 2018, BuzzFeed News published a lengthy article detailings allegations of child abuse at the orphanage over several decades. The article also claimed that murders had taken place there. In response, Vermont Attorney General Charity Clark, in conjunction with the City or Burlington and other agencies, initiated an investigation of the facility.

The task force found:

- No evidence that any murders were committed at St. Joseph
- Extensive evidence of neglect, physical and emotional abuse at St. Joseph
- Multiple allegations of sexual abuse by priests, religious brothers and nuns

Due to the Vermont statute of limitations, any of the criminal acts committed at St. Joseph could not be prosecuted.

== Actions by diocese ==
The Diocese of Burlington in 1996 created a Sexual Misconduct Policy, and a review board for its enforcement in 1996. It updated the policy in 2003. At a news conference in March 2005, Angell described the sexual abuse scandals as the most difficult challenge he faced during his time as bishop.

In August 2019, Bishop Christopher Coyne released a list of clergy with credible accusations of sexual abuse. Coyne in March 2023 testified before the Vermont General Assembly opposing a bill that would require priests to report child abuse crimes that were disclosed in confession or spiritual counseling sessions to police. In September 2024, the diocese filed for Chapter 11 Bankruptcy Protection as it was facing 31 more sexual abuse lawsuits.

== Prominent civil suits ==
=== Alfred Willis ===
During the late 1970s, the parents of 13-year-old Robert Douglas II complained to the diocese that their son had been sexually abused by Alfred Willis, then a pastor at St. Ann Parish in Milton. What the Douglases did not know was that Willis had previously abused boys at St. Anthony's Parish in Burlington and St. Augustine Parish in Montpelier. After getting complaints from those parishes, Bishop John Marshall sent Willis to counseling and then assigned him to St. Ann. Marshall never advised anyone at St. Ann about Willis' history. In 1980, after hearing allegations of sexual abuse from other families at St. Ann, Marshall sent Willis to the Servants of the Paraclete treatment center in Jemez Springs, New Mexico. He was never returned to active ministry.

Robert Douglas sued the diocese in 2004 and received a $170,000 financial settlement.

=== Edward Paquette Jr. ===
In 1972, Bishop John Marshall of Burlington accepted Paquette, a priest from the Diocese of Fall River, into the Diocese of Burlington. The Diocese of Fall River did not mention that Fall River Police in 1963 had found Paquette in a parked car with a teenage boy. He was arrested, but released at the station house to a diocesan official. The Diocese of Fall River removed him from ministry in 1964 and sent him for psychiatric treatment. Marshall did receive a warning from Bishop Leo Aloysius Pursley of the Diocese of Fort Wayne, where Paquette served from 1964 until 1971. Paquette had abused children in that diocese until he was sent away for psychiatric treatment in 1971. Marshall hired Paquette anyway and assigned him to a parish in Rutland.

The diocese in 1974 sent Paquette for treatment at the House of Affirmation in Whitinsville, Massachusetts, after he was accused of molesting two boys in Rutland. After finishing his treatment, Marshall overcame his doubts about Paquette and assigned him to St. Augustine Parish in Montpelier. He was reassigned in 1976 to Christ the King Parish in Burlington. In 1978, Marshall permanently suspended Paquette from ministry after receiving complaints from parents at Christ the King.

By 2002, the Diocese of Burlington was facing 19 lawsuits regarding abuse by Paquette of individuals from Rutland, Burlington and Montpelier in Vermont. In October 2003, a Massachusetts man sued the diocese, claiming that Paquette sexually assaulted him in the 1970s when he was at Christ the King. The diocese was sued again by Percy Babel around 2007. The trial included testimony that Paquette would feel the genitals of boys while roughhousing with them. The plaintiff said that Paquette molested him between 40 and 100 time during a three-year period. A jury in May 2008 awarded Babel $10,266,000.

The diocese in July 2008 settled an abuse case with a man who had been abused by Paquette while he was at St. Augustine Parish in Montpelier. An August 2008 suit ended in a hung jury. In December 2008, Bishop Salvatore Matano attended the civil trial brought by David Navari against the diocese. The jury awarded him $2.2 million. By 2010, the diocese had settled six lawsuits involving Paquette and was facing 18 more claims combined into one lawsuit.

== Sexual abuse convictions ==
=== Stephen J. Nichols ===
In September 2009, Nichols, the pastor at St. Elizabeth Parish in Lyndonville and Our Lady Queen of Peace Church in Danville, was charged with lewd and lascivious conduct. His victim was an 18-year-old man whom Nichols befriended in 2003. In 2005, after a night of heavy drinking, Nichols fondled the boy and asked if he wanted to participate in a sex act. The diocese was alerted to this crime by another individual and immediately report it to the police. In April 2007, Nichols pleaded guilty to a misdemeanor count of engaging in a lewd act and was sentenced to 30 days in jail and sex counseling.

== Analysis of clergy records ==
In May 2009, psychotherapist Richard Sipe analyzed the records of 102 clergy from the Diocese of Burlington between 1950 and 2002. Sipe arrived at these conclusions:

- Twenty-three priests were sexually involved with children under age 13. Sixteen of them only abused boys, three abused both boys and girls and one only abused girls.
- Of those who abused teenagers, 27 of 29 priests abused males alone.
- Forty-four priests were heterosexual, 49 priests had a homosexual orientation, and six were deemed bisexual.
