= Bristol child sex abuse ring =

Large group of men who committed serious sexual offences

The Bristol child sex abuse ring was a group of 13 men who committed sexual offences against underage teenage girls in Bristol, in Southwestern England aged 13 to 15. In November 2014 and November 2016, they were convicted of offences including rape, paying a child for sex, causing or inciting child prostitution, sexual acts with children and sex trafficking.

== Crimes ==
The men of the child sex ring abused and prostituted their victims across Bristol, using hotels, private houses, parks and public toilets. Some were drug-dealers selling heroin and cocaine, while others were described as "well-educated men with good prospects". As in similar sex-abuse cases in other parts of Britain, their victims were typically "vulnerable girls" who were supposedly under local authority care. The gang coerced the girls into sex with small payments of money, gifts of drugs and alcohol, and by persuading them that having sex with many men was part of "Somali 'culture and tradition'".

In a police interview, Said Zakaria referred to two thirteen-year-old victims of one incident of abuse as "dirty slags" who knew that their function was to "suck dick and then fuck off". He had trafficked a "small 13-year-old girl" to a "sex party" in a hotel room in Bristol, where he raped her twice in what the trial judge, Julian Lambert, described as a "rough, callous and very nasty manner" and using "significant" force. Zakaria left the girl "totally humiliated and bleeding". The girl was then raped again by Jusuf Abdirazak, whom the judge described as acting "without humanity and with no pity whatsoever".

== Perpetrators ==
A total of thirteen men were convicted, their names, convictions and sentences are listed below.

Perpetrator	Conviction	Sentence
Liban "Leftback" Abdi aged 21	Paying for sexual services of a child, admitted supplying cocaine and heroin, admitted a separate charge of assault occasioning actual bodily harm to a prison officer.	13 years and 8 months
Mustapha "Greens" Farah aged 20	Paying for sexual services of a child, admitted supplying her with heroin and cocaine.	13 years
Arafat "Left Eye" Osman aged 20	Paying for sexual services of a child, admitted supplying her with heroin and cocaine.	13 years
Idleh "Sniper" Osman aged 21	Facilitating child prostitution, admitted supplying heroin and cocaine.	10 years
Abdulahi "Trigger" Aden aged 20	Rape, possession of indecent pictures of a child, supplying heroin and cocaine.	13 years
Mustafa Deria aged 22	Rape	7 years and 6 months
Said "Target" Zakaria	Rape, supplying heroin and cocaine	11+5 years
Mohamed "Deeq" Jumale	Rape, sexual activity with a child, aiding and abetting Omar Jumale in sexual activity with a child.	10 years
Jusuf "Starns" Abdirizak	Rape	7.5 years
Sakariah "Zac" Sheik	Rape	4 years
Abdirashid "Abs" Abdulahi	Rape	4 years
Omar Jumale	Sexual activity with a child	2 years
Mohamed "Kamal" Dahir	Child prostitution	2 years

== Reaction in Bristol ==
The Guardian reported that the case had caused "huge concern" in Bristol and sent "shockwaves" through the close-knit Somali community there. Muna Abdi, chair of the Bristol Somali Forum, said that the offences were "evil acts ... utterly condemned" by the community. Hugh Sherriffe, regional director for the children's charity Barnardo's, said the case was the "tip of the iceberg" and that similar sexual abuse was still taking place in Bristol and across the rest of the country. Police in Bristol have active investigations under way into similar sex crimes committed by "49 other suspects" of "various communities and ethnic backgrounds".

Responding to the convictions, a local headteacher wrote in The Guardian's dedicated education section of how "schools can't cope with the tide of child sexual exploitation". The headteacher expressed dismay at the way in which the perceived ethnicity of the offenders had harmed race relations in Bristol and described how it had been necessary to devote the month before the verdict to "redoubling our focus on combating racism". The headteacher noted how already "struggling" communities had been further demoralised by a "case on this scale" and spoke of feeling "dread" at "what else is out there".

== See also ==
- List of sexual abuses perpetrated by groups
- Rotherham child sexual exploitation scandal
