= Jayne Senior =

British youth worker

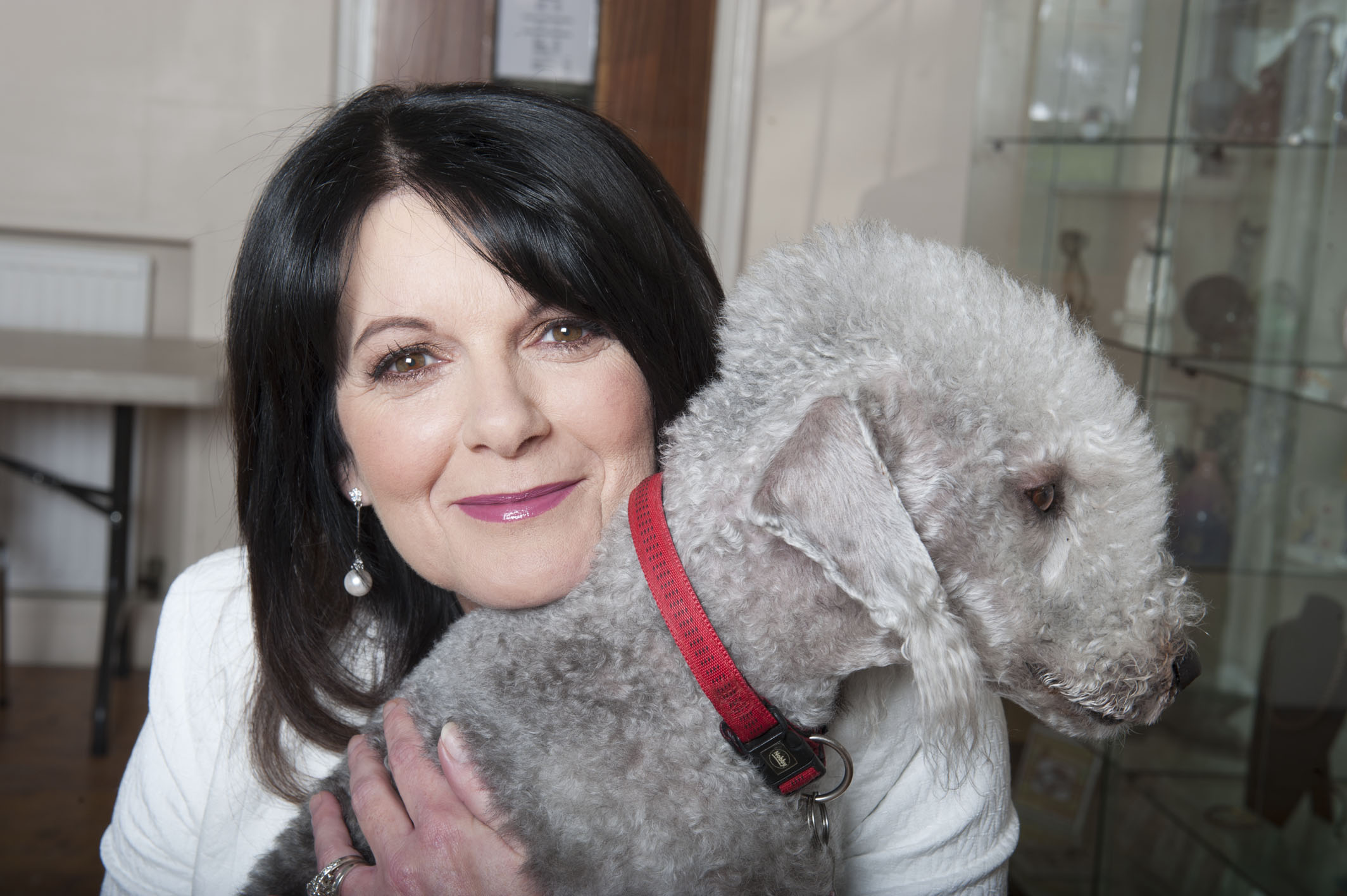
Jayne Senior, 2017

Jayne Senior is a British youth worker and manager of the Swinton Lock Activity Centre near Mexborough in South Yorkshire, England.

Senior is a former manager of Risky Business in Rotherham, a youth project set up in 1997 by Rotherham Council to work with girls and young women at risk of sexual exploitation.

Working for over a decade to expose the issue of child sexual exploitation within Rotherham, Senior's efforts included acting as a whistleblower for a series of articles in The Times about the council's apparent attempts to cover up the abuse. The articles triggered a public inquiry by Alexis Jay, an inspection of the council by Louise Casey, the subsequent replacement of the councillors by government-appointed commissioners, and several criminal inquiries. She had been met with "indifference and scorn".

Senior was awarded an MBE in the 2016 Birthday Honours. She is the author of Broken and Betrayed: The true story of the Rotherham abuse scandal by the woman who fought to expose it (2016).
