= Halifax child sex abuse ring =

Child abuse ring in West Yorkshire, England

The Halifax child sex abuse ring was a group of men who committed serious sexual offences against under-aged girls in the English town of Halifax and city of Bradford, West Yorkshire. It was the largest child sexual exploitation investigation in the United Kingdom. In 2016, the perpetrators were found guilty of rape and other crimes in several separate trials at Leeds Crown Court. In total, as many as a hundred men may have been involved in child abuse. Twenty-five suspects were charged by West Yorkshire Police and the Crown Prosecution Service and 18 of these were found guilty, totalling over 175 years of prison time. A further nine men were convicted in February 2019 for grooming two underage girls in Bradford and sentenced to over 130 years in prison. The majority of those charged and later convicted come from the town's Asian community.

In December 2017, Quilliam released a report entitled "Group Based Child Sexual Exploitation – Dissecting Grooming Gangs", concluding that 84% of offenders were of Asian heritage. This review was criticised for its poor methodology by Ella Cockbain and Waqas Tufail, in their paper "Failing victims, fuelling hate: challenging the harms of the 'Muslim grooming gangs' narrative" which was published in January 2020. In December that year, a further report by the Home Office was released, showing that the majority of CSE gangs were, in fact, composed of white men. However it was also found that some studies suggest an over-representation of Black and Asian offenders relative to the demographics of national populations. The Home Office report also conceded that ethnicity data on grooming gangs was unreliable. In cases like the Halifax child sex abuse ring or other high-profile ones like the Huddersfield grooming gang or the Rochdale child sex abuse ring all or almost all of those convicted were British Asian men.

Writing in The Guardian, Cockbain and Tufail wrote of the report that "The two-year study by the Home Office makes very clear that there are no grounds for asserting that Muslim or Pakistani-heritage men are disproportionately engaged in such crimes, and, citing our research, it confirmed the unreliability of the Quilliam claim".

== Crimes ==
The principal victim was identified as "Jeanette" in government reports. The prosecution said that the girl, who was 13 when the abuse first began, came from a troubled family background and was “lonely [and] needy”. The gang exploited her desire for friendship and love, deliberately giving her drink and drugs to turn her into an addict and make her more easily controlled. In interviews with the police, she described being raped and abused in many different locations, including private homes in Halifax, Bradford and Manchester, and hotels in Bradford, Leeds and London. The abuse took place between 2006 and 2011.

"Jeanette" believed that she was abused by at least a hundred men, often more than once a day and once by nineteen men over a short time. She was infected with gonorrhoea as result of the abuse and suffered permanent psychological harm. Although she knew many of the men only by their nicknames, the police were able to identify them using CCTV footage from the hotels in which she was abused and by analysing male DNA in stains found on her clothing.

Police said it was the largest child sexual exploitation investigation in the country – "bigger than high profile cases in Rochdale and Rotherham."

=== Calderdale board report and West Yorkshire police apology ===
The November 2016 board report found that three agencies failed to protect "Jeanette". West Yorkshire police apologized, saying "We would firstly like to apologise to the victim for the failings of West Yorkshire police."

== Legal ==
The gang members were arrested in May 2013. There were three separate trials in the first half of 2016. Thirteen men received prison sentences adding up to over 150 years.

=== Judge's comments ===
Judge Geoffrey Marson QC harshly criticised the guilty men for committing gross abuse on obviously vulnerable girls. He condemned them for not showing “the slightest remorse” for their behaviour and for the way in which they had inflicted pain, humiliation and degradation on a victim whom they had deliberately incapacitated with drink and drugs. He said that they had inflicted permanent psychological harm on the girl, acting without concern or feelings for anything but their own sexual gratification.

=== 2018 arrests for same case ===
In early January 2018, 20 additional men were arrested as a result of investigations into the same case.

== Verdicts and sentences ==
Those found guilty in June 2016 and their sentences were as follows:

Forename	Surname	Age	Of	Charges
Hedar	Ali	36	Bradford	25 years for rape and trafficking for sexual exploitation
Haider	Ali	41	Halifax	20 years for sexual activity with a child and causing a person to engage in sexual activity
Khalid	Zaman	38	Bradford	17 and a half years for rape and supplying class B drugs
Mohammed	Ramzan	35	Bradford	15 years for rape
Haaris	Ahmed	32	Halifax	12 and a half years for sexual activity with a child and supplying class B drugs
Tahir	Mahmood	43	Halifax	11 years for sexual activity with a child and sexual assault
Taukeer	Butt	31	Halifax	10 years for sexual activity with a child
Amaar Ali	Ditta	27	Halifax	9 years for sexual activity with a child
Azeem	Subhani	25	Halifax	9 years for sexual activity with a child
Talib	Saddiq	31	Halifax	8 years for sexual activity with a child
Sikander	Malik	31	Halifax	7 years for sexual activity with a child
Mohammed Ali	Ahmed	43	Halifax	6 and a half years for sexual activity with a child
Aftab	Hussain	37	Halifax	6 years for sexual activity with a child
Mansoor	Akhtar	25	Huddersfield	6 years for sexual activity with a child and supplying Class B drugs
Sikander	Ishaq	31	Halifax	6 years for sexual activity with a child
Furqaan	Ghafar	31	Derby	5 years and three months after he admitted one charge of sexual activity with a child.
Aesan	Pervez	27	Halifax	4 years. Convicted by a jury after a trial at Leeds Crown Court on one charge of sexual assault on the girl

An 18th member of the ring was jailed for 10 months for supplying class B drugs

Those found guilty in February 2019 and their sentences were as follows:

Forename	Surname	Age	Of	Charges
Saeed	Akhtar	55	Bradford	20 years for two counts of inciting child prostitution and rape
Basharat	Khaliq	38	Bradford	20 years for five counts of rape and assault by penetration
Parvaze	Ahmed	36	Bradford	17 years for three counts of rape
Naveed	Akhtar	43	Bradford	17 years for two counts of rape
Kieran	Harris	28	Dewsbury	17 years for two counts of rape
Mohammed	Usman	31	Bradford	17 years for two counts of rape
Izar	Hussain	32	Bradford	16 years for rape and attempted rape
Faheem	Iqbal	27	No fixed abode	7 years for aiding and abetting rape
Zeeshan	Ali	32	Bradford	18 months for sexual assault

== See also ==
- Child sexual abuse in the United Kingdom
- List of sexual abuses perpetrated by groups
