= Quedlinburg child sex abuse ring =

Sex abuse incident

The Quedlinburg child sex abuse ring was a group of two men and one woman who were accused of sexual offences against two female children in the German city of Quedlinburg.

Sometime in late April or early May 2011, the woman and the two men from Quedlinburg met at the edge of a forest in the Harz Mountains. The woman from Quedlinburg handed over her then-10-year-old daughter and her 15-year-old sister to the two men. They drove on to Wernigerode, to the "Burgbreite" prefabricated housing estate. This estate was let them by a third man, who was waiting for them in one of the concrete blocks on the main street. The perpetrators made full confessions before the Leipzig Regional Court.

The woman was 35 years old and the men were 38 and 66 years old. The 66-year-old man had been imprisoned for sexually abusing a child between 2004 and 2010. The woman received 800 euros in cash from the younger man. The victims also received some money and cigarettes. Both clients stated that they had not threatened the girls.

The woman was sentenced to four years and nine months in prison.
