= Banbury child sex abuse ring =

British child sex abuse group

The Banbury child sex abuse ring was a group of six men who committed serious sexual offences against under-aged girls in the English town of Banbury, Oxfordshire. In March 2015, they were found guilty of offences including rape and sexual activity with a child over a period extending from 2009 to 2014. Police in Banbury had drawn on the lessons of Operation Bullfinch, which targeted sexual abuse in nearby Oxford.

== Crimes ==
The men targeted vulnerable girls using social media to organize parties at which the girls were groomed. The men used gifts and apparent displays of affection towards the girls, winning their trust before initiating abusive sexual relationships. Offences took place in cars, woods and in the men's private homes. Charges concerning seven victims aged from 13 to 15 were included in the prosecution case. The offences were rape, sexual activity with a child and inciting a child to engage in sexual activity.

== Offenders ==
The six men were named as:

Name	Age	Charges
Ahmed Hassan-Sule	21	Found guilty of 13 counts of sexual activity with a child and one count of assault by penetration
Mohamed Saleh	22	Found guilty of two counts of sexual activity with a child
Said Saleh	20	Found guilty of one count of sexual activity with a child
Kagiso Manase	21	Found guilty of three counts of sexual activity with a child, two counts of inciting a child to engage in sexual activity and one count of sexual assault
Takudzwa Hova	21	Found guilty of one count of rape, one count of sexual activity with a child and two counts of causing or inciting a child to engage in sexual activity
Zsolt Szaltoni	18	Found guilty of one charge of rape

One man was acquitted of all charges in court.

In March 2017 several others were arrested in connection with raping young girls.

== Reaction in Banbury and Parliament ==
Detective Inspector Steve Raffield of Banbury police was quoted as saying that the offenders "abused the trust of the vulnerable young victims for the purpose of their own sexual gratification". He described the offences as "horrific" crimes that would "have a lasting impact upon the victims’ lives." He condemned the offenders for pleading not guilty and forcing the victims "to relive their experiences by giving evidence in court." He concluded by thanking the victims for the courage they showed in giving evidence, which had helped secure convictions of the accused men.

The Banbury MP Sir Tony Baldry was disturbed by tactics used by the defence during the trial, writing to the Lord Chancellor to express his concern at reference to the victims as willing participants who were falsely claiming abuse because "it is better to be a victim than a slag". Defence counsel also alleged the case had been "manufactured" by the police and that the victims had been "brain-washed by social workers".

== See also ==
- List of sexual abuses perpetrated by groups
