= Derby child sex abuse ring =

Criminal group in Duffield, England

The Derby child sex abuse ring was a group of men who sexually abused up to a hundred girls in Derby, England. In 2010, after an undercover investigation by Derbyshire police, members of the ring were charged with 75 offences relating to 26 girls. Nine of the 13 accused were convicted of grooming and raping girls between 12 and 18 years old. The attacks provoked fierce discussion about race and sexual exploitation.

== Ring leaders ==
The thirteen men lived throughout Derby and the police believed they met through a shared attraction for young girls. The leaders were Abid Mohammed Saddique and Mohammed Romaan Liaqat, both married Muslim men with young children. They would cruise around the streets of Derby targeting young girls. CCTV footage showed the gang leaders making repeated efforts to entice a pair of girls standing by the side of the road into their car. The police later discovered vodka and plastic cups under the car seats. Saddique was accused of sexually assaulting a 12-year-old in Darley Park, and Liaqat raped a 14-year-old in their vehicle.

== Abuse ==
The victims, aged between 12 and 18, were predominantly vulnerable girls from troubled backgrounds, and some of them were in care and known to social services. The men would target girls at railway stations, on estates, and walking home from school. The gang would first befriend the girls, inviting them out for a drive or a drink and supplied them with alcohol and drugs. The grooming process was then intensified, the girls were invited to parties, and further meetings were arranged. The girls were then driven to secluded areas and were sexually abused and raped. The abuse took place in houses and hotels across the Midlands, parks and even the victims' own homes. Two victims were threatened with hammers while another was locked up before being raped. Sometimes, up to six men would be involved in the often violent assaults, which the gang would film on their mobile phones. Three gang members were filmed having sex with a 14-year-old girl in a hotel room to the sound of noisy cheering. Some of the girls were locked up to prevent them escaping. A 16-year-old victim stated: "I will never ever understand what has made them so evil and ignorant that still to this day they think they've not done anything wrong."

== Police investigation ==
Derby police were aware of rumours of a paedophile gang operating in the city. On 30 December 2008, Staffordshire police stopped a car on suspicion of shoplifting, carrying three gang members and three young girls. The girls had been reported missing from a care home in Derby. The police drove the girls back to Derby, and during the journey, they told the officers about what had been taking place. Derbyshire police force launched an undercover investigation called Operation Retriever, setting up surveillance and tailing the gang's BMW around Derby. Detectives collected DNA samples from several of the crime scenes. Siddique was wearing an electronic tag after a previous conviction for assaulting a woman.

On 24 April 2009, two distressed teenagers stumbled out of a flat that was under surveillance and said that they had been raped. The police had been unaware of their presence. The victims told the police of other girls who had been assaulted, and the police soon discovered a campaign of systematic grooming and abuse within the city. Detective Inspector of Derbyshire police, Shaun Dawson, said, "When we arrested them, we had no idea of the scale of this. Once we had them locked up other victims spoke out and it snowballed from there." Debbie Platt, who led the police investigation, said she was shocked at the extent of the abuse and said it was like "a campaign of rape against children." The police stated that the abuse could have continued for a lot longer.

== Trial ==
The crown prosecution service charged the gang with 75 charges relating to twenty six girls, ranging from rape to intimidating witnesses, though police believed there were many more victims. The men were charged in three separate trials at Leicester Crown Court.

Name	Conviction
Abid Mohammed Saddique	Rape, sexual assault, sexual activity with a child, perverting the course of justice, aiding and abetting rape, false imprisonment, making indecent images of children
Mohammed Romaan Liaqat	Rape, sexual assault, aiding and abetting rape, affray, sexual activity with a child, making indecent images of children
Akshay Kumar	Making indecent images of children
Faisal Mehmood	Sexual activity with a child
Mohammed Imran Rehman	Rape
Graham Blackham	Breaches of Sexual Offender Prevention Order

Abid Mohammed Saddique was jailed for a minimum of 11 years, and Mohammed Romaan Liaqat for a minimum of 8 years.

Three other men were jailed during the investigation, but for charges of perverting the court of justice and cocaine supply.

== Analysis ==
This case occurred after other incidents in Rochdale, Preston and Rotherham, where Asian gangs, mostly British Pakistani men, had been convicted of child grooming and rape. At the time of the Derby case, 50 out of the 56 men convicted in English courts of on-street grooming of girls were from the British Pakistani community. The significance of the race of the abusers was hotly disputed.

The Derby police avoided drawing conclusions regarding the ethnicity of the group, one officer observing that the sexual offenders register consisted of "mainly white men." Police suggested that there was possibly a willingness for abusers with shared ethnic backgrounds to work together in gangs, and not on their own. The judge in the case agreed that the race of the victims and the abusers was "coincidental" and that the crimes were not racially aggravated.

Former home secretary Jack Straw said that though there were many white sex offenders, there was a "specific problem" in some areas of Pakistani men targeting "vulnerable white girls", whom they perceived as "easy meat" for sexual abuse. He urged the Pakistani community to be "more open" about the abuse. Former MP and women's campaigner Ann Cryer endorsed Straw's comments, saying there was a problem that Muslim MPs were not prepared to confront; that there was a minority of young Asian males that did do not "behave properly towards white women." Atma Singh, from the Sikh Community Action Network, praised Straw for being "honest" about the "pockets of youngsters in the Pakistani community who treat girls from other communities as 'sexual objects'." Children's minister Tim Loughton warned that "closed" Asian communities, "political correctness and racial sensitivities" had affected investigations into child sex grooming by Asian gangs.

Keith Vaz said it was inappropriate to stereotype an entire community and said this was not a cultural problem. Labour MP Khalid Mahmood criticised Straw saying stereotyping and "castigat[ing] a whole community is not becoming of him." He said there were Asian men who would do the same to Muslim and Pakistani girls, taking whatever chance available without discriminating. The chief executive of Barnardo's said that "I certainly don't think it's just a Pakistani thing" and that there was an over-representation of ethnic minority groups in general among perpetrators—"it's not just one nation."

Mohammed Shafiq, the director of the Ramadhan Foundation, said that an abhorrent form of racism in parts of the British Pakistani community fuelled the abuse, and that some young men did not see white girls as equal to their own daughters or sisters. He said that an honest debate was needed in the Asian community to stop the British National Party exploiting these crimes which "Islam totally forbids." Douglas Murray, who was the director of the Centre for Social Cohesion, said that Muslim leaders needed to tackle the attitudes of young Muslim men towards women.

== Reports by CEOP and Office of the Children's Commission ==
After this case, the UK's national centre for child protection—the Child Exploitation and Online Protection Centre (CEOP)—published on 29 June 2011 a report on the findings of a six-month investigation into "on street grooming". The report found that police, social services and charities were failing to properly investigate this issue and that a quarter of offenders reported for child grooming since 2008 were Asian, a disproportionate figure compared to population figures. Peter Davies, the head of CEOP, was quick to clarify that the findings did not provide a national picture because of incomplete data, and cautioned against extrapolating anything from the results. He added that "looking at this issue through the lens of ethnicity does not do the victims any favours." Just previously to the reports publication, the Children's Minister, Tim Loughton, claimed that "a combination of political correctness and racial sensitivities have kept cases of child sex grooming by Asian gangs 'under the radar'."

A more comprehensive, but still interim, report titled "I thought I was the only one. The only one in the world" was published on 20 November 2012 by the Office of the Children's Commission under the chairmanship of the Deputy Children's Commissioner Sue Berelowitz. It recounts how 2,409 children were confirmed as victims of sexual exploitation in gangs and groups during the 14-month period from August 2010 to October 2011. Sikh groups also complained that the report ignored their concerns about Muslim men targeting Sikh girls. However, in September 2013, following the conviction of six Muslims Leicester Crown Court of paying a "vulnerable and damaged" 16-year-old Sikh girl for sex, a BBC Inside Out programme examined several cases of young Sikh women being groomed by Muslim men, with one alleged ex-groomer even admitting that they specifically targeted Sikh girls. Bhai Mohan Singh, who had gathered the evidence which had convicted the six Muslims, was featured in the programme, and claimed he was at that time investigating "19 cases" from "across the UK" where Sikh girls were allegedly being groomed by older Muslim men, but none of these later cases have been pursued.

=== Investigations ===
The Derby case was one of several cases which prompted investigations looking into the claim that "the majority of the perpetrators have been British Pakistani"; the first was by Quilliam in December 2017, which released a report entitled "Group Based Child Sexual Exploitation – Dissecting Grooming Gangs", which claimed 84% of offenders were of South Asian heritage. However, this report was "fiercely" criticised for its unscientific nature and poor methodology by child sexual exploitation experts Ella Cockbain and Waqas Tufail, in their paper "Failing Victims, Fuelling Hate: Challenging the Harms of the 'Muslim grooming gangs' Narrative" which was published in January 2020.

A further investigation was carried out by the British government in December 2020, when the Home Office published their findings, showing that the majority of child sexual exploitation gangs were, in fact, composed of white men and not British Pakistani men. The report did however concede that ethnicity data on childsexual exploitation was not reliable:

Research has found that group-based child sexual exploitation offenders are most commonly white. Some studies suggest an overrepresentation of black and Asian offenders relative to the demographics of national populations. However, it is not possible to conclude that this is representative of all group-based CSE offending.

– Home Office

In 2025, the national audit by Baroness Casey noted that the data of the 2020 Home Office report "does not include sufficient ethnicity data to conclude that the majority of offenders are White", which made the claim made in the 2020 report "hard to understand". The report found there was enough local data from three police forces – Greater Manchester, South Yorkshire and West Yorkshire – to show that disproportionate numbers of Asian men were involved in child sex grooming gangs. The report said that the ethnicity of perpetrators had been "shied away from". however, nationally in two-thirds of cases the ethnicity of the perpetrators was not recorded, which made it impossible to draw conclusions at a national level, or to assess the scale of the issue.

Casey called for a national inquiry, which was endorsed by the Prime Minister Keir Starmer, who announced two days before the report was published that there would be a full national statutory inquiry into grooming gangs.

== See also ==
- List of sexual abuses perpetrated by groups
