= Berkhamsted paedophile network =

English child sex abuse network

In 2016, police discovered a child sex abuse network run from Berkhamsted in Hertfordshire, England. Eight of the men were convicted and some received significant prison sentences.

The discovery resulted in a police investigation in 2017 which helped to uncover many other child abusers worldwide.

== Operation Pendent ==
Operation Pendent was a child sex abuse investigation in 2017 into the Berkhamsted network; it was led by Hertfordshire Constabulary, and helped to uncover many other child abusers worldwide. One suspect in the United States was arrested within 48 hours of information being passed to the U.S. Department of Homeland Security.

== Media restrictions ==
For much of 2017, media reporting on the criminal proceedings members of the network was under reporting restrictions. Restrictions were lifted on 20 December 2017, when six offenders were sentenced. A seventh was jailed in February 2018.

== Sentences ==
Perpetrator	Conviction(s)	Sentence
Michael Emerton (leader)	Rape of a child (4 counts), inciting a child to partake in sexual activity (3 counts), conspiring with others to rape or commit sex acts with or in front of a child	Nine life sentences
Bruce Child	Rape of a child, indecently assaulting a child younger than 16, grooming a 12-year-old child, making indecent photographs of children taken from the internet.	18 years, 6 years concurrently, 3 years
Thomas Perry	Conspiring to rape a child younger than 13, planning sex acts with a child younger than 13, causing a child to witness sexual activity	14 years
Paul Stevens	Conspiracy to rape a child younger than 13, planning sex acts with a child younger than 13	10 years
Matthew Webby	Sexual acts with a child (2 counts), conspiring to rape a child, planning sex acts with a child, possessing indecent images of children	9 years
Robert Lindsay	Conspiring to rape a child, planning sex acts with a child, inciting the sexual exploitation of a child, making indecent photographs of a child	7½ years
Simon Wintle	Sexual activity in front of a child	2½ years
David Overall	Accessing and distributing indecent photographs of children	2 years
