= Oxford child sex abuse ring =

Child sex abuse ring in Oxford, England

- Years active: 1998–2012
- Territory: Oxford, England
- Membership: >22
- Activities: Child sexual abuse

The Oxford child sex abuse ring was a group of 22 men who were convicted of various sexual offences against underage girls in the English city of Oxford between 1998 and 2012. Thames Valley Police launched Operation Bullfinch in May 2011 to investigate allegations of historical sexual abuse, leading to ten men being convicted. Upon further allegations in 2015, Thames Valley Police then launched Operation Silk, resulting in ten more men being convicted and Operation Spur which resulted in two more convictions.

In March 2015, a report revealed that more than 300 children, mostly girls from the city of Oxford, could have been groomed and sexually exploited in the area. It accused the Thames Valley Police, then led by Chief Constable Sara Thornton, of disbelieving the girls and failing to act on repeated calls for help, and Oxfordshire Social Services of failing to protect them despite compelling evidence they were in danger. The report also called for research into why a significant number of perpetrators of child grooming are of "Pakistani and/or Muslim heritage". A Home Office report published in December 2020 concluded that existing evidence did not prove a link between ethnicity and grooming gangs.

== Perpetrators ==
The first seven men included two pairs of brothers with three other men in June 2013. One of the gang was further convicted further in June 2014 along with two other men. Three of the men were further convicted in another trial in January 2019 under another operation named Operation Silk. There were two further groups of men convicted under Operation Silk, eight men in June 2018 and a further two men in February 2020, along with a man who was further convicted. A man was convicted in March 2015 and two cousins convicted in July 2016. Those found guilty include:

Forename	Surname	Age	Of	Charges	Sentences
Kamar	Jamil	27	Summertown, Oxford	Found guilty of five counts of rape, two counts of conspiracy to rape and one count of arranging child prostitution.	12 years
Akhtar	Dogar	32	East Oxford	Found guilty of five counts of rape, three counts of conspiracy to rape, two counts of child prostitution and one count of trafficking.	Life sentence
Anjum	Dogar	31	East Oxford	Found guilty of three counts of rape, two counts of child prostitution, three counts of conspiracy to rape and one count of trafficking.	Life sentence
Assad	Hussain	32	Rose Hill, Oxford	Found guilty of two counts of sexual activity with a child.	7 years
Mohammed	Karrar	38	Cowley	Found guilty of two counts of conspiracy to rape, four counts of rape of a child, one count of using an instrument to procure miscarriage, two counts of trafficking, one count of assault of a child by penetration, two counts of child prostitution, three counts of rape, two counts of conspiracy to rape a child and one count of supplying a class A drug.	Life sentence
Bassam	Karrar	33	Cowley	Found guilty of two counts of rape, one count of rape of a child, two counts of conspiracy to rape a child, two counts of child prostitution, one count of trafficking and one count of conspiracy to rape.	Life sentence
Zeeshan	Ahmed	27	Wood Farm, Oxford	Found guilty of two counts of sexual activity with a child and perverting the court of justice.	1 1/2 years
Bilal	Ahmed	27	Maidenhead	Found guilty of serious sexual assault.	3 1/2 years
Mustafa	Ahmed	26	London	Found guilty of sexual assault.	1 1/2 years
Assad	Hussain	37	Iffley Road, Oxford	Found guilty of five counts of rape and two counts of indecent assault.	Life sentence
Moinul	Islam	42	Wykeham Crescent, Oxford	Found guilty of rape, two counts of indecent assault and supplying cannabis.	15 years
Kameer	Iqbal	39	Dashwood Road, Oxford	Found guilty of guilty of three counts of rape.	12 years
Khalid	Hussain	38	Ashhurst Way, Oxford	Found guilty of rape and indecent assault.	12 years
Alladitta	Yousaf	38	Bodley Road, Oxford	Found guilty of indecent assault.	7 1/2 years
Haji	Khan	38	Littlegreen Lane, Birmingham	Found guilty of conspiracy to rape.	10 years
Kamran	Khan	36	Northfield Road, Bolton	Found guilty of indecent assault and false imprisonment.	8 years
Raheem	Ahmed	40	Starwort Path, Oxford	Found guilty of four counts of indecent assault, false imprisonment and supplying a class B drug.	12 years
Naim	Khan	38	Herschel Crescent, Oxford	Found guilty of eight counts of rape, seven counts of indecent assault and one count of supplying a class B drug.	24 years
Mohammed	Nazir	42	Wood Farm, Oxford	Found guilty of seven counts of rape, eight counts of indecent assault and one count of supplying a class B drug.	20 years
Tilal	Madhi	36	Friars Street, Hereford	Found guilty of two counts of conspiracy to rape a girl under 16, conspiracy to indecently assault a girl under 16, one count of trafficking within the UK for sexual exploitation and one count of arranging or facilitating child prostitution of a child under the age of 18 years.	18 years
Salik	Miah	34	Ferry Hinksey Road, West Oxford	Found guilty of one count of conspiracy to rape, two counts of rape and one count of arranging or facilitating child prostitution.	11 years
Azad	Miah	37	Riverside Court, Oxford	Found guilty of one count of conspiracy to rape, two counts of rape and one count of arranging or facilitating child prostitution.	12 years

== Abuse ==
From 2004 to 2012, the men groomed children from 11-15 years-old from dysfunctional backgrounds who were unlikely to be believed by others living in care homes. They were given presents, plied with alcohol, and introduced to crack cocaine and heroin. After the girls became dependent on the men, they were guarded so they could not escape and threatened that they and their families would be harmed if they tried to leave. The girls were raped vaginally, orally, and anally, sometimes by several men, the abuse occasionally lasting for several days at a time. Some girls were groomed to be prostitutes and taken to guest houses in Bradford, Leeds, London, Slough, and Bournemouth where men paid to have sex with them. The girls were subjected to extreme sexual violence, biting, suffocating, and burning. They were tortured with knives, baseball bats, and meat cleavers and were occasionally urinated upon. One 14-year-old girl was burned with a lighter when she tried to resist having sex. The mother of another girl said that "she had begged social services staff to rescue her [daughter] from the gang", who had "threatened to cut the girl's face off" and "slit the throats" of members of the girl's family.

One girl aged 12 was forced into prostitution. She was abused in various places around Oxford, including a flat, the Nanford Guest House, a Travelodge hotel and in Shotover Woods. She frequently contracted chlamydia and was covered in burns from where men had stubbed out their cigarettes. She began to self-harm and described her experiences as "living hell". She said that the men sometimes seemed to be aroused by her crying.

Mohammed Karrar, the ringleader of the gang was "brazen in his exploitation". According to the Guardian, he "acted in the belief that the authorities would never challenge him—something that for years proved to be true." He branded the buttocks of one under-aged victim with his initial, "M", marking her as his property and charged men between £400 and £600 to have sex with her. Karrar visited the girl at her house where she was a carer for her deaf and ill parents. He performed an illegal abortion on the same girl.

He regularly had sex with her when she was the age of 12. His brother had a parallel relationship with her, although she did not see him as often. Before she reached her teens, she was pregnant. When Mohammed Karrar found out, he was “fucking fuming” with her for allowing it to happen and told her, “You should have been more responsible.” He went into a rage and grabbed her by the throat. Soon after, he gave her drugs and took her to Reading, where a backstreet abortion was performed with a hooked instrument.

A 14-year-old girl was threatened with a gun into having sex with member of the sex ring. She said the gang members were aware she lived in a children's home and that Akhtar Dogar, a gang member, waited around the corner from the children's home in Henley-on-Thames where she lived. She described being transported around flats, guest houses and parks where she was then raped.

== Media reaction ==
The Daily Telegraph reported Dr Taj Hargey, imam of the Oxford Islamic Congregation, as saying that "race and religion were inextricably linked to the recent spate of grooming rings in which Muslim men have targeted under-age white girls":

The view of some Islamic preachers towards white women can be appalling. They encourage their followers to believe that these women are habitually promiscuous, decadent, and sleazy—sins which are made all the worse by the fact that they are kaffurs or non-believers. Their dress code, from miniskirts to sleeveless tops, is deemed to reflect their impure and immoral outlook. According to this mentality, these white women deserve to be punished for their behaviour by being exploited and degraded.

Hargey blames the agencies of the state, including the police, social services and the care system, who ″seemed eager to ignore the sickening exploitation that was happening before their eyes. Terrified of accusations of racism, desperate not to undermine the official creed of cultural diversity, they took no action against obvious abuse."

In the same newspaper, journalist Allison Pearson claimed that "fear of racism" had allowed sex crimes against white girls by Pakistani Muslims to become a serious problem not only in Oxford but throughout the country. She described the Pakistani Muslim community as "essentially a Victorian society that has landed like Doctor Who's Tardis on a liberal, permissive planet it despises". She criticised the views of Sue Berelowitz, the Deputy Children's Commissioner, who has attempted to downplay the over-representation of certain groups in sex-crimes against children. While expressing relief that some action was now being taken against the problem, she concluded that trouble was still in store: "what remains is a political class still far too timid to challenge growing and alarming separatism in Muslim education and law."

In The Independent, commentator Paul Vallely pointed out that there was a danger of the media, fuelled on a toxic mixture of "combination of depravity and self-righteous indignation", peddling vicious stereotypes about Pakistani Muslim culture. He pointed out that these sexual crimes were not confined to Pakistani Muslims or directed purely against white victims: a Turkish Muslim gang in London had targeted a Bangladeshi girl and, in the Rochdale case, one Pakistani Muslim perpetrator had raped a member of his own community. He spotlighted voices from the Muslim community who were interrogating issues around the dysfunction there:

The novelist Bina Shah has criticised a culture of racism, misogyny, tribalism and sexual vulgarity among men "who hail from the poorest, least educated, and most closed-off parts of Pakistan". Julie Siddiqi, the executive director of the Islamic Society of Britain, has called for a change in the male dominance at the top of many Muslim organisations which may have contributed to their community's silence on grooming.

== Sentencing ==
In June 2013 the gang received sentences totalling 95 years for what the presiding judge, Judge Peter Rook, described as "a series of sexual crimes of the utmost depravity". Brothers Mohammed and Bassam Karrar received life sentences, with minimum tariffs of 20 years for Mohammed Karrar and 15 years for Bassam Karrar. Brothers Akhtar and Anjum Dogar received life sentences with minimum tariffs of 17 years. Kamar Jamil received a life sentence with a minimum tariff of 12 years. Assad Hussain and Zeeshan Ahmed were both jailed for seven years. In a further trial involving 3 gang members in 2018, Mohammed Karrar was again found guilty and sentenced to 18 years in 2019, while Bassam Karrar received 10 years and Anjum Dogar received 20 years.

== 2015 report ==
A serious case review of the Oxford sex gang commissioned by Maggie Blyth, independent chair of the Oxfordshire safeguarding children board, was released in March 2015. It reported that as many as 373 children, 50 of them boys, may have been targeted for sex in Oxfordshire in sixteen years. The report criticized Thames Valley Police and Oxfordshire County Council for "many errors" and not acting sooner. Among the failings are a culture of denial among the professionals who blamed girls for precocious and difficult behaviour, blamed girls for putting themselves at risk of harm, tolerated underage sexual activity by girls with older men, and failed to recognize girls had been groomed and violently controlled. The report called for research into why people of "Pakistani and/or Muslim heritage" constituted a significant number of the perpetrators.

The report found no evidence of "wilful professional misconduct" and said that senior managers were not made aware of what was going on, and no one had been disciplined or sacked despite the errors made. The MP for Oxford East, Andrew Smith, called on the government to set up an independent inquiry. Prime Minister David Cameron, speaking at a summit to address the issue after similar scandals in Rotherham and Oxfordshire, made a number of proposals, including up to five years in jail for teachers, councillors, and social workers in England and Wales who failed to protect children, unlimited fines for individuals and organisations shown to have let children down, and a national helpline to enable professionals to report bad practice.

== Other reports ==
In December 2017, Quilliam released a report entitled "Group Based Child Sexual Exploitation – Dissecting Grooming Gangs", concluding that 84% of offenders were of South Asian heritage. This review was criticised for its poor methodology by Ella Cockbain and Waqas Tufail, in their paper "Failing victims, fuelling hate: challenging the harms of the 'Muslim grooming gangs' narrative" which was published in January 2020. In December that year, a further report by the Home Office was released, stating 'seems most likely that the ethnicity of group-based CSE offenders is in line with CSA more generally and with the general population, with the majority of offenders being White', and that it is not possible to conclude that Asian men are disproportionately engaged in such crimes.

In 2025, the national audit by Baroness Casey noted that the data of the 2020 Home Office report "does not include sufficient ethnicity data to conclude that the majority of offenders are White", which made the claim made in the 2020 report "hard to understand". The report found there was enough local data from three police forces – Greater Manchester, South Yorkshire and West Yorkshire – to show that disproportionate numbers of Asian men were involved in child sex grooming gangs. The report said that the ethnicity of perpetrators had been "shied away from". however, nationally in two-thirds of cases the ethnicity of the perpetrators was not recorded, which made it impossible to draw conclusions at a national level, or to assess the scale of the issue.

Casey called for a national inquiry, which was endorsed by the Prime Minister Keir Starmer, who announced two days before the report was published that there would be a full national statutory inquiry into grooming gangs.

== See also ==
- Child sexual abuse in the United Kingdom
- List of sexual abuses perpetrated by groups
