= Aylesbury child sex abuse ring =

Group of 5 men guilty of child sex abuse in 2015

The Aylesbury child sex abuse ring was a group of five men who committed serious sexual offences against two under-aged girls in the English town of Aylesbury, Buckinghamshire. In July 2015, they were found guilty of offences including rape and child prostitution over a period extending from 2006 to 2012. The child protection charity Barnardo's stated that it had worked with the two girls in 2008 and referred one of them to Buckinghamshire County Council as in danger of child sex exploitation. The council did not respond adequately and, following the convictions, apologised to the two girls for its failure to protect them. It has now instituted a serious case review to examine those failures.

== Crimes ==
The gang used gifts of food, alcohol, drugs and DVDs to win the girls' trust before initiating abusive sexual relationships. The girls, referred to in court as Girl A and Girl B, were subsequently trafficked as child prostitutes in Aylesbury. One girl gave evidence that she had had sex with 60 men, almost all of Pakistani heritage, when she was only 12 or 13, having been "conditioned to think it was normal behaviour". Sex took place in various locations in Aylesbury, including the girls' own homes. The men were friends living in the area, some married with children, some working in the market and some as taxi drivers.

Those found guilty were named as:

Name	Age	Charges	Prison sentences
Mohammed Imran	38	Rape, conspiracy to rape and child prostitution	19.5 years
Akbari Khan	36	Rape, administering a substance with intent and conspiracy to rape	16 years
Arshad Jani	33	Rape and conspiracy to rape	13 years
Vikram Singh	45	Rape and administering a substance with intent	17.5 years
Asif Hussain	33	Rape	13.5 year
Taimoor Khan	29	sexual activity with a child	3 years

== Reaction in Aylesbury and elsewhere ==
David Johnston, Buckinghamshire county council director for children's services, issued an apology to the two girls, saying: “We are as appalled as all parents and the community of Buckinghamshire will be by the despicable acts of cruel abuse committed by those found guilty at the Old Bailey today." He thanked them for their bravery in giving evidence and helping to secure convictions against some of their abusers. The chief executive of Barnardo's, Javed Khan, said that the case proved that perpetrators would pay for the "horrific crime" of child abuse and said that the "bravery of the victims giving evidence in this case should be commended."

== Sentencing and judge's comments ==
Following conviction in July 2015, the men were sentenced in September to jail terms ranging from three to nineteen-and-a-half years. Judge John Bevan QC said that "for the price of a McDonald's, a milkshake and cinema ticket", Girl A was sexually exploited by "stall holders in Aylesbury market, taxi and bus drivers". He said he could not explain why the criminals "focused their attention on white under-age girls", but believed their "vulnerability" played a major role. He said that if the criminals had targeted "Asian under-age girls, they would have paid a heavy price in their community." Girl A herself made a statement speaking of the effects of her exploitation by up to 60 Asian men, describing her feelings of "worthlessness" and her battles with depression and alcohol addiction. She added that she felt that her "teenage years were taken away". In her statement, Girl B said that the sentences were "academic" because "no sentence could ever put right what happened".

== See also ==
- List of sexual abuses perpetrated by groups
