= Rochdale child sex abuse ring =

21st-century criminal gang in Greater Manchester, England

The Rochdale child sex abuse ring targeted underage teenage girls in Rochdale, Greater Manchester, England. Nine men were convicted of sex trafficking and other offences including rape, trafficking girls for sex and conspiracy to engage in sexual activity with a child in May 2012. This resulted in Greater Manchester Police launching Operation Doublet and other operations to investigate further claims of abuse. Forty-seven girls were identified as victims of child sexual exploitation during the initial police investigation. The perpetrators were Muslim men, which led to discussion on whether the failure to investigate them was linked to the authorities' fear of being accused of racial prejudice. The victims were predominantly of White British heritage. One of the main traffickers, Shabir Ahmed, confirmed the specific racial targeting of White British girls, claiming the racial superiority of Pakistanis and denouncing the sexual liberation of British society.

There have been several reviews and reports written about the Rochdale child sexual abuse cases, including a Home Affairs Select Committee (HASC) report that was published in 2013. The events have also been widely covered in the media and portrayed in a BBC television drama, Three Girls, in 2017.

In March 2015, Greater Manchester Police apologised for its failure to investigate the child sexual exploitation allegations more thoroughly between 2008 and 2010. A GMP investigation into police conduct, supervised by the Independent Police Complaints Commission (IPCC), ended the same month. The investigation looked at the conduct of 13 officers between 2008 and 2010 and served notices of misconduct on seven. One officer was found to have warranted disciplinary action but was able to retire without any sanction being taken against him. The other six were given "words of advice" by their superior officers.

A 2024 report on child sex exploitation in Rochdale from 2004 to 2013 found that there was "compelling evidence" of widespread abuse, and that Greater Manchester Police and Rochdale Council had failed to properly investigate these cases, leaving girls "at the mercy of their abusers". While there were successful prosecutions, the report said that the investigations carried out during the period covered by the report only "scraped the surface" of what had happened, and that many abusers had gone unpunished.

As of October 2025 a total of 61 men had been convicted and jailed in relation to a number of different police investigations carried out since 2009. The total sentences handed down total almost 630 years.

== Perpetrators ==
Twelve men were initially charged with sex trafficking and other offences including: rape, trafficking girls for sex and conspiracy to engage in sexual activity with a child. On 8 May 2012 nine men were convicted of whom eight were of British Pakistani origin and one was an Afghan asylum-seeker. Of the three not convicted, one was cleared of all charges, the jury was unable to reach a verdict in the case of the second, and the third was not present at the trial after fleeing to Pakistan whilst on bail. Most of the men were married and well-respected within their community. One gang member convicted of sex trafficking was a religious studies teacher at a mosque and a married father of five. The men were aged 24–59 and all knew each other. Two worked for the same taxi firm and another two worked at a takeaway restaurant; some came from the same village in Pakistan and another two men shared a flat. The gang worked to secure underage girls to rape and exploit.

Two perpetrators, Adil Khan and Qari Abdul Rauf, who were convicted in May 2012, were released in 2014 and 2016 respectively, waiting to be deported to Pakistan after their British citizenship was revoked. After delays due to a dispute with Pakistan due to the two men renouncing Pakistani citizenship, and due to the cessation of direct flights to Pakistan in 2020, the Pakistani government indicated in June 2025 that they expected "progress" over a negotiated deportation. A third perpetrator and ringleader, Shabir Ahmed, was released in July 2026 after serving 14 years in prison and stripped of his British nationality, to be deported to Pakistan. The Government of Pakistan subsequently refused to accept Ahmed's return, while reports indicated that the issue had become the subject of wider diplomatic negotiations, including reported Pakistani requests concerning UK-based political dissidents.

== Abuse ==
The abuse of minor female children that occurred in 2008 and 2009 centred around two takeaways in Heywood near Rochdale. Despite one victim going to the police in 2008 to report the child grooming, the Crown Prosecution Service (CPS) decided not to prosecute two men, invoking the witness's lack of credibility.

Attempts by Rochdale Crisis Intervention Team co-ordinator for the NHS, Sara Rowbotham, to alert police and authorities to "patterns of sexual abuse" were ignored. Between 2003 and 2014, Rowbotham made more than 100 attempts to alert police and social services but was told the witnesses were not reliable.

As a result of the CPS dropping the case, the police halted their investigation, which was resumed when a second girl made complaints of a similar nature in December 2009. The CPS's original decision was overturned in 2011 when a new chief prosecutor for the region, Nazir Afzal, a first generation British-Pakistani, was appointed.

The victims, vulnerable teenagers from deprived, dysfunctional backgrounds, were targeted in "honeypot locations" where young people congregated, such as takeaway food shops. One victim, a 15-year-old known as the Honey Monster, acted as a recruiter, procuring girls as young as 13 for the gang. The victims were coerced and bribed into keeping quiet about the abuse by a combination of alcohol and drugs, food, small sums of money and other gifts.

The oldest person to be convicted, Shabir Ahmed, was for a while the main trafficker of the victims. On one occasion he ordered a girl aged 15 to have sex with Kabeer Hassan, as a "treat" for his birthday – Hassan then raped the girl. Abdul Aziz, a married father of three, took over from Shabir Ahmed as the main trafficker and was paid by various men to supply underage girls for sex.

Victims were physically assaulted and raped by as many as five men at a time, or obliged to have sex with "several men in a day, several times a week". The victims, plied with drugs and alcohol, were passed around friends and family, and taken to various locations in the north of England, including Rochdale, Oldham, Nelson, Bradford and Leeds. The abusers paid small sums of money for the encounters. One 13-year-old victim recounted that, after being forced to have sex in exchange for vodka, her abuser immediately raped her again and gave her £40 to not say anything about the incident. Among the incidents recorded by the police were a 15-year-old victim too drunk to recall being raped by 20 men, one after the other; and another victim so drunk that she vomited over the side of the bed as she was being raped by two men. One 13-year-old victim had an abortion after becoming pregnant.

== The first trial ==
The first major successful criminal prosecution of a grooming gang linked to Rochdale came in 2010 when nine men were convicted and jailed for abusing a 14-year-old girl from the town. The offending was said to have taken place in 2008. A number of linked, separate trials took place at Manchester Crown Court and the hearings heard how the girl went missing from home and was sexually exploited by a number of men, all of whom were of Asian heritage. The girl had been plied with drugs and alcohol and taken to Manchester to be abused by different men.

The perpetrators had been living in different areas of Greater Manchester before being jailed, including Hulme, Stretford, Gorton, Fallowfield and Rochdale. They were convicted of sexual activity with a child, controlling a child prostitute, facilitating child prostitution and paying for sexual services with a child and were jailed for between six months and seven years.

== Operation Span trial 2012 ==
Another police investigation began in 2008 after a girl was arrested for causing criminal damage at a takeaway in Heywood, a town that forms part of the borough of Rochdale. Following her arrest she told police she had been subjected to sexual exploitation on a number of occasions by a number of different men. The investigation was not adequately resourced and the Crown Prosecution Service decided not to proceed with the case on the basis that the main witness was not reliable and had "made a choice to work as a prostitute". The decision was reversed in 2011 by Nazir Afzal, the chief crown prosecutor for north-west England. Afzal later said he had received death threats over the decision.

In the intervening period police established a major incident team, Operation Span, to investigate exploitation centred around two takeaway restaurants in Heywood. Eventually, nine men were charged in connection with three victims from the Rochdale area.

During the trial in 2012 some gang members told the court the girls were willing participants and happy having sex with the men.

The ringleader, 59-year-old Shabir Ahmed, claimed the girls were "prostitutes" who had been running a "business empire" and it was all "white lies". He shouted in court, "Where are the white people? You have only got my kind here." Shabir Ahmed's threatening behaviour and calling Judge Gerald Clifton a "racist bastard" resulted in him being banned from the court for the sentencing hearing.

The trial concluded in May 2012 with the nine convictions. Shabir Ahmed received the longest sentence, 19 years for rape, aiding and abetting a rape, sexual assault, trafficking for sexual exploitation and conspiracy to engage in sexual activity with children. Mohammed Sajid was sentenced to 12 years for rape, sexual activity with a girl under 16, trafficking for sexual exploitation and conspiracy to engage in sexual activity with children. Kabeer Hassan was sentenced to nine years for rape and conspiracy to engage in sexual activity with children. Abdul Aziz received a similar sentence: nine years (concurrently) for trafficking for sexual exploitation and conspiracy to engage in sexual activity with children. Abdul Rauf was sentenced to six years for trafficking for sexual exploitation and conspiracy to engage in sexual activity with children. Adil Khan was sentenced to eight years for the same offences. Mohammed Amin received a five-year sentence for sexual assault and conspiracy to engage in sexual activity with children. Another five-year sentence was given to Abdul Qayyum for conspiracy to engage in sexual activity with children, while Hamid Safi received four years for trafficking for sexual exploitation and conspiracy to engage in sexual activity with children.

Four of the convicted, Shabir Ahmed, Adil Khan, Abdul Rauf and Abdul Aziz, who had dual British and Pakistani citizenships, were denaturalised (stripped of their British citizenship) by then Home Secretary Theresa May in order for them to be deported to Pakistan. May stated the revocations were "conducive to the public good".

In June 2026 it was revealed that Shabir Ahmed was set to be released from prison. Documents shared online said Ahmed could not be deported back to Pakistan due to provisions under the Immigration Act 1971.

In July 2026, British lawmakers including Andy Burnham pressured the Home Office to deport recently released Rochdale grooming gang leader Shabir Ahmed back to Pakistan. Ahmed's victim, who had been threatened at gunpoint by Ahmed in the past for speaking to the police, has been granted police protection after his release. As of 2026, Pakistan currently refuses Ahmed's deportation, who remained a Pakistani national, after losing his British citizenship following his conviction.

== Home Affairs Select Committee reports 2013 ==
In 2013 the Home Affairs Select Committee of the UK Parliament published a report into the Rochdale cases. The report found that responsibility for the failures to protect children was shared among police, social workers and Crown Prosecution Service (CPS) prosecutors and that the issue was a nationwide and growing issue.

== Operation Routh trials 2013 and 2014 ==
Operation Routh began in 2011 and related to a single victim discovered during Operation Span. In October 2013 five men were convicted. In December 2013 five men were jailed for a total of 26 years for offences against the 15-year-old victim. In June 2014 a further six men were convicted. This operation continued until 2015.

== Second sex ring and Operation Doublet trials 2015, 2016, 2017, ==
Following the break up of the first sex ring in May 2012, the police made arrests in relation to another child sexual exploitation ring in Rochdale. Nine men between 24 and 38 years old were arrested on suspicion of sexual activity with a child. Operation Doublet was launched at the same time as an investigation into child grooming and sexual abuse in the region. Assistant Chief Constable Steve Heywood said that about 550 officers were working on Operation Doublet in May 2013. He said the investigation was at "an extremely sensitive stage" and street grooming was the force's top priority, "a bigger priority than gun crime". He said the investigation was looking at cases in Rochdale dating back to 2003.

In March 2015, ten men aged between 26 and 45 were charged with serious sex offences against seven females aged between 13 and 23 at the time. The alleged offences that took place in Rochdale between 2005 and 2013 included rape, conspiracy to rape, inciting a child to engage in sexual activity, sexual activity with a child, and sexual assault.

In April 2016, nine of the men were sentenced to up to 25 years in jail for a series of sexual offences against teenage girls in Rochdale. One, Choudhry Hussain, fled the country to avoid being jailed. In September 2016, another four were jailed.

In September 2016 four men were jailed for over 37 years for a range of serious sexual offences as part of Operation Doublet. They were convicted after a trial at Manchester's Minshull Street Crown Court.

In February 2017, another five men were jailed as part of Operation Doublet.

In January 2020, Choudhry Hussain was jailed after being brought back to the UK from Pakistan. He was sentenced to 19 years.

== Operation Infrared 2015 ==
Operation Infrared was a joint operation between Greater Manchester Police (GMP) and Rochdale Borough Council that began in 2014. It focused on three children who repeatedly went missing from independent care homes in Rochdale. The children had been placed in Rochdale by councils outside of the borough and were not in the care of Rochdale Borough Council. Four men, including two from Oldham, were jailed in August 2015. The trial heard that the men gave the victims alcohol and drugs before abusing them. The operation was run by the Sunrise Team, a multi-agency team that includes police, council and NHS staff in Rochdale.

== Operation Lytton 2023, 2025 ==
In 2015, a further police operation, Lytton, was launched. This investigation was borne out of Operation Doublet and initially related to two victims who reported being abused between 2002 and 2006. In March 2023, eight men were charged with a total of 82 offences. In May 2023, a further ten men were charged with 76 offences.

On 17 August 2023 five of the eight men who were charged in March 2023 were convicted of historical child sexual offences following a trial at Manchester Minshull Street Crown Court. On 31 October 2023 the five men were jailed for sentences that ranged between eight and 17 years.

Another trial related to Operation Lytton took place in June 2025. Eight Asian men were charged over the sexual abuse of two teenage girls across a five-year period. Two of the defendants, Mohammed Zahid and Roheez Khan, had previously been convicted in other grooming trials in 2016 and 2013 respectively. Seven defendants were found guilty of rape and sexual exploitation on 13 June 2025. The eighth defendant was acquitted after the prosecution chose not to present evidence against him. Zahid, identified as the ringleader, was sentenced to 35 years in prison on 1 October 2025. In total, the seven offenders were sentenced to a combined 174 years.

Another trial involving six men who were accused of abusing two girls between 2003 and 2006 began on 6 October 2025 but was halted in December. The judge discharged the jury following concerns about a WhatsApp group jurors had been using during proceedings. A retrial was due to begin in August 2026.

== Reaction and public debate ==
The case raised a serious debate about whether the crimes were racially motivated. Suggestions emerged that police and social work departments failed to act when details of the gang emerged for fear of appearing racist, and vulnerable white teenagers being groomed by Pakistani men were ignored. A report by the deputy children's commissioner in 2012 said that 33% of child sex abuse by gangs in Britain was committed by British Asians, where Asians are 7% of the population, but concluded that it was "irresponsible" to dwell on the data.

Tim Loughton, the Minister for Children and Families, said that while there was no evidence that ethnic communities condoned child sexual abuse, he was concerned that some had been slow to report it to the police, and urged police and social workers not to allow "political correctness around ethnicity" to hinder their work to apprehend such criminals.

In late 2011, the Office of the Children's Commissioner began a two-year long inquiry into child sexual exploitation by street gangs. The inquiry issued its final report in November 2013. After members of the Rochdale gang were sentenced, the UK's Department for Education announced new funding for a specialist foster care scheme to protect vulnerable children in residential care, where some victims had been.

=== The Times report of 5 January 2011 ===
A report by The Times on 5 January 2011, related to convictions for child sex grooming in the North and Midlands. Of the 56 offenders convicted since 1997 for crimes relating to on-street grooming of girls aged 11 to 16, three were white, 53 were Asian of which 50 were Muslim, and most were from the British Pakistani community. Furthermore, The Times article alleged: "with the exception of one town there is scant evidence of work being undertaken in British Pakistani communities to confront the problem" of "pimping gangs" largely consisting of "members of the British Pakistani community".

The findings have been questioned by researchers Ella Cockbain and Helen Brayley, from whose work for the UCL Jill Dando Institute of Security and Crime Science The Times report had drawn much of its evidence. "The citations are correct but they have been taken out of context," Cockbain told The Independent; "Nor do they acknowledge the small sample size of the original research, which focused on just two large cases." Cockbain and Brayley expressed concern that "findings were being overextended from a small, geographically concentrated sample to characterise an entire crime type".

=== Coalition for the Removal of Pimping ===
Hilary Willmer, representing a Leeds-based support group for parents of sexually exploited girls, the Coalition for the Removal of Pimping (Crop), was quoted as saying "The vast majority [of] perpetrators are Pakistani Asians", with sources inside Crop claiming a percentage as high as 80 per cent although, The Independent said that "Kurdish, Romanian and Albanian gangs were also involved". Willmer added: "We think this is the tip of the iceberg", although she cautioned against treating the matter as a race crime: "It's a criminal thing." By May 2012, according to The Independent, Crop had "gone suddenly silent" concerning the percentage of abusers of Asian origin who had come to the organisation's attention: Willmer explained to the paper: "We've been accused of being a cover for the BNP".

=== Child protection organisations ===
In 2011, the Child Exploitation and Online Protection Centre launched a five-month long investigation into whether there was a link between racial profile and the crime of underage grooming. The organisation defined underage grooming as any situation where a child or young person received a gift in exchange for sexual favours. It drew statistics from organisations such as Barnardo's but the findings were considered inconclusive by expert academics because not all the figures had been compiled in the same way and ethnicity had not always been noted with each reported crime. Ella Cockbain and Helen Brayley pointed out, "There is no criminal offence of 'on-street grooming' and as a result it is very difficult to measure the extent of the crime based on court statistics." Further research has been pursued since late 2011 by the Office of the Children's Commissioner.

Wendy Shepherd, child sexual exploitation project manager for Barnardo's in the north of England, said that since she started working with the organisation, there has been "a shift from the men selling children in ones or twos to something that is much more organised in groups and networks. The networks of men come from different backgrounds: in the North and Midlands many have been British Asians; in Devon it was white men; in Bath and Bristol, Afro-Caribbeans; in London, all ethnic mixes, whites, Iraqis, Kurds, Afghans, Somalis". She noted that white male predators on the street tend to work alone. She added: "The danger with saying that the problem is with one ethnicity is that then people will only be on the lookout for that group – and will risk missing other threats."

The former head of Barnardo's, Martin Narey, said on BBC Radio 4's Today programme: "For this particular type of crime, the street grooming of teenage girls in northern towns … there is very troubling evidence that Asians are overwhelmingly represented in the prosecutions for such offences." Narey rejected the idea that such gangs were specifically targeting white girls, but suggested vulnerable girls on the street were more likely to be white since Asian girls were subjected to strict parenting and were more likely to be kept off the streets.

=== Response from Muslim spokespeople ===
In a BBC documentary investigating grooming young girls for sex by some Pakistani men, Imam Irfan Chishti from the Rochdale Council of Mosques deplored the practice, saying it was "very shocking to see fellow British Muslims brought to court for this kind of horrific offence." Mohammed Shafiq, chief executive of the Ramadhan Foundation, accused elders of the Pakistani community of "burying their heads in the sand" on the matter of sexual grooming. He said that of convictions involving child sexual exploitation, 87% were of British Pakistani men and it was a significant problem for that community. He said the actions of criminals who thought "white teenage girls are worthless and can be abused" were "bringing shame on our community."

Sayeeda Warsi, co-chairperson of the Conservative Party, in an interview with the Evening Standard, said "You can only start solving a problem if you acknowledge it first," and added, "This small minority who see women as second class citizens, and white women probably as third class citizens, are to be spoken out against." She described the Rochdale case as "even more disgusting" than cases of girls being passed around street gangs, as the perpetrators "were grown men, some of them religious teachers or running businesses, with young families of their own."

Nazir Afzal, who as the newly appointed chief crown prosecutor decided to bring the case to trial, said that sex, not race, was the key issue: "There is no community where women and girls are not vulnerable to sexual attack and that's a fact."

=== Hindu and Sikh objections ===
Hindu and Sikh groups have objected to media use of the "Asian" description saying that the culprits were "almost always of Pakistani origin" and "Muslim". They contend that clouding the issue by calling them "Asians" is unfair towards other groups and detrimental to a frank discussion.

=== Taxi controversy ===
Two of the convicted gang members worked at Eagle Taxis, which was taken over by Car 2000 after the scandal. The company's owner said that due to requests, clients could choose to have a white driver but this was reversed after 50 Asian drivers protested.

=== Moral panic ===
One study suggested that the British media's portrayal of South Asian men as perpetrators of sexual violence against white victims is an example of a moral panic. In particular the study pointed out that the inquiry by the Office of the Children's Commissioner found that, while all of the victims in the Rochdale case were white, and eight out of nine of the perpetrators were men of South Asian descent, there were many other sexual violence cases in Britain where "perpetrators and their victims were ethnically diverse."

=== BBC series ===
In May 2017, the BBC broadcast Three Girls, a miniseries about the case. Actress Maxine Peake starred in the series as Sara Rowbotham, the sexual health aid worker who first uncovered the patterns of severe abuse in the area, but struggled to bring it to the attention of authorities. Actress Lesley Sharp played the police detective Margaret Oliver in the series.

== Greater Manchester reviews ==
An independent review of child sex exploitation was commissioned by the Greater Manchester mayor Andy Burnham after a BBC documentary The Betrayed Girls about child sex abuse cases in Greater Manchester was aired in 2017. The third part of the review, which focuses on Rochdale was released on 15 January 2024. It examined 111 cases that took place in Rochdale from 2004 to 2013. It found "compelling evidence that there was widespread organised sexual exploitation of children in Rochdale from 2004 onwards", but these child sexual exploitation cases were not properly investigated despite warnings by whistleblowers to the Greater Manchester Police and Rochdale Council. Child sex abuse cases were also not considered a priority by the Greater Manchester Police, their investigations were under-resourced, and children were "left at the mercy" of their abusers.

The Rochdale report identified 74 children who were sexually exploited, and for 48 of them there were "serious failures to protect the child". It also identified 96 men still considered a potential risk to children, and that they represented “only a proportion of the individuals engaged in CSE" in this period. However, in relation to the 96 men the report also said some would be duplicates "as some of the individuals we have identified are recorded by one name or a nickname". The successful prosecutions that arose from these cases involved only 13 of the 74 children. The report said that while "Operation Span was presented as having resolved the matter of CSE in Rochdale", "Operation Span had only scraped the surface of the problem and that many men who had serially abused children had not been apprehended, including the organised crime gang first drawn to their attention in 2007".

In March 2024 Greater Manchester Police released information that confirmed further details of the 96 men. Following a post-publication review of information, police found that 43 had been subject to police action, 37 were referred to only as nicknames and not identifiable, 15 were likely to be duplicates and one was deceased.

The report released in January 2024 made no recommendations to Rochdale Borough Council and no new police investigations have been launched as a result.

In July 2025 His Majesty’s Inspectorate of Constabulary, Fire and Rescue Services (HMICFRS), supported by Ofsted and the Care Quality Commission (CQC), published their final report into their inspection of Greater Manchester Police (GMP) and wider safeguarding partners’ approach to investigating allegations of child criminal and sexual exploitation.

In it, they said "GMP has made significant improvements in how it investigates child sexual exploitation” and have concluded that “Greater Manchester’s complex safeguarding peer review programme contributes positively to…reduce the risk of child exploitation.”

HMICFRS looked at 74 victims and survivors of child sexual exploitation, who were identified through the work of the independent review team in its report about Rochdale. They concluded that local investigations had been set up to address the problem many years before the reviews began. They found that the force revisited the circumstances for each identified person and on all but one occasion revisited these potential victims

== Review of police actions ==
In December 2013, the case review by Rochdale Council was leaked, which highlighted findings from an internal police investigation. The review acknowledged that police officers might have discriminatory attitudes towards the victims, that the victims were interviewed by detectives without training in child exploitation and no strategy when victims returned to their abusers. One example mentioned was the issue of child protection for one of the victims, which was discussed in 40 meetings, without any record of police attendance. Also cited were a lack of managerial oversight in 2008 and 2009 and lack of resources and managerial support for the investigations despite formal requests. Finally, officers did not challenge a Crown Prosecution Service decision not to prosecute. The review recommended the Greater Manchester Police establish a monitoring system and commit to maintaining a child sexual exploitation team.

On 13 March 2015, Greater Manchester Police apologised for its failure to investigate child sexual exploitation allegations more thoroughly between 2008 and 2010. The apology was made after a review by the Independent Police Complaints Commission "examined the conduct and actions of 13 officers who were involved in Operation Span and the policing of Rochdale Division." Operation Span was the investigation launched in December 2009 into allegations made against the individuals who were convicted in 2012, and others. Assistant Chief Constable Dawn Copley said that, at the time of the earlier investigation, "there was a strong target driven focus, predominantly on serious acquisitive crime. At best this was distracting for leaders and influenced the areas that resources were focused on". She said that seven officers had been served with misconduct notices, but no further disciplinary action would be taken against them. Copley said: "We apologise to the victims and we give them our assurance that lessons have been learned, changes have been made and we are determined to use this to continue making improvements."

Of the seven officers who were served notices of misconduct, the only one who was found to have warranted disciplinary action retired before it could be brought.

== National Audit on Group-based Child Sexual Exploitation and Abuse ==
On 16 June 2025 the government published the National Audit on Group-based Child Sexual Exploitation and Abuse that had been carried out by Baroness Louise Casey. The Rochdale cases are referenced within the report but only one of the successful prosecutions is mentioned. The report noted the reluctance of Rochdale Council and Greater Manchester Police to cooperate with the review team on past events.

Casey, who had previously rejected the idea, called for a national inquiry. She said she had changed her mind due to the failure of many local councils to set up their own inquiries and the reluctance of some organisations to talk to her own investigators. The Prime Minister Keir Starmer announced two days before the report was published that there would be a full national statutory inquiry into grooming gangs.

== See also ==
- List of sexual abuses perpetrated by groups
- Post-assault treatment of sexual assault victims
- Jimmy Savile sexual abuse scandal
