= Uncut =

Uncut may refer to:

- Any creative work that is not abridged, or that is not edited, or that is not censored.
- Uncut (film), a 1997 Canadian docudrama film by John Greyson about censorship
- Uncut (magazine), a monthly British magazine with a focus on music, which began publishing in May 1997
- BET: Uncut, a Black Entertainment Television show that ended in 2006
- Kinski Uncut, the 1996 re-published title of Klaus Kinski's autobiography
- UK Uncut, United Kingdom–based tax avoidance protest groups established in October 2010
- US Uncut, United States–based tax avoidance protest groups established in February 2011
- Without circumcision
- Uncut (band), a Canadian rock band formed in 2001
- Uncut (album), an album by The Powder Blues
- Un-Cut, British music group active from 2001 to 2004
