= Sophie Duker =

British stand-up comedian

- Duker at the 2026 Edinburgh Festival Fringe
- Born: London, England
- Education: Wadham College, Oxford
- Occupation: Comedian
- Years active: 2015–present
- Website: thesophieduker.com

Sophie Duker (born 1990) is a British stand-up comedian and writer.

== Early life ==
Duker was born in London to first-generation immigrants from West Africa. Her mother is from Cameroon and her father is from Ghana. She attended North London Collegiate School before studying French and English at Wadham College, Oxford. She joined the Oxford Imps in her first year at university.

== Career ==
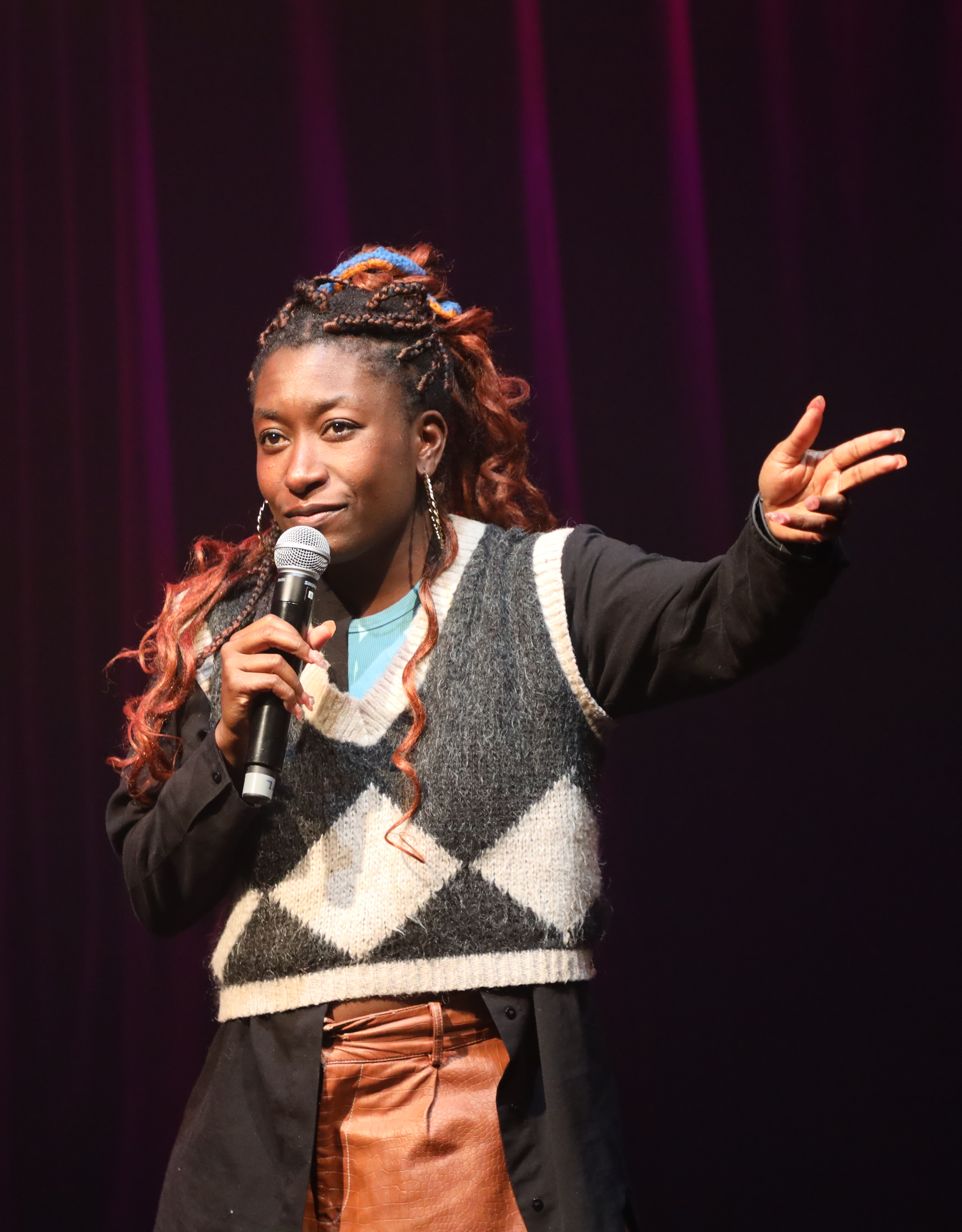
Duker at the 2024 Edinburgh Festival Fringe

An alumna of the Pleasance Comedy Reserve, Duker was shortlisted for the Funny Women award in 2015. She founded and hosted the "Manic Pixie Dream Girls" show as part of Edinburgh's Free Festival in 2016 and 2017.

She has written for the Huffington Post and she was an assistant producer for Frankie Boyle's New World Order and a researcher for 8 Out of 10 Cats Does Countdown. In 2019, she appeared on 8 Out of 10 Cats, Frankie Boyle's New World Order, Dave Gorman: Terms and Conditions Apply, and Mock the Week, and in 2020 in 8 Out of 10 Cats Does Countdown.

In 2017, Duker appeared in a Turtle Canyon short titled "The Dates", which explores bisexual dating culture.

In 2018, Duker set up the comedy night "Wacky Racists", which currently has a monthly residency at 2Northdown in King's Cross, London, and performs spin-off shows at festivals and events across the UK. In December 2019, Soho Theatre hosted a seasonal Christmas "Wacky Racists" special.

Duker co-starred in the pilot for a hidden camera sketch show on Channel 4 called Riot Girls as well as on the Comedy Central UK comedy show What I Wish I’d Said in 2018.

Her first stand-up show, "Diet Woke", premiered in 2018. She took her 2019 show, "Venus", to the Brighton Fringe and the Edinburgh Fringe, performing at the Edinburgh Pleasance from 31 July to 25 August 2019. In 2019, Duker appeared on the hip-hop comedy panel show Don't Hate the Playaz.

In September 2020, during one of Duker's appearances on Frankie Boyle's New World Order, the host Frankie Boyle proposed the motion "Black Lives Matter Glosses Over The Complexities Of A World Where We All Need To Come Together And Kill Whitey". A clip of Duker making a joke which repeated the phrase "kill whitey"—a phrase pre-approved by the BBC, according to Duker—was widely spread online. Duker joked about the phrase in the context of discussing her views on whiteness and capitalism in response to a 1970s clip of James Baldwin talking about black power. Duker described that "far-right blogs to mainstream tabloids" began covering the story six days after the episode aired, with the Daily Mail's Sarah Vine criticising the comments as "hateful dogma", after which 1,300 complaints were made to the BBC. The BBC responded that the content was "within audience expectations for a post-watershed, topical, satirical programme from a comedian whose style and tone are well-established", later dismissing the complaints. A Greater Manchester police hate crime investigation was opened after a report in early January and closed a week later with no action. Duker was subjected to racist harassment on social media over the comments.

In 2021, she was hired by Rumpus Media to co-present a new female-led topical panel show on Comedy Central called Yesterday, Today and The Day Before alongside fellow comedians Suzi Ruffell and Maisie Adam. However, Duker quit after the first episode in protest over cuts to her monologue about conflict between Israel and Palestine, with comedian Kemah Bob and the show's assistant producer also quitting the show alongside her.

Duker's first gig after lockdown was a fundraiser for Reclaim These Streets in July 2021. In 2022, she won the thirteenth season of the comedy panel game show Taskmaster, and the quiz show Celebrity Mastermind. She won her episode of the latter with the specialist subject of Alan Bennett's play The History Boys. She returned to the Edinburgh Festival line-up in 2022 with a show titled "Hag".

== Personal life ==
Duker is queer.

== Filmography ==
Year	Title	Notes
2017	The Dates	Short film
2019–2023	Frankie Boyle's New World Order	10 episodes
2019–2020	Mock the Week	3 episodes
2019–2020	8 Out of 10 Cats	2 episodes
2019	The Dog Ate My Homework	1 episode
2019	Don't Hate the Playaz	1 episode
2019	Dave Gorman: Terms and Conditions Apply	1 episode
2020	Roast Battle	1 episode
2020	8 Out of 10 Cats Does Countdown	1 episode
2020	Comedy Game Night	1 episode
2020	Jonathan Ross' Comedy Club	1 episode
2020	Sorry, I Didn't Know	1 episode
2021	The Science(ish) of Stranger Things	1 episode
2021	The Last Leg	1 episode
2021	Richard Osman's House of Games	5 episodes
2021	Yesterday, Today and The Day Before	1 episode
2021	Joe Lycett's Got Your Back	2 episodes
2021	Comedians Giving Lectures	1 episode
2022	Taskmaster	Winner, series 13
2022	Celebrity Mastermind	Episode 10; Winner
2024	Taskmaster	Runner-up, Champion of Champions III
2024	Richard Osman's House of Games	5 episodes, Redemption week
