= RSU =

RSU may refer to:

== Universities ==
- Rangsit University, Pathum Thani, Thailand
- Riga Stradiņš University, Latvia
- Rivers State University, Nigeria
- Rogers State University, Oklahoma, United States
- Rostov State University, Russia
- Romblon State University, Philippines

== Student unions ==
- Radical Students Union, a frontal organization of the Communist Party of India (Maoist), a Naxalite group
- Ryerson Students' Union, student organization at Ryerson University in Canada
- Roehampton Students Union, student organization at the University of Roehampton in the UK

== Other ==
- Regional school unit, a type of school district in Maine, United States
- Restricted stock unit, a form of stock award
- Garda Regional Support Unit, of the Irish police
- Rough Sleepers Unit, a former UK government programme; see Rough Sleepers Initiative § Rough Sleepers Unit (RSU)
- RSU, ICAO code for AeroSur (1992-2012), a defunct Bolivian airline
- RSU, IATA code for Yeosu Airport in South Korea
