= Merry Cross =

British poet and disability activist

- Occupations: Poet, disability activist
- Organization: Disabled People Against Cuts
- Known for: Co-founding the Liberation Network of People with Disabilities
- Notable work: Proud Child, Safer Child (1998); Apricot Toast (2021)
- Movement: Disability rights movement

Merry Cross is a poet and disability activist who lives in Reading, Berkshire. She was a founding member of Liberation Network of People with Disabilities and is a volunteer with Disabled People Against Cuts (DPAC). Cross has previously worked as a social care inspector, a teacher, and a psychologist. She later began working as a disability consultant.

== Activism ==
Cross was a founding member of the Liberation Network of People with Disabilities, a British disability activism group. The group published a In From the Cold, a magazine that been credited with helping establish the social model of disability.

In 1987 Cross was a cast member in A Private View, produced by Graeae Theatre Company. The show featured an all disabled cast and was Graeae's first all female production. The show toured around the UK and Malaysia.

In 1998, Cross published Proud Child, Safer Child: A handbook for parents and carers of disabled children. The book was praised for its coverage of such a complex subject and for combating the myth that disabled children may not be distressed by abuse due to their disability.

Cross has volunteered with DPAC for several years, running her local Berkshire DPAC branch. Her with work the branch has included protesting against cuts to Independent Living Fund, Personal Independence Payment and the introduction of the Bedroom tax.

In 2012, Cross was involved in an UK Uncut protest against cuts to Disability Living Allowance, where disabled activists blocked Oxford Circus for more than two hours. Demonstrators in wheelchairs chained themselves together across the junction, with Cross stating she joined to protest to make sure disabled people were heard.

Cross contributed to the 2020 poetry compilation, CoronaVerses: poems from the pandemic. In 2021 she also published an anthology of poetry titled Apricot Toast: Three Generations of Poets.

In September 2025, Cross helped organise the one day Disability Pride: Radical Reset event in Brighton.

== Publications ==
- Cross, Merry (1998). Proud Child, Safer Child : A handbook for parents and carers of disabled children. The Woman's Press Ltd. ISBN 0704345617.
- CoronaVerses: Poems from the Pandemic. 1 April 2020. ISBN 9781393770893.
- Cross, Merry (2021). Apricot Toast: Three Generations of Poets. ISBN 9781789632057.
