= Hoad's Wood =

Site of Special Scientific Interest in Kent, England

Coordinates: 51.148°N 0.79°E

- Site of Special Scientific Interest
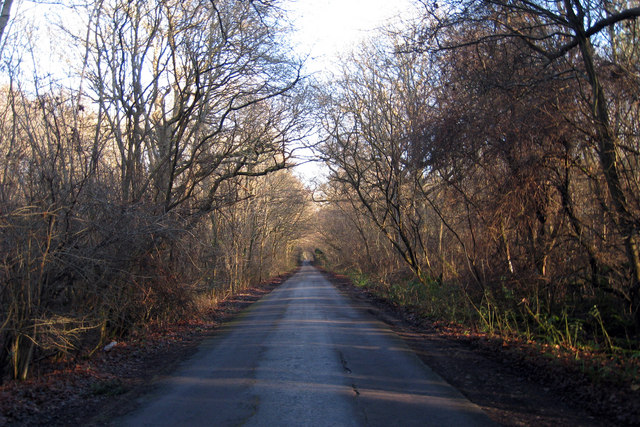
- Location of Hoad's Wood.
- Area of search: Kent
- Grid reference: TQ 952 425
- Interest: Biological
- Area: 80.5 hectares (199 acres)
- Notification date: 1989
- Location map: Magic Map

Hoad's Wood is an 80.5-hectare (199-acre) biological Site of Special Scientific Interest west of Ashford in Kent.

Natural England described the woodland thus: "This site is a good example of a pedunculate oak-hornbeam woodland on Wealden Clay [comprising] mainly hornbeam coppice-with-standards and oakhazel woodland with some sweet chestnut coppice. There is an outstanding assemblage of insects: moths and butterflies are particularly well documented. The wood also supports a diverse breeding bird community." Birds breeding in the wood include nightingale, woodcock, nuthatch, great-spotted woodpecker and several kinds of tits and warblers.

The site is private land with no public access.

In March 2021, the woodland was the site where the remains of Sarah Everard were found after her abduction and murder.

In January 2024 Hoad's Wood received national attention when it was reported the woodland had become an illegal rubbish dump. Access to the site was blocked by the Environment Agency and a court order put in place to prevent illegal tipping. During 2025–26, the waste was cleared by specialist contractors at a public cost of £15 million.
