= Louise Casey, Baroness Casey of Blackstock =

British public official (born 1965)

The Right Honourable The Baroness Casey of Blackstock DBE CB
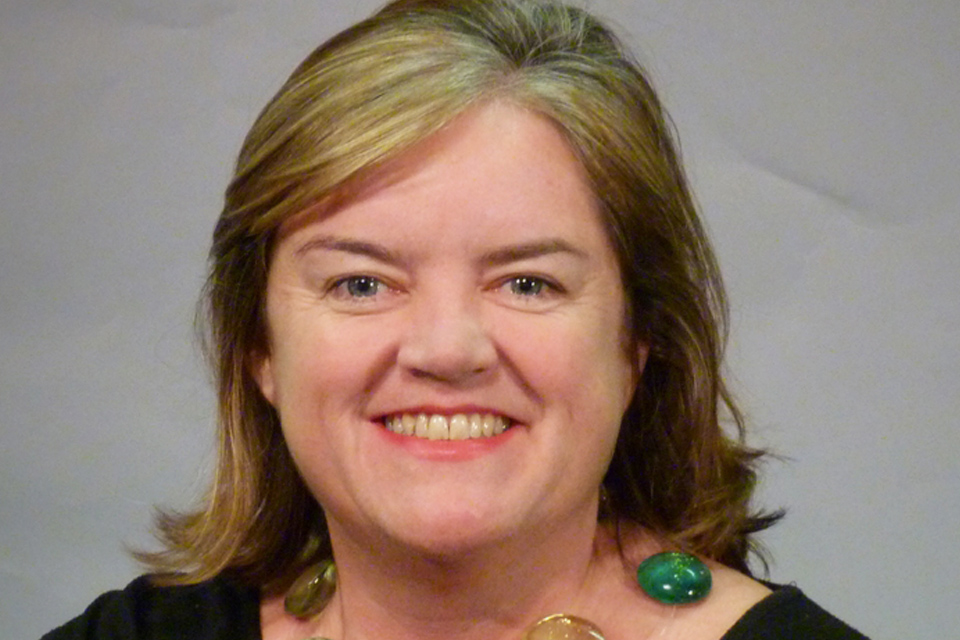
- Casey in 2012

Victims' Commissioner
- In office May 2010 – 12 October 2011
- Appointed by: Jack Straw
- Preceded by: Office created
- Succeeded by: The Baroness Newlove

Member of the House of Lords
- Lord Temporal
- Life peerage 30 October 2020

Personal details
- Born: Louise Casey; 29 March 1965 (age 61) Redruth, Cornwall, England
- Party: None (crossbencher)
- Education: Goldsmiths, University of London (BA)

Louise Casey, Baroness Casey of Blackstock, DBE, CB (born 29 March 1965), is a crossbench peer and current British government official, where she serves as lead non-executive director. She was the deputy director of Shelter in 1992, the head of the Rough Sleepers' Unit (RSU) in 1999, a director of the national Anti-Social Behaviour Unit (ASBU) in 2003, head of the Respect Task Force in 2005 and the UK's first Victims' Commissioner in March 2010. She became director general of Troubled Families on 1 November 2011.

In February 2020, Boris Johnson appointed her as an adviser to help tackle homelessness, and she was later appointed as chair of the Rough Sleeping Taskforce, which was set up to curb rough sleeping during the COVID-19 pandemic. In July 2020 she was nominated for a crossbench peerage.

In August 2021, Casey was appointed to review the circumstances and prepare a report on the spectator invasion of Wembley Stadium, London, in July 2021 when thousands of ticket-less spectators broke through security arrangements for the final of the UEFA Euro 2020 football tournament. Later in 2021, Casey was appointed to lead an independent review of culture and standards into the Metropolitan Police in London following the murder of Sarah Everard. Her report, published in March 2023, concluded that the Metropolitan Police was "institutionally racist, sexist and broken".

In 2024, Casey was reportedly touted by Labour Party leader Sir Keir Starmer for a ministerial role in a future government, should he win the general election. In January 2025, she was appointed as the government's lead non-executive director.

In January 2025, in response to growing public pressure for a national inquiry into the grooming gangs scandal, Casey was commissioned to produce a national audit on group-based child sexual exploitation and abuse, which was published in June 2025. The audit found widespread data failures obscuring the scale of grooming-gang abuse, though evidence shows disproportionate numbers of offenders of Asian, especially Pakistani background, in certain geographical areas. It calls for a national inquiry, mandatory ethnicity and nationality recording, tougher child-protection laws, and tighter taxi-licensing rules. On 22 October 2025, Sir Keir Starmer appointed Casey to help carry out the national inquiry.

== Early life ==
Louise Casey was born on 29 March 1965 in Redruth, Cornwall, to Peggy and Martin Casey, a union representative at Plessey. She was educated at Oaklands Catholic School, near Portsmouth, and graduated from Goldsmiths, University of London, with a degree in history.

== Career ==
Casey began her career with the Department of Health and Social Security (DHSS), administering benefit payments for homeless people. She then worked for the St Mungo Association, a charity that helps homeless people. She became director of the Homeless Network in London, before becoming deputy director of Shelter in 1992. At Shelter she gained a reputation as an "ambitious, pragmatic worker who got results" and was largely responsible for the creation in 1998 of Shelterline, the country's first 24-hour telephone helpline for homeless people.

=== Rough Sleepers Unit ===
Following the 1997 general election, the Labour government in December that year created the Social Exclusion Unit (SEU), which had the Rough Sleepers Initiative as one of its priorities. In April 1999 the Rough Sleepers Unit (RSU) was created and Casey appointed by Prime Minister Tony Blair as its head, referred to in the media as the "homelessness czar". With an eventual budget of £200 million, the RSU's aim was to reduce the number of rough sleepers in England by two-thirds by April 2002. The RSU published its strategy in December 1999.

In November 1999 Casey said that the activities of some charities had the effect of keeping homeless people on the streets: "With soup runs and other kinds of charity help, well-meaning people are spending money servicing the problem on the streets and keeping it there. Even The Big Issue is perpetuating the problem." The editor of The Big Issue disagreed with her comments.

In November 2000, the government launched the RSU-led "Change a Life" campaign, which encouraged people to give money to homelessness charities instead of to beggars, following research suggesting that 86 per cent of beggars used drugs. Casey said giving money to beggars was "misplaced goodwill". The donations hotline set up as part of the campaign was closed in March 2002, having collected £10,000, with advertising spending of £240,000. The RSU achieved its target in November 2001, several months before the deadline, but allegations were made that they had used underhand tactics; Casey responded that they were false. With her work at the RSU finished, she became director of the newly created Homelessness Directorate.

=== Anti-Social Behaviour Unit ===
In January 2003, Casey became head of the Anti-Social Behaviour Unit (ASBU) at the Home Office. Introduced in 1998, an Anti-Social Behaviour Order is a civil order made against a person who has been shown, on the balance of evidence, to have engaged in anti-social behaviour.

=== Respect Task Force; crime adviser ===
In September 2005, Casey was appointed head of the Respect Task Force as part of Blair's "respect agenda", becoming known as the "respect czar".

The Respect Action Plan, launched in January 2006, was designed to deal with anti-social behaviour and problematic young people and families.

In December 2007, the task force was closed down, and Casey moved to another job concerned with community policing. Her review of "Engaging Communities in Fighting Crime" was published in 2008, being based largely on her contact with the public.

She recommended the requirement, introduced in December 2008, that offenders doing community work should wear fluorescent orange jackets with the words "community payback" printed on the backs.

In October 2009, while working as the government's neighbourhood crime adviser, Casey said that the justice system favoured criminals, and the public wanted a justice system that was not a "criminal's justice system".

=== Victims' Commissioner ===
On 30 March 2010, Casey was appointed the inaugural commissioner for victims and witnesses, created under the Domestic Violence, Crime and Victims Act 2004, whose objective is to "promote the interests of victims and witnesses, encourage good practice in their treatment, and regularly review the Code of Practice for Victims which sets out the services victims can expect to receive". As Victims' Commissioner, Casey said crime victims were treated poorly by the system, and suggested jury trials were unnecessary for many lesser offences. She held the post from May 2010 to October 2011 and was succeeded by Baroness Newlove in March 2013.

=== Troubled Families programme ===
It was reported in September 2011 that Casey would work with Prime Minister David Cameron in dealing with the consequences of widespread rioting a month earlier, and she resigned from the position of Victims' Commissioner on 12 October 2011.

She became director general of the Troubled Families Unit on 1 November 2011. The programme intended to focus interventions on the 120,000 most dysfunctional families to break the cycle of abuse. In July 2012 Casey published the Listening to Troubled Families report which featured 16 case studies following interviews with families about their situations. In a half-way report released in November 2013, the government stated that 22,000 families had been "turned around".

Casey left the programme in 2015, and an official evaluation by the National Institute for Economic and Social Research (NIESR) published in 2016 found that despite the £1 billion spent on the programme, it had failed to have any significant impact. In response Casey stated: "They had not, frankly, put any of the caveats in the public domain" and that "they have misrepresented their own research". NIESR disputed these statements.

=== Rotherham investigation ===
Following the publication of a report by Alexis Jay on the Rotherham child sexual exploitation scandal, Casey was appointed by Eric Pickles to lead the inspection of the children's services at Rotherham council. The Guardian reported on 10 September 2014: "In his written ministerial statement, Pickles says he has directed Casey to consider how the council exercised its functions on governance, children and young people, and taxi and private hire licensing.'"

Casey's report was published on 4 February 2015, and found that the local authority's child sexual exploitation (CSE) team was poorly directed, suffered from excessive case loads, and did not share information.

The Secretary of State for Communities and Local Government, Eric Pickles, said the local authority was "not fit for purpose", and announced proposals to remove its control from the councillors and give it to a team of five appointed commissioners. The Labour Party leader Ed Miliband said that his party had "let people down in Rotherham". However, Casey's report was also heavily criticised by social work academics in Community Care in March 2015:

"There are troubling aspects of the report...the process by which it was prepared, in particular the lack of rigor [sic] and transparency in the methods used to gather and analyse data...This gap [in methodology] ...should concern us as it goes to the heart of issues of accuracy."

=== Review of community cohesion and extremism ===
After the end of the Rotherham report, Casey was asked to undertake a broader review of community cohesion and extremism. The report criticised the Home Office for a lack of strategy to integrate new immigrants into communities and to respond to extremism among Muslims.

The Review was finally published on 5 December 2016. The Review stated segregation and social exclusion are at "worrying levels" and are fuelling inequality in some areas of Britain. Women in some communities are denied "even their basic rights as British residents". The report described the plight of women in some Muslim communities, who were "less likely to speak English and more likely to be kept at home". Among Casey's recommendations were that immigrants could take "an oath of integration with British values and society" and schoolchildren be taught about British values.

In March 2018, while speaking on BBC Radio 4's The Westminster Hour, Casey suggested that, in order to encourage integration, the government should set a target date for "everybody in the country" to speak English. Conservative MP and former immigration minister Mark Harper welcomed the comments.

=== Rough sleeping taskforce ===
In February 2020 Casey was appointed by Prime Minister Johnson to carry out a review of the government's strategy on homelessness, which aimed to end rough sleeping by 2024. This work was redirected due to the COVID-19 pandemic, and she is credited with arranging temporary accommodation for close to 15,000 rough sleepers as part of the government's Everyone In initiative. In May 2020 she was appointed to chair a specialist taskforce on rough sleeping, which worked with local authorities to prevent the return of rough sleeping as the lockdown lifted.

In August 2020 Casey announced that she had resigned from her government advisory role, including chairing the taskforce, stating that she wished to concentrate on her responsibilities in the House of Lords following her acceptance of a crossbench peerage the previous month.

=== International homeless work ===
Casey is the chair of the Institute of Global Homelessness. She left the civil service in 2017 to help establish the Institute, with the aim of delivering an international solution to homelessness across the world.

=== Metropolitan Police ===
On 20 March 2023, Casey's report into the Metropolitan Police was released. It found the Met to be institutionally racist, sexist and homophobic. One key publicised finding was that the Metropolitan Police was a "boys' club", despite having been led by Cressida Dick, a woman, from 2017 to 2022.

=== Media work ===
In January 2024 Casey examined issues affecting modern Britain in a BBC Radio 4 series Fixing Britain with Louise Casey; the five episodes covered rough sleeping, hunger, children in care, violence against women, and cohesion.

=== Lead non-executive director ===
In January 2025, Casey was appointed by Prime Minister Keir Starmer as the government's lead non-executive director (NED), responsible for overseeing non-executives (advisors to the government who aid in areas where they have relevant experience, but who do not have decision-making power).

Casey is also set to chair an independent commission to reform adult social care in England. Talks were due to begin in February 2025, with the final recommendations to be made in 2028.

=== National Audit on Group-based Child Sexual Exploitation and Abuse ===
In June 2025 Casey published the National Audit on Group-based Child Sexual Exploitation and Abuse.

Baroness Casey's review found that the true scale of group-based child sexual exploitation in England and Wales is impossible to gauge due to systematically poor data collection and an "appalling" failure to record perpetrators' ethnicity. The report calls for a full national inquiry, tougher laws treating all sex with under-16s as rape, mandatory recording of ethnicity and nationality in abuse cases, and the closing of taxi-licensing loopholes that enable exploitation.

In response, Prime Minister Keir Starmer announced that the British government accepted all of her report's recommendations in full, and would launch a full national statutory inquiry into the grooming gangs scandal. In October 2025, following public resignations from the inquiry's survivor panel and withdrawals by the two leading candidates for the inquiry chair, the Prime Minister announced that Casey would be appointed to support the work of the inquiry.

=== Social care ===
Casey is chair of the Independent Commission on Adult Social Care, which was launched on 29 April 2025. Prime Minister Andy Burnham asked her during July 2026 to bring forward the conclusion of the Commission's social care enquiry to 2027 and in doing so, "to focus on how the government could establish a National Care Service".

=== Other roles ===
Baroness Casey has a series of appointments, including:

- Ambassador, The Trussell Trust
- Trustee, King Charles III Charitable Fund
- A Vice-President, Local Government Association
- Co-founder and Chair, Advisory Group, Coronation Food Project
- Member, Advisory Board, Centre on Young Lives

== Honours ==
Casey was appointed a Companion of the Order of the Bath (CB) in the 2008 Birthday Honours and a Dame Commander of the Order of the British Empire (DBE) in the 2016 Birthday Honours for services to families and vulnerable people.

In the 2020 Special Honours, she was granted a life peerage as a crossbench peer, and was created Baroness Casey of Blackstock, of Finsbury in the London Borough of Islington, on 30 October 2020. She was introduced to the House of Lords on 13 September 2021.

In February 2013, Casey was assessed as one of the 100 most powerful women in the United Kingdom by Woman's Hour on BBC Radio 4.

She was elected fellow of the Academy of Social Sciences in 2023.

== Bibliography ==
- Casey, Louise. ""Engaging Communities in Fighting Crime: A Review by Louise Casey"" (PDF). (987 KB). Cabinet Office. June 2008; accessed 6 September 2011.
