= Sisters Uncut =

British feminist direct action group

- Founded: November 2014
- Type: Activist group
- Purpose: Anti-austerity, feminism, intersectionality, domestic violence, transfeminism, and working class feminism
- Location: United Kingdom
- Method: Demonstration, direct action, civil disobedience, and community work
- Website: http://www.sistersuncut.org

Sisters Uncut describe themselves as a British feminist direct action group that is opposed to cuts to UK government services for domestic violence victims. It was founded in November 2014, and came to international prominence in October 2015 for a protest on the red carpet at the London premiere of the film Suffragette. The group identify as revolutionary feminists and police and prison abolitionists, and is open to women (including trans and intersex women), non-binary, agender and gender variant people. The group aims to organise non-hierarchically and uses consensus decision-making. Sisters Uncut originated in London but has regional groups throughout the UK including Manchester and Leeds.

== Background and founding ==
Under the UK Coalition government of 2010 to 2015, funding for domestic violence services was cut dramatically, leading to concern from groups such as the Women's Aid Federation of England that the cuts could leave victims of abuse with no ability to escape their abusers. Sisters Uncut was founded in November 2014 in response to these concerns. The group was founded by women from the anti-austerity direct action group UK Uncut, and its name is a reference to that group.

== Positions ==
Sisters Uncut is a feminist organisation, and it engages in direct action to attain its goals. They have been described as "an anti-abuse campaign group". The organisation opposes putting undercover police in bars and clubs.

Sisters Uncut takes the position that the criminalisation of prostitution puts sex workers in more danger. They also oppose the Nordic model in which only buyers of sex are prosecuted, believing that it reduces customers and income to sex workers.

Shon Faye describes Sisters Uncut as a "feminist organisation fighting for better provision for women in domestic violence".

== Activism ==
The group has become known for high-profile direct action which highlights and challenges UK government policy that affects survivors of domestic and sexual violence. Protests by the group have included:

- A demonstration at the London Councils building on 4 May 2015 which included occupying the roof of the building to highlight the role of local councils in making cuts to domestic violence services.
- A protest outside the Daily Mail headquarters in Kensington in August 2015; the group burned copies of the newspaper in the street to protest what they described as"anti-migrant propaganda". The paper had called for British troops to be sent to Calais refugee camps to stop migrants reaching the UK.
- Protests outside Yarl's Wood Immigration Removal Centre to demand an end to immigration detention and an end to abuse of migrant women that takes place inside of them.
- A high-profile protest at the 7 October 2015 London premiere of the 2015 film Suffragette against cuts to domestic violence services. Their tagline was "Dead women can't vote". The film's star Helena Bonham-Carter described the protest as "perfect.. If you feel strongly enough about something and there's an injustice there you can speak out and try to get something changed". Carey Mulligan, another actress who performed in the film, said that the protest was "awesome" and that she was sad she had missed it.
- Dying the fountains in Trafalgar Square red to symbolism the blood of women who are murdered at the hands of abusive partners, in an action timed to coincident with the 2015 Autumn Budget.
- Protests against cuts to local domestic violence services, including a protest in a Portsmouth Council meeting where the group disrupted the meeting by releasing 4,745 pieces of confetti to symbolise the number of recorded instances of domestic violence in Portsmouth in 2014. This was to protest a planned £180,000 of cuts to domestic violence services by the council. This protest led to one arrest.
- Taking over an empty council home in Hackney, East London from July - September 2016 to highlight the urgent need for safe and secure housing for victims of domestic violence.
- Blocking bridges in Bristol, London, Glasgow and Liverpool to coincide with the 2016 Autumn Statement. The group argued that by cutting services, the government were "blocking bridges to safety" for domestic violence victims.
- In May 2017, taking over a building on the former site of Holloway Prison, demanding that the land be used for a women's centre and social housing.
- A protest on the red carpet at the British Academy Film and Television Arts Awards in February 2018 against the government's planned Domestic Violence and Abuse Bill, which they argued would actually harm victims by increasing criminal justice powers rather than funding support services.
- The delivery of 30,000 pieces of paper which blocked the doors to the Crown Prosecution Service in Westminster, highlighting the CPS policy of frequently demanding that the police download the data from the mobile phones of sexual violence victims, a process which focuses on the investigation of victims instead of their abusers. The offices were subsequently evacuated. The action coincided with Max Hill QC's first day in post as the head of the CPS in November 2018.
- Ad-Hacking London Tube posters replacing adverts with poems from women & non-binary people who have been silenced by the state. The poems share real stories of how government cuts and ‘hostile environment’ policies have left victims locked up in prison, locked out of refuges, and locked in violent relationships.
- Following the death of Sarah Everard in March 2021, Sisters Uncut helped organise a number of vigils and protests, both to mourn the death and to protest against violence against women, specifically by the police force.
- The group opposes the Police, Crime, Sentencing and Courts Bill.
- The group was central to the early organising within the Kill the Bill movement.
- In the later months of 2021, Sisters Uncut announced the launch of the national CopWatch Network: an abolitionist network of police intervention groups.
- In March 2022, to mark the one year anniversary of the Clapham Common Vigil, Sisters Uncut set off 1000 rape alarms outside Charing Cross police station in protest of police violence against women. They demanded the public withdraw consent from British policing.

== See also ==
- Anti-austerity protests
- Disabled People Against Cuts
- UK Uncut
