= Respect agenda =

Prominent policy of Tony Blair

The Respect agenda was launched in September 2005 by Tony Blair, then Prime Minister of the United Kingdom. Tony Blair described it as being about "putting the law-abiding majority back in charge of their communities". Its aim was to help central government, local agencies, local communities, and citizens to tackle anti-social behaviour collaboratively and more effectively.

In late December 2007, shortly after Gordon Brown succeeded Blair as prime minister, it was reported that the government had effectively ended the Respect programme by closing down the Respect Task Force and moving its head to another job inside the Cabinet Office. However, much of the Respect Agenda was incorporated into a Youth Taskforce Action Plan in the Department for Children, Schools and Families.

== Respect Task Force ==
The agenda was co-ordinated by the Respect Task Force, a cross-governmental unit based at the Home Office. Louise Casey, former director of the Anti-Social Behaviour Unit, headed the Task Force.

== Respect Action Plan ==
The key policies of the Task Force were published in the Respect Action Plan in January 2006. The report advised tackling the underlying causes of anti-social behaviour, intervening early where problems occur and broadening efforts to address other areas of poor behaviour.

== Anti-social behaviour ==
The agenda promoted a range of tools including Anti-Social Behaviour Orders (ASBOs), Parenting Orders, Family Intervention Projects and Dispersal Orders. The Task Force claimed use of a combination of the available tools can be effective when tackling the problem, although ASBOs have encountered some controversy.
