= Reclaim These Streets =

British social justice organisation

- Formation: 2021
- Leader: Jessica Leigh, Anna Birley, Henna Shah and Jamie Klingler
- Website: https://reclaimthesestreets.com/

Reclaim These Streets (RTS) is a social justice organisation movement in the UK. The organization has the motto: We aim to use legislation, education and community action to ensure no woman has to be asked to “Text Me When You Get Home” again. It exists as a hashtag #ReclaimTheseStreets. RTS raises funds for ROSA a feminist charity in the UK that is named for three human rights champions Rosa Luxemburg, Rosa May Billinghurst, and Rosa Parks. As well as speaking out about feminist topics, RTS speaks out about policing issues, internet harassment, neighbourhood safety, and the right to protest in the street.

Jessica Leigh, Anna Birley, Henna Shah and Jamie Klingler of Reclaim These Streets took legal action against the Metropolitan Police Service, claiming that their human rights to freedom of speech and assembly had been breached in connection with their attempt to organise a vigil in Clapham Common, London, for the murdered Sarah Everard.

RTS had attempted to organise a vigil and informed the police. RTS were told they would be liable to be issued with a fixed penalty notice by the Metropolitan Police Service if the protest went ahead. Though the vigil was cancelled by RTS, many members of the public went to Clapham Common to pay their respects to Sarah Everard. Attendees included Catherine, Princess of Wales.

RTS sought a judicial review of the decision-making by the Metropolitan Police. The case was heard in January 2022, and a judgment delivered on 11 March 2022 said that the Met's decisions in the run-up to the event were “not in accordance with the law”. The Met were found to have ignored their duty to inform themselves of the considerations relevant to decision-making, their "Tameside duty of inquiry". The Met said it would appeal the judgment. In April 2022, the High Court refused to grant the Met permission to appeal. In April 2022, the Met applied to the Court of Appeal for permission to appeal against the judgment of the High Court. The Court of Appeal declined permission.

In 2021, RTS co-founder Jamie Klingler campaigned to "close loopholes" that led to an account impersonating her on Instagram not being investigated by police. It has 40,000 followers on Twitter as of April 2022.

== Criticism ==
In an opinion piece in gal-dem, the journalist Diyora Shadijanova has criticised Reclaim These Streets, the approach it took to the Sarah Everard vigil, and its actions afterwards, as examples of divisive liberal feminism which stands in contradistinction to groups such as Sisters Uncut. Notably, RTS sought to cancel the vigil rather than go ahead with it in opposition to the police; framed it as a vigil rather than a protest; refused to countenance criticism of the Metropolitan Police Commissioner Cressida Dick because she is a woman.
