= Murder of Sarah Everard =

2021 murder in England

- Location: Kent, England
- Date: c. 4 March 2021 (Note: Everard was kidnapped on the evening of 3 March and was likely murdered in the early hours of 4 March)
- Attack type: Murder by strangulation, rape, kidnapping
- Victim: Sarah Everard
- Perpetrator: Wayne Couzens
- Convictions: Murder, kidnapping, rape
- Sentence: Life imprisonment (whole life order)

On the evening of 3 March 2021, 33-year-old Sarah Everard was kidnapped in South London, England, as she was walking home to the Brixton Hill area from a friend's house near Clapham Common. She was stopped by off-duty Metropolitan Police constable Wayne Couzens, who identified himself as a police officer and handcuffed her. He drove Everard to Kent, where he raped and strangled her before burning her body and disposing of her remains in a pond in woodland.

On 9 March, Couzens was arrested in Deal, first on suspicion of Everard's kidnapping, and then a day later on suspicion of her murder. Everard's remains were discovered in a densely wooded area near Ashford on 10 March; following their identification, Couzens was charged with her kidnapping and murder.

Vigils were held for Everard on the evening of 13 March. The vigil on Clapham Common, near where she had been kidnapped, led to a controversial police response and four arrests for breaches of COVID-19 regulations. The murder gave rise to widespread debate about the role of police in British society and women's safety in the UK.

On 8 June, Couzens pleaded guilty to Everard's kidnapping and rape. On 9 July, he pleaded guilty to her murder. On 30 September, he was sentenced to life imprisonment with a whole life order.

A public inquiry chaired by Lady Elish Angiolini KC was commissioned to investigate how Couzens was permitted to serve as a police officer despite an extensive history of alleged sexual offences. The first part of the report, published in February 2024, found that Couzens had a history of alleged sexual offending and that failings in the vetting process allowed him to become a police officer.

== Background ==
=== Sarah Everard ===
Sarah Everard
- Born: 1987; Surrey, England
- Disappeared: 3 March 2021
- Died: c. 4 March 2021
- Cause of death: Compression of the neck
- Body discovered: Hoad's Wood, near Ashford, Kent
- Education: St Cuthbert's Society, Durham University (2005–2008)
- Occupation: Marketing executive

Sarah Everard was born in Surrey in 1987. She grew up in York, where she attended Fulford School. She studied Human Geography at St Cuthbert's Society, Durham University, from 2005 to 2008. At the time of her death, Everard lived in the Brixton Hill area and worked as a marketing executive for a digital media agency.

=== Wayne Couzens ===
Wayne Couzens was born in Dover, Kent, on 20 December 1972. He was educated at Castlemount School, and after taking GCSEs worked as a mechanic in his family's garage. He enlisted as a private with the Territorial Army in 2002, and over the following four years he unsuccessfully applied to become a police officer three times. He joined Kent Police as a special constable in 2006, and was discharged from the Territorial Army the following year for failing to fulfil training obligations.

In late 2010, Couzens was vetted for recruitment to the Civil Nuclear Constabulary (CNC). In early 2011 he resigned from Kent Police, and took up the role of an authorised firearms officer with the CNC. He transferred to the Metropolitan Police in September 2018, working as a police constable and firearms officer. In February 2020, Couzens was assigned to the Parliamentary and Diplomatic Protection (PaDP) branch, the division responsible for uniformed protection of government and diplomatic premises. Couzens had not undergone enhanced vetting as part of his recruitment, nor had he gone through the mandatory two-year probation period with the Met before joining PaDP.

== Incident and investigation ==
On 28 February 2021, Couzens booked a white Vauxhall Crossland from a vehicle hire company in Dover. At 07:00 GMT on 3 March, he completed a 12-hour shift at the US Embassy in London before travelling to Kent to collect the hire car. He then drove back to London where he was recorded as being in Earl's Court and on Battersea Bridge. After arriving in Clapham, he again drove to Earl's Court before returning to Clapham at 21:23.

At around 21:00, Everard left a friend's house on Leathwaite Road near Clapham Junction, west of Clapham Common. She walked along the A205 South Circular Road across the common en route to her Brixton Hill home. She spoke to her boyfriend on her phone for about 15 minutes and agreed to meet him the next day. At 21:28, she was seen on doorbell camera footage on Poynders Road and four minutes later on the dashcam of a passing police car.

At 21:34, Couzens, who had parked the Vauxhall on the pavement outside Poynders Court, stopped Everard and showed her his police warrant card before handcuffing her. The trial judge later said that he had probably claimed that he was arresting her for having breached COVID guidelines. Couzens and Everard were twice captured by bus CCTV; the first instance at 21:35 showed them beside the hired Vauxhall and the second, at 21:38, showed the Vauxhall's number plate. Around this time, Couzens and Everard entered the car and Couzens drove to Kent; the route of the car was retrospectively tracked using CCTV and automatic number-plate recognition.

By 23:43, Couzens and Everard were in Dover and had transferred to Couzens's personal SEAT car. Between 23:53 and 00:57 on 4 March, Couzens's mobile phone connected to cell sites in the Shepherdswell area; it is believed that he raped Everard at some point between midnight and 01:45. At 02:34, Couzens purchased drinks from a Dover petrol station; it is likely that he had strangled Everard using his police duty belt by this time. Couzens then drove to Hoad's Wood near Ashford, where he owned a plot of land. His car was captured on CCTV in the area between 03:22 and 06:32 before driving back to Dover to switch back into his rental car before returning it at 08:26. After Couzens returned the hire car, he drove his personal car to Sandwich, Kent, disposing of Everard's mobile phone in one of the town's watercourses at 09:21. Later that day, Everard's boyfriend contacted the police after she did not meet him.

In the days after the murder, Couzens told senior colleagues that he was suffering from stress and no longer wanted to carry a gun. On 5 March, shortly after 11:00, Couzens bought and filled a petrol container at a service station in Whitfield. He then returned to Hoad's Wood, where his car was captured on CCTV at 12:37, and burned Everard's body inside a refrigerator. At 13:47 he bought two large builder's bags from B&Q before returning to Hoad's Wood on 7 March, where he used one of the bags to dispose of Everard's remains in a pond. On 8 March, he reported himself ill from work, handing in his equipment including his police belt and handcuffs.

At 16:20 on 10 March, police searching Hoad's Wood found human remains in a large builder's bag, approximately 100 metres (330 ft) from Couzens's plot. Police in Dover also searched the site of a former body repair garage, previously owned by Couzens's family, at the top of the White Cliffs. On 12 March, Everard's body was identified through dental records. Two days later, police focused a search operation around The Rope Walk in Sandwich, and cordoned off approximately one square mile (2.6 km^{2}) of the town. On 16 March, police continued to comb woodland in Kent and police divers in Sandwich searched underwater for Everard's mobile phone.

Everard's funeral took place on 22 May at Heslington Church in Heslington, near York.

The results of a post-mortem held at William Harvey Hospital in Ashford were released on 1 June. It concluded that Everard had died from compression of the neck.

== Legal proceedings ==
=== Arrest of Wayne Couzens ===
On 9 March 2021, Couzens was arrested at his home in Deal on suspicion of kidnapping. Police arrived at his house at 17:45 and arrested Couzens at 19:47. Around 40 minutes before he was arrested, Couzens tried to wipe the data from his mobile phone. When interviewed, he claimed initially not to recognise Everard after being shown a photograph of her. He then claimed to be having financial problems after paying for sex in Folkestone, and that a gang of Eastern Europeans had threatened him and his family, demanding he deliver "another girl" after underpaying a prostitute a few weeks before. A woman in her thirties was also arrested at the address on suspicion of assisting an offender but subsequently released without charge.

On 10 March, the day Everard's remains were discovered, Couzens was re-arrested on suspicion of murder. On 11 March, Couzens was hospitalised following a head injury sustained in custody; he was again briefly hospitalised the following day after a similar injury. After the incident on 11 March, police said the injury was sustained while he was alone in his cell.

Couzens was charged with Everard's kidnapping and murder on 12 March, following authorisation from the Crown Prosecution Service. He appeared at Westminster Magistrates' Court on 13 March and was remanded in custody before appearing at the Old Bailey via video link from Belmarsh Prison on 16 March.

=== Guilty plea ===
On 8 June 2021, Couzens pleaded guilty to kidnap and rape, and admitted responsibility for Everard's death. Pending medical reports into his mental health at the time of Everard's death, Couzens did not enter a plea on the charge of murder.

At a hearing on 9 July, Couzens pleaded guilty to murder. On video link from Belmarsh Prison, he kept his head down and was shaking slightly. After the plea hearing, it was reported that Kent Police had received a report in 2015 of a man in a car in Dover, naked from the waist down. It was believed there may have been enough information recorded in the Kent police system to have identified the man as Couzens, who was a serving police officer at the time. Speaking outside the Old Bailey, Cressida Dick, the Commissioner of the Metropolitan Police at the time, said she felt "sickened, angered and devastated" by Couzens's crimes, adding: "They are dreadful and everyone in policing feels betrayed. Sarah was a fantastic, talented young woman with her whole life ahead of her and that has been snatched away."

=== Sentencing and imprisonment ===
The sentencing hearing before Lord Justice Fulford, began at the Old Bailey on 29 September 2021 following medical and psychiatric reports. Couzens's barrister, Jim Sturman QC, asked Fulford to consider imposing a life sentence with a determinate tariff which would allow Couzens to become eligible for release on licence in his 80s. On 30 September, Couzens was sentenced to life imprisonment with a tariff of a whole life order, with Fulford justifying the severity of the punishment by saying that Couzens's use of his position as a police officer to detain Everard was the "vital factor which in my view makes the seriousness of this case exceptionally high".

In October 2021, it was reported that Couzens was applying for leave to appeal against his sentence. In July 2022, his appeal against his whole-life sentence was rejected by the Court of Appeal.

As of December 2021, Couzens was imprisoned at HM Prison Frankland in County Durham. In March 2022, Couzens was further charged with four counts of indecent exposure related to alleged incidents in January and February 2021. In February 2023, Couzens pleaded guilty to three incidents of indecent exposure that took place in Kent in 2020 and 2021. A further three counts were ordered to lie on file.

In November 2022, two of Couzens's colleagues—PC Jonathon Cobban and former PC Joel Borders—were jailed for multiple counts of sending grossly offensive messages on a public communications network. Cobban and Borders were part of a WhatsApp group chat with Couzens and another officer where they sent racist, homophobic, misogynistic, and ableist messages.

In April 2023, it was reported that Couzens could be entitled to a police pension worth £7,000 (equivalent to £7,314 in 2025) a year. Mayor of London, Sadiq Khan, who had successfully applied to have Couzens stripped of his Metropolitan Police pension, said he might still be entitled to pensions from his pre-Met service.

== Angiolini Inquiry ==
Couzens's crimes led to a non-statutory inquiry headed by Lady Elish Angiolini into how he was permitted to work as a police officer for three separate forces despite his behaviour causing concern. In February 2024, Angiolini's report said that Couzens had a history of alleged sexual offending, that he should never have been a police officer, and that multiple forces missed "red flags" during his vetting processes. The report said his crimes were "the culmination of a trajectory of sexually motivated behaviour and offending", and made sixteen recommendations designed "to ensure that everything possible is being done to prevent those entrusted with the power of the office of constable from abusing that power."

Following the inquiry, Home Secretary James Cleverly announced that police officers charged with "certain offences" (Note: Cleverly did not specify which offences) would be automatically suspended from duty. The government had already announced in 2023 that officers found guilty of the disciplinary charge of "gross misconduct" would also be subject to automatic suspension.

== Responses ==
On 11 March 2021, the Home Secretary, Priti Patel, released a statement saying that "every woman should feel safe to walk on our streets without fear of harassment or violence", and Sadiq Khan stated that London streets are not safe for women or girls. Patel announced that new laws are being considered to protect women against sexual harassment in public, including the potential of making public harassment a specifically defined crime.

On 16 July, the Metropolitan Police held an in-camera disciplinary hearing at which Couzens was dismissed from the service with immediate effect. The Met later announced that it would stop deploying lone plain clothed officers.

=== Role of police ===
The case sparked debate surrounding the role of police in UK society and police violence. The police were criticised both for their crackdown on vigils for Everard during the COVID-19 lockdown and for their failure to prevent the murder: not only did Kent Police not take any action after an alleged incident of indecent exposure in 2015, but Couzens had faced at least two other accusations of indecent exposure that had not been properly investigated and he had been involved in an incident in 2002 that was missed in his vetting. In early October 2021, it was reported that Couzens's colleagues had once been forced to call him back to the station from patrol after a prostitute had visited the station demanding money from him. In mid-October, it was reported that police were investigating claims that Couzens had sexually assaulted a drag queen at a pub in Deal in 2018. Radio presenter Emma B also came forward to say that she had attempted to report Couzens in 2008, after he exposed himself to her in an alley in Greenwich, but that the police had laughed at her.

Police culture in the UK also came under criticism. An officer who had been a part of the search for Everard was suspended from duties after sharing an inappropriate graphic on social media, five officers were placed under investigation for sharing grossly offensive material with Couzens before he committed the murder, and several officers were criticised for giving character references for Couzens during his sentencing hearings. Several female officers told the press that they did not feel as if they could report concerning behaviour by male colleagues.

The Independent Office for Police Conduct (IOPC) launched an investigation into whether two officers had responded appropriately to reports from 28 February that Couzens had indecently exposed himself at a branch of McDonald's in Swanley, Kent; he had been questioned about these allegations days before he was accused of Everard's murder. The IOPC also reported that it was investigating whether Kent police had properly investigated allegations of indecent exposure against Couzens made in 2015, when he was employed as an armed officer by the Civil Nuclear Constabulary. On 9 July, the IOPC announced that it had served 12 misconduct notices on officers in regards to the investigation.

On 30 September 2021, after Couzens's sentencing, the Met stated that people should consider "shouting out to a passer-by, running into a house, knocking on a door, waving a bus down or, if you are in the position to do so, calling 999" if they felt uncomfortable when being stopped by a single police officer. The Met received criticism for the statement, with commentators arguing that this would not have prevented Everard's murder (as Couzens was a police officer with the power to make arrests), and could also leave people facing charges of resisting arrest. North Yorkshire Police, Fire and Crime Commissioner Philip Allott faced calls to resign and was criticised for victim blaming after suggesting similarly, stating that women needed to learn more about the law and needed to be "streetwise about when they can be arrested and when they can't be arrested." Following a unanimous vote of no confidence on 14 October, Allott initially refused to resign, stating that he wished to "rebuild trust and confidence in [his] work as commissioner". That afternoon, he announced his resignation and apologised for his remarks.

The British government also came under criticism for its response to the murder, notably for proposing extra powers and funding to the police, which critics took issue with as Couzens was a police officer. The government had announced it would spend an additional £25 million on street lighting and CCTV cameras as well as launch a pilot scheme to send undercover police into bars and clubs, and was advancing the Police, Crime, Sentencing and Courts Bill before Parliament, which would give police broad authority to place restrictions on protests and public assembly. Cressida Dick faced calls to resign.

After Couzens's sentencing, direct action group Sisters Uncut announced that they would be launching "Copwatch" groups across the UK to train people to intervene in stop and searches and other potentially dangerous police arrests. The Guardian stated in an editorial that "there is no sign that the Met understands the profound crisis of faith that it faces", pointing to a tribunal case related to the UK undercover policing relationships scandal that was resolved in the same week as Couzens's sentencing.

On 4 October 2021, Dick announced that the Met would launch a review of professional standards and internal culture, writing, "I hope to announce a high-profile figure will be appointed to lead a review of our professional standards and internal culture. They will look at our training, leadership, processes, systems and standards of behaviour, and examine cases where officers have let the public down. This person will also work alongside me, challenging my senior team and our leadership on standards, corruption, sexual misconduct and how the Met responds when things go wrong." On 3 October, Prime Minister Boris Johnson stated that the government would not undertake an immediate public inquiry into the case; Patel later announced that an inquiry would investigate the "systematic failures" in allowing Couzens to continue working as a police officer following the incidents of reported indecent exposure. The police force announced Baroness Casey of Blackstock would lead an independent enquiry in which the Metropolitan Police's recruitment, training and vetting would be examined. A second enquiry would investigate cases where allegations of sexual misconduct or domestic abuse were made against police officers or members of staff, who still work in the force.

A YouGov poll released in November 2021 found that 76% of women believed police culture had to change and 47% of women had decreased trust in the police following Everard's murder.

Simon Kempton, a police officer on secondment to the Police Federation, shared information about Couzens's defence with other police officers via social media messages. Kempton had received the information from a journalist who had witnessed Couzens's trial via video link, and passed it on to Kempton before it could legally be published. Kempton was found guilty of professional misconduct "concerning respect and courtesy" and given a final written warning valid for two years.

On 23 May 2023, Samantha Lee, a former Metropolitan Police officer who was assigned to investigate two counts of indecent exposure committed by Couzens in the days prior to Sarah Everard's murder, was found guilty of gross misconduct for failing to properly investigate the incidents following a disciplinary hearing. Lee subsequently told BBC News she believed she had been made a "scapegoat" for wider issues within the Metropolitan Police Service.

On 15 November 2024, Myles McHugh, a serving Metropolitan Police officer, was dismissed for gross misconduct after having viewed confidential files related to Everard's murder without good cause. A tribunal also found Hannah Rebbeck and Mark Harper guilty of gross misconduct for the same reason. Rebbeck had already left the force but would have been dismissed if she were still serving. Harper was given a final written warning.

=== Women's safety ===
The case led to widespread debate about women's safety and violence against women in the UK. After the murder, the British government reopened its public consultation on its violence against women and girls (VAWG) strategy, receiving an additional 160,000 responses in two weeks. However, some feminist campaigners argued that not enough changed in the wake of the murder. Andrea Simon of the End Violence Against Women Coalition stated that "the measures that could make a difference and the resourcing are not where they need to be." Reports of women killed by serving or former police officers in the UK since 2009 indicate that they are usually partners, unlike in this case. On 17 September 2021, Her Majesty's Inspectorate of Constabulary and Fire & Rescue Services published a report commissioned by the government after the murder, finding "inconsistencies at every level in how the police respond to VAWG and victims" and that there needed to be a "radical refocus and shift in the priority given to VAWG offences".

On 9 October 2021 it was reported that BT chief executive Philip Jansen had outlined plans for Walk Me Home, a phone service designed to protect lone women as they walk home. The service would allow users to be tracked using GPS, and send out alerts to emergency contacts and the police if they did not arrive at their destination when expected. The service would be activated by dialing a number, with 888 proposed as the number users would need to call. The proposal was supported by Home Secretary Priti Patel. As of June 2022, the service had yet to be implemented, nor had a timeframe for its implementation been released. In April 2023, BT confirmed that the proposed service had been cancelled.

Jennifer Grant, criminologist at the University of Portsmouth, stated that studies suggest that up to 10% of men who commit indecent exposure later commit physical sexual offences, and that if indecent exposure was taken seriously there would have been an opportunity for intervention with Couzens prior to Everard's murder. Fiona Vera-Gray, deputy director of the child and woman abuse studies unit at London Metropolitan University, said that because of the underreporting of indecent exposure, criminal justice statistics do not accurately demonstrate its prevalence and most offenders are not convicted. Like Grant, Vera-Gray highlighted connections between non-contact and contact offending, saying that society and the criminal justice system "need[s] to do more to understand that the thinking process of the mind of somebody who would drive around and expose themselves is very similar to the thinking process of someone who then would later go on to abduct, kidnap, rape or murder somebody".

== Vigils ==
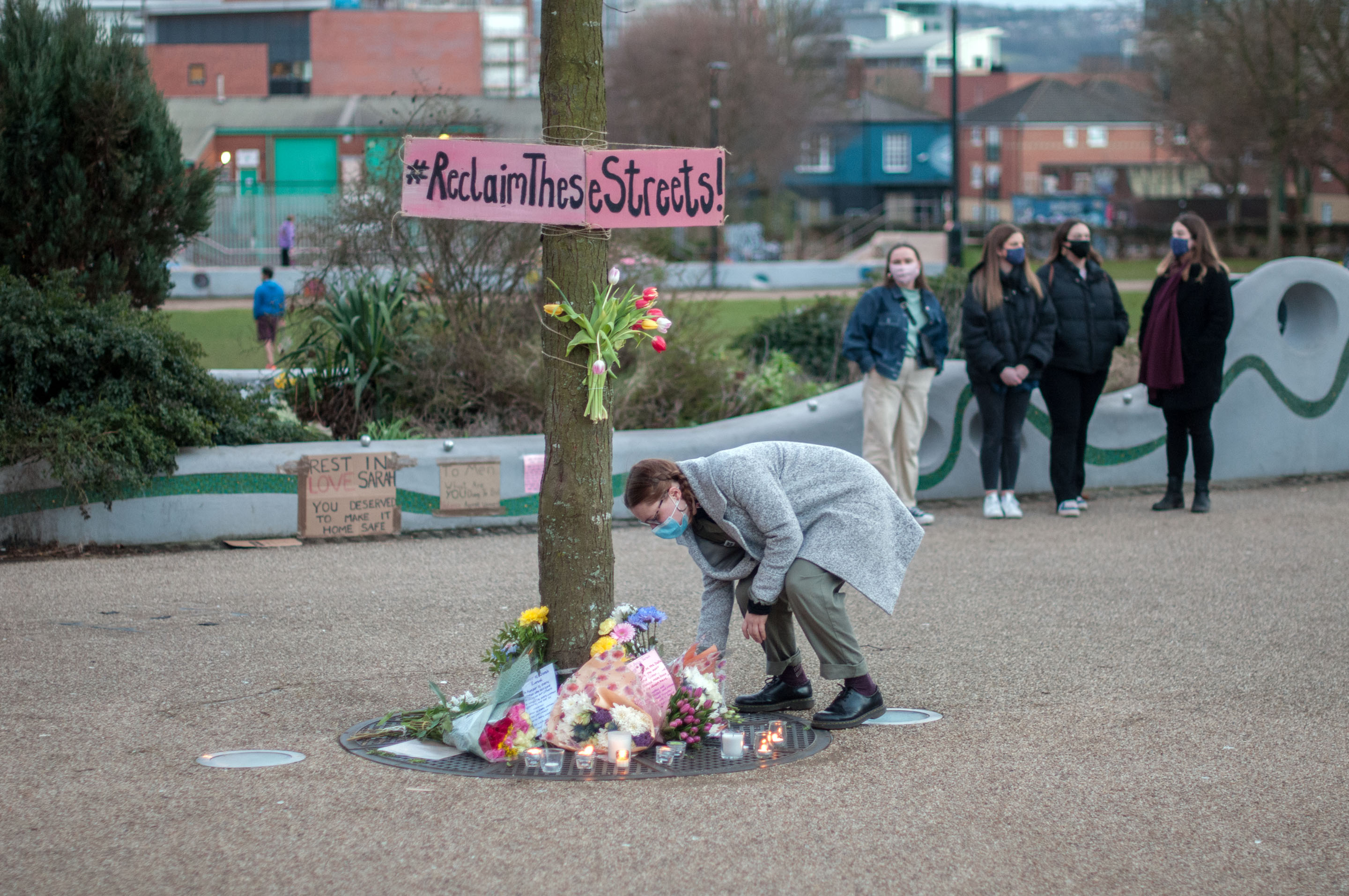
Flowers were laid at a vigil for Everard in Sheffield.

Country-wide vigils to be held on Saturday, 13 March 2021 were organised by a newly formed campaign group, Reclaim These Streets. The day before the vigils were due to take place, a message was sent to all police chiefs that made it clear that, because of the COVID risk, Patel wanted them to stop people gathering at vigils; she also promised she would personally urge people not to gather. Talks between organisers and police broke down; The police had advised the organisers that it would be considered an illegal gathering under COVID‑19 pandemic restrictions and the court refused a request to intervene in the police decision. Events planned for Edinburgh and Cardiff were officially cancelled in favour of online events. Cambridge also was scheduled to go online.

Vigils still took place in several cities, including Birmingham, Bristol, Cardiff, Edinburgh, Leeds, Nottingham, Liverpool and Sheffield. Small gatherings also took place at locations in London. One on Highbury Fields attracted about 50 participants. Another in Russell Square, although also officially cancelled, saw a few people lighting candles. Camden councillor Angela Mason and others criticised the police handling of this small vigil, which included asking attendees and a local journalist to leave to comply with COVID-19 mass-gathering regulations.

=== Clapham Common vigil ===
A vigil for Everard took place on Clapham Common on 13 March 2021. Throughout the early part of the day, hundreds of people attended to pay their respects. Catherine, Duchess of Cambridge, attended, with Kensington Palace releasing a statement saying that the Duchess "remembers what it was like to walk around London at night before she was married". She was later reported to have sent a personal letter to Everard's family to express "her sadness and sympathy".

The direct action group Sisters Uncut encouraged people to attend "with your sadness and your rage". By 18:00, a crowd of several hundred had congregated at the park's bandstand to hear speeches from Sisters Uncut. Four people were arrested for public-order offences and for breaching the Coronavirus Act 2020.

The Metropolitan Police's decision to break up the crowd, and the arresting of attendees and the trampling of the flowers they had laid, prompted public anger. Sir Keir Starmer, the leader of the Labour Party, called the police response "deeply disturbing"; Boris Johnson said he was "deeply concerned" by footage of the events. Khan called the police actions and arrests "neither appropriate nor proportionate". Sir Ed Davey, the leader of the Liberal Democrats, repeated calls for Dick to resign. Dick declined and dismissed criticism of the police response. Assistant Commissioner Helen Ball said the action was necessary because "hundreds of people were packed tightly together, posing a very real risk of easily transmitting COVID-19", and the Metropolitan Police Federation said that 26 police officers were assaulted.

Khan and Patel directed Her Majesty's Inspectorate of Constabulary and Fire & Rescue Services (HMICFRS), which oversees the police, to conduct a review of the policing of the vigil and lessons learned. The review, published on 30 March 2021, found that the police had "reacted appropriately and were not heavy handed" and were "justified" in their stance with respect to the COVID regulations, saying that the risks of transmission were "too great to ignore". The HMICFRS report also said "Condemnation of the Met's actions within mere hours of the vigil—including from people in positions of responsibility—was unwarranted, showed a lack of respect for public servants facing a complex situation, and undermined public confidence in policing based on very limited evidence." They also said that the police response was a "public relations disaster" with a "materially adverse effect on public confidence in policing"; the review added, "We acknowledge that a more conciliatory response might have served the force's interests better." HMICFRS also concluded that the Met had incorrectly interpreted coronavirus-related restrictions due to legal confusion, and that not all demonstrations during a Tier 4 lockdown are unlawful. A whistleblower alleged that the reviewers had demonstrated a pro-police and anti-protestor bias while compiling the report, with the reviewing panel composed almost entirely of police officers.

On 14 March 2021, more than 1,000 people marched from New Scotland Yard to Parliament Square. The police response was described as "hands-off" and "markedly different" to that on 13 March.

Four members of Reclaim These Streets took legal action against the Metropolitan Police, claiming that their human rights to freedom of speech and assembly had been breached in connection with their attempt to organise the vigil. The case was heard in January 2022, and a judgment delivered on 11 March 2022 said that the Met's decisions in the run-up to the event were "not in accordance with the law". In April 2022, the High Court refused the Met permission to appeal the judgment. The refusal was upheld by the Court of Appeal at a second application.

In June 2022, the Met announced that it would be prosecuting six people who had attended the vigil for breaking COVID-19 laws. On 10 June, three of them were fined £220 each and each ordered to pay £134 in costs when tried in absentia in a behind-closed-doors trial. The hearings for the other three were due to take place later that month. In August 2022, the Crown Prosecution Service discontinued the prosecutions. One of those originally convicted announced that she would be pursuing a civil claim against the Met, as did Patsy Stevenson, who was handcuffed and held down by two male officers at the vigil. On 14 September 2023, it was announced that the Metropolitan Police had apologised and paid damages to the women, which their solicitor described as "substantial". In March 2024, the Metropolitan Police agreed to pay £10,000 in damages to Jennifer Edmunds, a woman arrested at the Clapham Common Vigil and detained overnight on the charge of breaching Covid restrictions.

== In popular culture ==
A documentary on Everard's killing and the aftermath of her death, Sarah Everard: The Search for Justice, was aired on BBC One on 5 March 2024. Created with the consent of the Everard family, the documentary featured previously unreleased photos of Sarah Everard. The documentary featured the lead investigating officer, DCI Katherine Goodwin, speaking publicly for the first time. There was also footage from police body camera of Couzens's arrest and of his interviews in police custody.

Wayne Couzens: Killer in Plain Sight, a documentary on Wayne Couzens and the wider culture of misogyny and sexual violence within the Metropolitan Police, was broadcast by Channel 5 on 15 June 2023. The documentary alleges that Couzens could have been tipped off by a fellow officer, factory resetting his phone 35 minutes before detectives questioned and arrested him at his home on 9 March 2021.

On 31 March 2026, the BBC announced a two-part factual drama series about Everard's murder written by Jeff Pope. Pope said that the series would deal with how the poor vetting that allowed Couzens to serve as a police officer, despite his record of sexual offences, had created a "tragedy waiting to happen". Director of BBC Drama Lindsay Salt promised that the series would treat the subject "with the utmost care" and that the production was in contact with Everard's family. The BBC's decision to commission a man to write the story was criticised by a group of female screenwriters who signed an open letter to the BBC.

== See also ==
- List of prisoners with whole life orders
- List of solved missing person cases (2020s)
- Murder of Susana Morales, an American case concerning a 16-year-old girl who was similarly kidnapped and murdered by a police officer
