= Naomi Westerman =

British playwright and author

Naomi Jane Westerman
- Born: London, England
- Education: University College London

Naomi Westerman is a British playwright, and author.

== Early life and education ==
Westerman was born and raised in London. Her parents divorced when she was young. She spent time homeless as a teenager after being abused by her mother's live-in boyfriend. Westerman's mother, prior to passing away under suspicious circumstances, managed to protect the family assets with a hidden will naming Westerman as the beneficiary.

Westerman was home schooled, and attended university as a mature student, gaining a joint honours BA in Anthropology and Journalism, and two MSc degrees, in Anthropology and in Applied Neuroscience. She began a PhD in Neuroanthropology but did not complete her studies.

== Career ==
Westerman wrote her first play in 2015, the feminist comedy-drama Tortoise, about three women living on a locked NHS psychiatric hospital ward. The play was adapted from Westerman's MSc dissertation on the gendering of mental illness and systemic misogyny within the psychiatric industry. Tortoise debuted at the New Wolsey Theatre as a one-act play, and was then developed into a full-length play via the Criterion Theatre New Writing Programme, where it received a showcase performance. The play then transferred to the Arcola Theatre, and was later shortlisted for several awards.

Westerman's second major play Puppy was a lesbian romantic comedy which debuted at Vault Festival, where it was highlighted in pick of the week columns in Time Out and the Guardian.

Westerman was then commissioned by the Graeae Theatre Company to write the dystopian drama Brenschluss, which debuted at the Curve Theatre and was a finalist in the Theatre Uncut Political Playwriting Award, held at the Young Vic Theatre.

In 2018, Westerman was chosen from more than 800 writers by playwright and screenwriter James Graham, to be part of the writers' room for his collaboratively written stage play Sketching which debuted at Wilton's Music Hall.

In 2019, Westerman moved to Berlin to take up an artistic residency with Wapping Berlin Arts.

In 2020 (having returned to the UK) Westerman was commissioned by Chronic Insanity (the UK's leading digital theatre company) to create an interactive theatre piece titled The Ashes World Tour. The following year Chronic Insanity received Arts Council England support to fund the creation of a literary department and fund five full-length play commissions, choosing Westerman as the recipient of their inaugural commission. The resulting play Batman debuted at Vault Festival where it garnered 5* press reviews and won the Vault Origin Award, later transferring to the Nottingham Playhouse before touring both nationally and internationally. In summer 2025, Batman was selected for inclusion in the Malawi International Theatre Festival in Lilongwe, Malawi.

In 2021, Westerman became writer-in-residence in Exeter, and was also chosen as one of eight writers for Hampstead Theatre Writing the Bigger Picture programme, co-writing a play under head writer Mike Bartlett.

In 2022, she won a Royal Society of Literature Award, and was subsequently nominated for Fellowship by current RSL Fellow James Graham.

In November 2023, Westerman was commissioned by the Bush Theatre to write a film in response to the October 7 attacks, exploring Hamas' use of rape as a terror weapon, the rise in antisemitism, and the need to decry racism in all forms. The film, titled Barbra Streisand, was released in May 2025.

Her 2017 play Puppy, a queer political comedy about two women who meet and fall in love while dogging and go on to found a feminist porn company, had a four-week revival run at the King's Head Theatre in April 2025, starring Ashling O'Shea and Ian Hallard.

In November 2025, Westerman became one of Regent's Park Open Air Theatre's resident artists.

== Books ==
In 2023, publisher 404 Ink announced that they had signed Westerman to a publication deal to write her first non-fiction book, a collection of personal and anthropological essays exploring death, grief and bereavement. Her book Happy Death Club was published in May 2024. Her book received positive reviews in the British and Irish press, though some reviews critiqued the book's left wing political agenda, and the book's "irreverent" tone.

In 2025, American publishing House Saraband Publishing announced they had acquired the North American rights to Happy Death Club with the book due to be published in the USA and Canada in autumn 2025.

Westerman is represented by the Curtis Brown Literary Agency.

== Activism ==
Westerman is involved in disability and mental health activism work.

Westerman is the co-organiser of the "National Inclusive Theatre Day", an annual event for children and young people with Special Educational Needs held in partnership with the National Theatre. Westerman won a Royal Society of Literature award recognising her work in championing disabled people in theatre.

Westerman is a longtime member of Disabled People Against Cuts, and has marched and spoken at DPAC protests. In 2016 she performed at an illegal street theatre event created by DPAC outside Downing Street, and was later invited to 10 Downing Street to present a DPAC petition to then Prime Minister David Cameron. In 2017, she co-created a piece of platform theatre exploring disabled people's experiences with the disability benefits system, which was performed at a disability conference, and then for an invited audience of politicians and other experts working on a government white paper on disability benefits.

In 2023, Westerman wrote a series of articles for the Guardian newspaper on the link between female chronic pain and chronic illness, and systemic medical misogyny. In October 2023, she was invited to be keynote speaker at a Cancer Research UK conference, discussing how systemic medical misogyny leads to an overlook of gynaecological cancers.

In 2024, Westerman was invited to join Mayor of London Sadiq Khan's Liberty Advisory Group, advising the Mayor's office on issues related to disability access and the arts.

In 2025 Westerman was invited to become an NSPCC Ambassador, making her first appearance at a reception at the Houses of Parliament in March 2025.

In September 2025, she presented a panel at the British Science Association's annual British Science Festival, talking about new technologies in death.

== Recognition and honours ==
- Unlimited Emergy Artist Award, for beneFIT (won)
- Relish Theatre Award, for Puppy (won)
- Vault Origin Award, for Batman (won)
- Royal Society of Literature Award, for Cripligraphy (won)
- Michael Grandage Futures Bursary Award, for Untitled Welsh Drama (won)
- Derby Theatre In Good Company Mid-Career Commission Award, or Best Days of Our Lives (won)
- Raindance Film Festival, Ammo Live for Maturity (won)
- Theatre Uncut Political Playwriting Award, for Brennschluss (finalist)
- Bread and Roses Award, for Puppy (runner up)

== Work ==
=== Plays ===
- Tortoise (Premiered at the New Wolsey Theatre as a one-act play, before performances at the Criterion Theatre and the Arcola Theatre.)
- Claustrophilia (Vault Festival.)
- Double Infemnity (Vault Festival. Co-written with Catherine O'Shea and Jennifer Cerys)
- Fallout (St James Theatre)
- 563 Days (Southwark Playhouse)
- Sugar Babies (High Tide / St James Theatre)
- Stories from my Mother (Royal Court Theatre, as part of Primetime/Open Court)
- Brenschluss (Commissioned by Graeae Theatre Company, and premiered at Curve.)
- Mischpoche, or Ruth and Ethel (Commissioned by Graeae Theatre Company, and premiered at Birmingham Rep before transferring to a run off-Broadway. Spent two years touring the US and Canada.)
- The Wild Tides of Clíodhna (Commission from Strange Days Theatre, premiered at the Scottish Storytelling Centre.)
- Puppy (Premiered at Vault Festival, staged at the Women's Playwriting Conference in Santiago, Chile. 2025 revival at the King's Head Theatre.)
- James Graham's Sketching (Wilton's Music Hall. One of eight co-writers collaboratively written under head writer James Graham)
- Unicorn (Commission from the Bush Theatre)
- 800 Weeks (Ink Festival)
- DINK (Pleasance Theatre)
- Batman aka Naomi's Death Show (Vault Festival/Nottingham Playhouse.)
- The Best Days of Your Life (Commission from Derby Theatre.)
- Untitled Women of the Wars of the Roses play

=== Screenwriting ===
- Maturity (Feature film, winner, Raindance Film Festival)
- We Found Love in a Hopeless Place (short film)
- HOLD (short film, winner National Film School Short Film Script competition)
- BIKE (short film)
- Who Holds the Line (TV movie, contributing writer)
- Woof Woof (Interactive digital theatre piece commissioned by Homotopia Arts, a sequel to the stage play Puppy)
- The Ashes World Tour (Interactive web series commissioned by Chronic Insanity)
- Batman (Short film, adapted from the stage play. In pre-production with Our Daughter Productions)
- Sandwiches Commissioned by Cardboard Citizens for their More Than One Story series.
- Fantastic Cadaver (feature film produced by Butthead Films)

=== Books ===
- Happy Death Club (2024) - 404 Ink, Edinburgh
- Quay Words (2023) - Customs House, Exeter
- Bridging the Gap - Penguin Random House
