= Murder of Garry Newlove =

2007 murder case in England

Garry Newlove (5 November 1959 – 12 August 2007) was an English man beaten to death in August 2007 in the UK. His murder caused anger in the UK over the two offenders who had been underage drinking. Chief Constable of the Cheshire Constabulary Peter Fahy called for the legal age of buying alcohol to increase to the age of 21 as a result of the Garry Newlove murder. His widow Helen Newlove condemned the Government for failing to get to grips with youth disorder afterwards.

== Victim ==
Garry Newlove was born in Salford, on 5 November 1959, the youngest of three children born to Thomas Edward Newlove (1913–1979) and his wife Ellen (1919–2002). He was married to Helen Marston from 1986 until his death, and had three daughters who were born between 1989 and 1994.

He was diagnosed with stomach cancer in August 1992 and made a full recovery from surgery to have his stomach and spleen removed.

By 2007, he was living in Padgate, Warrington, and was working as a sales manager for a local plastics company.

== Incident and arrests ==
Newlove was attacked outside his house in Station Road North in the Padgate district of Warrington, Cheshire, on the evening of 10 August 2007, having gone outside to confront a gang of youths he suspected of vandalising his wife's car. He died in hospital in the early hours of 12 August 2007, less than 36 hours after the attack.

The murder was the culmination of numerous incidents of anti-social behaviour by youth gangs in and around Padgate, which had started several years earlier.

Nine suspects were quickly arrested, and three were charged with his murder on 14 August 2007 and remanded in custody. A fourth teenager was charged and remanded the next day and the fifth and final suspect was charged and remanded on 13 September 2007.

Adam Swellings, 19, from Crewe, went on trial at Chester Crown Court charged with the murder on 14 November 2007, along with two 17-year-olds, a 16-year-old and a 15-year-old who for legal reasons could not be named.

== Verdicts and aftermath ==
On 16 January 2008, Adam Swellings was convicted of the murder of Garry Newlove, along with 17-year-old Stephen Sorton and 16-year-old Jordan Cunliffe. The two other defendants were cleared of any involvement in the killing and walked free from court. Swellings, Sorton and Cunliffe were remanded in custody until being sentenced to life imprisonment on 11 February 2008. The trial judge recommended that Swellings, Sorton and Cunliffe should serve minimum terms of 17, 15 and 12 years respectively – sentences which were widely described as lenient by the victim's family and friends, as well as the tabloid media – as these sentences meant that the youngest of the three killers could be out of prison by the age of 28, and the oldest was likely to be paroled in his mid thirties.

Garry Newlove's murder was one of a number of high profile, widely reported murders in the United Kingdom during the late 2000s which highlighted the rise of crime involving youth gangs. Other comparable murders around the same time which attracted national attention were the murders of Tom ap Rhys Pryce (2006), Sophie Lancaster (2007), Rhys Jones (2007), Jimmy Mizen (2008) and Ben Kinsella (2008), all of which were committed by teenagers.

After the trial, Garry Newlove's widow Helen Newlove campaigned through the media for more support for victims of crime, for more severe sentences for criminals, as well as working with communities and working to reduce crime. In the Dissolution Honours of 2010, for her work Helen was awarded a Peerage, styled Baroness Newlove. In 2023 she was appointed Victims Commissioner for England and Wales by the UK Government. Appointed on 16 October 2023, Baroness Helen Newlove was named as the interim Victims' Commissioner for England and Wales for a one-year term, later extended to 31 December 2025: she died following a short illness on 11 November 2025.

== Appeals ==
Swellings and Sorton appealed against their convictions and sentences. Their case was heard at the Court of Appeal on 13 November 2008. Swellings lost the appeal against his conviction and sentence, although Sorton won a two-year reduction on his minimum sentence.

Cunliffe later appealed against his murder conviction on the grounds that he had not taken part in the attack on Mr Newlove, although he had been present when it happened. On 26 July 2010, the Court of Appeal dismissed his appeal. His mother later questioned his murder conviction, claiming he could barely see the attack taking place due to a degenerative eye condition.

== Parole ==
In December 2019, the Parole Board recommended that Jordan Cunliffe (now aged 28) should be released from prison. On 14 May 2020, it was reported that Cunliffe had been denied parole following reports that he had held an alcohol-fuelled party in his prison cell at an open prison to celebrate his impending release. As a result, and pending further consideration, he was returned to closed conditions in another prison.

Cunliffe was eventually paroled in September 2020. This decision was challenged by the Secretary of State but that appeal was dismissed on 23 October 2020.

In February 2020, the Parole Board also recommended that Stephen Sorton (now aged 29) should be released from prison. He is believed to have been paroled the following month.

In April 2022, the Parole Board recommended that gang ringleader Adam Swellings be moved to an open prison with day release provisions. However, the move was blocked by Justice Secretary Dominic Raab.

== Popular culture ==
The screenwriter Jimmy McGovern later used the case of Jordan Cunliffe as a basis for a new television drama. Common was shown on BBC One on 6 July 2014.

== See also ==
- John Cannan, another infamous murderer (and suspected killer of Suzy Lamplugh) who died on 6 November 2024.
- Patrick Mackay, a British serial killer who is now eligible for release from prison
