= Victims' Commissioner =

UK independent government agency

Commissioner for Victims and Witnesses
- Incumbent; Claire Waxman since January 2026
- Appointer: Justice Secretary; after consultation with Attorney General and Home Secretary
- Constituting instrument: Domestic Violence, Crime and Victims Act 2004, s 48(1)
- Inaugural holder: Dame Louise Casey
- Deputy: None
- Salary: £108,000
- Website: https://victimscommissioner.org.uk/

The office of the Victims' Commissioner for England and Wales (formally the Commissioner for Victims and Witnesses) is an independent agency of the government of the United Kingdom sponsored by the Ministry of Justice. The role of the Victims' Commissioner is to promote the interests of victims and witnesses of crime, encourage good practice in their treatment, and regularly review the Code of Practice for Victims which sets out the services victims can expect to receive.

The organization was created, and its role and remit defined, under sections 48 to 53 of the Domestic Violence, Crime and Victims Act 2004 as amended by section 142 of the Coroners and Justice Act 2009. The Secretary of State for Justice is responsible for appointing the Commissioner, after consulting the Attorney General and Home Secretary. The Commissioner must publish a report on the organization's work each calendar year.

Louise Casey, a former charity director, was appointed as the first Victims' Commissioner in 2010, following the one-year appointment of Sara Payne as Victims' Champion. Her successor was Baroness Newlove, a Warrington-based community reform campaigner, who was appointed in 2012. The Commissioner appointed in May 2019, and in office from June 2019 to September 2022, was Dame Vera Baird. Newlove was reappointed as interim Commissioner in October 2023. She died whilst in office in November 2025 at the age of 63, following a short illness. Subsequently, Claire Waxman was appointed as Victims' Commissioner and commenced the role in January 2026.

== List ==
Name		Portrait	Term of office	
1	Dame Louise Casey		30 March 2010	12 October 2011
2	The Baroness Newlove		21 December 2012	31 May 2019
3	Dame Vera Baird		15 June 2019	30 September 2022
(2)	The Baroness Newlove (acting)		16 October 2023	11 November 2025
4	Claire Waxman		4 January 2026	present
