= Helen Newlove, Baroness Newlove =

British anti-violence campaigner (1961–2025)

The Right Honourable The Baroness Newlove
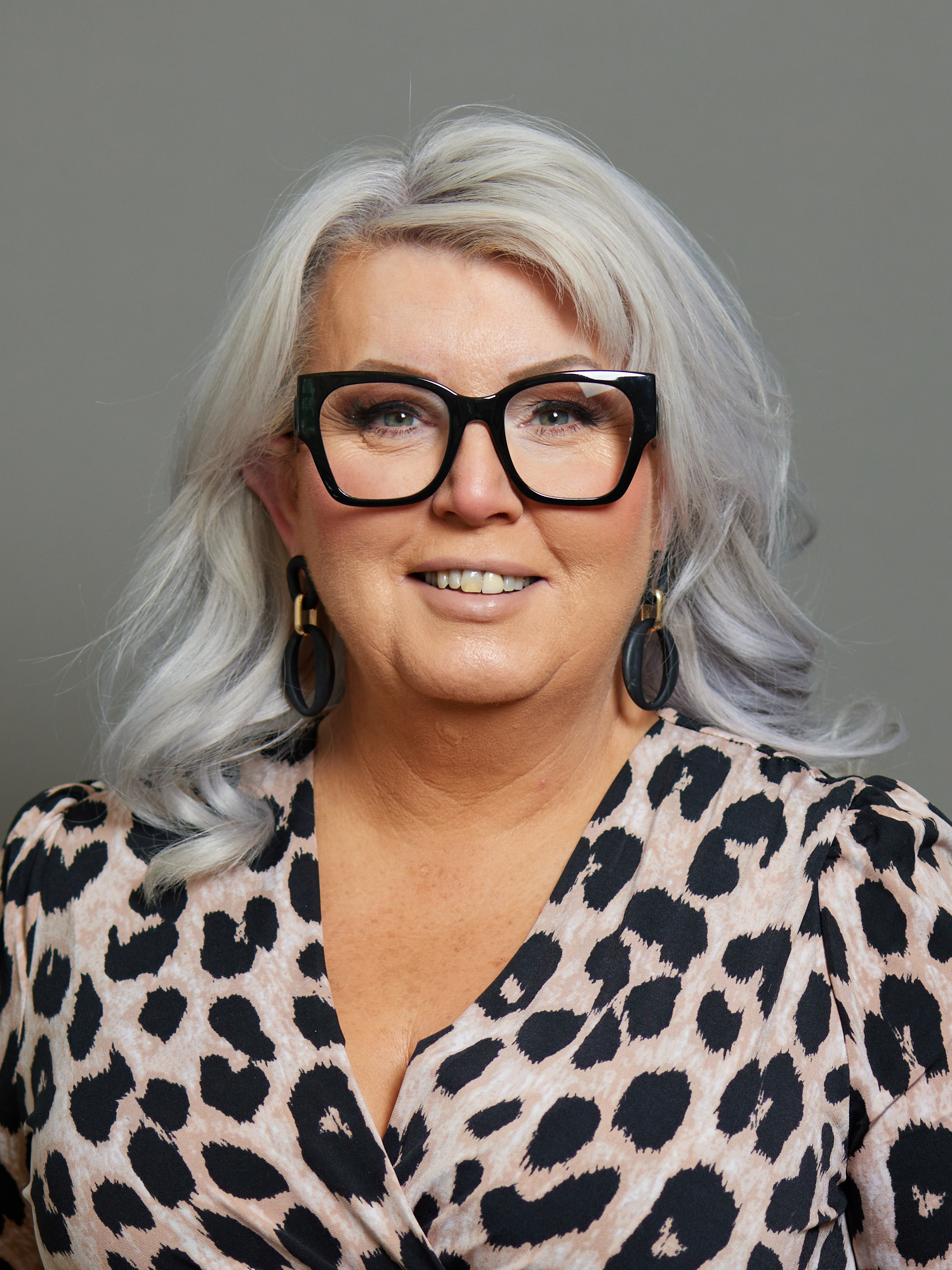
- Official portrait, 2022

Victims' Commissioner for England and Wales
- Interim
- In office 16 October 2023 – 11 November 2025
- Appointed by: Alex Chalk
- Prime Minister: Rishi Sunak; Sir Keir Starmer
- Preceded by: Dame Vera Baird
- Succeeded by: Claire Waxman
- In office 4 March 2013 – 31 May 2019
- Appointed by: Kenneth Clarke
- Prime Minister: David Cameron; Theresa May
- Preceded by: Louise Casey
- Succeeded by: Dame Vera Baird

Deputy Speaker of the House of Lords
- In office 5 March 2018 – 11 November 2025

Member of the House of Lords
- Lord Temporal
- Life peerage 14 July 2010 – 11 November 2025

Personal details
- Born: 28 December 1961 Salford, Lancashire, England
- Died: 11 November 2025 (aged 63)
- Party: Conservative
- Spouses: Garry Newlove (m. 1986; died 2007) Paul Shacklady (m. 2012)
- Children: 3

Helen Margaret Newlove, Baroness Newlove (née Marston; 28 December 1961 – 11 November 2025) was a British community reform campaigner who was appointed Victims' Commissioner and served from 2013 to 2019. She was reappointed the interim victims' commissioner on 16 October 2023, serving until her death in 2025. She also served as a deputy speaker in the House of Lords from 2018 to 2025.

Newlove came to prominence after her husband, Garry Newlove, was murdered by three youths in 2007. After his death she set up a number of foundations that aimed to tackle the UK drinking culture as well as providing support to young people. Newlove was given a peerage in the 2010 Dissolution Honours list and sat in the House of Lords as a Conservative.

== Early life ==
Newlove was born in Salford, Lancashire, on 28 December 1961. She took a secretarial course at St Helens College and became a typist at Manchester magistrates' court. After marrying in 1986 and taking time out to start a family, she returned to work as a legal secretary.

== Campaigns ==
Newlove's 47-year-old husband Garry Newlove was murdered in August 2007 in Warrington, Cheshire, after confronting a gang of drunken youths who were vandalising her car – the culmination of a long-running campaign of youth gang crime in the Padgate area of the town. Five months later, three local teenagers were found guilty of murdering Garry Newlove, who died in hospital 36 hours after being assaulted outside his house. They were sentenced to life imprisonment with recommended minimum terms of between 12 and 17 years. Two other suspects, also teenagers, were tried for the murder and found not guilty.

Witnesses estimated that around ten people were involved in the attack on Garry Newlove, and most or all of them had been involved in earlier incidents of vandalism. One of the three teenagers found guilty of the murder had been released on bail hours earlier after appearing in court charged with assaulting another man in the local area.

After her husband's death, Helen Newlove campaigned against the UK's binge drinking culture and callied for better training for landlords and bar staff, as well as shop workers involved in the sale of alcohol. She more prominently campaigned to clamp down on the sort of criminal activities which contributed to the death of her husband, campaigned for stiffer sentences for serious offences, and campaigned for improved support for victims of crime – highlighting the lack of support that she and her family received after the murder, and highlighting the lack of support given to many other victims of crime (ranging from the families of murder victims to families who have been bereaved by road accidents).

On 8 November 2008, Helen Newlove set up Newlove Warrington, which aims to make the town a safer and better place for people to live and to improve facilities and opportunities for the children through education and life skills for the better of communities. The three goals for the campaign were to inspire people to lead a more purposeful life; motivating people to enrich their lives; providing opportunities for positive interaction with communities.

Newlove extended her campaign nationally by joining forces with the local and national media.

== Peerage ==
In May 2010, Newlove was given a peerage in the 2010 Dissolution Honours list. After the announcement was made Newlove commented that "I am just an ordinary woman, propelled into high profile by a set of horrifying circumstances which I wish with all my heart had never occurred." Newlove took up her seat in the House of Lords as a Conservative on 15 July 2010 when she was introduced as Baroness Newlove, of Warrington in the County of Cheshire.

On 5 March 2021, Newlove took up the office of Deputy Speaker of the House of Lords.

== Victims' Commissioner ==
On 21 December 2012, it was announced that Newlove had been appointed the second Victims' Commissioner, a role requiring her to liaise with ministers to offer advice on aspects of the criminal justice system in England and Wales that affect victims and witnesses. The role had previously been held by Louise Casey, but had been vacant since she stepped down in October 2011. Newlove took up the post on 4 March 2013, was reappointed for a second term in March 2016, and stepped down on 31 May 2019. She was succeeded by Dame Vera Baird. It was announced that Newlove had been reappointed Victims' Commissioner from 16 October 2023; her tenure would have ended on 31 December 2025.

== Death ==
Newlove died following a short illness on 11 November 2025, at the age of 63.
