= Disabled People Against Cuts =

UK disability advocacy group

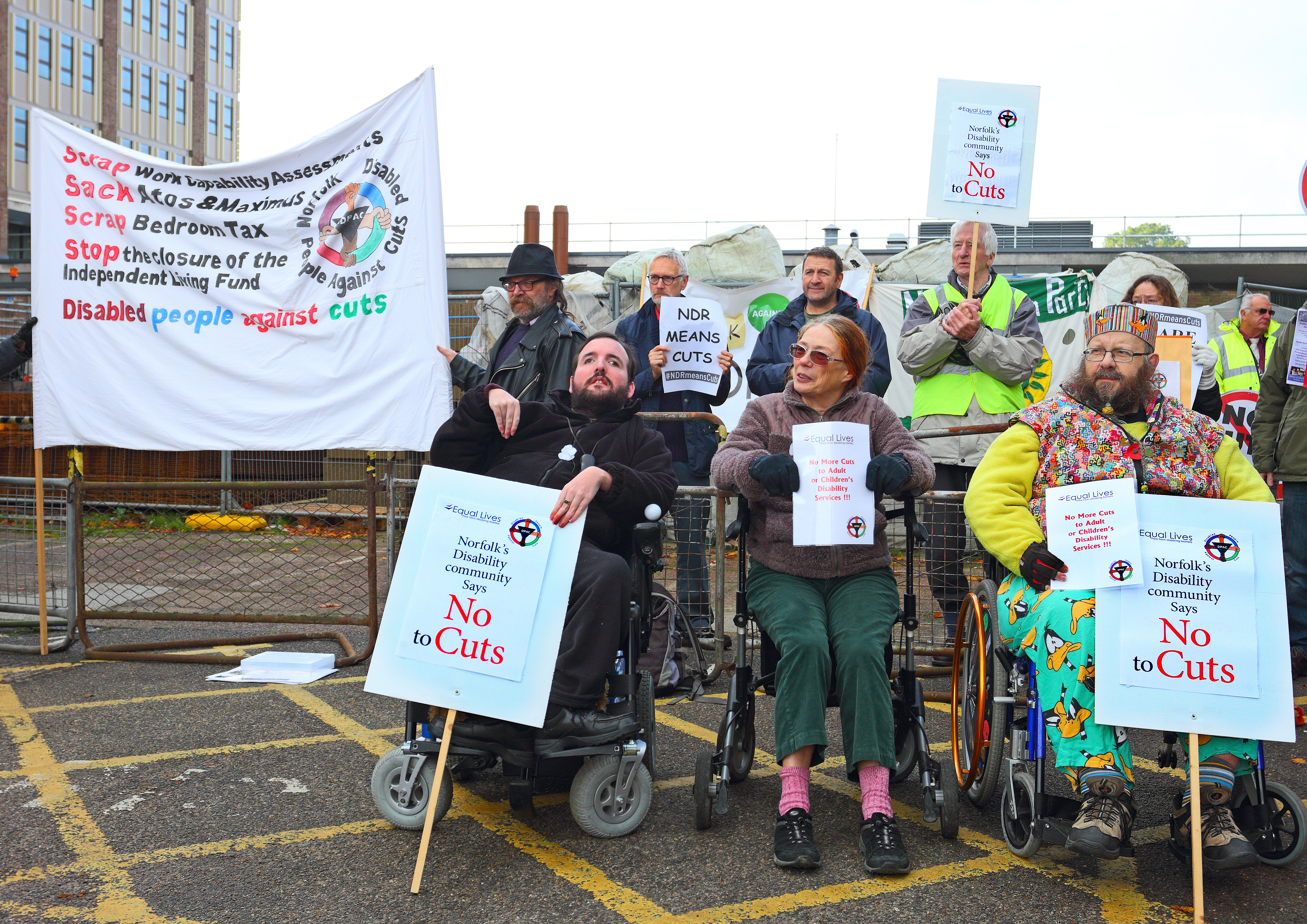
- Disabled People Against Cuts protest outside Norfolk County Hall in October 2015
- Abbreviation: DPAC
- Formation: 3 October 2010; 16 years ago
- Type: Advocacy group
- Website: dpac.uk.net

Disabled People Against Cuts (DPAC) is an organisation based in the United Kingdom for disabled people and allies to campaign against the impact of government spending cuts on the lives of disabled people. DPAC was formed in October 2010 and promotes full human rights and equality for all disabled people. DPAC operates from the social model of disability.

== History ==
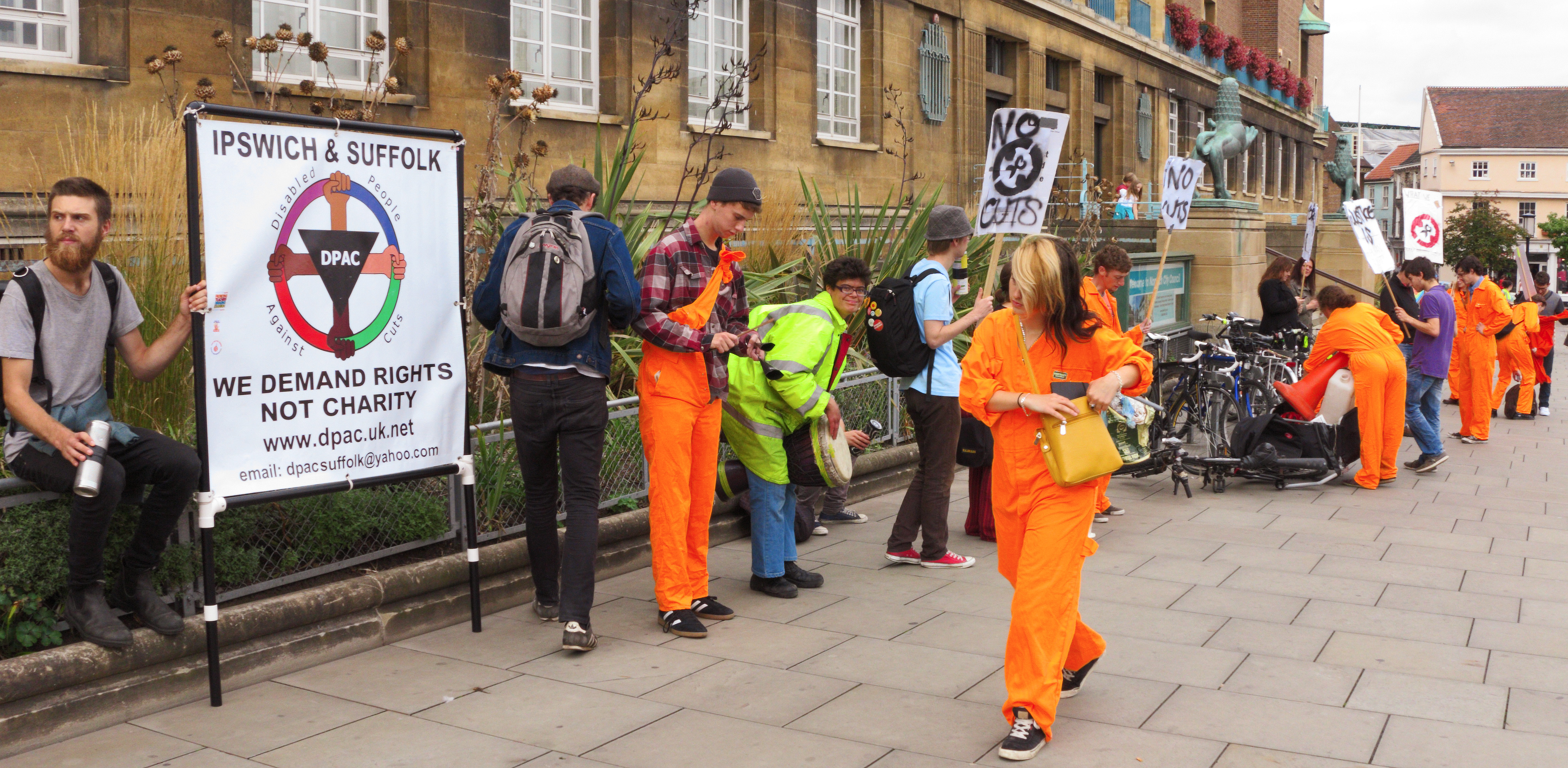
DPAC forming part of the protestors outside Norwich City Hall in October 2013 protesting against cuts to legal aid

A 'Disabled People Protest' demonstration took place outside the Conservative Party annual conference on 3 October 2010 in Birmingham. This was the first mass protest against the impact of austerity cuts on disabled people. It was led by disabled people, speaking out on their own behalf for themselves. Using this march as a catalyst, leading activists founded the organisation.

== Structure ==
DPAC is a non-hierarchical organisation which grew organically from a small group of people who came together to plan an anti-cuts march in Birmingham. The current steering group was elected at the 2011 conference.

There are 26 local DPAC groups, each one of which works within the DPAC constitution but are generally autonomous and their members make decisions for those groups.

DPAC currently has a formal membership of 1,500, with 2,500 members of the Facebook page and 4,500 followers on X. Online activism played a key role in the development of the group. DPAC developed an approach to social media that enabled greater numbers of people to take part.

=== Affiliations ===
DPAC is closely affiliated with its sister organisation Black Triangle in Scotland.

== Philosophy ==
DPAC operate from the social model of disability which sees disability as being created by the structures of society not the medical differences in a person's body. DPAC supports full citizenship for all disabled people and opposes all cutbacks and austerity measures which are currently adversely affecting disabled people nine times harder than non-disabled people.

== Issues ==
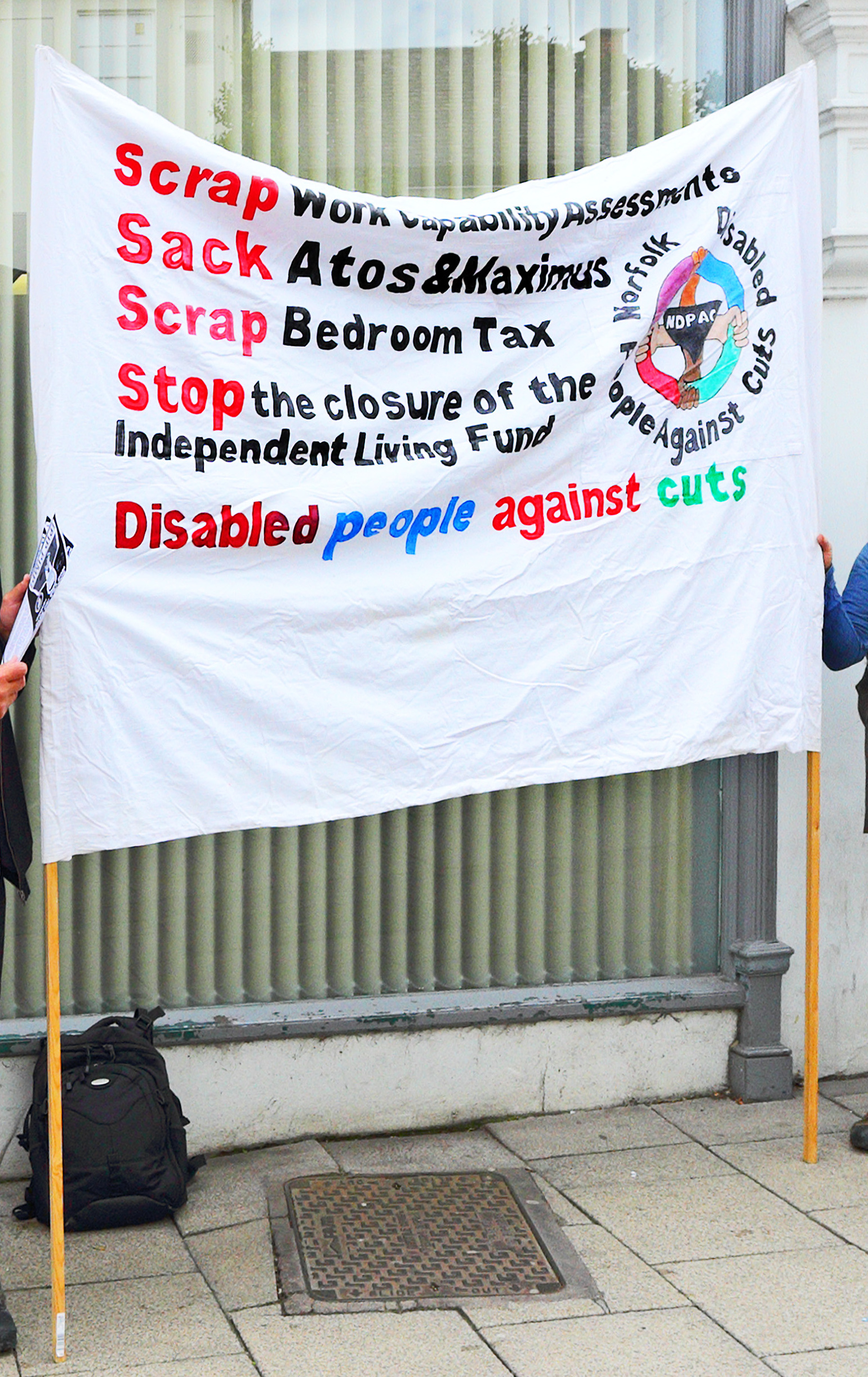
A DPAC banner

DPAC oppose all austerity measures which are currently heavily impacting disabled people in the UK. These include the closure of the Independent Living Fund, Personal Independence Payment (replacing Disability Living Allowance), Employment and Support Allowance, the Children and Families Bill 2013 and the 'bedroom tax'.

== Campaigns and actions ==
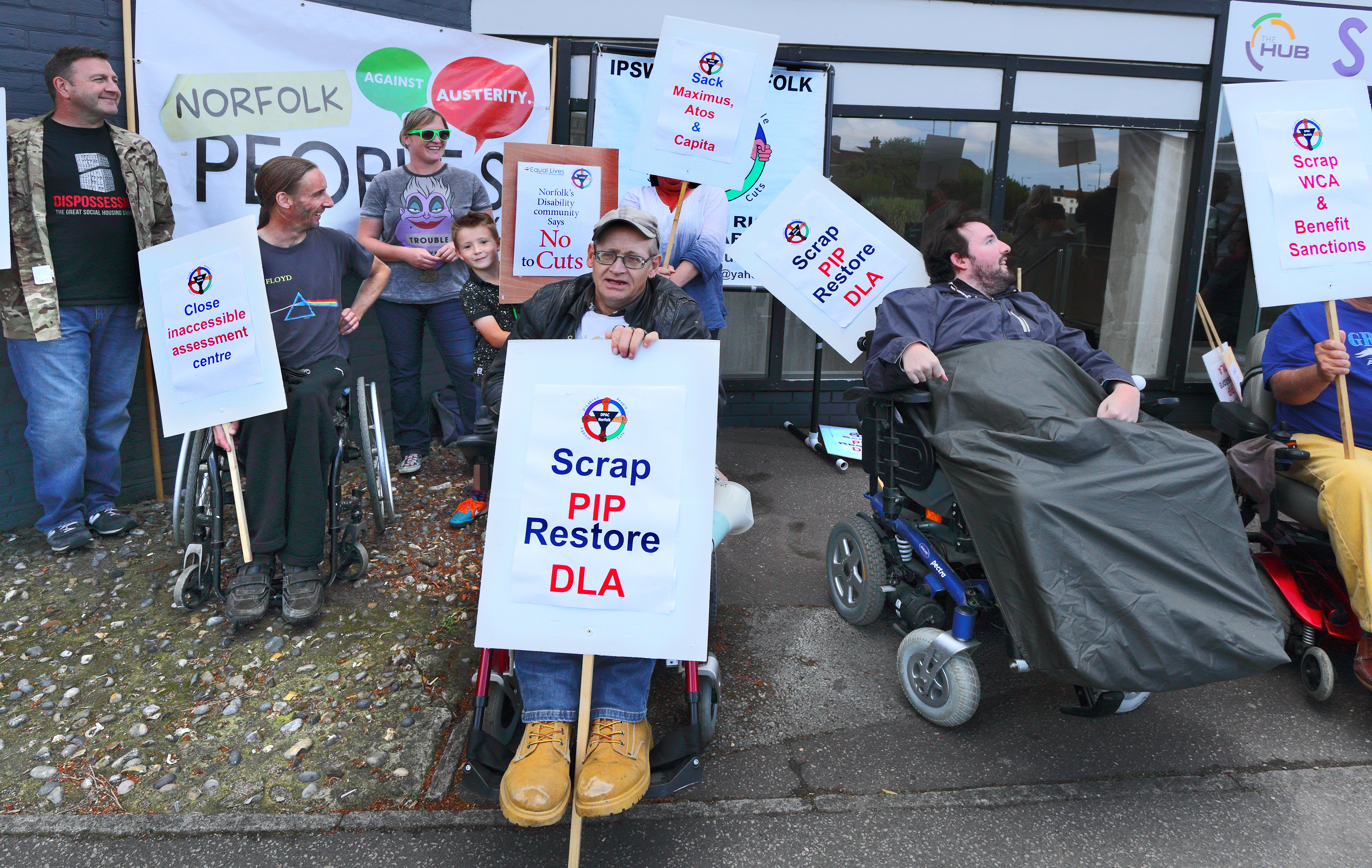
Norwich disability protest outside St Marys House, July 2016

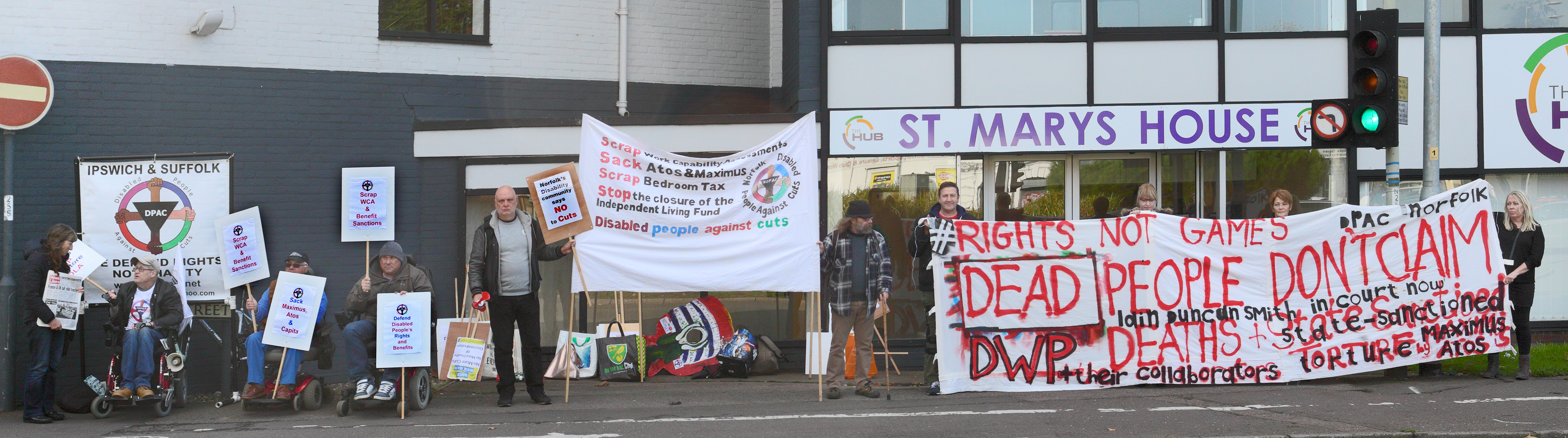
DPAC demonstrating with others for the restoration of the disability living allowance in October 2016

In a 2013 article in The Guardian, Ellen Clifford, of DPAC, explained the tactics used by the anti-cuts group. She said: "No one who cares about social justice can work with a government that is intent on dismantling the welfare state, so disabled activists are having to find other means to try to stop what is happening. Legal challenges to reforms are one part of that... But legal challenges aren't an answer in themselves, and, as a form of campaigning, need to be run alongside other forms of awareness-raising, lobbying, protests and direct action."

=== Civil disobedience actions ===
DPAC have carried out a number of civil disobedience actions. Actions have included a blockade of Regent Street in London, January 2012, with UK Uncut, a blockade of Trafalgar Square in April 2012, and a street blockade as part of a national trade union march in October 2012.

In August 2013, DPAC members took part in a 'Reclaim the Power' anti-fracking protest camp at Balcombe, West Sussex to engage with training in non-violent direct action, and emphasised the needs of disabled people for clean, affordable and sustainable energy.

On 24 June 2015, activists angered by the ending of The Independent Living Fund for disabled people were prevented from accessing the House of Commons chamber during Prime Minister's Questions. Members of Manchester DPAC chained their wheelchairs together to block the VIP entrance to the Conservative Party Conference in October 2015. In September 2016, DPAC protesters closed down Westminster Bridge for several hours to bring attention to deaths arising from government welfare 'reforms'. In July 2017, the lobby of Parliament was occupied and the main entrance to the Commons chamber blocked, accompanied by chants of "No justice, no peace".

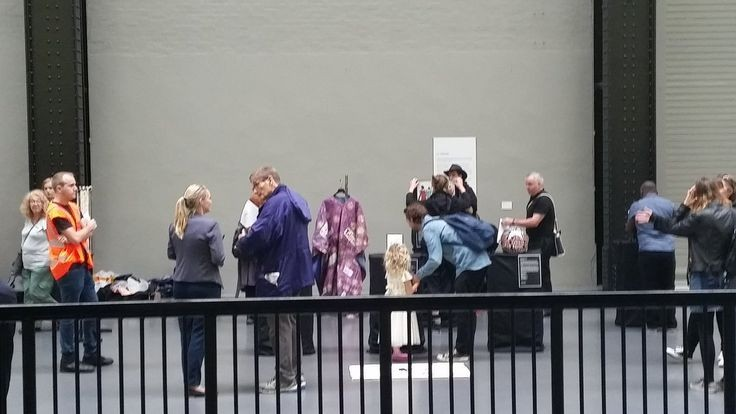
The Turbine Hall, Tate Modern, London. As part of the 2016 Week of Action, DPAC activists set up an unscheduled "pop up gallery" of artworks by disabled people. The art highlighted the experiences of disabled people dealing with the welfare system.

=== Week of Action ===
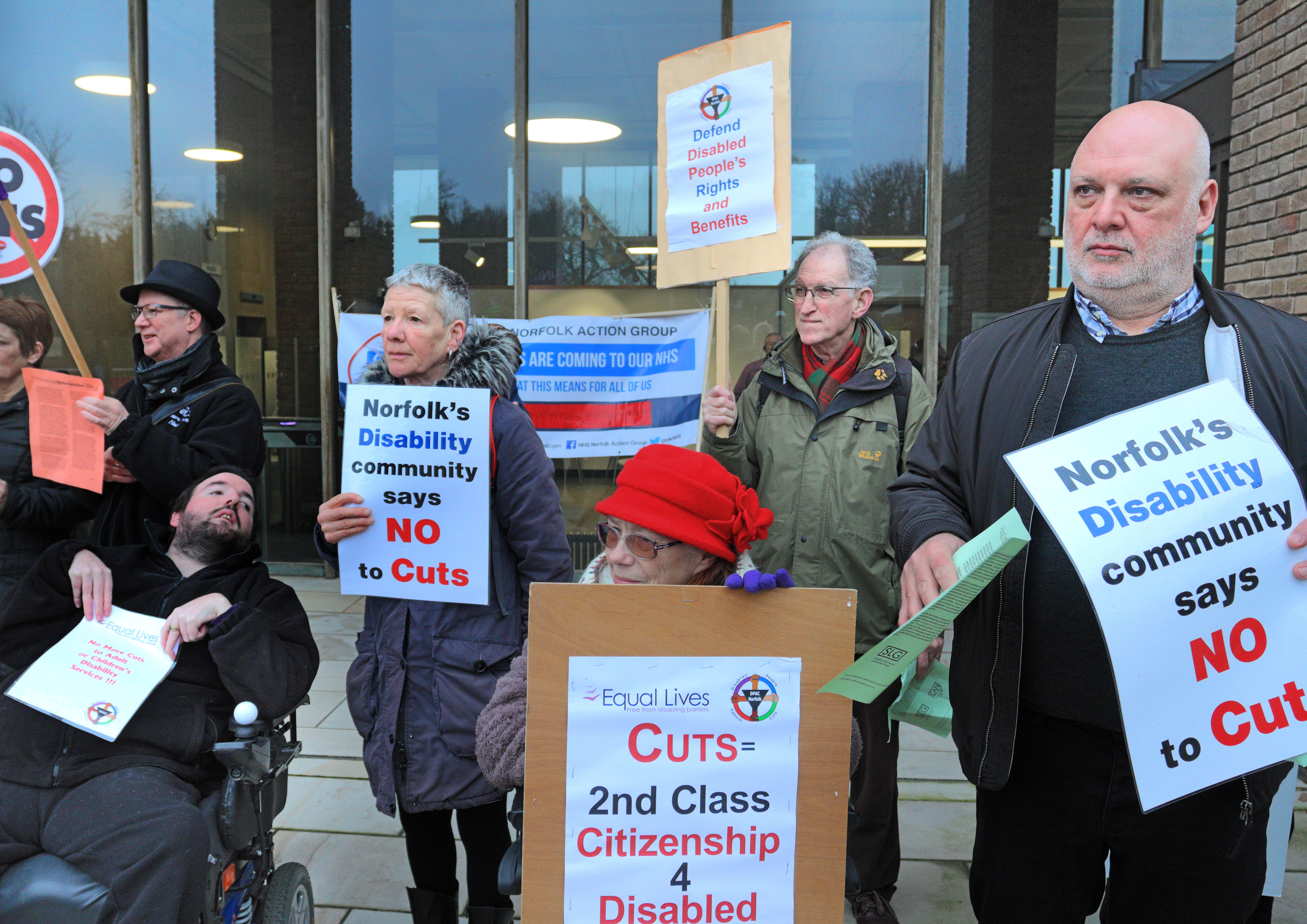
DPAC campaigning against cuts to social care in 2017

In 2012, 2013, 2016, and 2017 DPAC held a 'Week of Action' to highlight the impact of austerity and cuts on disabled peoples' lives. From 27 August 2012, DPAC hosted a week of 'The Atos Games' which focused on highlighting the hypocrisy of the sponsorship of the Paralympic games by Atos – the company which carries out the controversial Work Capability Assessments. Events included a spoof 'paralympic award ceremony', and the delivery of a coffin to Atos offices. On 30 August 2012, campaigners staging a "die in" in Cardiff brought traffic to a standstill. On the closing day of the event, a demonstration outside Atos head offices moved to the offices of the Department for Work and Pensions (DWP) where protestors chained themselves to the main entrance.

Reclaiming our Futures was a week of action held from 29 August to 4 September 2013 to protest against the targeting of disabled people by austerity measures, and to celebrate the value, pride and self-determination of disabled people. The event features an on-line day of action launch, coinciding with the Torch Relay protest organised by Transport for All to highlight lack of accessibility on the new crossrail trainline currently being constructed. 30 August saw local protests across the UK. 'The Social Model in the 21st century' conference saw key note speeches by Debbie Jolly of DPAC, Professor Colin Barnes and Ann Rae of the Union of the Physically Impaired Against Segregation (UPIAS). The week included a direct action outside the BBC to highlight biased representation of disabled people and promotion of 'scrounger rhetoric' and culminated on a march on parliament during which the UK Disabled Peoples Manifesto was launched.

The 2016 Week Of Action was held to coincide with the Paralympic Games in London in September. Events included a pop-up guerilla art installation at Tate Modern and the closing of Westminster Bridge by activists.

The 2017 Week of Action, in August, included support for RMT action to keep guards on trains, a protest outside ATOS HQ, and the blocking of the main entrance to the House of Commons chamber.

=== On the Record ===
In 2019, DPAC activists in Manchester and Sheffield started a campaign to have assessments for Personal Independence Payment (PIP) audio recorded, in response to reports of assessment companies recording inaccurate information during assessments and producing flawed decisions. Because the Department for Work and Pensions only allowed audio recording of assessments via CD and audio cassette, the campaign raised funds to purchase the necessary audio recording equipment so that it could be loaned out for free to people facing PIP assessments. Activists stressed that while the initiative aimed to ensure greater accountability and fairness in the current process, the ultimate aim of the campaign remained to scrap work capability and PIP assessments altogether. The campaign was supported by Labour Party MPs including Dan Carden and Emma Hardy.

In 2020, the DWP committed to a new approach to "provide consistency for claimants across audio recording of work capability assessments and personal independence payment assessments". On 30 September 2020, the secretary of state for work and pensions Therese Coffey told the Work and Pensions Select Committee that assessors had begun audio recording assessments.

=== Day of Action ===
On 26 March 2025, DPAC held a peaceful protest across the UK, with a team in London meeting at Downing Street, to showcase mass disapproval against the upcoming changes to disability benefits proposed by Liz Kendall, including tightening of PIP eligibility, in order for the government to save an estimate of £5 billion over the next decade. These changes will come into effect in November 2026, though have been meet with universal backlash by disabled individuals, who consider it unfair and a violation of their rights. Some disabled charities have listed these actions as "immoral and devastating". The social media hashtag for this protest is #WellfareNotWarfare.

== Notable members ==
- Naomi Westerman
- Merry Cross

== See also ==
- Anti-austerity movement in the United Kingdom
- Disablement Income Group
- Disability rights movement
- National Campaign Against Fees and Cuts
- The Disability Foundation
- UK Uncut
