= Rough Sleepers Initiative =

The Rough Sleepers Initiative was an initiative by the Government of the United Kingdom's Rough Sleepers Unit (RSU), which resulted from a campaign by St Mungo's, a London homelessness charity, called National Sleep Out Week. It was designed to accommodate homeless people with emergency hostels.

== Rough sleepers—initiatives to reduce the numbers of rough sleepers ==
=== Background ===
London, as the UK's capital city, has always attracted large numbers of migrants unable to find affordable housing. Other large towns and cities had similar populations of homeless people and some sleeping rough but on a much smaller scale.

Many had severe and enduring mental health problems like schizophrenia, which made them 'homeless and rootless' or meant they had no settled way of life. Others had impoverished or no social support from family or friends. Some had left institutions like the army, prison, care homes or psychiatric hospitals.

These migrants slept in places that were mainly hidden from public view. Lincoln's Inn Fields was one site, the arches under Waterloo Bridge and the area behind the Royal Festival Hall were others. The most famous was the area covered by Hungerford Bridge by Embankment Station, where charity 'soup runs' handed out food and blankets, medical assistance and other forms of social support including offers of a bed for the night - a 'kip'.

During the 1980s, a number of factors combined to turn gradually what had been a background issue into a social and political crisis.

Rising property values turned run-down Victorian terraced family housing, whose owners had been making ends meet by renting rooms to low-skilled migrant laborers, into marketable assets. These lodgings or 'digs' were often run by women 'landladies', who provided some social support as well as basic lodgings and meals for an affordable rent. These were sold off through this period leaving their one-time residents homeless.

A slowdown in the merchant shipping and docks in the Port of London led to a layoff of men who were mobile and had been well paid but in idleness had nowhere to go and found work hard to come by

Changes in government policy designed to improve the accommodation standards for hostel dwellers closed an estimated 5,000 places in London hostels. This loss of basic shelter put the numbers of people sleeping rough into the thousands on the streets of the UK capital.

There was a view that 'Care in the Community' had led to psychiatric hospital patients being turned out into the streets. Though this was never substantiated, many ex-patients did suffer neglect and abuse once released.

News coverage of the rising street population became a part of the mood music to the Tory government's unravelling social and economic policy agenda.

=== St Mungo's and National Sleep Out Week ===
In 1989 St Mungo's, a homelessness charity, organised National Sleep Out Week to highlight the problem and give a focus to the mood of concern. The second such event in 1990 was discussed in Parliament and recorded in Hansard (view here). Coverage was repeated in 1991 and the diminishing popularity of Mrs Thatcher's premiership was highlighted by the 30,000 people said to have slept out to raise awareness and funds to help homeless people.

Mrs Thatcher's fall from grace with her parliamentary party is dated to a speech by her Deputy Prime Minister Geoffrey Howe, whose wife Elspeth took a leading role in publicising the homelessness campaign and is widely credited with writing the speech that her husband delivered in Parliament, leading to his boss's political demise.

In 1993, Michael Leapman wrote in The Independent,

"[Elspeth Howe] has also been an active campaigner against homelessness. In June 1990 she was one of several prominent people who spent the night in a cardboard box to highlight the problem. Sir Geoffrey was then still a member of the Cabinet and Margaret Thatcher, the prime minister, was furious at Lady Howe's gesture. It helped to widen the rift that led first to Sir Geoffrey's resignation (it was said that Lady Howe wrote his speech) and thence to Mrs Thatcher's removal from office."

Once Mrs Thatcher had gone, Sir George Young bt, a Tory 'wet' with a long-standing interest in homelessness and a solid reputation amongst campaigners, was appointed housing minister with 200 million GBP to spend on getting people off the streets.

The level of street homelessness (rough sleeping) has declined steadily in England since the late 1980s following a number of successful government-funded programmes introduced from 1990 onwards by both Conservative and Labour governments.

These initiatives are often referred to as the Rough Sleepers Initiative (RSI). In fact, the three phases of the RSI lasted from 1990 until 1999. Until 1997 the RSI was concentrated on London where the number of rough sleepers was far higher than in any other part of the country. In 1997 the RSI was extended to 36 other areas of England. In 1999, following the publication of a government report ‘Coming in from the Cold’, the RSI was replaced by a new programme, overseen by the RSU, which had been created in the previous year following the election of a Labour government.

The RSI commenced in 1990 as a result of a continuous rise in rough sleeping during much of the 1980s, notably in central London where the number of rough sleepers was particularly high and visible, and therefore political sensitivity around the numbers, especially pronounced.

During the 1980s a number of large encampments of rough sleepers grew up in various places, usually referred to by the media as 'Cardboard City'. In fact Cardboard City was in a sense a mobile city. In the early 1980s it existed close to the River Thames at the London Embankment tube station and was closed as a rough sleepers site by Westminster City Council working with the voluntary sector so that the space used by rough sleepers could be upgraded into a retail shopping area. Many rough sleepers were assisted to find permanent accommodation (self-contained council and housing association flats) through the resettlement work that was undertaken prior to the site being closed.

Cardboard City then relocated to Lincoln's Inn Fields, a central London park, where a similar closure operation took place in the late 1980s, and then onto a site in South London, ‘the Bullring’, where a third closure operation took place in the early 1990s. On each occasion some parts of the voluntary sector engaged with the relevant local authority to support the clearance of rough sleepers from the area. The justification for doing this was not only the inevitability of the closure but also the offer of additional help for the rough sleepers affected, including access to permanent accommodation and extra help to address other support needs associated with poor mental and physical health and substance misuse.

Some organisations opted to not be part of this partnership on the grounds that for rough sleepers it was an infringement of their liberty and would lead to rough sleepers being displaced elsewhere. Indeed, the evidence showed that some people did not take up the offer of help and moved to sleep at a different site. However, others were successfully housed and were able to maintain their accommodation, with support.

By the late 1980s in London approximately 1,000 men and women could be found sleeping on the streets of central London on any one night, mostly in the central London boroughs of Westminster, Camden and Lambeth. The increase in rough sleeping arose for a variety of reasons including:

- A reduction in the number of hostel (shelter) bed-spaces in London as a result of hostels being upgraded from dormitory accommodation into single room accommodation, leading to higher quality hostels but with fewer bed-spaces.
- Reductions in benefit levels and related restrictions affecting people under 25, leading to an increase in rough sleeping among this age group.
- An increase in levels of unemployment in the UK, inevitably decreasing the ability of people on low incomes to maintain accommodation.
- A reduction in the number of social housing units being built and a loss of social housing units as people took up the ‘right to buy’ their local authority council accommodation through an initiative introduced by the Conservative government.

The three phases of the RSI ran from 1990 until 1999 costing the government in total over £200 million. Running concurrently in the early phase was a connected initiative called the Homeless Mentally Ill Initiative (HMII) which arose from public concern about the danger posed by rough sleepers with mental health problems both to the public and to themselves. The HMII was modest in size compared to the RSI but led to the creation of a range of high quality temporary and permanent self-contained accommodation for rough sleepers with mental health problems and included the funding of linked mental health teams to support and complement the work of the generic housing teams providing residential support.

The RSI concentrated on funding:

- The building of almost 4,000 units of accommodation (mostly self-contained, some shared) for rough sleepers across London with the majority of units constructed in south London where land is cheaper.
- Resettlement teams tasked with referring appropriate rough sleepers into the RSI accommodation and supporting them so that they could maintain the accommodation.
- Street outreach teams such as those run by Thames Reach St Mungo's and Broadway making the initial contact with rough sleepers.
- Basic emergency winter shelters in temporary buildings.
- Spaces for rough sleepers in hostels.

The initiative was essentially a partnership between central and local government and the voluntary sector. Additionally, housing associations, health care providers, the police and local businesses were also engaged within what became labelled a multi-agency approach. This was reflected at government level in the creation of an inter-departmental ministerial group to draw together different government departments with responsibilities for people sleeping rough.

The voluntary sector organisations were funded directly by government to provide services. Central government took the unusual step of funding directly as it had little confidence in local authorities to address the problem of rough sleeping. Furthermore, in London the Margaret Thatcher administration of the 1980s had dissolved the Greater London Council and there was therefore no regional body in the capital in a position to take on funding responsibility.

The delivery structure model was based around a number of local consortia that did not take account of local authority boundaries but were instead constructed around the main rough sleeping areas in central London. The consortia were extremely inclusive and as such, often unwieldy due to the size of the membership, which included representatives from the voluntary, local government, central government and business sectors.

The RSI, through its various phases succeeded in the following areas:

- It successfully brought together key players around a focused task of reducing rough sleeping.
- Although there were delays in the building of new accommodation for rough sleepers, eventually almost 4,000 units of mostly self-contained accommodation was built with the intention of being for rough sleepers ‘in perpetuity’.
- Resettlement teams ensured that rough sleepers were not only found accommodation, but helped to maintain their tenancy, with some success.
- Outreach teams working in central London provided a greater presence than ever before and developed a process for ‘gate-keeping’ access to the rough sleepers units to avoid them being filled by people who had not slept rough who invariably have lower needs.
- Most importantly, the number of rough sleepers to be found on London's streets on any one night fell from around 1,000 to 270 by 1995.

The limitations of the RSI were that:

- Although numbers fell, by the mid-1990s a plateau seemed to have been reached and although rough sleepers continued to be helped off the street, new rough sleepers took their place.
- Resettlement support offered from the teams was short-term, often for only six months, and as a result statistics showed that almost 20% of people helped into self-contained accommodation left within one year, often to returning to the street.
- The ‘gate-keeping’ of accommodation by the voluntary sector organisations was very mixed with some agencies undertaking it with greater diligence than others. Spot checks on the self-contained accommodation meant exclusively for rough sleepers exposed that a significant minority of people referred to rough sleeper accommodation had, in fact, never slept rough.

== Rough Sleepers Unit (RSU) ==
By 1997 the incoming Labour government wanted a different and more effective approach to dealing with rough sleeping. It created the Social Exclusion Unit (SEU), situated within the Prime Minister's Cabinet Office, to prioritise the key social issues to be tackled by the new administration. Rough sleeping was selected as a high priority and the RSU was created, headed up by a high profile and plain-speaking ‘homelessness tsar’ called Louise Casey.

The RSU was tasked with reducing rough sleeping across England by two-thirds within a three-year time frame. As the programme was late to start, this was in the end compressed into a period of slightly over two years. The practical and ideological approach of the RSU differed markedly from the RSI. Notably:

- The head of the RSU, Louise Casey led the programme on a very ‘hands on’ basis, routinely going onto the street herself with her team, directly making referrals into hostels and tracking rough sleepers with the explicit objective of ‘shaking up’ the system where she perceived it to be failing. Her team comprised career civil servants and also an array of individuals hand-picked from the voluntary sector to work with her.
- The approach required from outreach teams was different, with teams expected to be more assertive in their approach to rough sleepers. The approach from staff to rough sleepers changed from one characterised by ‘working with you at your own pace’ to the more direct ‘why are you here and what do you need to help you get off the street?’

The RSU funding approach was also different in the following ways:

- Outreach teams continued to be funded, now known as Contact and Assessment Teams (CATS), as an important element of the programme but the number of teams was reduced to avoid duplication and to give greater ownership of geographical areas in central London.
- Resettlement teams were reshaped into six Tenancy Sustainment Teams (TSTs) operating on a geographical basis, with the task of sustaining former rough sleepers in self-contained accommodation and with no time limit imposed concerning the length of time over which support could be offered.
- The RSU concentrated on providing additional resources to frontline hostels, rather than on funding a large flat-building programme. Through its financial investment in hostels the RSU was able to ring-fence bed-spaces in the hostels for rough sleepers, so increasing the throughput of people coming in off the streets. It also funded specialist bed-spaces for people with drug and alcohol problems.
- Night centres were funded in London, Bristol and Manchester to provide easy access off the streets and an inviting environment for rough sleepers who were unwilling to take up a hostel bed or were banned from hostels.
- A series of temporary (‘rolling’) shelters were funded to provide basic emergency, short-stay accommodation for rough sleepers as a replacement for the seasonal winter shelter programme.
- The consortium model was re-shaped to be more streamlined and focused with fewer partners, less bureaucracy and stronger leadership required from local authorities.
- More attention was given to tracking rough sleepers through the hostel system and to sharing information between partner organisations via a central database called ‘Chain’.
- A stronger role was given to the police with additional funding coming from central government to fund the Safer Streets Police Team to work with street users (not just entrenched rough sleepers but street drinkers, people begging on the street, new arrivals to the street etc.).
- Attention was given to tackling what were seen as the magnets drawing people back into street homelessness, including street begging and soup runs provided by faith groups. For example, the RSU ran a high-profile campaign aimed at discouraging the public from giving money to people begging on the street.

The RSU phase came to an end in 2002 following the successful reduction by 70% of rough sleeping across England, so achieving the Prime Minister's target of a two-thirds reduction. In London the reduction was more modest and the two-thirds reduction target was not met.

The following factors led to the RSU being successful:

- The high–profile leadership given by the Head of the RSU linked with the importance given to the reduction in rough sleeping by the Prime Minister Tony Blair had a galvanising effect and created considerable momentum.
- The direct approach taken by the RSU coupled with a more assertive outreach approach successfully reduced the numbers of rough sleepers at key central London ‘hotspots’. Where before rough sleepers congregated in groups of up to 100, by 2001 it was rare to see a hotspot containing more than a dozen rough sleepers.
- The exclusive allocation of bed-spaces to rough sleepers in key frontline hostels created the ‘flow-through’ from the streets required to achieve the target.
- Investment in outreach teams and hostels in cities outside London such as Birmingham and York where there had been little investment previously led to a dramatic drop in numbers sleeping rough.
- The TSTs proved more successful than their predecessors in sustaining former rough sleepers in tenancies with the eviction and abandonment rates plummeting from almost 20% of tenants leaving accommodation within one year of a tenancy starting to under 5%.
- The relationships between the voluntary sector organisations and the police became formalised and more effective and were characterised by a more integrated approach, rather than the different bodies working in parallel. This was illustrated in practical terms through the creation of a regular meeting involving police, local authority representatives and voluntary sector agencies at which information on rough sleepers was shared. Where appropriate and beneficial, joint street-work was undertaken.

There were criticisms of the RSU's approach from a number of quarters and its successes were not unqualified. In particular:

- Some charities expressed severe misgivings at the assertive approach encouraged by the RSU and believed it to be too aggressive, disrespectful to rough sleepers and counter-productive. They also challenged the veracity of street counts which were increasingly perceived as intended to produce a low figure on an allotted night, rather than being a genuine reflection of the number of rough sleepers.
- The RSU concentrated on making the street count figure the headline outcome figure, giving less prominence to the fact that the numbers of rough sleepers sleeping out over a year in central London was approximately ten times the number of people sleeping rough on any single night.
- Although numbers on the streets went down, central London hostels were soon full to over-flowing with rough sleepers, many of whom had multiple needs. Critics claimed that people were being ‘warehoused’ in hostels rather than being helped to find long-term, settled accommodation.
- In London the reduction in rough sleeping was less than elsewhere in the country and in the central London borough of Westminster where over 100 people continued to sleep rough on any one night, the problem appeared particularly intractable.

The UK Social Exclusion Unit and the Rough Sleeping Unit inspired a similar initiative in Australia following meetings with Tony Blair and Louise Casey. In South Australia, the State Government of Premier Mike Rann (2002 to 2011) committed substantial funding to a series of initiatives designed to combat homelessness. Advised by Social Inclusion Commissioner David Cappo and the founder of New York's Common Ground program, Rosanne Haggerty, the Rann Government established Common Ground Adelaide building high quality inner city apartments (combined with intensive support) for "rough sleeping" homeless people. The government also funded the Street to Home program and a hospital liaison service designed to assist homeless people who are admitted to the Emergency Departments of Adelaide's major public hospitals. Rather than being released back into homelessness, patients identified as rough sleepers are found accommodation backed by professional support. Common Ground and Street to Home now operate across Australia in other States.

== Post RSU—The Homelessness Directorate ==
The RSU was reshaped in 2002 to become the Homelessness Directorate which, in turn, was later subsumed within the Department for Communities and Local Government. The new direction from 2002 on centred on the following priorities:

- Continuing to work towards a reduction in rough sleeping but to give the lead role in achieving this to local authorities across the country, including devolving to them the funding of rough sleepers’ services.
- Each local authority was expected to develop a Homelessness Strategy, including plans for the further reduction in rough sleeping and areas with high numbers of rough sleepers were required to undertake, and report on, annual street counts.
- Central government gave greater priority and resources to reducing anti-social behaviour and the former homelessness tsar, Louise Casey was given a new role in this area as head of the Government's Respect Task Force.
- Emphasis was placed on preventative services, particularly with the development of a new housing-related funding stream called ‘Supporting People’ which offered more opportunities to support vulnerable people in their flats in the community and so prevent the loss of accommodation and homelessness.
- Street outreach teams working with rough sleepers were also urged to prioritise preventative approaches and to consider a range of possibilities, including helping people return home, rather than referring to a hostel bed as a first option.

== Conclusion ==
Considerable progress has been made in reducing rough sleeping in England with the voluntary sector playing a lead role. Some parts of the voluntary sector have chosen to remain outside the collaborative framework that has been created to achieve the reduction. London continues to have the biggest rough sleeping problem with between 250 and 300 individuals sleeping out on any night and almost 3,000 over a year. Nonetheless, this figure compares favourably with rough sleeping figures for other European capitals and is considerably lower than, for example, New York which has a comparable population to London.

In the last year England has experienced a 9% rise in rough sleeping and there is renewed interest in reducing numbers of rough sleepers on the streets of London following the selection of London as host city for the 2012 Olympics.

Data published by London's Poverty Profile – a joint project of New Policy Institute and Trust for London – shows the number of rough sleepers found by outreach teams has more than doubled between 2007 and 2012/13 to around 6,400.
