= US Uncut =

American tax avoidance protest group

- Formation: February 2011; 15 years ago
- Founder: Ryan Clayton, Joanne Gifford, Carl Gibson
- Founded at: USA
- Purpose: political activism
- Website: www.usuncut.org

US Uncut was a decentralized direct action group in the United States established in February 2011 to draw attention to corporate tax avoidance, cuts to social spending, and public sector jobs.

== History ==
US Uncut was co-founded in 2011 by Ryan Clayton, Joanne Gifford, and Carl Gibson. The US-based organization draws its name, organizing structure, and tactics from UK Uncut, a movement that had begun only four months earlier in London, England.

The organization's activities were the subject of a Sundance Film Festival documentary, We're Not Broke, which follows the group's co-founders nonviolent direct actions at corporate storefronts across the country. According to the film's website, "We're Not Broke is the story of how U.S. corporations have been able to hide over a trillion dollars from Uncle Sam, and how seven fed-up Americans from across the country, take their frustration to the streets . . . and vow to make the corporations pay their fair share." The film is available to watch for free on Netflix (U.S.) and Vimeo (International).

The group's first action occurred simultaneously in 50 cities across the United States, mostly at Bank of America branches. Bank of America was chosen for its role in the 2008 financial crisis and the fact that it paid no income taxes in 2009 or 2010. By May 2011, over 100 cities had had Uncut sponsored actions.

In April 2011, in political action to highlight corporate tax avoidance, US Uncut published a news story based on a fake press release that said General Electric was returning its 3.2 billion dollar tax refund to the U.S. Treasury. The hoax was done in collaboration with The Yes Men. The Associated Press distributed the story through its web site, before taking it down 35 minutes after publishing it.

In addition to its protests directed towards Bank of America, US Uncut has organized protests at Verizon stores, BP stations, FedEx stores, Target stores and British Petroleum.

== Criticisms ==
In August 2016, US Uncut's Facebook page, with 1.5 million followers, was hijacked and began posting articles from an impostor site mockingly named US Uncut. On March 2 or 3, 2017, their site was shut down with the message "Sorry, we had to shut down the site.Thank you for reading our articles all these years." This was a result of a legal settlement between Carl Gibson, Mark Provost and co-founder Ryan Clayton.

US Uncut's web site has been criticized as being a partisan liberal site. The organization's website has been accused of deceiving readers and of publishing inaccurate news stories.

== See also ==
- Corporate welfare
- Corruption
- Crony capitalism
- Offshore bank
- Offshore financial centre
- Tax haven
