= UK Uncut =

Early-2010s UK-based tax avoidance protest groups

- Founded: October 2010
- Type: Advocacy group
- Purpose: Anti-austerity, Tax avoidance
- Location: United Kingdom
- Region served: United Kingdom
- Method: Demonstration
- Website: uk-uncut.com

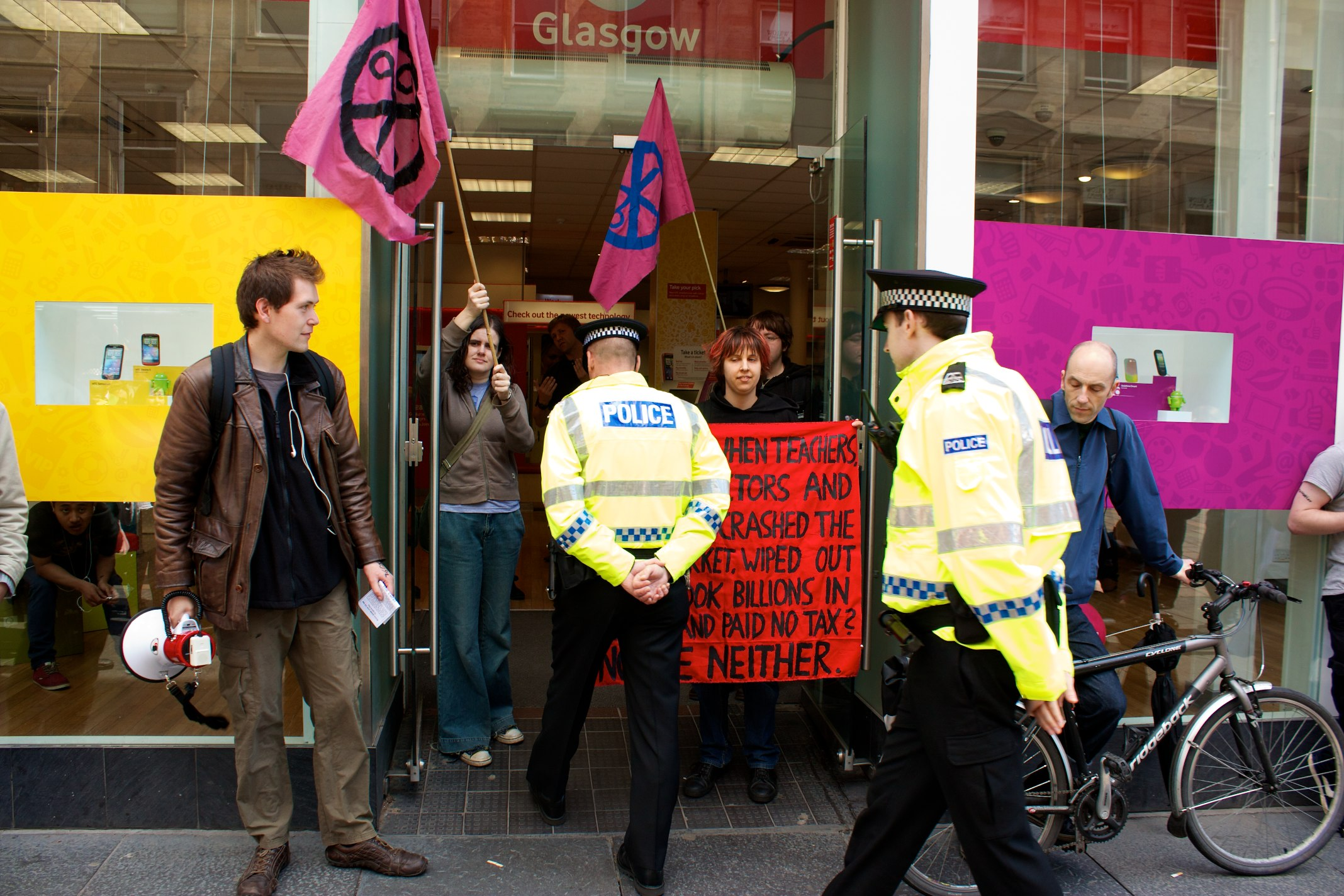
UK Uncut protest at a Vodafone shop in Glasgow on 30 June 2011

UK Uncut was a network of United Kingdom-based protest groups established in October 2010 to protest against cuts to public services and tax avoidance in the UK. Various sources have described the group as left-wing in its political orientation.

== History ==
The idea of UK Uncut originated in October 2010 with a group of ten activists in a north London pub who claimed that clamping down on tax avoidance would be a credible alternative to public sector spending cuts. Private Eye had recently published an article alleging that Vodafone had reached a highly favourable settlement of a long-standing tax dispute with HM Revenue and Customs so they organised a protest against a store on Oxford Street. Protesters met at Piccadilly and successfully closed the store.

== Tactics and targets ==
The group uses direct action to disrupt the business of high street stores and banks that they believe have a connection with tax avoidance. Actions are organised independently by local UK Uncut groups and promoted through the UK Uncut website.

Vodafone was targeted after Private Eye alleged that a deal they made with HM Revenue and Customs substantially reduced the amount of back taxes that they had to pay. Private Eye alleged that Vodafone were originally found liable for £6 billion, but negotiated the amount to be paid down to under £2 billion. However, the National Audit Office said that the settlement represented reasonable value for the British taxpayer.

The Arcadia Group's shops including Topshop, BHS, and Burton have been targeted as the group is owned by Tina Green, the wife of Sir Phillip Green. Tina Green is a resident of Monaco and was able to receive a dividend of £1.2bn from the group free of UK income tax in 2005.

Boots was targeted on 30 January 2011 as the protesters claimed it avoided UK tax by being registered in Switzerland. Three people needed hospital treatment after police used CS spray when attempting to arrest a protester.

Fortnum & Mason was targeted during 26 March 2011 anti-cuts protests. UK Uncut claimed that the parent company, Wittington Investments was "guilty of tax avoidance". This took the form of a mass sit-in. The police arrested and charged 138 protesters with aggravated trespass. Of these, ten were convicted and were given a conditional discharge and fined £1,000. Their convictions were upheld at the Court of Appeal.

In November 2011, the legal arm of UK Uncut took HM Revenue & Customs to court. HMRC had been accused of failing to provide substantial reasons for not collecting billions of pounds in tax revenue.

HMRC are unable to comment on specific taxpayers' tax affairs. Instead, the National Audit Office (NAO) were asked to review the settlements in question, one being Vodafone, as mentioned above. The NAO found that "the settlements reached by HMRC in these five cases were all reasonable".

=== Banks ===
Through meetings on Twitter at the end of January 2011 it was decided that the next UK Uncut targets would be banks that were alleged to have caused the financial crisis and had been bailed out by the government with billions of pounds. UK Uncut called for people to stage "bail-ins" to turn banks into things that UK Uncut perceived as being threatened by the cuts.

HSBC have also been accused of avoiding £2 billion worth of tax by Private Eye magazine by using a complicated system of channeling profits through the Netherlands.

On 19 February 2011, Barclays was targeted. The date was arranged to coincide with their bonus announcements. It was also alleged that Barclays was only paying 1% corporation tax in the UK.

On 26 February, a day of action was called against the Royal Bank of Scotland and their subsidiary NatWest. The protest was arranged to coincide with the banks' bonus announcements. Once again protestors turned bank branches into services that they considered were threatened by the cuts.

=== Healthcare ===
On 9 October 2011, 2,000 health workers and activists took part in a sit-down protest on Westminster Bridge organised by UK Uncut in opposition to the proposed Health and Social Care Bill.

The group has also targeted Atos, an IT company whose healthcare division operates a program for the Department for Work and Pensions to assess workers claiming disability benefits to see if they are "incapable" of work. Critics have felt that its program has lacked integrity and that its real goal is to divert funding from disabled people due to a lowered budget. The group also felt that it was inappropriate for Atos to sponsor the 2012 Summer Paralympics in London, a high profile global event for disabled people, given how its operation of the program has impacted the lives of many disabled workers through the denial of benefits. UK Uncut held a week of protests dubbed "The Atos Games" during the last week of August, to coincide with the start of the Paralympics and ending with a joint demonstration with Disabled People Against Cuts on 31 August, outside the London headquarters of Atos and the Department for Work and Pensions.

UK Uncut protesters, who were unimpressed by Starbucks' offer to pay £20 million corporation tax in the next two years, took part in protests in December 2012.

== Spin-offs ==
A similar protest group inspired by UK Uncut has formed in the US under the name US Uncut. The protest also spread to other European countries, creating decentralized protest groups like Portugal Uncut. A group called Take VAT targeted several companies avoiding VAT by selling goods to the UK through the Channel Islands.

== See also ==
- Anti-austerity protests
- Offshore account
- People's Assembly Against Austerity
- Tax haven
- Sisters Uncut
