= Grooming gangs scandal =

Sexual abuse scandal in the United Kingdom

Several government reviews have reported failures by British institutions in preventing, identifying and prosecuting the widespread cases of group-based child sexual abuse and exploitation that mostly occurred between the 1990s and 2010s. Allegations of governmental and institutional failures to respond to the problem or to downplay or cover up the issue have been described as a grooming gangs scandal.

Media coverage and political discourse around these crimes has especially focused on the ethnic and religious background of perpetrators in high-profile cases, most of whom were Muslim men of Pakistani descent, and whether this prevented proper investigation. Data in Greater Manchester, South Yorkshire and West Yorkshire shows that, in the 2020s, men of an Asian ethnic background are disproportionately represented among perpetrators in those areas, but there is insufficient data to draw conclusions about ethnicity of perpetrators across the UK.

The National Audit on Group-based Child Sexual Exploitation and Abuse ("Casey audit") called for better recording of ethnicity by police forces to prevent misinformation, aid examination of the underlying issues, and restore public trust. In 2025, following the Casey audit's recommendations, the British Government indicated it would fund a national inquiry into the issue of group-based child sexual exploitation, including the role played by the ethnic background of offenders and to what extent there were failings by local authorities in the prevention and policing of such abuse.

The crimes resulted in increased racial and religious tensions in the United Kingdom and the issue has become politicised.

== Terminology ==
Group-based child sexual exploitation and localised grooming are terms used to describe the sexual exploitation or grooming of children and adolescents by groups. Group-based child sexual exploitation was first defined in UK law in the Department for Children, Schools and Families' statutory guidance, Safeguarding Children & Young People from Sexual Exploitation. Supplementary guidance to Working Together to Safeguard Children in 2009.

A 2013 report by the House of Commons Home Affairs Select Committee describes a group first making contact with the child in a public place. After the group's initial contact with the child, offers of treats (takeaway food, cigarettes, drugs) persuade the child to maintain the relationship. Sometimes a boy similar in age presents himself as a "boyfriend"; this person arranges for the child to be raped by other members of the group. Children may end up being raped by dozens of these group members, and may be trafficked to connected groups in other towns.

== Background ==
In August 2003, a television documentary reported details of an 18-month police and social services investigation into allegations that young British Asian men were targeting under-age girls for sex, drugs and prostitution in the West Yorkshire town of Keighley. The Leeds-based Coalition for the Removal of Pimping (Crop) sought to bring this behaviour to national attention from at least 2010. In November 2010, the Rotherham child sexual exploitation scandal saw several convictions of child sexual abusers. In 2012, members of the Rochdale child sex abuse ring were convicted on various counts, and in 2016, following the largest child sexual exploitation investigation in the UK, 18 men in the Halifax child sex abuse ring case were sentenced to a combined total of over 175 years in prison.

Following further child sex abuse rings in Aylesbury, Banbury, Bristol, Derby, Huddersfield, Manchester, Newcastle, Oxford, Peterborough, Rochdale, Rhyl, Telford, and others, several investigations considered how prevalent British Asian backgrounds were in localised grooming. In 2011 and 2013, the National Crime Agency's Child Exploitation and Online Protection (CEOP) branch collected the available data on group-based child sexual abuse from police forces in England and Wales. It reported that, where ethnicity information was available, 28% (2011) and 75% (2013) of offenders had been recorded as "Asian" by the police. The Home Office said the figures should be treated with caution as the data was incomplete and was at particular risk of bias, and recorded ethnicity was based on police assigning offenders to broad categories, rather than on offenders' own self-report. In December 2017, the think tank Quilliam released a report that said 84% of offenders were of South Asian heritage. This report was criticised by child sexual exploitation experts Ella Cockbain and Waqas Tufail, who said it was unscientific and had poor methodology.

A further investigation was carried out by the Conservative government in December 2020, which concluded that most offenders were probably white, as with most child sexual abuse cases generally, and that there was insufficient data in this area to suggest South Asians, or any other ethnic group, were disproportionately represented among perpetrators. The government originally refused to release the report but eventually did so after public pressure. In response to the report, then Home Secretary Priti Patel said: "This paper demonstrates how difficult it has been to draw conclusions about the characteristics of offenders." Reviews of the Rotherham, Rochdale, and Telford cases identified several common factors, with offenders often working in night-time industries like takeaways and taxis, providing access to vulnerable children.

In 2023, then Prime Minister Rishi Sunak stated that victims had been failed due to political correctness, and established a taskforce to target this specific issue. In 2025, the Labour government commissioned Baroness Casey to make a detailed audit of these cases, published as the National Audit on Group-based Child Sexual Exploitation and Abuse. In her audit, Baroness Casey wrote: "Assertions that the majority of child sexual abuse offenders are White, even if true, are at best misleading. In a population with over of 80% of people of White ethnicity, it should always be a significant issue when people from a White background are not in the majority of victims or perpetrators of crime" The review found that there were serious shortcomings in the recording of ethnicity data about perpetrators of group-based sexual abuse. In one instance, Casey stated finding a case file where the word "Pakistani" had been tippexed out. On 14 June 2025, having previously resisted launching an investigation, Prime Minister Keir Starmer announced that the British government would launch a full national statutory inquiry into grooming gangs.

== Statistics ==
According to the National Audit on Group-based Child Sexual Exploitation and Abuse (2025), 28.5% of cases of contact sexual abuse can be described as sexual exploitation (17,000 of 60,000 contact offences in 2024), whether by individuals or groups. The National Audit on Group-based Child Sexual Exploitation and Abuse noted that there is a lack of data on group-based offences, with the Complex and Organised Child Abuse Dataset (COCAD) recording around 700 in 2023 (i.e., 4% of exploitation offences).

This type of abuse tends to target girls who are particularly vulnerable, such as those who are in local authority care. The youngest recorded victim was 12 and the oldest was 18.

The Jay Report suggested that the number of Asian victims may be underrepresented. According to the Muslim Women's Network UK, Asian victims may be particularly vulnerable to threats of bringing shame and dishonour to their families, and may have believed that reporting the abuse would be an admission they had violated their cultural beliefs. One of the local Pakistani women's groups had described Pakistani girls being targeted by Pakistani taxi drivers and landlords, but they feared reporting to the police out of concerns for their marriage prospects. The report suggested "the under-reporting of exploitation and abuse in minority ethnic communities" should be addressed.

=== Offenders ===
In spite of high-profile cases being tied by media and public perception to the British Pakistani community, there is poor data regarding the background of grooming gang members on a national scale.

In December 2017, Quilliam, a think tank associated with anti-Islamist statements, released a report that said 84% of offenders involved in grooming gangs were of South Asian heritage. Researchers Ella Cockbain and Waqas Tufail criticised the Quilliam report's conclusions, suggesting it had methodological and scientific flaws.

In December 2020, a report by the Home Office found limited evidence to draw conclusions about the ethnicity of offenders, citing poor quality and incomplete data. It concluded that the ethnicity of perpetrators likely reflected national demographics for child sexual abuse in general, meaning most perpetrators were likely white, and that there was insufficient evidence to indicate whether there was an overrepresentation of Asian and black offenders. It said that it was unlikely any one community or culture was uniquely predisposed to offending. In 2021, an investigation by the Times suggested South Yorkshire Police was not routinely recording the ethnicity of child sexual abuse suspects. In Rotherham, police omitted suspect ethnicity in 67% of cases. The force said it had increased reporting of ethnicity since 2019.

The 2025 Casey audit stated that ethnicity data collected for victims and perpetrators of group-based child sexual exploitation was "not sufficient to allow any conclusions to be drawn at the national level", but that "there have been enough convictions across the country of groups of men from Asian ethnic backgrounds to have warranted closer examination". The audit found that, over a three-year span in "multi-victim/multi-offender cases" in the Greater Manchester area, 52% of offenders were recorded as being of "Asian" ethnicity, with the largest subgroup of those being Pakistani, while 38% were recorded as "White". The report cites the local population as being 21% Asian descent.

Responding to the reaction to her audit, Casey said the public should "keep calm" over the ethnicity data, confirming that while there was a disproportionate number of Asian offenders for sexual exploitation offences in the Greater Manchester region, child abuse offences overall did not show the same disproportionality.

== Investigations and inquiries ==
=== Rotherham grooming gang scandal ===
In 2013, Rotherham Council commissioned an independent inquiry led by Professor Alexis Jay, former chief social work adviser to the Scottish Government, into abuse that occurred between the city. In August 2014, the Jay Report published its recommendations and concluded that an estimated 1,400 children had been sexually abused in Rotherham between 1997 and 2013. The perpetrators were predominantly British-Pakistani men. The majority of victims were white British girls, but British Asian girls in Rotherham were also targeted and received less support or public attention. The failure to address the abuse was attributed to a combination of factors, including fear that the perpetrators' ethnicity would trigger allegations of racism; sexist and classist attitudes toward the mostly working-class victims; lack of a child-centred focus; a desire to protect the town's reputation; and lack of training and resources. Several local authority and police staff members resigned after the report was published. The Independent Police Complaints Commission and the National Crime Agency also opened inquiries in response to the report, with the latter expected to last eight years.

In 2014, the government appointed Louise Casey to conduct an inspection of Rotherham Council, published in January 2015. The Casey report concluded that the council was "not fit for purpose" and had a culture of bullying, sexism, covering up information and silencing whistleblowers. In February 2015 the government replaced the council's elected officers with a team of five commissioners. In July 2022, an independent inquiry chaired by Tom Crowther KC found that more than 1,000 children had been sexually exploited in Telford, Shropshire since 1980s. The inquiry concluded that a "nervousness about race" had permeated creating a "reluctance to act" with officers been "frightened to question or challenge" suspects who were mostly of South Asian heritage with fear of being called racists. Operation Chalice, conducted by West Mercia Police saw seven men, mainly of Pakistani heritage be jailed on charge of rape and human trafficking. West Mercia Police and the council both apologised after the Crowlers report's publication.

=== 2013 House of Commons Home Affairs Committee Report ===
In June 2013, after a year-long investigation, the House of Commons Home Affairs Committee published Child sexual exploitation and the response to localised grooming which reviewed evidence from Rochdale, Rotherham, and Oxford. The report concluded that vulnerable children were being left "unprotected by the system", with "an appalling cost" paid by the victims. The report said that failures had occurred across multiple agencies and were still ongoing. It blamed "police, social services and the Crown Prosecution Service", and said local authorities were slow to act due to "a woeful lack of professional curiosity".

=== 2020 Home Office report ===
In December 2020, the Home Office published the report Group-based Child Sexual Exploitation: Characteristics of Offending, co-written by an external-reference group of members of academia, law enforcement, victim advocates and parliament workers. It concluded that most offenders were white, with some studies showing black and Asian offenders proportionally over-represented. It added that a large amount of high-profile cases involved perpetrators of South Asian origin, but that there was a general lack of data to make a definite conclusion for over-representation in all cases of group-based sexual abuse. The report also stated that the external reference group "did not reach consensus around how the evidence should be presented, particularly with regard to cultural and community contexts." The British government released the report, originally due two years earlier, after a petition by The Independent garnering over 130,000 signatures.

=== 2025 Casey audit ===
In 2025, after initially ruling out an investigation, the Labour government commissioned Baroness Casey to make a detailed audit of these cases, published as the National Audit on Group-based Child Sexual Exploitation and Abuse. The audit found serious shortcomings in the recording of ethnicity data about perpetrators of group-based sexual abuse and recommended improved reporting of ethnicity and nationality for all suspects. The review found that improved data collection by police forces in Greater Manchester, West Yorkshire and South Yorkshire indicated Pakistani men were overrepresented among perpetrators in these areas, but that generally the data was "not good enough to support any statements about the ethnicity of group-based child sexual exploitation offenders at the national level." Casey suggested the gaps in ethnicity data had led to competing and sometimes misleading claims, including by the media and academics, that had eroded trust in institutions. She said the 2020 Home Office report's conclusion that perpetrators were "mostly White" had been widely cited but that this "does not seem to be evidenced in research or data". She said the Independent Inquiry into Child Sexual Abuse was the only source to treat the Home Office report with "any balance" when it said "significant limitations" in the data prevented drawing conclusions nationally.

The Casey report also found the role of the night-time economy, particularly out of area taxi licencing, contributed to child sexual exploitation. In the UK taxi licensing is done by local authorities. In areas at risk of child sexual exploitation, such as Rotherham, licensing requirements exceeded national statutory minimums, but this was undermined by drivers acquiring licenses in other areas of the country and then working instead in higher-risk areas.

=== 2026 Independent Inquiry into Grooming Gangs ===
On 14 June 2025, Prime Minister Keir Starmer announced that the government would launch a full national statutory inquiry into grooming gangs, following the recommendations of the Casey audit, which found that the ethnicity of gangs had been "shied away from". Noting that ethnicity data collected for victims and perpetrators of group-based child sexual exploitation was "not sufficient to allow any conclusions to be drawn at the national level", the report said "there have been enough convictions across the country of groups of men from Asian ethnic backgrounds to have warranted closer examination". Casey said there had been institutional "obfuscation" instead of "examination". Under the Inquiries Act 2005, the minister who sets up an inquiry must appoint a chairman and set terms of reference by an instrument in writing.

On 9 December 2025, Home Secretary Shabana Mahmood made a statement to Parliament announcing the Independent Inquiry into Grooming Gangs, its panel with Baroness Anne Longfield as its chair, and terms of reference to be confirmed no later than March 2026. The draft terms were published the same day.

==== 2026 Scotland inquiry ====
A public inquiry into grooming gangs has been scheduled for the week of 9 November 2026 by the Education Secretary of Scotland, Mairi McAllan. Chaired by Alexis Jay, it will assess Scotland's response towards grooming gangs from 1 January 1996 to 11 November 2026.

== Responses ==
=== Political ===
In 2011, Jack Straw, the former Labour Home Secretary told Newsnight that while most sex offenders were white there was a "specific problem" of men of Pakistani origin targeting white girls and urged the Pakistani community to be "more open" about the problem. His comments were criticised by criminologist Helen Brayley who said racial stereotyping could lead to only looking for cases where Asians were responsible, and by the MP Keith Vaz who said he did not think there was evidence of a cultural problem and that it was not possible to stereotype entire communities. Subsequently throughout the 2010s, Conservative and Reform UK politicians, such as Rishi Sunak have reasserted that race was a factor in grooming gangs and that concerns were not dealt with because of political correctness.

In 2013, Professor Alexis Jay, a retired social worker, led the Independent Inquiry into Child Sexual Exploitation in Rotherham (or Jay Report), which said that such cases were not overlooked because of political correctness, and "found no evidence of children's social care staff being influenced by concerns about the ethnic origins of suspected perpetrators when dealing with individual child protection cases, including CSE". In 2015, Jay attributed the authorities' inaction to "their desire to accommodate a community that would be expected to vote Labour, to not rock the boat, to keep a lid on it, to hope it would go away".

After a 2017 case in Newcastle, former Conservative policing and justice minister Mike Penning urged Attorney General Jeremy Wright to consider the offences against "young white girls" as racially motivated. The judge presiding over the case in question later ruled that the girls were not targeted for their race.

In 2017, the Labour Shadow Minister for Women and Equalities and MP for Rotherham Sarah Champion wrote in The Sun that "Britain has a problem with British Pakistani men raping and exploiting white girls". Champion's remarks came after the prosecution and conviction of 17 men from the Newcastle sex abuse ring, who were from Iraqi, Bangladeshi, Pakistani, Indian, Iranian and Turkish communities, for forcing underage girls to have sex. Champion said that a fear of being called racist was hampering police investigations. Following criticism, including from fellow Labour MP Naz Shah, the Muslim Council of Britain, and the Board of Deputies of British Jews, Champion apologised for the article and resigned as Shadow Minister for Women and Equalities. Following her resignation, Champion accused the left of failing to speak out on grooming gangs for fear of being branded racist.

In 2023, then Home Secretary Suella Braverman said in an opinion piece that "grooming gang" members in the United Kingdom were "almost all British-Pakistani" and held "cultural attitudes completely incompatible with British values". In response, the Independent Press Standards Organisation issued a correction stating that Braverman's article was "misleading", since it did not make it explicit that she was talking about the Rotherham, Rochdale and Telford child sexual abuse scandals in particular. Many experts and organisations called on her to withdraw her comments, saying she was amplifying far-right ideologies and making it harder to address the issue. The National Society for the Prevention of Cruelty to Children (NSPCC) said that by focusing primarily on South Asian men, Braverman was fuelling "misinformation, racism and division". The charity said that "a singular focus on groups of male abusers of British-Pakistani origin draws attention away from so many other sources of harm". Sabah Kaiser, ethnic minority ambassador for the Jay Report, said it was "very, very dangerous for the government to turn child sexual abuse into a matter of colour".

In 2024, Jay said she was "frustrated" that the government had still not taken action two years after her report was published.

In 2025, former Home Office minister Robert Jenrick said group-based child sexual exploitation was "perhaps the greatest racially motivated crime in modern Britain", and said the British state had covered it up to protect community relations. Journalist Nick Robinson said on BBC Radio 4 that he had checked Hansard and Jenrick had not raised the issue when he was a Home Office minister. Simon Danczuk MP said a Labour Party chairman had told him not to draw attention to the ethnicity of the gangs in his Rochdale constituency in case it affected the party's electoral chances. Labour MP Nadia Whittome said the Conservatives and Reform were "weaponising the trauma of victims" for their own game. Prime Minister Keir Starmer said the Conservatives were "playing politics with the safety of vulnerable children" by using the issue to fundraise for the party.

In July 2026, British lawmakers including Andy Burnham pressured the Home Office to deport recently released Rochdale grooming gang leader Shabir Ahmed back to Pakistan. Ahmed's victim, who had been threatened at gunpoint by Ahmed in the past for speaking to the police, has been granted police protection after his release. As of 2026, Pakistan currently refuses Ahmed's deportation, who remained a Pakistani national, after losing his British citizenship following his conviction.

=== Media ===
A number of writers and scholars have accused politicians and the media of creating a moral panic over the issue and fostering Islamophobia.

British media outlets such as The Times and the right-wing GB News, MailOnline, and The Daily Telegraph have especially focussed on the ethnicity of the perpetrators in their reporting of such cases. This has led to increased public awareness and politicisation of the issue. Rochdale police chief Ian Hopkins stated that The Times' sensationalist news reporting around the Rochdale child sex abuse ring scandal had increased communal tensions. Rebecca Riggs, the lead on child protection and abuse investigations at the National Police Chiefs Council (NPCC), said the media focus on Pakistani men could leave other victims "feeling that their type of crime isn't a priority".

Researchers in the social sciences—such as Shamim Miah, Tufail Waqas, Muzammil Quraishi, Aisha K. Gill, Karen Harrison, Aviah Sarah Day, and others—have criticised the focus on race, religion and ethnicity by politicians and the media, describing the public discourse as a moral panic fuelled by sensationalist news reporting. They say this has portrayed Muslim and South Asian men as folk devils.

Community groups like the Muslim Women's network and the Muslim Council of Britain, argue that sensational media reporting is responsible for increasing Islamophobia. According to Miqdaad Versi, director for media monitoring at the Muslim Council of Britain, the media does this by "conflating the faith of Islam with criminality, such as the headlines 'Muslim sex grooming'". Right-wing figures, particularly Elon Musk in early 2025, have also been criticised of over-amplifying the issue in social media, with Musk describing safeguarding minister Jess Phillips as a "rape genocide apologist" over the issue. Musk's reaction came after Oldham Council asked the Home Office in mid-2014 to lead a fuller, government-run inquiry into long running abuse happening in the town of Oldham in the Greater Manchester, this request was refused by safeguarding minister Phillips in January 2025, saying that the decision to commission a local inquiry should rest with the council rather than central government.

Ella Cockbain, an associate professor in security and crime science at University College London, suggests that "the idea of a uniquely Asian crime threat is ill founded, misleading and dangerous", stating that assumptions of a racial motivation are unfounded while saying that "this disparity begs further exploration and, if possible, explanation". Cockbain writes that the concept of "grooming gangs" is ill-defined, defined based on unrepresentative samples to create a false narrative that Pakistani men are more likely to engage in child sexual abuse.

Public health and international studies scholars Yusra Ribhi Shawar, Phong Phu Truong and Jeremy Shiffman said that "the race element of the narrative" was amplified mainly by right-wing media, and sometimes individuals on the left, to "capitalize on wider anti-Muslim and xenophobic attitudes". They said that although this was "unhelpful", it had increased public awareness of the issue and led to increased government action on child abuse. Sociologists Gargi Bhattacharyya et al. state that the far-right has benefited from the politicisation of the issue, leading to a resurgence for far right groups. They suggest that the focus on race and ethnicity has also been at the expense of a deeper examination of other contributing factors, such as state neglect.

In 2013, BBC Inside Out London investigated allegations made by members of the Sikh community that British Sikh girls living inside Britain were being targeted by men who pretended to be Sikhs. An investigation by sociologist Katy Sian of the University of York had previously found no truth to such allegations and instead concluded that they were being promoted by extremist Sikh groups. Further reports compiled by the British government and child sex exploitation scholars also confirmed there was no evidence to this.

In April 2025, Channel 4 broadcast Groomed: A National Scandal, a documentary which revisited the theme of director Anna Hall's 2004 film Edge of the City and centred on the stories of survivors of sexual abuse and the shortcomings of local councils in addressing the issue.

== See also ==
- Rape culture
- Fiona Goddard
- Rotherham child sexual exploitation scandal
- Sammy Woodhouse
- Maggie Oliver
