= Child sexual abuse in the United Kingdom =

Child sexual abuse in the United Kingdom includes the proliferation of indecent images, online exploitation, transnational abuse, and contact abuse. Efforts to prevent child sexual abuse include providing information to children and parents, and disrupting abusive situations. Perpetrators may act alone or as part of a group or street gang, and may either exploit vulnerabilities in children and young people or have long-standing sexual attraction to children. Underreporting of child sexual abuse and low conviction rates remain barriers to justice, among other factors. In the UK, high-profile media coverage of child sexual abuse has often focused on cases of institutional and celebrity abuse, as well as offences committed by organized groups of sexual abusers.

Child sexual abuse has been reported in the country throughout its history. In about 90% of cases the abuser is a person known to the child. From the second half of the twentieth century, cases involving religious institutions, schools, popular entertainers, politicians, military personnel, and other officials have been widely publicised. Efforts to protect children from sexual abuse were recorded as early as the 11th century. Investigation and prevention of child sex abuse were impaired in the 21st century due to the impact of the government austerity programme. Since the start of the 21st century, media coverage and political discourse has also increasingly covered child abuse rings or "grooming gangs" operating in towns and cities across the UK, most notably in what is now known as the grooming gangs scandal.

In 2012, celebrity Jimmy Savile was posthumously identified as a prolific child sexual abuser over the previous six decades. Subsequent investigations, including those of Operation Yewtree, led to the conviction of several prominent "household names" in the media, allegations against prominent politicians, and calls for a public inquiry to establish what had been known by those responsible for the institutions where abuse had taken place. In July 2014, an Independent Inquiry into Child Sexual Abuse was announced by Theresa May, then British Home Secretary, to examine how the country's institutions have handled their duty of care to protect children from sexual abuse.

== Categories of child sexual abuse ==
The Child Exploitation and Online Protection Command identify four broad categories of child sexual abuse in the United Kingdom, which they describe as the four "key threats" to children.

- The proliferation of indecent images of children – particularly the production of still, moving and live-streaming of child abuse images. Live streaming of abuse of third world children for consumption by UK paedophiles is increasing. Perpetrators are being increasingly found and brought to justice. Tracking down and safeguarding third world child victims is more difficult.
- Online child sexual exploitation – with a focus on the systematic sexual exploitation of multiple child victims on the internet.
- Transnational child sexual abuse – including both transient and resident UK nationals and British citizens committing sexual offences abroad.
- Contact child sexual abuse – including the threat posed by organised crime-associated child sexual exploitation and the risks around missing children.

Within the category of contact sexual abuse, there are a number of recognised types. Firstly, contact child sexual abuse by lone offenders. Secondly, contact child sexual abuse by group offenders and offending associated with street gangs, of which there are two types. Within the group category, authorities describe two broad types:

- Type 1: Group offending targeting victim vulnerability. This includes street grooming gangs.
- Type 2: Group offending as a result of a specific sexual interest in children. This group have a long-standing sexual interest in children with some having a synergy with what has been described as a paedophile "ring".

== Statistics ==
The National Audit on Group-based Child Sexual Exploitation and Abuse (2025) said that around 500,000 children a year are likely to experience child sexual abuse of any kind in the UK, with one in five (100,000) incidents reported. Of the reported offences, 60% (60,000) are contact offences and 40% online. Of the contact offences, 28.5% (17,100) are flagged as child sexual exploitation.

In the UK, a 2010 study estimated prevalence at about 5% for boys and 18% for girls (not dissimilar to a 1985 study that estimated about 8% for boys and 12% for girls). Figures from 2009 to 2010 suggest girls are six times more likely to be assaulted than boys with 86% of attacks taking place against them. In 2014, the charity Barnardo's published a report that estimated that during 2008–2013, two thirds of victims were girls and one third were boys. Barnardo's were concerned that male victims may be overlooked. In 2020, the Centre of Expertise on Child Sexual Abuse said professionals faced difficulties "in identifying sexual abuse and acting on concerns about children from minority ethnic backgrounds".

=== Recorded offences ===
Reports of child sex abuse have increased in the UK. This may, in part, be due to greater willingness to report – between October 2013 and December 2017, reports to child protection experts had increased by 700%. The NSPCC reported a 31% increase between 2016 and 2017 alone. Between 2009 and 2010, more than 23,000 offences were recorded by the UK police. This number had almost doubled by 2016–17. The true number of offences remains doubtful, and is generally assumed to be larger, due to expected underreporting. Some 90% of the sexually abused children were abused by people who they knew, and about one out of every three abused children did not tell anyone else about it.

- England: In 2016–17 there were 43,522 recorded sexual offences against children under 16 years old, and a further 11,324 offences against young people aged over 16 and under 18. Police recorded 6,009 rapes of children aged under 13 years, and 6,299 rapes of children under 16 years.
- Wales: In 2016–17 there were 2,845 recorded sexual offences against children under 16 years old. Police recorded 446 rapes of children aged under 13 years, and 340 rapes of children under 16 years.
- Scotland: In 2016–17 there were 4,097 recorded sexual offences against children under 16 years old. Police recorded 196 rapes and attempted rapes of children aged 13–15 years, and 161 rapes and attempted rapes of children under 13 years.
- Northern Ireland: In 2016–17 there were 1,875 recorded sexual offences against children and young people under 18 years old. Police recorded 360 rapes and attempted rapes of children and young people aged under 18 years.
- Birmingham: According to a report by Birmingham City Council on September 30, 2026, there are 98 cases of child sexual exploitation under investigation in the city, six of which involve gang sexual exploitation. Birmingham Children's Trust has also announced that 143 children are at risk of or experiencing sexual exploitation. And 90.6 percent of identified victims are girls.

=== Offender demographics ===
The vast majority of child sex offenders in England and Wales are male, with men representing 82% of perpetrators of child sexual abuse and 90% of "contact" child sexual abuse in 2023. A 2025 report by the Centre of Expertise on Child Sexual Abuse said that the ethnic background of offenders was recorded in 69% of cases, of which 90% were white, 5% were Asian, 2% were Black, 2% were from mixed ethnic backgrounds and 1% were from "other" ethnic backgrounds. The Centre of Expertise on Child Sexual Abuse used statistics from the Ministry of Justice which show that white offenders are disproportionately over-represented in the numbers of defendants when compared to the 2021 Census which shows whites make up 81.7% of the general population in England and Wales, 9.3% identify as Asian, 4% identify as black, 2.2% identify as mixed race and 1% identify as 'other'.

According to the Ministry of Justice's prison population statistics, there were 8,345 convictions for child sexual abuse offences in 2020. Of this number, 43 did not have their ethnicity recorded. Of those with recorded ethnicity, white prisoners were the majority with a total of 7,353. 464 were Asian, 310 were black and 175 were mixed and "other". Of those with recorded ethnicity, white prisoners were disproportionately over-represented per capita. 88.5% were white, 5.5% were Asian, 4% were black and 2% were mixed/other.

In 2023, 115,489 child sexual abuse and exploitation crimes were recorded. Most cases of abuse occurred within the family or were committed by other children. Group-based child sexual exploitation accounted for 4,228 offences (3.7% of all cases), of which three-quarters involved two perpetrators and two-thirds involved direct contact (rather than occurring online). More than half of all group-based crimes were committed by other children and young people (57%): 9% of offenders were aged 9 or younger, 48% were aged 10–17, and the remaining 43% were adults. 717 (17%) were conducted by organised networks of criminals (so-called "grooming gangs").

== Sexual abuse prevention ==
In the 11th century, surviving ordinances of Canterbury Cathedral revealed that a process was in place to minimise opportunities for clergy guilty of past abuses to engage in further illicit sexual activities with minors. Several organisations in the United Kingdom work towards the goal of preventing sexual abuse, such as the National Society for the Prevention of Cruelty to Children (NSPCC) and the Lucy Faithfull Foundation. Prevention initiatives have traditionally involved providing information to children and parents about sexual abuse and how to prevent it. Other forms of prevention involve disruption activities where the children can be removed from the family home or area in which they are living, or work can be done to make it more difficult for people to sexually abuse children.

=== Barriers to prevention ===
Austerity led to cuts in policing so that the police no longer have the resources to investigate possible offences satisfactorily, or to safeguard potential victims. Nazir Afzal (formerly the Crown Prosecution Service lead on child sexual abuse and violence against women and girls) said, "Austerity has come at the wrong time. When finally voices are being heard, finally authorities are beginning to do their job properly and finally the NGO sector are being listened to, there isn't any money to go around. They are doing this with one hand behind their back. As a consequence, clearly people will not get justice". Nazir Afzal has also expressed concern that there are few prosecutions of grooming gangs in the south of England, fearing people in the south are not looking hard enough. Afzal said,

The perceptions is that northern towns and the Midlands have got a better handle on it, but London, the south-east, the south-west really are not focusing on it and claiming they don't have any problems. ... There have been hardly any cases south of Birmingham. What the hell is going on? Is it because there is no problem? I don't accept that at all. Is it because it's not a priority? I hope that's not true. I do think it's that thing about not turning over a stone.

In 2019, a BBC investigation reported that some privately run sexual assault referral centres (SARCs) were failing to examine young people who had experienced sexual assault in a timely fashion, jeopardising their ability to record forensic evidence. Victims' Commissioner Baroness Newlove said the failures were "shocking".

In 2023 Stephen Cottrell, archbishop of York, said that there was a crisis of safeguarding within the Church of England, due to church-related abuse. He said: "I imagine Jesus weeps over this situation ... And I know many of us are not far from those tears as well."

In November 2024, the U.K. government published the National review into child sexual abuse within the family environment, which sought to look at the "identification, assessment, and response to child sexual abuse within the family environment". It examined local child safeguarding practice reviews (LCSPRs), as well as 136 serious child safeguarding incidents and 41 serious case reviews (SCRs) related to these incidents to set out guidelines for local and national governments, as well as safeguarding partners across the country. The review said that there were "significant and long-standing issues" in reporting child sexual abuse within families, with children affected "frequently not being identified by practitioners" and not "receiving the response needed for their ongoing safety and recovery".

== Law and policy ==
The United Kingdom rewrote its criminal code in the Sexual Offences Act 2003. This Act includes definitions and penalties for child sexual abuse offences, and (so far as relating to offences) applies to England and Wales and Northern Ireland. The Scottish Law Commission published its review of rape and sexual offences in December 2007, which includes a similar consolidation and codification of child sexual abuse offences in Scotland.

In 2021, the government published its Tackling Child Sexual Abuse Strategy, which focussed on new technologies and legislation to prevent and police abuse.

== Group-based child sexual exploitation ==
According to the National Audit on Group-based Child Sexual Exploitation and Abuse (2025), 28.5% of cases of contact sexual abuse can be described as sexual exploitation (17,000 in 2024), whether by individuals or groups.

Group-based child sexual exploitation, localised grooming and grooming gangs are terms used to describe the sexual exploitation or grooming of children and adolescents by groups. Group-based child sexual exploitation was first defined in UK law in the Department for Children, Schools and Families' statutory guidance, Safeguarding Children & Young People from Sexual Exploitation. Supplementary guidance to Working Together to Safeguard Children in 2009. The National Audit on Group-based Child Sexual Exploitation and Abuse noted that there is a lack of data on group-based offences, with the Complex and Organised Child Abuse Dataset (COCAD) recording around 700 in 2023, i.e. 4% of the exploitation offences.

This abuse tends to target girls who are particularly vulnerable, such as those who are in local authority care.

== Inquiries ==
=== Butler-Sloss Inquiry ===
In 1987, a wave of suspected child sexual abuse cases were reported in Cleveland, England, many of which were later discredited. From February to July 1987, many children living in Cleveland were removed from their homes by social service agencies and diagnosed as sexually abused. The 121 diagnoses were made by two paediatricians at a Middlesbrough hospital, Marietta Higgs and Geoffrey Wyatt, using reflex anal dilation for diagnosis (later discredited).

When there were not enough foster homes in which to place the children, social services began to house the children in a ward at the local hospital. Later, the test used to establish child abuse was contested by the area police surgeon, and cooperation between the social workers, police and hospital doctors involved in diagnosis began to disintegrate. There was public concern regarding the practices being used by the local social service agency, such as the removal of children from their homes in the middle of the night. In May 1987, parents marched from the hospital where their children were being held to the local newspaper. The resulting media coverage caused the social service agency's practices to receive public scrutiny and criticism. Controversy increased when Mr Justice Hollis ruled that 19 of 20 children who had been made wards of the court should be returned to their parents due to the weakness of the medical evidence.

In response, the Butler-Sloss report was commissioned by the Secretary of State for Social Services in July 1987 and published in 1988. The report, led by Dame Elizabeth Butler-Sloss, concluded that most of the diagnoses were incorrect. Ninety-four of the 121 children were returned to their homes. An editorial in The Lancet concluded: "By their bull-headed approach, Dr Higgs and Dr Wyatt ... have set back the cause they sought to promote". In July 1988, six MPs tabled a House of Commons motion for charges of indecent assault and conspiracy to be brought against Higgs and Wyatt.

On 14 October 1991, the Children Act 1989 was implemented in full as a result of the Cleveland child abuse scandal and other child related events that preceded it.

=== Northern Ireland Historical Institutional Abuse Inquiry ===
The 2014–2016 Northern Ireland Historical Institutional Abuse Inquiry, often referred to as the HIA Inquiry, is the largest inquiry into historical institutional sexual and physical abuse of children in Northern Ireland legal history. Its remit covered institutions in Northern Ireland that provided residential care for children from 1922 to 1995, but excluded most church-run schools.

The inquiry concluded its hearings on 8 July 2016 and released its report on 20 January 2017. In October 2019 the House of Lords passed the Historical Institutional Abuse (Northern Ireland) Bill "to establish the Historical Institutional Abuse Redress Board and confer an entitlement to compensation...", and it was passed by the House of Commons as one of its last acts before the 2019 United Kingdom general election.

On 11 March 2022 ministers from the five main political parties in Northern Ireland and six abusing institutions made statements of apology in the Northern Ireland Assembly. A typical apology was "Today we, as representatives of the state, say that we are sorry ... that the state's systems failed to protect you from abuse". BBC News reported that Jon McCourt from Survivors North West said "If what happened today was the best that the church could offer by way of an apology they failed miserably. There was no emotion, there was no ownership. ... I don't believe that the church and institutions atoned today." He called on the intuitions to "do the right thing" and contribute to the redress fund for survivors, saying that institutions have done similar for people in Scotland. A board was set to represent all six institutions with a view to paying compensation to abuse victims. January 2025, four of the six institutions had taken no action towards making payments.

=== Independent Inquiry into Child Sexual Abuse ===
The Independent Inquiry into Child Sexual Abuse (IICSA) in England and Wales was an inquiry examining how the country's institutions handled their duty of care to protect children from sexual abuse. It was announced by the British Home Secretary, Theresa May, on 7 July 2014. It was set up after investigations in 2012 and 2013 into the Jimmy Savile sexual abuse scandal revealed widespread abuse, including historic claims (spanning several decades) against prominent media and political figures, and inadequate safeguarding by institutions and organisations. Originally the inquiry was intended to be a Panel Inquiry supported by experts, similar to the Hillsborough Independent Panel. After numerous objections related to the panel's scope and its independence from those being investigated, and the resignation of its first two intended chairs, the inquiry was reconstituted in February 2015 as a statutory inquiry under the Inquiries Act 2005, giving it greatly increased powers to compel sworn testimony and to examine classified information.

The first two chairs appointed to the original panel inquiry were Baroness Butler-Sloss (appointed 8 July 2014, stepped down 14 July 2014) and Fiona Woolf (appointed 5 September 2014, stepped down 31 October 2014). The reasons for their withdrawal in each case were objections related to their perceived closeness to individuals and establishments which would be investigated. On 4 February 2015, May announced that the inquiry would be chaired by Dame Lowell Goddard, a New Zealand High Court judge who had no ties to the UK bodies and persons likely to be investigated, and the existing panel was disbanded. Lowell Goddard resigned as chair in August 2016 and was replaced by Professor Alexis Jay, who had previously led the Independent Inquiry into Child Sexual Exploitation in Rotherham (or Jay Report).

The IICSA published 19 reports in all, with the last one coming on 20 October 2022, with many urgent recommendations. Home Secretary Suella Braverman said the Government of the United Kingdom "accepted the need to act on all but one of the Inquiry’s recommendations". As of December 2024, none of these recommendations had been implemented; the Ministry of Justice had closed a further consultation but published no response to the report.

==== Key recommendations ====
The 20 key recommendations from the Independent Inquiry into Child Sexual Abuse (IICSA) include:

- Creating a statutory requirement for people working or volunteering in positions of trust to report allegations of child sexual abuse.
- Establishing a national compensation scheme for people who have experienced child sexual abuse connected to an institution (state or non-state).
- Establishing two child protection authorities (one in England and one in Wales) to improve child protection practices and policies, and to advise government.
- Establishing a dedicated cabinet minister for child protection.
- Introducing a ban on pain-compliance techniques in prisons, detention centres and other custodial settings.
- Improving statutory duty compliance so the Disclosure and Barring Service (DBS) is informed about individuals potentially posing a risk to children.
- Ensuring better age-verification processes online.
- Issuing regular public awareness campaigns to inform the public on how to spot potential abuse and how to report it.
- Amending the Children Act 1989 to allow children to apply for a court order to prevent a local authority exercising its parental responsibilities over them.
- Establishing an independent body to register staff in care homes, set and enforce professional standards, and provide training.
- Registration of staff at young offender institutes and secure training centres.
- Allow anyone working with children to see if they have been barred by the DBS.
- Extend disclosure requirements to those working with children overseas.
- Require all regulated search service providers and user-to-user services to pre-screen online content for known child sexual abuse material.
- Establish joint inspection of the victims' code to ensure it provides the minimum level of service for survivors of child sexual abuse.
- Ending the three-year limitation on personal injury claims for survivors of child sexual abuse.
- Providing guaranteed, fully-funded therapeutic support by specialists to all survivors of child sexual abuse.
- Establishing a code of practice which provides access to records related to child sexual abuse and ensures they are retained for 75 years.
- Updating the criminal injuries compensation scheme to cover a broader range of child sexual abuse and to extend the time limit for survivors to apply.
- Improving data collection by creating a single set of core data for all child sexual abuse cases.

==== November 2020 report on Catholic Church ====
In November 2020, the Independent Inquiry into Child Sexual Abuse published its 144-page report, Safeguarding in the Roman Catholic Church in England and Wales. The report said the Catholic Church of England and Wales "swept under the carpet" allegations of sex abuse by many individuals, including priests, monks and volunteers, in England and Wales. The report said that Vincent Nichols, a cardinal since 2014 and the leader of the Catholic church in England and Wales, made "no acknowledgement of any personal responsibility", protected the reputation of the Church rather than protecting victims, and lacked compassion towards victims.

On 2 September 2021, the inquiry published Child protection in religious organisations and settings - Investigation Report, after examining evidence from 38 groups, including sects from Christianity, Orthodox Judaism, and Islam. The report said there were "shocking failings" and "blatant hypocrisy" in the way major UK religious groups handled child sex abuse allegations. It also said that some religious organisations were "morally failing" children, discouraging the reporting of abuse to protect reputations, blaming victims for their abuse, and responding to allegations using religious dogma.

=== Scottish Child Abuse Inquiry ===
The Scottish Child Abuse Inquiry was established in October 2015 to inquire into cases of child abuse in care in Scotland. Retired judge Lady Anne Smith was appointed as chairwoman of the inquiry in July 2016. She is supported by a secretariat team, a legal team and legal council. Prior to the appointment of Smith, the inquiry had a chair, Susan O'Brien, and two panel members, Michael Lamb and Glen Houston. Lamb resigned because of the Scottish government continued interference. The inquiry investigated over 100 locations of over 50 residential care establishments for children where there were child abuse claims. Between 2018 and 2021 the inquiry issued several reports including four case reports on care homes in Scotland.

Abuse survivors have called on the Scottish Child Abuse Inquiry remit to be widened out to include victims who were targeted outwith residential care, including sports and leisure clubs or faith based organisations attended on a day-to-day basis. Lady Smith rejected this request. Those affected by childhood sexual abuse have called for new laws of mandatory reporting to be implemented in Scotland. This would be a legal requirement for those who work with children or in law enforcement to report child sexual abuse, and is already law in many other countries in the world. The Scottish Child Abuse Inquiry has given no indication if they will support this law reform.

The inquiry was to report and make recommendations by 2019. This deadline was later changed to "as soon as reasonably practicable". A transcript contract extension indicates the inquiry hearings could run until February 2025, with a possible extension to February 2026. Then the report would need to be written. Concerns have been raised about mounting costs and delays in the inquiry. In September 2021, Lady Smith released a report which was critical of the previous Scottish government for the 'woeful and avoidable' delay in setting up the inquiry. As of January 2025, after nearly eight years of the inquiry, it still has not published its recommendations.

=== Independent Inquiry into Grooming Gangs ===
On 14 June 2025, Prime Minister Keir Starmer announced that the government would launch a full national statutory inquiry into grooming gangs, following the recommendations of the Casey audit, which found that the ethnicity of gangs had been "shied away from". Noting that ethnicity data collected for victims and perpetrators of group-based child sexual exploitation was "not sufficient to allow any conclusions to be drawn at the national level", the report said "there have been enough convictions across the country of groups of men from Asian ethnic backgrounds to have warranted closer examination". Casey said there had been institutional "obfuscation" instead of "examination".

On 9 December 2025, Home Secretary Shabana Mahmood made a statement to Parliament announcing the Independent Inquiry into Grooming Gangs, its panel with Baroness Anne Longfield as its chair, and draft terms of reference to be confirmed no later than March 2026.

== Notable incidents ==
- Amberdale children's home
- Aylesbury child sex abuse ring
- Banbury child sex abuse ring
- Beechwood children's home – A care home where 136 former residents reported being sexually abused, which police believe is "the small tip of a very large iceberg".
- Berkhamsted paedophile network – A gang led from Berkhamsted in Hertfordshire that was stopped in 2016.
- Birmingham bathing cult
- Bristol child sex abuse ring
- Derby child sex abuse ring
- Eliza Armstrong case – a late 19th-century child sexual abuse scandal that led to the passing of the Criminal Law Amendment Act 1885, which raised the age of consent from 13 to 16.
- Halifax child sex abuse ring
- Huddersfield grooming gang
- Ian Watkins child sexual abuse scandal
- Islington Children's Homes
- Jersey child abuse investigation
- Jimmy Savile sexual abuse scandal. See also Operation Yewtree, the police investigation into abuse by Savile and others.
- Keighley child sex abuse ring
- Kesgrave Hall School
- Kidwelly sex cult
- Kincora Boys' Home – the scandal first came to public attention on 24 January 1980 after a news report in the Irish Independent titled it as "Sex Racket at Children's Home".
- Manchester child sex abuse ring
- Manchester Children's Homes
- Mark Trotter Affair
- Medomsley Detention Centre – A youth prison in the 1960s, 1970s, and 1980 where over 1,800 former inmates were subjected to serious sexual and physical abuse by prison guards.
- Murder of Alesha MacPhail
- Newcastle child sex abuse ring
- North Wales child abuse scandal – Scandal leading to a three-year, £13 million investigation into the physical and sexual abuse of children in care homes in the counties of Clwyd and Gwynedd, in North Wales, including the Bryn Estyn children's home at Wrexham, between 1974 and 1990.
- North West Hebephile Hunters forms
- Norwich sexual abuse ring
- Nottingham Care Homes
- Operation Lakeland – A successful 2007-2010 police investigation into a ring of six men in Cornwall who had "abused at least 30 girls", including at least one as young as five.
- Operation Voicer – A successful police investigation into sexual abuse of babies and infants across England.
- Oxford child sex abuse ring
- Peterborough sex abuse case
- Plymouth child abuse case – paedophile ring involving at least five adults from different parts of England
- Rochdale child sex abuse ring. See also Operation Doublet, an ongoing investigation by Greater Manchester Police.
- Rotherham child sexual exploitation scandal – widespread child exploitation in Rotherham, South Yorkshire, England, between 1997 and 2013, estimated to have involved at least 1400 children who were subjected to 'appalling' sexual exploitation by gangs of men. An investigation into the abuse was commissioned, called the Independent Inquiry into Child Sexual Exploitation in Rotherham or Jay Report.
- 2019 South Wales paternal sex abuse case
- Telford child sexual exploitation scandal
- United Kingdom football sexual abuse scandal – started in November 2016 when former professional footballers waived their rights to anonymity and talked publicly about abuse by former football coaches in the 1970s, 1980s and 1990s. The initial allegations centred on Crewe Alexandra and Manchester City.
- Westminster paedophile dossier – A dossier on paedophiles allegedly associated with the British government

== See also ==
- Child abuse
- Northern Ireland Historical Institutional Abuse Inquiry
- Scottish Child Abuse Inquiry
- Sexual offences in the United Kingdom

== Sources ==
- Cockbain, Ella (April 2013). "Grooming and the 'Asian sex gang predator': the construction of a racial crime threat". Race & Class. 54 (4): 22–32. doi:10.1177/0306396813475983.
- Cockbain, Ella; Tufail, Waqas (2020). "Failing victims, fuelling hate: Challenging the harms of the 'Muslim grooming gangs' narrative". Race & Class. 61 (3): 3–32. doi:10.1177/0306396819895727. S2CID 214197388. Archived from the original on 8 March 2021.
- Gill, Aisha K.; Day, Aviah Sarah (30 November 2020). "Moral Panic in the Media: Scapegoating South Asian Men in Cases of Sexual Exploitation and Grooming". In Ramon, Shulamit; Lloyd, Michele; Penhale, Bridget (eds.). Gendered Domestic Violence and Abuse in Popular Culture. Emerald Publishing Limited. pp. 171–197. doi:10.1108/978-1-83867-781-720201011. ISBN 978-1-83867-782-4.
- Gill, Aisha K; Harrison, Karen (1 July 2015). "Child Grooming and Sexual Exploitation: Are South Asian Men the UK Media's New Folk Devils?". International Journal for Crime, Justice and Social Democracy. 4 (2): 34–49. doi:10.5204/ijcjsd.v4i2.214. ISSN 2202-8005.
- Hanson, Martin (2018). "Muslim grooming gangs". The Open Society. 91 (4): 5–10.
- Meyer, Anneke (30 June 2015). "The Rotherham abuse scandal". In Cree, Viviene E.; Clapton, Gary; Smith, Mark (eds.). Revisiting Moral Panics. Policy Press. pp. 113–122. doi:10.51952/9781447321873.ch010. ISBN 978-1-4473-2187-3.
- Miah, Shamim (18 April 2015). "The Groomers and the Question of Race". Identity Papers: A Journal of British and Irish Studies. 1 (1): 54–66. doi:10.5920/idp.2015.1154. ISSN 2058-6205.
- Quraishi, Muzammil (2016). "Child sexual exploitation and young British Muslim men: a modern moral panic?". Young British Muslims. London: Routledge. pp. 36–48.
- Shawar, Yusra Ribhi; Truong, Phong Phu; Shiffman, Jeremy (1 June 2022). "The emergence of political priority for addressing child sexual abuse in the United Kingdom". Child Abuse & Neglect. 128 (105601): 8–9. doi:10.1016/j.chiabu.2022.105601. ISSN 0145-2134. PMID 35381546.
- Sparrow, Andrew (8 January 2025). "Tory and Reform MPs accused of 'weaponising trauma' of grooming victims, as Farage calls for inquiry to focus on Pakistani men – as it happened". The Guardian. ISSN 0261-3077.
- Tufail, Waqas (2015). "Rotherham, Rochdale, and the Racialised threat of the 'Muslim grooming gang'". International Journal for Crime, Justice and Social Democracy. 4 (3): 30–43. doi:10.5204/ijcjsd.v4i3.249.
- Tufail, Waqas; Poynting, Scott (2016). "Muslim and dangerous: 'Grooming' and the politics of racialisation". Fear of Muslims? International Perspectives on Islamophobia. pp. 79–92.
- Wroe, Lauren Elizabeth; Vaughn, Leona (April 2025). "Race, class and the weaponisation of child safety". Critical and Radical Social Work (editorial). 13 (2): 148–154. doi:10.1332/20498608Y2025D000000074.
