= Sammy Woodhouse =

English victims' rights activist

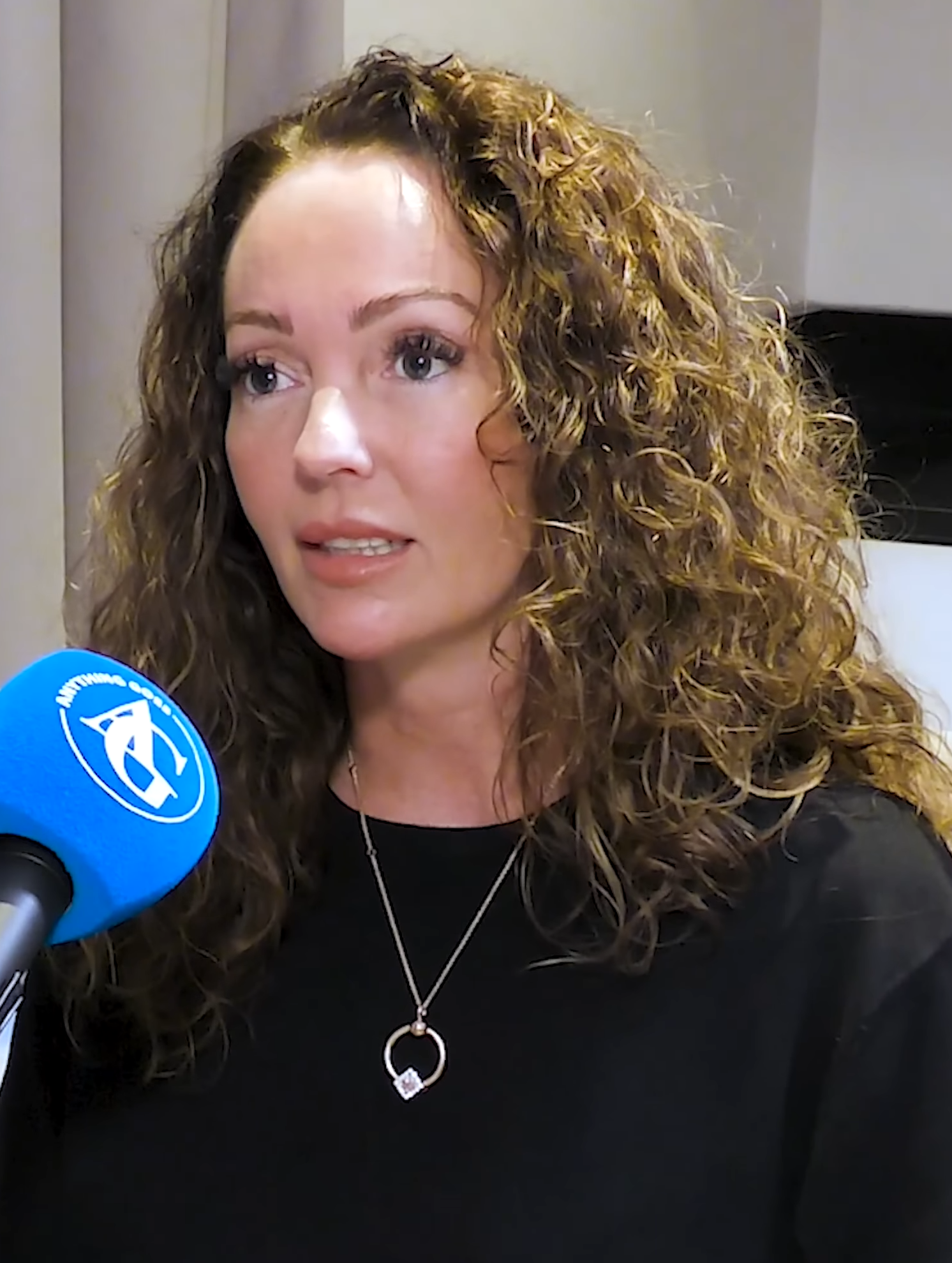
- Woodhouse in 2024
- Born: 20 June 1985 (age 41)
- Known for: Activism against child sexual abuse
- Notable work: Just A Child: Britain's Biggest Child Abuse Scandal Exposed
- Children: 2

Sammy Woodhouse (born 20 June 1985) is a political commentator and an activist against child sexual abuse. She is often credited as being an important part of the exposure of the grooming gangs in Rotherham, after giving an anonymous interview about her experiences to Andrew Norfolk of The Times. Woodhouse has actively supported pardoning child sexual abuse victims for crimes they were coerced into committing.

== Personal life ==
Sammy Woodhouse grew up with her two older sisters in Rotherham. Her family had a caravan in Cleethorpes. Woodhouse competed with her dance team until it was disbanded.

When she was 14 years old, Woodhouse was groomed by 24-year-old Arshid Hussain, the leader of a child sexual exploitation gang, who had been married and had two children. Hussain started raping Woodhouse a month after they met and subsequently raped, assaulted, and beat Woodhouse on a daily basis. According to her, Hussain would threaten her with a gun and threaten to kill her family. Woodhouse said that Hussain colluded with some police officers and that she was charged with crimes she and Hussein committed jointly. For example, when she turned 15, Hussain forced her to rob a post office. The police raided Hussain's house a few days later, while he and Woodhouse were in bed. Hussain was not arrested, but Woodhouse was charged with possessing a baton. A few months later, Hussain made Woodhouse fight a girl, and Woodhouse was convicted of assault.

Woodhouse became pregnant twice when she was 15 years old; Hussain pressured her to have an abortion the first time. Woodhouse's mother died several days after Hussain was injured badly in a gang incident. She missed much of her education and had a criminal record, so began working as a model, stripper and lap dancer. After another abusive relationship, Woodhouse moved back in with Hussain, who was in a wheelchair, with her second son. However, his family wanted to take her older son, so she fled again. Woodhouse's son became involved in crime and drugs, and she attempted to place him in care.

Woodhouse kept being abused for years, including an assault by Hussain in public, which was dismissed by the police, and her flat was set on fire. Her family members had to move because they were also continuously threatened and terrorized. When she understood in 2012 that she had been groomed, Woodhouse developed depression, suicidal thoughts, and an eating disorder.

Woodhouse anonymously approached The Times in 2013, leading to the Jay inquiry, which played a crucial part in exposing the scale and nature of child sexual exploitation in Rotherham. The report by social worker Alexis Jay found that more than 1,400 children were victims of child sexual abuse in Rotherham between 1997 and 2013. Woodhouse has said that she was shocked when she learned the number of victims. Hussain was convicted of multiple crimes, including serial rape and abduction of multiple girls, and was sentenced to 35 years in prison.

In March 2017, Woodhouse revealed her name on a BBC programme. In mid-2017, Woodhouse was one of hundreds of child sexual abuse victims who were initially denied compensation by the Criminal Injuries Compensation Authority.

In June 2026, the results of an inquiry headed by Woodhouse were released titled The Rape Gang Inquiry Report, investigating child sexual abuse beginning from the 1950's onwards.

== Activism ==
Woodhouse conducts speaking events at schools and elsewhere, explaining to teenagers, the police and social workers how to recognise that someone is being groomed. Woodhouse wrote a book, Just a Child: Britain's Biggest Child Abuse Scandal Exposed, which was released in April 2018.

According to Woodhouse, Rotherham Council invited Hussain to meet their son despite his conviction for rape. Subsequently, in November 2018, more than three hundred thousand people signed a petition by Woodhouse and Labour MP Louise Haigh, which called for the amendment of the Children Act 1989 to "ban any male with a child conceived by rape from applying for access/rights".

Woodhouse has recently become a member of the right-wing political party Restore Britain.

=== Sammy's Law ===
Woodhouse supports Sammy's Law, a bill named after her, which would pardon child sexual abuse victims for crimes they were coerced into committing; the bill would also remove the crimes committed by the children from their criminal records. The bill was supported by Vera Baird, the Northumbria Police and Crime Commissioner, by Alan Billings, the South Yorkshire Police and Crime Commissioner, by Anne Longfield, the Children's Commissioner for England, and by Simon Bailey, the Chief Constable of the Norfolk Constabulary, among several other chief constables and crime commissioners. Woodhouse has met with Conservative MP Victoria Atkins. In 2018, a High Court action was won by Woodhouse and two other women with juvenile offence records that are provided by the Disclosure and Barring Service. They were represented by solicitor Harriet Wistrich. In 2019, the government said that it would appeal the decision. According to Woodhouse, the government has "done nothing" to tackle the issue.

== See also ==
- Child sexual abuse in the United Kingdom
- Grooming gangs scandal
- Rotherham child sexual exploitation scandal
