= Rotherham child sexual exploitation scandal =

Sexual abuse scandal in England

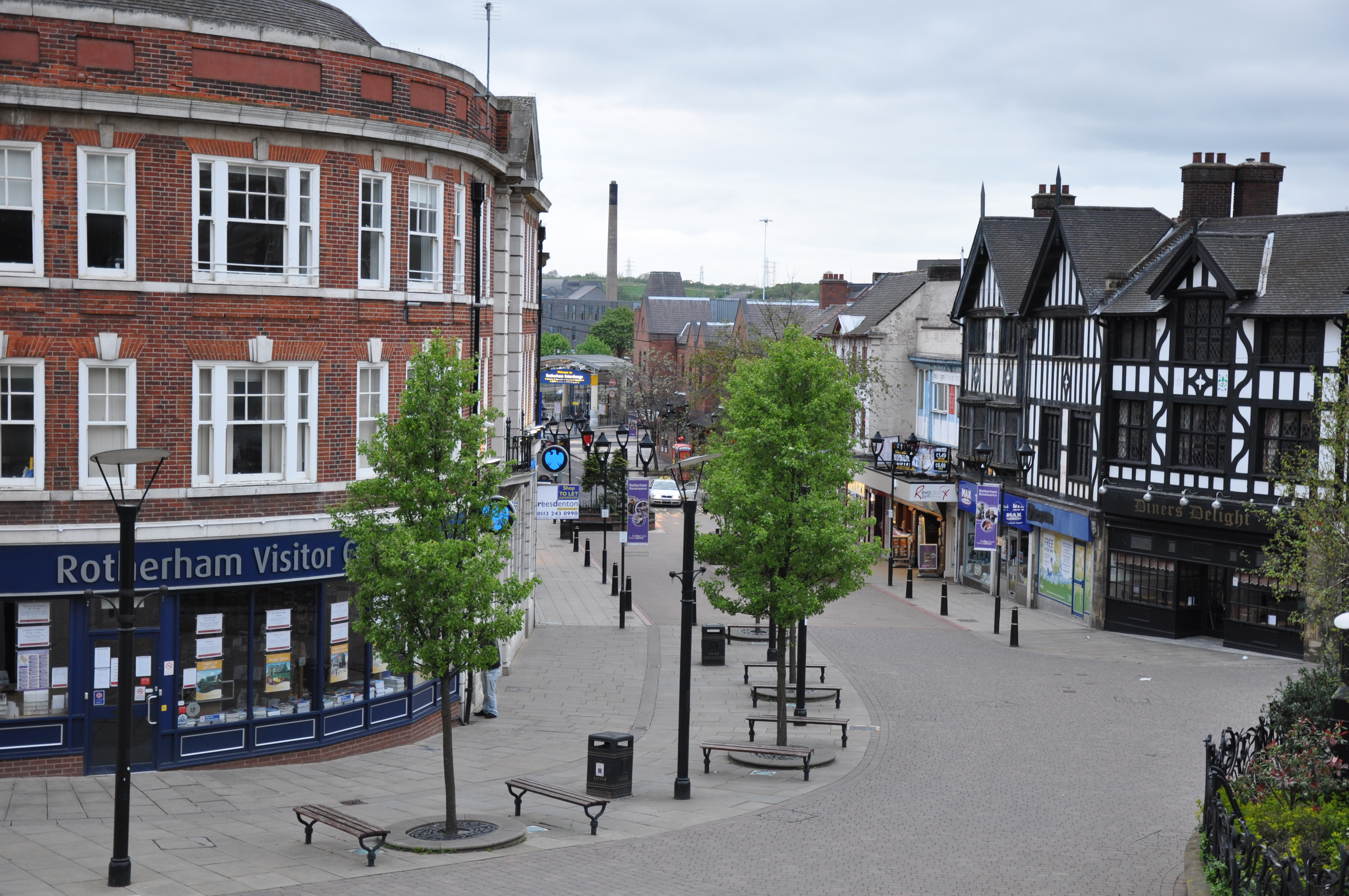
- Rotherham town centre, March 2010
- Date: 1970s–present
- Location: Rotherham, South Yorkshire, England; 53.430°N 1.357°W
- Reporter: Andrew Norfolk of The Times, with information from Jayne Senior, youth worker
- Inquiries: Home Affairs Committee (2013–2014); Jay inquiry (2014); Casey inquiry (2015)
- Convictions: c. 60 (rising) Operation Central: 5 men Operation Clover: 18 men & 2 women Operation Stovewood: 39 men (trials ongoing as of February 2025) (Note: Operation Stovewood says 39.)
- Awards: Andrew Norfolk: Orwell Prize (2013), Journalist of the Year (2014); Jayne Senior: MBE (2016 Birthday Honours)
- Events: Child sexual abuse of an estimated 1,400 (1970s–2013, according to various reports including Jayne Senior) majority aged approximately 11–16.
- Trials: Sheffield Crown Court, 2010, 2016–2017, convictions for rape, conspiracy to rape, aiding and abetting rape, sexual intercourse with a girl under 13, indecent assault, false imprisonment, procurement. Numerous individual prosecutions regarding child sexual exploitation over the years, including 8 in 2012, 9 in 2013, and 1 in the first quarter of 2014

From the late 1980s until 2013, group-based child sexual exploitation affected an estimated 1,400 girls, generally from care home backgrounds, in the town of Rotherham, South Yorkshire, England. Between 1997 and 2013, girls were abused by grooming gangs predominantly consisting of men of Pakistani heritage. Researcher Angie Heal, who was hired by local officials and warned them about child exploitation occurring between 2002 and 2007, has since described it as the "biggest child protection scandal in UK history". In July 2025, investigations were being carried out into allegations that police officers had also raped child victims.

Evidence of the abuse was first noted in the early 1990s, when care home managers investigated reports that children in their care were being picked up by taxi drivers. From at least 2001, multiple reports passed names of alleged perpetrators, several from one family, to the police and Rotherham Council. The first group conviction took place in 2010, when five British-Pakistani men were convicted of sexual offences against girls aged 12–16. From January 2011, The Times covered the issue, discovering that the abuse had been known by local authorities for over ten years. (Note: Andrew Norfolk began investigating in 2010. The first of his articles appeared over four pages in The Times in January 2011, accompanied by an editorial. Andrew Norfolk (The Times, 24 September 2012): "Confidential police reports and intelligence files ... show that for more than a decade organised groups of men were able to groom, pimp and traffic girls across the country with virtual impunity. Offenders were identified to police but not prosecuted.")

Following these reports, alongside the 2012 trial of the Rochdale child sex abuse ring, the House of Commons Home Affairs Committee conducted hearings and published its recommendations in six reports. Alexis Jay led an independent inquiry, known as the Jay report, which found multiple failings of the police and local authorities. Girls would be regularly taken in taxis to be abused, and were gang raped, forced to watch rape, threatened, and trafficked to other towns. The resultant pregnancies, miscarriages, and terminations caused further trauma to the victims. Most victims were White British girls but British Asian girls were also targeted. British Asian girls may have feared social isolation and dishonour had they reported their experiences. Failure to address the abuse has been linked to factors such as fear of racism allegations due to the perpetrators' ethnicity; sexist and classist attitudes towards the mostly working-class victims; lack of a child-centred focus; a desire to protect the town's reputation; and lack of training and resources.

Following the Jay report, Rotherham Council's chief executive, its director of children's services, as well as the Police and Crime Commissioner for South Yorkshire Police all resigned. The Independent Police Complaints Commission and the National Crime Agency both opened inquiries. Rotherham Council was also investigated and found "not fit for purpose". Nineteen men and two women were convicted in 2016 and 2017 of sexual offences in the town dating back to the late 1980s.

== Background ==
=== Rotherham ===
The Metropolitan Borough of Rotherham within South Yorkshire and England

Rotherham is the largest town within the Metropolitan Borough of Rotherham in South Yorkshire, with a population of 109,691 in the 2011 census. (Note: Other towns within the borough are Dinnington, Laughton, Maltby, Rawmarsh, Swinton, and Wath-upon-Dearne.) Around 11.9 per cent of Rotherham's population belonged to black and minority ethnic groups, compared to eight per cent of the population of the borough (population 258,400); three per cent of the population of the borough belonged to the Pakistani-heritage community. Unemployment in the borough was above the national average, and 23 per cent of homes consisted of social housing. The area has traditionally been a Labour stronghold. Until Sarah Champion was elected in 2012, it had never had a female MP. The council was similarly both controlled by Labour and male-dominated. (Note: One Labour insider told The Guardian in 2012: "The Rotherham political class is male, male, male.")

=== Terminology ===
In 2009, the Department for Education began using the term child sexual exploitation (CSE) to replace the term child prostitution, which implied consent. CSE is a form of child sexual abuse in which children are offered something—monetary or otherwise—for sexual activity, with violence and intimidation common. CSE includes online grooming, and localised grooming which typically happens in a public place. Targets of abuse sometimes include children cared after by the local authority, as was particularly common in the Rotherham case. In CSE, children may be contacted initially by another child, who hands the target to an older man. The adult then enters into a "relationship" with the target, but often the girl is used for sex by a larger group, in some cases leading to group rape. Trafficking is common, with the child "sold" to other groups. According to one victim, targets are preferably 12–14; the group loses interest as the child ages and expects the child to supply other, younger children.

== History ==
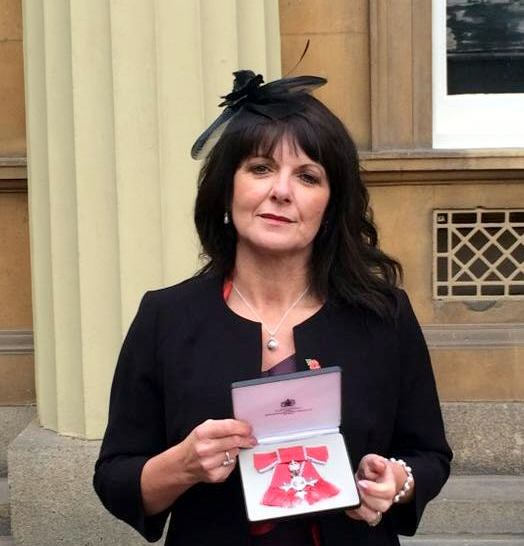
Jayne Senior, formerly of Risky Business, after receiving an MBE in 2016 for her work

From the early 1990s, several managers of local children's homes set up the "taxi driver group" to investigate reports that taxis driven by Pakistani men were arriving at care homes to take the children away. The police reportedly declined to act. In 1997, Rotherham Council created Risky Business, a local project to work with girls and women aged 11–25 at risk of sexual exploitation on the streets. Jayne Senior, awarded an MBE for her role in uncovering the abuse, began working for Risky Business as a coordinator around July 1999.

Around 2001, Senior began to find evidence of a localised grooming network. Most Risky Business clients had previously come from Sheffield, which had a red-light district; now the girls were younger and came from Rotherham. Girls as young as 10 were being befriended, perhaps by children their own age, before being passed to older men who would rape them and become their "boyfriends". Many of the girls were from troubled families, but not all. The children were given alcohol and drugs, then told they had to repay the "debt" by having sex with other men. The perpetrators obtained personal information about the girls and their families—where their parents worked, for example—which was used to threaten the girls if they tried to withdraw. (Note: Janice Turner (The Times, 19 March 2016): "The older men made them feel special with presents and questions about their lives. The girls—trusting, guileless children—would reveal where their parents worked, all about their friends and pets, where their granny lived. ... Once the girl was ensnared, this attentive boyfriend would turn nasty. He'd say he needed money, the girl must repay drinks and presents with favours. She must sleep with his friend, or brother, come to a certain house ... The beatings would start, then the threats. "Tell anyone and we'll hurt your mum. You told us where she lives ..." One girl said: "They used to follow my mum because they used to know when she went shopping, what time she had been shopping, where she had gone." A 15-year-old was told she was "one bullet" away from death. Girls were doused in petrol and told they were about to die. When she told her "pimp" that she was pregnant and did not know who the father was, one 15-year-old was beaten unconscious with a clawhammer. A 12-year-old with a 24-year-old "boyfriend" had a mother who invited the perpetrators into the family home, where the girl would give the men oral sex for 10 cigarettes.) According to Senior, Risky Business gathered so much information about the perpetrators that the police suggested she forward it to an electronic dropbox on the South Yorkshire Police computer network to protect the identity of Risky Business's sources. She later learned the police had not read the reports, and they could not be accessed by other forces. Risky Business was seen as a "nuisance" and shut down by the council in 2011.

In July 2025 it was reported that five survivors of abuse had said that they were also raped by police officers when they were as young as 12. Three former police officers were arrested as part of an investigation, and another had died. The women accused corrupt police officers of turning a blind eye or participating in the grooming.

== Criminal proceedings and convictions ==
Criminal proceedings are ongoing and expected to continue until 2027. The Independent Inquiry into Child Sexual Abuse said assumptions that abuse had fallen since high-profile cases in Rotherham and Rochdale were "flawed", and that children were still being sexually exploited in all parts of England and Wales in the "most degrading and destructive ways".

=== Operation Central (2010) ===
In 2008, South Yorkshire Police set up Operation Central to investigate the allegations. Eight men were tried at Sheffield Crown Court in October 2010 for sexual offences against girls aged 12–16. Four victims testified. Five men were convicted, including two brothers and a cousin. One of the brothers, Razwan Razaq, had a previous conviction for indecently assaulting a young girl in his car, and had breached a previous sexual offences prevention order. His brother Umar appealed against his sentence and was released after nine months. All five were placed on the sex offenders' register.

=== Operation Clover, trials (2015–2017) ===
==== Initial convictions (December 2015) ====
In August 2013, South Yorkshire Police set up Operation Clover to investigate historic cases of child sexual abuse in the town. Six men and two women were tried on 10 December 2015 at Sheffield Crown Court. Four were members of the Hussain family—three brothers and their uncle, Qurban Ali—named in Adele Weir's 2001 report. The Hussain family were said to have "owned" Rotherham. Ali owned a local minicab company, Speedline Taxis. One of the accused women had worked for Speedline as a radio operator. On 24 February 2016, Ali was convicted of conspiracy to rape and sentenced to 10 years.

Arshid "Mad Ash" Hussain, reportedly the ringleader, was jailed for 35 years. In late 2018, Arshid Hussain sought visitation rights for his child, who was conceived during a rape. Sammy Woodhouse, the child's mother, started a petition to change the Children's Act 1989 to deny access rights to rapists. The petition obtained over 200,000 signatures. Basharat "Bash" Hussain was sentenced to 25 years, and was later also convicted of indecent assault and given an additional seven-year sentence, to run concurrently. Bannaras "Bono" Hussain was jailed for 19 years. The court heard that the police had once caught Bannaras Hussain abusing a victim in a car park next to Rotherham police station, but had not taken action. Two other men were acquitted, one of seven charges, including four rapes, and the second of one charge of indecent assault.

In November 2016, a fourth Hussain brother, Sageer Hussain, was jailed for 19 years for four counts of raping a 13-year-old girl and one indecent assault. The girl's family had reported the rapes at the time to police, their MP, and David Blunkett, the home secretary, to no avail. The police collected bags of clothes the girl had saved as evidence, but lost them two days later. The family was sent £140 compensation for the clothes and advised to drop the case. Unable to find anyone to help them, they moved to Spain for 18 months in 2005. Two cousins of the Hussains, Asif Ali and Mohammed Whied, were convicted of rape and aiding and abetting rape, respectively. Four other men were jailed for rape or indecent assault.

Karen MacGregor and Shelley Davies were convicted of false imprisonment and conspiracy to procure prostitutes. MacGregor, who had worked as a radio operator at Speedline Taxis, was sentenced to 13 years. Davies was given an 18-month suspended sentence. MacGregor and Davies befriended girls and took them to MacGregor's home, where they bought them food, clothes, and alcohol. The girls were told to earn their keep by having sex with male visitors. MacGregor had previously applied for charitable status for a local group she had set up, Kin Kids, to help the carers of troubled teenagers.

Eight men went on trial in September 2016 and were convicted on 17 October that year. In January 2017, six men, including three brothers, went on trial and were convicted of 21 offences relating to assaults on two girls, aged 12 and 13 when the abuse began, between 1999 and 2001. A rape by Basharat Dad was reported to the police in 2001 but he had been released without charge. One of the girls became pregnant at age 12. She had been raped by five men and did not know who the father was. DNA tests established that it was one of the defendants. In May 2017, another man was found guilty of sexual offences, bringing the total to 26.

=== Operation Stovewood (from 2014) ===
In December 2014, the National Crime Agency (NCA) set up Operation Stovewood to conduct a criminal inquiry, and to review South Yorkshire Police investigations in Rotherham between 1997 and 2013. This followed the release of the Jay Report in August 2014 which found a number of failures by South Yorkshire Police. Similar failings were reported by the subsequent Drew report in March 2016. It had been described as the single largest law enforcement investigation into non-familial child sexual exploitation and abuse in the UK. The NCA stopped taking on new investigations on 1 January 2024 after identifying more than 1,100 victims and hundreds of perpetrators in their nine-year investigation. Criminal cases are expected to be ongoing until 2027.

==== 2017–2019 ====
In November 2017, three men were convicted for the indecent assault of a girl under the age of 14 between June 1994 and June 1995. Asghar Bostan was convicted in February 2018, followed by Tony Chapman and a sixth man, both in May 2018. In 2018, five men were charged with a total of 21 offences, including rape and indecent assault against two girls under the age of sixteen between 2001 and 2004. The girls were groomed in and around the Meadowhall shopping centre when they were 12 or 13, and one of the accused had sex with a girl in the shopping complex. Three of the men were found not guilty on all counts. A fourth man absconded but was arrested in Bulgaria in November 2023 and extradited back to the UK. After his conviction, Asghar Bostan was ordered by the High Court to pay £425,000 in damages to his victim. The complainant, known only as Liz, started civil proceedings against her abuser in 2020 after she felt the justice system had failed to sufficiently punish her attacker. Her solicitor Robin Tilbrook described it as an "ice-breaker" case, which would allow "others to follow".

In October 2018, taxi driver Darren Hyett was sentenced to nine years in prison for sexual activity with a 15-year-old girl. Later that month, seven men were convicted of sexual offences against five girls committed between 1998 and 2005, including two who raped a young girl in Sherwood Forest between August 2002 and 2003, giving her drugs and alcohol and threatening to abandon her if she did not comply. The girl became pregnant and decided to have an abortion. One girl said she had been assaulted by 100 men by the time she was 16.

In August 2019, seven men were convicted for the sexual exploitation of seven teenage girls over a decade previously. Four were already in prison at the time of sentencing. Takeaway delivery driver Aftab Hussain was sentenced to 24 years for indecent assault after being jailed for 3 years and 4 months back in April 2016 after he admitted two counts of sexual activity with a child and attempted witness intimidation in another case. Masaued Malik was sentenced to 5 years after being previously sentenced to 15 years in September 2016 for similar offences. Mohammed Ashen pleaded guilty to three counts of indecent assault, and was already serving a 17-year sentence, reduced from 19 years, for murdering Kimberley Fuller in a Rotherham nightclub in 2005. He had previously been jailed for threatening a former partner with a knife. Waseem Khaliq was sentenced to 10 years in prison and then sentenced for a further 45 months after admitting three counts of witness intimidation. He also called the National Crime Agency control centre from prison to threaten two of the investigating officers.

==== 2023–2025 ====
In November 2023, Neil Cawton was jailed for 10 years for offences against four girls between 2006 and 2012. In December 2023, Ishtiaq Khaliq was sentenced to a further 2 years after originally being jailed for 17 years in 2016. In May 2024, Mohammed Imran Ali Akhtar was jailed for a further 12 years after being jailed for 23 years in October 2018. In July 2024, Adam Ali, previously known as Razwan Razaq, was sentenced to 13 years for offences relating to two victims. Ali was jailed for 11 years in 2010 under Operation Central for similar offences. That same month, Neil King was found guilty of 17 sexual offences against a girl and jailed for 21 years. King's girlfriend was charged alongside him, but died before her trial.

In August 2024, David Saynor, 77, was jailed for 24 years for sexual offences against eight victims after picking them up from outside schools and care homes in his stretch limousine. In September 2024, Mohammed Amar, Mohammed Siyab, Yasser Ajaibe, Mohammed Zameer Sadiq were found guilty of assaulting one girl, while Tahir Yasin and Ramin Bari were convicted of assaulting a second. Abid Saddiq, who abused both, had previously been found guilty in 2019. The two girls, aged 11 and 15, were in the care system when the abuse started. That same month, Waleed Ali was convicted for raping a girl, aged 14, in a dark alleyway around 2003 to 2004, when in his 20s. Ali had a previous conviction from Operation Clover in 2016 of raping a 13 year old girl in the same alleyway in 2003. Shahid Hussain, a Pakistani national, was given eight years and a deportation order for indecent assault against a girl aged 14 in 2003. Hussain was charged in 2018 alongside several other men who were all later found not guilty. Hussain fled to Bulgaria before the trial; he was later arrested and extradited back to the UK for trial.

In July 2025, Kessur Ajaib, Sageer Hussain, and Mohammed Makhmood were found guilty of repeatedly raping and indecently assaulting two teenage girls in Rotherham between 1999 and 2002. One of the men, Sageer Hussain, was already serving a 19-year prison sentence at the time of the trial after being convicted in 2016 of raping a 13-year-old girl.

== Reports and inquiries ==
=== Weir report (2001) ===
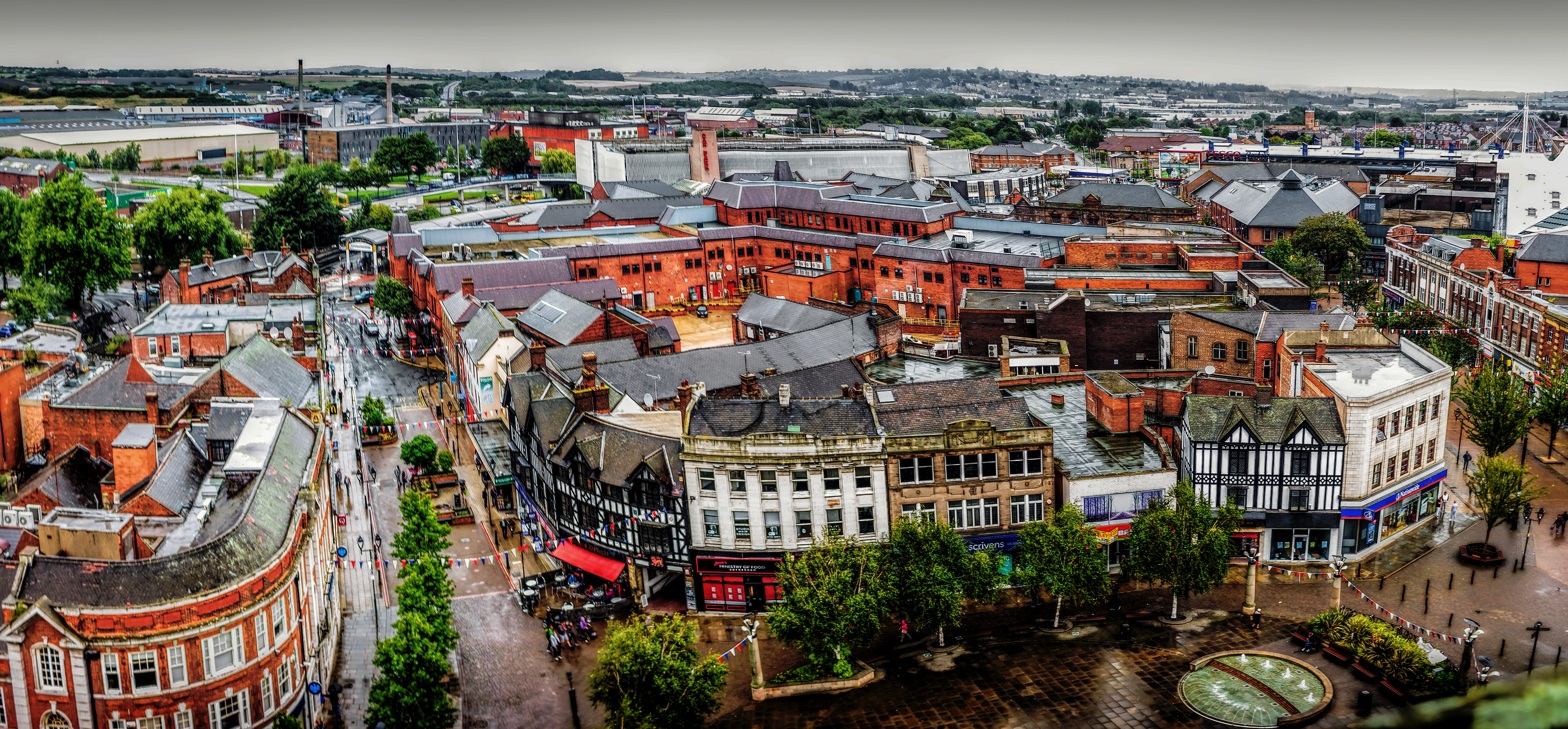
Rotherham town centre, September 2016

In 2000, solicitor Adele Weir (later Gladman) was hired by Rotherham Council as a research and development officer on a Home Office Crime Reduction Programme pilot study, including a section on "young people and prostitution" in Rotherham. Weir said she encountered "poor professional practice from an early stage" from the council and police, and that child protection issues were "disregarded, dismissed or minimized". In her 10-page mapping exercise in 2001, Weir said she showed "a small number of suspected abusers who were well known to all significant services in Rotherham". Weir estimated at that point that there were 270 victims. Weir's report for the Home Office linked 54 abused children to the Hussain family, as of October 2001. Weir said that South Yorkshire Police told her the report was "unhelpful". In October 2001, Weir told the Chief Constable of South Yorkshire Police and the District Commander that local agencies had "ceased passing on information" as they thought it was a "waste of time" due to the police response being "often so inappropriate". The letter was not well received by the council or police. Weir sent her data to the Home Office evaluators in Bedfordshire in April 2002. Weir was told that social services, the police and education staff had met and decided that she and her colleagues were "exceeding [their] roles". In June 2002, she was asked to amend her report to "anonymise individuals and institutions" and to only include those facts she was "able to substantiate".

=== Heal reports (2002–2006) ===
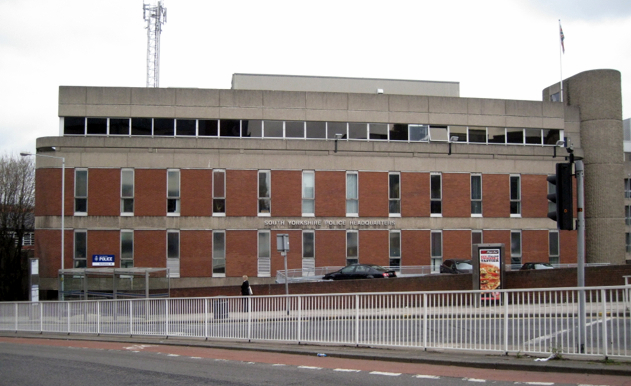
South Yorkshire Police headquarters, Snig Hill, Sheffield

In 2002–2007 South Yorkshire Police hired Angie Heal, a strategic drugs analyst, to carry out research on drug use and supply in the area. While researching the local supply of crack cocaine, Heal learned that drugs were given to children as part of the grooming process. Heal's first report in 2002 recommended dealing with the child-abuse rings, prosecuting them for drugs offences if they could not be convicted of sex offences. Heal said that her report was widely read, but there was a "complete lack of interest" in the links between the local drug trade and child abuse. Heal's second report, in 2003 said that Rotherham had a "significant number of girls and some boys who are being sexually exploited". Heal shared the names of the perpetrators with the police. Heal's third report in 2006 said that the continuing situation involved "systematic physical and sexual violence against young women", including trafficking to other towns. The report recommended: "More emphasis should be placed on tackling the abusers, rather than the abused." Heal sent her 2006 report to the Rotherham Drugs Partnership, the district commander, and the chief superintendents. Heal left the South Yorkshire Police in March 2007. In 2015, her 2003 and 2006 reports were released by South Yorkshire Police following a Freedom of Information Act request.

=== The Times investigation ===
From 2003, Andrew Norfolk of The Times wrote a number of articles about group-based child sexual exploitation of girls by British-Pakistani men, especially in northern England and the Midlands. In 2012, Rotherham Council applied to the High Court of Justice for an injunction to stop Norfolk publishing an unredacted version of a serious case review written after the murder of 17-year-old Laura Wilson. Wilson and her sister had been the target of localised grooming from age 11.

=== Home Affairs Committee (2013–2014) ===
In June 2012, as a result of the 2010 Rotherham convictions, the House of Commons Home Affairs Select Committee began hearing evidence about localised grooming. The committee published its report, Child sexual exploitation and the response to localised grooming, in June 2013, with a follow-up in October 2014 in response to the Jay Report. The follow-up report called for new legislation to allow the removal of elected Police and Crime Commissioners following a vote of no confidence.

=== Jay inquiry (2014) ===
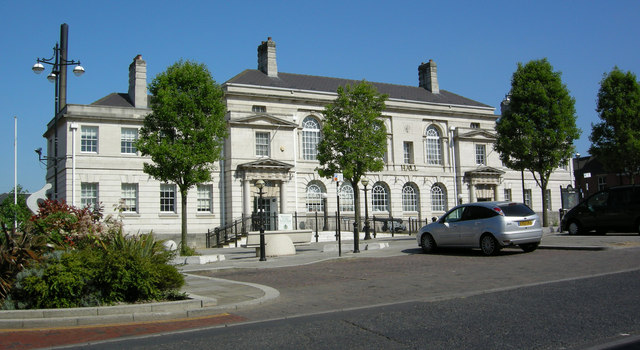
Rotherham Town Hall

In October 2013, Rotherham Council commissioned Alexis Jay, a former chief social work adviser to the Scottish government, to conduct an independent inquiry into its handling of child-sexual-exploitation reports since 1997. Published on 26 August 2014, the report said at least 1,400 children as young as 11 had experienced extreme threats, violence, rape and trafficking. According to the report, the police had shown a lack of respect for the victims in the early 2000s, deeming them "undesirables" unworthy of police protection. Staff were sidelined and their concerns were met with "indifference and scorn". Some council staff were also told not to mention the ethnic origins of perpetrators.

Following the Jay Report, the Labour leader of Rotherham Council and its chief executive both resigned. The council's director of children's services, and the Police and Crime Commissioner (PCC) for South Yorkshire Police from 2012 stepped down in September 2014, under pressure. Several others also resigned. David Crompton, Chief Constable of South Yorkshire Police from 2012 to 2016, invited the National Crime Agency to conduct an independent inquiry.

=== Casey inquiry (2015) ===
Following the Jay Report, the Secretary of State for Communities and Local Government, Eric Pickles, commissioned an independent inspection of Rotherham Council. Led by Louise Casey, director-general of the government's Troubled Families programme, the inspection examined the council's governance, services for children and young people, and taxi and private-hire licensing. Published in February 2015, the Casey Report concluded that Rotherham Council was "not fit for purpose". Casey identified a culture of "bullying, sexism ... and misplaced 'political correctness'", along with a history of covering up information and silencing whistleblowers. The child sexual exploitation team was poorly directed, had excessive case loads, and did not share information. The council had a history of failing to deal with issues around race: Pakistani-heritage councillors were left to deal with all issues pertaining to that community, which left them able to exert disproportionate influence, while white councillors ignored their responsibilities. In February 2015, the government replaced its elected officers with a team of five commissioners, including one tasked specifically with looking at children's services. Files relating to one current and one former councillor identifying "a number of potentially criminal matters" were passed to the National Crime Agency. The leader of the council resigned, and members of the council cabinet also stood down.

=== Independent Police Complaints Commission investigation (2020) ===
The Independent Police Complaints Commission (IPCC) began an investigation into allegations of police wrongdoing following the Jay Report. It was the second-largest inquiry the IPCC had undertaken after the inquiry into the 1989 Hillsborough football disaster in Sheffield. As of March 2017, nine inquiries were complete, with no case to answer regarding officer conduct, but recommendations were made to the force about the recording of information. Another 53 investigations were underway.

A five-year investigation by the Independent Office for Police Conduct (IOPC) said that the Rotherham police ignored the sexual abuse of children for decades for fear of increasing racial tensions. The IOPC upheld a complaint from the father of one of the victims that police took "insufficient action". The complainant says he was told by a police officer the town "would erupt" if it became known that South Asian men were sexually abusing underage girls.

=== Home Office Report (2020) ===
The Rotherham case was among several cases which prompted investigations into the claim that the majority of perpetrators from grooming gangs were British Pakistani. The first, by Quilliam, was published in December 2017, and claimed 84% of offenders were of South Asian heritage. This report was criticised by child sexual exploitation experts Ella Cockbain and Waqas Tufail in a paper in January 2020. A further investigation was carried out by the British government in December 2020. The Home Office investigation suggested the majority of child sexual exploitation gangs were, in fact, composed of white men and not British Pakistani men.

"Beyond specific high-profile cases, the academic literature highlights significant limitations to what can be said about links between ethnicity and this form of offending. Research has found that group-based CSE offenders are most commonly White. Some studies suggest an over-representation of Black and Asian offenders relative to the demographics of national populations. However, it is not possible to conclude that this is representative of all group-based CSE offending. This is due to issues such as data quality problems, the way the samples were selected in studies, and the potential for bias and inaccuracies in the way that ethnicity data is collected"; the report also added "Based on the existing evidence, and our understanding of the flaws in the existing data, it seems most likely that the ethnicity of group-based CSE offenders is in line with CSA [child sexual abuse] more generally and with the general population, with the majority of offenders being White".

Child sexual exploitation experts Cockbain and Tufail said of the report: "The two-year study by the Home Office makes very clear that there are no grounds for asserting that Muslim or Pakistani-heritage men are disproportionately engaged in such crimes, and, citing our research, it confirmed the unreliability of the Quilliam claim." A 2020 report by CEOP indicated that in the records of defendants prosecuted for child sexual abuse offences, Asians were actually underrepresented among the child sexual abuse offenders in the country.

The 2025 Baroness Casey's report noted that the data of the 2020 Home Office report "does not include sufficient ethnicity data to conclude that the majority of offenders are White", which made it "hard to understand how the Home Office reached the conclusion in their paper that the ethnicity of group-based child sexual exploitation offenders is likely to be in line with child sexual abuse more generally and with the general population i.e. “with the majority of offenders being White.""

=== Baroness Casey's National Audit 2025 ===
In 2025, Baroness Casey published findings that despite flaws in data collection, there was enough local data from three police forces – Greater Manchester, South Yorkshire and West Yorkshire – that showed that disproportionate numbers of Asian men were involved in child sex grooming gangs. On the specific case of Operation Stovewood in Rotherham, the report noted that of the 323 child sex abuse suspects and the 42 individuals convicted, nearly two-thirds were of Pakistani ethnic background. Nationally, in two-thirds of cases the ethnicity of the perpetrators was not recorded, which made it impossible to draw conclusions at a national level, or to assess the scale of the issue. The report found that the ethnicity of the perpetrators had been "shied away from"; and "obfuscation" when examining the ethnicity of offenders. The report said that the claims that there is overwhelming problem with White perpetrators "can't be proved", and that "flawed data is used repeatedly to dismiss claims about 'Asian grooming gangs' as sensationalised, biased or untrue".

=== Independent Inquiry into Grooming Gangs (2026) ===
Baroness Casey called for a national inquiry having previously rejected the idea. She had changed her mind due to the failure of many local councils to set up their own inquiries and the reluctance of some organisations to talk to her own investigators. The Prime Minister Keir Starmer, announced two days before the report was published that there would be a full national statutory inquiry into grooming gangs. Under the Inquiries Act 2005, the minister who sets up an inquiry must appoint a chairman and set terms of reference by an instrument in writing. On 9 December 2025, Home Secretary Shabana Mahmood made a statement to Parliament announcing the Independent Inquiry into Grooming Gangs, its panel with Baroness Anne Longfield as its chair, and draft terms of reference to be confirmed no later than March 2026.

== Ethnic, religious, and cultural factors ==
The Jay Report estimated there were at least 1,400 victims in Rotherham. While it did not specify the ethnicity of the victims or the perpetrators, it said: "In a large number of the historic cases in particular, most of the victims in the cases we sampled were white British children, and the majority of the perpetrators were from minority ethnic communities." Operation Stovewood reported that most victims were white girls and about 80 % of perpetrators were males of Pakistani heritage. The Jay Report also described other, less investigated cases in which Asian women and girls were the primary victims, despite the belief that the victims were only white. Social isolation and fear of dishonour prevented Asian victims from coming forward. The report further said that "there is no simple link between race and child sexual exploitation, and across the UK the greatest numbers of perpetrators of CSE are white men". The ethnicity of offenders has also increased community tensions and led to far-right marches and violence in the town. An 81-year-old man was murdered by two white men who called him a "groomer" as they attacked him.

=== Underreporting due to ethnicity, religion, or culture ===
According to the Muslim Women's Network UK, Asian victims may be particularly vulnerable to threats of bringing shame and dishonour to their families, and may have believed that reporting the abuse would be an admission they had violated their cultural beliefs. One of the local Pakistani women's groups had described Pakistani girls being targeted by Pakistani taxi drivers and landlords, but they feared reporting to the police out of concerns for their marriage prospects. The report suggested "the underreporting of exploitation and abuse in minority ethnic communities" should be addressed.

In response to claims that social services had failed to act through political correctness, the Jay Report "found no evidence of children's social care staff being influenced by concerns about the ethnic origins of suspected perpetrators when dealing with individual child protection cases, including CSE". In 2021, an investigation by the Times suggested South Yorkshire Police was not routinely recording the ethnicity of child sexual abuse suspects. In Rotherham, police omitted suspect ethnicity in 67 % of cases. The force said it had increased reporting of ethnicity since 2019.

== See also ==
- Child sexual abuse in the United Kingdom
- Independent Inquiry into Child Sexual Abuse
- Aylesbury child sex abuse ring
- Banbury child sex abuse ring
- Bristol child sex abuse ring
- Derby child sex abuse ring
- Halifax child sex abuse ring
- Huddersfield grooming gang
- Keighley child sex abuse ring
- Manchester child sex abuse ring
- Newcastle sex abuse ring
- North Wales child abuse scandal
- Oulu child sexual exploitation scandal
- Oxford child sex abuse ring
- Peterborough sex abuse case
- Rochdale child sex abuse ring
- Telford child sexual exploitation scandal
- List of sexual abuses perpetrated by groups

== Works cited ==
The article cites the following books and reports. All other sources are listed in the References section only.

- Boyd, Iain (July 2015). "Being Heard: A Thematic Analysis of the Newspaper Media Response to the Jay Report and the Rotherham Child Abuse Scandal" (PDF). University of Hertfordshire. Archived from the original (PDF) on 11 August 2017.
- Cantrill, Pat (April 2011). Serious Case Review Overview Report. In respect of: Child S (PDF). Rotherham: Rotherham Borough Council. Archived from the original (PDF) on 11 August 2017.
- Casey, Louise (4 February 2015). Report of Inspection of Rotherham Metropolitan Borough Council (PDF). London: Department for Communities and Local Government. ISBN 978-1-4741-1507-0.
- Drew, John (23 March 2016). An independent review of South Yorkshire Police's handling of child sexual exploitation 1997–2016 (PDF). drewreview.uk.
- Gladman, Adele; Heal, Angie (2017). Child Sexual Exploitation After Rotherham. London: Jessica Kingsley Publisher. ISBN 978-1-7845-0276-8.
- Heal, Angie (August 2003). Sexual Exploitation, Drug Use and Drug Dealing: The Current Situation in South Yorkshire (PDF). London: Local Government Chronicle.
- Heal, Angie (March 2006). A Problem Profile—Violence and Gun Crime: Links with Sexual Exploitation, Prostitution and Drug Markets in South Yorkshire (PDF). London: Local Government Chronicle.
- Heal, Angie (9 September 2014). "Supplementary written evidence submitted by Dr Angie Heal" (PDF). London: House of Commons Home Affairs Committee.
- Hester, Marianne; Westmarland, Nicole (2004). Tackling Street Prostitution: Towards an holistic approach (PDF). London: Home Office Research, Development and Statistics Directorate. ISBN 1844733068. Archived from the original (PDF) on 22 April 2017.
- Hollington, Kris (2013). Unthinkable: The Shocking Scandal of the UK Sex Traffickers. London: Simon & Schuster. ISBN 978-1-47111-455-7.
- Home Affairs Committee (a) (10 June 2013). Child sexual exploitation and the response to localised grooming. Second Report of Session 2013–14, Vol. 1 (PDF). London: House of Commons, The Stationery Office Limited.
- Home Affairs Committee (b) (12 June 2013). Child sexual exploitation and the response to localised grooming. Second Report of Session 2013–14, Vol. 2 (PDF). London: House of Commons, The Stationery Office Limited.
- Home Affairs Committee (c) (15 October 2014). Child sexual exploitation and the response to localised grooming: follow-up. Sixth Report of Session 2014–15 (PDF). London: House of Commons, The Stationery Office Limited.
- Jay, Alexis (21 August 2014). Independent Inquiry into Child Sexual Exploitation in Rotherham (1997–2013). Rotherham: Rotherham Metropolitan Borough Council.
- Senior, Jayne (2016). Broken and Betrayed: The true story of the Rotherham abuse scandal by the woman who fought to expose it. London: Pan Macmillan. ISBN 9781509801619.
- Weir, Adele (23 October 2001). "Letter" (PDF). London: House of Commons, The Stationery Office Ltd.
- Weir, Adele (2002). "Chapter Four: Key Achievements of the Home Office Pilot" (PDF). Home Affairs Committee. (This draft document shows the anonymised evaluation results of Adele Weir's 2000–2002 Home Office pilot study in Rotherham. Risky Business is referred to as the "Project". The reports about other towns in the pilot study were published, but the Rotherham chapter was not. It was first published in 2014 as part of the Jay report and again by the Home Affairs Committee.)
- Weir, Adele (15 October 2014). "Summary of evidence to Home Affairs Committee". London: House of Commons, The Stationery Office Ltd.
- Wilson, Sarah; McKelvie, Geraldine (2015). Violated: A Shocking and Harrowing Survival Story from the Notorious Rotherham Abuse Scandal. London: Harper Element. ISBN 978-00081-4126-4.
