= Fiona Goddard =

British campaigner and survivor of child sexual exploitation

Fiona Goddard is a British campaigner and survivor of child sexual exploitation in Bradford, England. Nine men were convicted in 2019 of sexual offense against her and another girl. After waiving her anonymity she became a prominent voice on grooming gangs. In October 2025 she resigned from the survivors and victims liaisons panel of the National Inquiry into Grooming Gangs, which led to a public dispute with the safeguard ministers Jess Philips.

== Abuse and convictions ==
Goddard was 14 and living in a children's home in Bradford when she was groomed and abused from 2008. A safeguarding review found that her mother had raised concern about child sexual exploitation in 2008, and that evidence of her contact with adult men "was not acted upon by the police of children' social care". It also found that her frequent absences were graded as "unauthorized" absences rather than missing, which led to the downgraded police response.

In February 2019 nine men were sentenced at Bradford Crown Court for the sexual abuse of two girls who had been placed in the same children's home, receiving sentences totaling 132 years. The ringleader, Basharat Khaliq, received 20 years.

== Grooming gang inquiry ==
After the UK government announced a national inquiry into grooming gangs in June 2025, Goddard was appointed to its victims and survivors liaison panel. On 20 October 2025, she resigned citing, "secretive conduct" and "condescending and controlling language" towards survivors. She also objected to the shortlisting of candidates to chair the inquiry with backgrounds in policing and social work and to what she describes as attempts to widen the remit beyond grooming gangs. Ellie-Ann Reynolds resigned the same day, and further members of the panel left the in the following days.

Philips told to the House of Commons that suggestions the inquiry's scope would be widened or diluted were "false" and "categorically untrue", and that the inquiry would remain "laser focused" on grooming. Goddard disputed this and published text messages with Philips, which were shown to the BBC and the "New statesman". Her solicitors, Switalskis, wrote to Philips alleging that her statement was defamatory and seeking a written apology. Other survivors on the panel took a different view and said they wished Philips to remain in post. Anne Longfield Baroness was announced as the inquiry's chair in December 2025.

== Compensation claim ==
Goddard brought a legal claim against West Yorkshire Police and Bradford Metropolitan District. Both denied liability. In a letter to her solicitor, West Yorkshire Police said the claims in negligence, misfeasance and conspiracy to injury were "entity without merit". Goddard told the BBC the responses amounted to "another level of dismissal" and that the authorities were acknowledging failures publicly while contesting liability in private.

== Writing ==
Goddard has written for The Spectator, including an account of her resignation from the inquiry panel.

== See also ==
- Grooming gang scandal
- Rotherham child sexual exploitation scandal
- Independent Inquiry into Child Sexual Abuse
- Sammy Woodhouse
- Maggie Oliver
