= Child Protection Authority =

Proposed government agency of the United Kingdom

The Child Protection Authority is a proposed government agency of the United Kingdom.

The creation of a Child Protection Authority was one of the recommendations of the report of the Independent Inquiry into Child Sexual Abuse (IICSA), published in 2022.

A proposal that the creation of the agency be made a statutory requirement as part of the Children's Wellbeing and Schools Bill was voted down in a vote in the House of Commons in February 2025.

In April 2025, Jess Philips, the Parliamentary Under-Secretary of State for Safeguarding and Violence Against Women and Girls, announced that work would start on creating the agency. Opposition politicians criticised the government for not having acted on the IICSA's recommendations sooner.

As part of the recommendations made by Louise Casey in the report of the National Audit on Group-based Child Sexual Exploitation and Abuse, published in June 2025, the Child Protection Agency is planned to be one of the organizations responsible for ensuring inter-agency collaboration against child abuse. The government has stated that it intends to implement all of the recommendations of the audit report.

== See also ==
- Grooming gangs scandal
- Independent Safeguarding Authority
