= Huddersfield sex abuse ring =

Group of sex offenders in Huddersfield, West Yorkshire, England

The Huddersfield child sex abuse ring were a group of men who were convicted of sexual offences against girls in Huddersfield, West Yorkshire, United Kingdom. It is the largest gang ever convicted for sexual abuse in the United Kingdom. The offences took place between 2004 and 2011, and the men were charged following the Operation Tendersea inquiry by the police. The trials began in April 2017 and 20 men were convicted in 2018 in three separate trials. Since then, further men have been convicted in a series of trials, bringing the total number of perpetrators convicted to 42 by April 2023.

A report released in June 2019 indicated that 15 of the 22 females involved were known to children's services. Although there was "sufficient evidence" that two girls were being sexually exploited, one as early as 2007, no action was taken by the Kirklees Children's Services.

Due to the majority of the named offenders being of Pakistani origin (though the ringleader of the gang was a Sikh), the case has been cited as an example of an "Asian grooming gang" and became a subject of political controversy.

== Trials ==
Twenty-seven men were accused of sexual offences including rape and trafficking against eighteen girls aged between 11 and 17, with two further women accused of child neglect. Due to the large number of defendants, the court proceedings against them were conducted in three separate trials. Reporting restrictions on the trial were imposed in November 2017 under the 1981 Contempt of Court Act to avoid prejudice on subsequent trials.

However, the reporting restrictions were criticised by far-right groups, saying that it was a cover-up as the defendants were Asian and Muslims, and that it amounted to "state censorship". Far-right activist Tommy Robinson live-streamed video from outside the court on Facebook during the second of the trials, filmed some of the accused and talked about Muslims and "jihad rape gangs", which led to his arrest and prosecution for contempt of court.

Twenty men were convicted in October 2018 of 120 offenses of rape and abuse against fifteen girls, and sentenced to a total of 221 years. Reporting restrictions on the trials were partially lifted in October 2018. Sixteen of the gang were sentenced in October 2018, the remaining four were sentenced in November 2018. One of the convicted gang members, Faisal Nadeem, appealed against the sentence arguing that Robinson's live video had prejudiced the trial, but his permission to appeal was refused by a Court of Appeal judge.

Six separate trials had been held by February 2020, with 34 men convicted in total. Another man was convicted in April 2020.

== Perpetrators ==
A total of 29 people were arrested and charged by March 2017 under Operation Tendersea. Members of the gang were "all British Asians mainly of Pakistani heritage" and were from the areas of Huddersfield, Sheffield, Bradford and Dewsbury. The ringleader of the gang, however, was Amere Singh Dhaliwal, a Sikh man. He is a married father of two children and known by the nickname "Prestos".

In total 15 girls were abused. The first allegations to be taken seriously were made in 2011 when a victim wrote a letter to a judge about the abuse although no formal complaint was lodged at the time. A formal complaint was made in 2013 by another victim. Twenty of the accused were first convicted on 19 October 2018 of 120 offences against the 15 girls. One of the gang members, Sajid Hussain, fled during the trial and was sentenced in his absence. Two more men were sentenced in June 2019. Mohammed Akram was previously convicted and had his sentence increased whilst Usman Khalid was sentenced to five years. A further five men were jailed in November 2019. Three of the men were not named for legal reasons whilst Umar Zaman fled to Pakistan and was sentenced in his absence. Zaman was later arrested and jailed when he tried to return to the UK in 2022. Seven more men were convicted in February 2020. A man was convicted in April 2020 along with another previously unnamed man, Shaqeel Hussain, who was sentenced to a further 12 months. Three men were sentenced in July 2021 for rape and grooming offences dating back to the 1990's. Three more men were sentenced in August 2021 whilst another man was further sentenced.

List of convicted perpetrators
Name	Age	Sentence	Ref.
Irfan Ahmed	34	8 years	
Mohammed Rizwan Aslam	31	15 years	
Amere Singh Dhaliwal	35	Life with a minimum term of 18 years	
Raj Singh Barsran	34	17 years	
Mansoor Akhtar	27	8 years	
Sajid Hussain	33	17 years	
Mohammed Irfraz	30	6 years	
Faisal Nadeem	32	12 years	
Mohammed Azeem	33	18 years	
Niaz Ahmed	54	5 years	
Zahid Hassan	29	21 years (increased from 18 years)	
Nasarat Hussain	30	19 years (increased from 17 years)	
Asif Bashir	33	15 years (increased from 11 years)	
Manzoor Hassan	38	14 years (increased from 5 years)	
Abdul Rehman	31	16 year, 3 years 11 months	
Mohammed Kammer	34	16 year, 7 years 6 months	
Nahman Mohammed	32	15 years, 7 years	
Wiqas Mahmud	38	15 years, 6 years 3 months	
Mohammed Imran Ibrar	34	5 years (increased from 3 years)	
Mohammed Akram	33	22 years (increased from 17 years)	
Usman Khalid	31	5 years	
Umar Zaman	31	8 years 8 months (increased from 8 years)	
Samuel Fikru	32	8 years	
Banaris Hussain	36	10 years	
Banaras Hussain	39	9 years 6 months	
Usman Ali	34	8 years	
Abdul Majid	35	11 years	
Gul Riaz	43	15 years	
Manzoor Akhtar	31	4 years 6 months	
Shaqeel Hussain	36	9 years (increased from 8 years)	
Talish Ahmed	41	10 years	
Mohammed Akram	44	13 years	
Banaras Hussain	44	18 years	
Saqib Raheel	34	10 years 6 months	
Sholan James	30	6 years	
Rashid Iqbal	46	12 years	
Unnamed Man	32	14 years	
Unnamed Man	32	8 years	
Unnamed Man	38	7 years	
Unnamed Man	37	8 years	
Unnamed Man	30	4 years	

== Political reactions ==
After the reporting restrictions on the Huddersfield trial were lifted, the Conservative Home Secretary Sajid Javid sent out a tweet stating: "These sick Asian paedophiles are finally facing justice. I want to commend the bravery of the victims. For too long, they were ignored. Not on my watch. There will be no no-go areas." His referencing of the ethnic heritage of the offenders was strongly condemned by senior Labour politicians Diane Abbott, Sadiq Khan and David Lammy, who alleged that he was seeking "to pin the blame on [...] one group" and pandering to the far-right. In a later interview with Sky News, Javid accused his critics of being "oversensitive" and refused to apologise or withdraw his comment, saying: "When I made that comment I was stating the facts, and the sad truth is that if you look at recent high-profile convictions of gang-based child sexual exploitation there is a majority of people that come from Pakistani heritage backgrounds—that's plain for everyone to see."

In 2025, the national audit by Baroness Casey said there was enough local data from three police forces – Greater Manchester, South Yorkshire and West Yorkshire – to show that disproportionate numbers of Asian men were involved in child sex grooming gangs in those areas. In West Yorkshire, police data from the 2020–2024 period showed that 35% of 1,173 suspects were self-reported to be Asian and 34% white (no ethnicity was recorded for 24%), in contrast to the ethnicity profile for West Yorkshire which is 16% Asian and 77% White. The report said that the ethnicity of perpetrators had been "shied away from". Nationally, the ethnicity of the perpetrators was not recorded in two-thirds of cases, which made it impossible to draw conclusions at a national level or to assess the scale of the issue. Casey also called for a national inquiry, which was endorsed by the Prime Minister Keir Starmer, who announced two days before the report was published that there would be a full national statutory inquiry into grooming gangs.

== See also ==
- Child sexual abuse in the United Kingdom
- List of sexual abuses perpetrated by groups
