= Ivison Trust =

Charitable organisation in England and Wales

The Ivison Trust, formerly known as Parents Against Child Exploitation (Pace), is a charitable organisation in England and Wales that works with parents of children who have been, or are at risk of being, sexually or criminally exploited. The charity was founded in 1996 as the Coalition for the Removal of Pimping (CROP) by Irene Ivison and other affected parents following the murder of Ivison's 17-year-old daughter Fiona in Doncaster.

== History ==
Ivison Trust was formed as Pace (Parents Against Child Exploitation) in 1996 by Irene Ivison, whose daughter Fiona had been groomed by a known pimp, forced into prostitution, and killed at the age of 17, just three weeks after being forced onto the street and sold for sex by her boyfriend / pimp. Fiona's killer was successfully prosecuted and received a life sentence.

The charity received funding for its first parent support worker in 2002 and grew to a staff of 20 by 2021. In 2025, Pace renamed itself the Ivison Trust.

=== Founder ===
Irene Ivison was born in Oxford on 5 March 1946 and died after complications from a routine operation on 20 October 2000.

From her daughter's murder in 1993 until her own death in 2000, Ivison campaigned along with other parents to bring the issue of pimping to wider attention. Ivison published a book about her daughter in 1997 called Fiona's Story, recounting how she read of her daughter's death in the newspaper.

For her work, Ivison was nominated for the Emma Humphreys Memorial Prize just three days prior to her death.

== Services and campaigns ==
Ivison Trust provides parent support workers to parents with children who are, or are vulnerable to, child sexual and criminal exploitation by perpetrators external to the family. Ivison Trust also provides training to other professionals on how child exploitation affects the whole family and works as an advocate on behalf of parents to influence policy and raise awareness.

Ivison Trust has produced several publications and research papers over the years and has worked closely with the BBC on the production of special reports relating to child sexual exploitation, including a BBC Panorama episode called "Teenage Sex for Sale".

== Impact ==
From its early days, Ivison Trust has influenced policy. Irene Ivison was consulted and helped draft the National Plan to Prevent Sexual Exploitation of Children and the Sexual Offences Review. Irene Ivison also took up a legal challenge over what she argued was a failure on the part of police and social services to protect Fiona, which went to the European Court of Human Rights and was taken up by her other daughter, Rebecca, after her death. The case, Ivison v. UK, was ultimately ruled as inadmissible with the Court concluding that, "there has been no failure by the authorities in this case to respect the family and private life of Fiona and her mother."

Ivison Trust has been active in providing input to consultations led by the Department for Education and the Home Office and has affected the way in which guidance references support for families. Hilary Willmer, an Ivison Trust founding member and current trustee, said in respect to a 2012 DfE report: "CROP particularly welcomes the recognition that whole families suffer the devastating consequences of child sexual exploitation and need support. CROP hopes that there will also be recognition of the significant positive potential of many parents to be included as active partners in the safeguarding of children."

== Funders ==
Ivison Trust relies on several trusts and foundations, government funding, private donors and fundraising through training events and publication sales.

Charitable trusts, foundations and government funding has been received by Ivison Trust from: Comic Relief, Dulverton Trust, Eleanor Rathbone Charitable Trust, Esmée Fairbairn Foundation, Garfield Weston Foundation, Henry Smith Charity, John Ellerman Foundation, Leeds Community Foundation (The Funding Network), Lankelly Chase, Lloyds TSB Foundation, Peter De Haan Charitable Trust, Sir Halley Stewart Trust, Tudor Trust, National Lottery, BIG Lottery Fund, Department of Health, Department for Education.
