= Andrew Norfolk =

British investigative journalist (1965–2025)

- Born: Andrew Mark Norfolk; 8 January 1965; Canterbury, Kent, England
- Died: 8 May 2025 (aged 60)
- Education: Kent College; Ashville College
- Alma mater: Durham University
- Occupation: Newspaper journalist
- Employer: The Times
- Known for: Reporting on the Rotherham child sexual exploitation scandal

Andrew Mark Norfolk (8 January 1965 – 8 May 2025) was a British journalist and chief investigative reporter for The Times. Norfolk became known in 2011 for his reporting on the Rotherham child sexual exploitation scandal and other cases of on-street child grooming. He won both the Paul Foot Award and Orwell Prize for his work, and was named 2014 Journalist of the Year.

== Early life and education ==
Norfolk was born on 8 January 1965 in Canterbury, Kent to David Norfolk, a headmaster and Methodist lay preacher, and Olive (née Bellerby).

After attending Kent College, and Ashville College, Harrogate, both independent schools, Norfolk studied English at Durham University, where he was sports editor of Palatinate, the university newspaper. He also represented the university at field hockey and was a substitute in the 1985 University Athletic Union final against Exeter University. A member of Hild Bede College, Norfolk graduated in 1987.

== Career ==
After graduating, Norfolk worked as a reporter with the Scarborough Evening News in 1989, where he was a representative for the National Union of Journalists. He became a reporter for the Yorkshire Post in 1995, a reporter for The Times in 2000, north-east correspondent for The Times in 2002, and the newspaper's chief investigative reporter in 2012.

In 2010, Norfolk began investigating the on-street grooming of girls in the Midlands and northern England, largely by British-Pakistani men, and from January 2011 he produced a series of reports that triggered several formal inquiries. He had known about the grooming earlier because Ann Cryer, the MP for Keighley, had publicly raised concerns about the abuse of two girls.

As a result of this work, he won the Paul Foot Award for investigative journalism in February 2013; the judges said his stories had "prompted two government-ordered inquiries, a parliamentary inquiry and a new national action plan on child sexual exploitation". In May that year, he shared the Orwell Prize with Tom Bergin of Reuters, and in December 2014 he was named Journalist of the Year by the British Journalism Awards.

In August 2017, The Times published an article by Norfolk headlined "Christian child forced into Muslim foster care" about a foster placement in the London Borough of Tower Hamlets. The borough council complained to the Independent Press Standards Organisation (IPSO), which ruled that the story was riddled with inaccuracies. IPSO required The Times to run the ruling in the front page of its print edition and in its online edition. Norfolk afterwards said that with hindsight, he would not write the story again.

In November 2024, Norfolk retired after a 24-year career at The Times.

In January 2025, following further news coverage of the child sexual exploitation scandal, Norfolk said publicly that the root causes of grooming gangs had still not been properly examined and criticised how the issue had been hijacked by the far-right.

=== Appraisal ===
Upon announcement of his death on 15 May 2025, Keir Starmer, UK Prime Minister, led tributes to Norfolk saying: “I am deeply sorry to hear of Andrew’s death. He wasn’t just an incredibly talented reporter, at The Times and elsewhere, he was driven by the desire to call our attention to injustice and protect the most vulnerable." A number of high-profile journalists and politicians reacted to Norfolk's death, including Tony Gallagher, the editor of The Times, who said: “Andrew was, without doubt, one of the greatest investigative reporters of our or any age. His tireless work exposing the evils of the predominantly Asian grooming gangs in and around towns in the north of England led to long overdue acknowledgement of the crimes, after the people who had been in a position to put a stop to it for years chose to look the other way."

== Death ==
Norfolk died on 8 May 2025, after collapsing during a routine medical appointment. He was 60. He had experienced a period of ill health, including feeling exhausted.
