= Newcastle sex abuse ring =

Criminal gang in Newcastle, England

The Newcastle sex abuse ring were a gang of seventeen men and a woman who sexually abused adolescent girls and young women from 2010 to 2014 in Newcastle upon Tyne, England, after plying them with alcohol and drugs. The men included those of Albanian, Kurdish, Bangladeshi, Indian, Turkish, Iranian, Iraqi, Eastern European and Pakistani heritage who were aged between 27 and 44. The victims ranged in age from 13 to 25.

== Crimes ==
As in the Oxford, Rochdale and Rotherham prosecutions, the men pretended friendship and offered alcohol and drugs, winning the trust of their victims before initiating abusive sexual relationships. Victims told court that in some cases they were rendered unconscious by drugs and woke to find themselves undressed, having been subject to sexual assaults. The prosecution successfully argued that the victims, whose ages ranged from 13 to 25, were chosen because they were vulnerable and seemed less likely both to complain to the authorities and to be believed if they did so complain.

Operation Shelter, the specific police operation in Newcastle which led to the four trials, identified up to 108 potential victims, while the wider Operation Sanctuary, targeting abuse in the entire Northumbria police district, has identified up to 278 victims.

== Reactions ==
The British Labour politician Sarah Champion claimed regarding media news about this and previous trials, that there is a need to "acknowledge" that in all of the towns where similar cases have occurred "the majority of the perpetrators have been British Pakistani". She said: "We have got now, hundreds of Pakistani men who have been convicted of this crime, why are we not commissioning research to see what is going on and how we need to change what is going on. ... I genuinely think that it’s because more people are afraid to be called a racist than they are afraid to be wrong about calling out child abuse."

=== Investigations ===
The Newcastle case was one of several cases which prompted investigations looking into the claim that the majority of perpetrators from grooming gangs were British Pakistani; the first was by Quilliam in December 2017, which released a report entitled "Group Based Child Sexual Exploitation – Dissecting Grooming Gangs", which claimed 84% of offenders were of South Asian heritage. However this report was "fiercely" criticised for its unscientific nature and poor methodology by child sexual exploitation experts Ella Cockbain and Waqas Tufail, in their paper "Failing Victims, Fuelling Hate: Challenging the Harms of the 'Muslim grooming gangs' Narrative" which was published in January 2020.

A further investigation was carried out by the British government in December 2020, when the Home Office published their findings, showing that the majority of child sexual exploitation gangs were, in fact, composed of white men and not British Pakistani men.

Research has found that group-based child sexual exploitation offenders are most commonly white. Some studies suggest an overrepresentation of black and Asian offenders relative to the demographics of national populations. However, it is not possible to conclude that this is representative of all group-based CSE offending.

– Home Office.

In 2025, the national audit by Baroness Casey noted that the data of the 2020 Home Office report "does not include sufficient ethnicity data to conclude that the majority of offenders are White", which made the claim made in the 2020 report "hard to understand". The report found there was enough local data from three police forces – Greater Manchester, South Yorkshire and West Yorkshire – to show that disproportionate numbers of Asian men were involved in child sex grooming gangs. The report said that the ethnicity of perpetrators had been "shied away from". However, nationally in two-thirds of cases the ethnicity of the perpetrators was not recorded, which made it impossible to draw conclusions at a national level, or to assess the scale of the issue.

Casey called for a national inquiry, which was endorsed by the Prime Minister Keir Starmer, who announced two days before the report was published that there would be a full national statutory inquiry into grooming gangs.

== Operation Sanctuary ==
A Northumbria Police probe into the abuse of one single girl uncovered serial abuse of teenage girls in Tyneside and resulted in the launch of "Operation Sanctuary," under which the initial arrests took place in January 2014 and had reached 67 arrests by the end of March that year.

In 2017, it was reported that 112 offenders had been handed jail terms totalling nearly 500 years for abusing more than 270 victims.

== Gang members ==
The 18 gang members were convicted of nearly 100 offences:

Forename	Surname	Age	Of	Charges
Mohammed	Azram	35	Croydon Road	Convicted of conspiracy to incite prostitution, sexual assault, supplying drugs to a victim
Jahangir	Zaman	43	Hadrian Road	Convicted of conspiracy to incite prostitution, rape, supplying drugs to a victim
Nashir	Uddin	35	Joan Street	Convicted of conspiracy to incite prostitution, supplying drugs to a victim
Saiful	Islam	34	Strathmore Crescent	Convicted of rape. Jailed for 10 years
Mohammed Hassan	Ali	33	Bentinck Street	Convicted of sexual activity with a child, supplying drugs to a victim. Jailed for seven years
Yasser	Hussain	27	Canning Street	Convicted of beating, possession of drugs. Jailed for two years
Abdul	Sabe	40	Dean House	Convicted of conspiracy to incite prostitution, trafficking within the UK for sexual exploitation, drugs offences
Habibur	Rahim	34	Kenilworth Road	Convicted of causing or inciting prostitution, drugs, sexual assault, trafficking within the UK for sexual exploitation
Badrul	Hussain	37	Drybeck Court	Convicted of drug offences
Mohibur	Rahman	44	Northcote Street	Pleaded guilty to conspiracy to incite prostitution, supplying drugs to a victim
Abdulhamid	Minoyee	33	Gainsborough Grove	Convicted of rape, sexual assault, supply of drugs
Carolann	Gallon	22	Hareside Court	Pleaded guilty to three counts of trafficking
Monjour	Choudhury	33	Phillip Place	Convicted of conspiracy to incite prostitution, supplying drugs to a victim
Prabhat	Nelli	33	Sidney Grove	Convicted of conspiracy to incite prostitution, supplying drugs to a victim
Eisa	Mousavi	41	Todds Nook	Convicted of conspiracy to incite prostitution, rape, supplying drugs to a victim
Taherul	Alam	32	Normanton Terrace	Convicted of conspiracy to incite prostitution, supplying drugs to a victim, attempted sexual assault
Nadeem	Aslam	43	Belle Grove West	Convicted of supplying drugs to victims
Redwan	Siddquee	32	West Road	Pleaded guilty to supply or offering to supply a class B drug. Jailed for 16 months

== See also ==
- Child sexual abuse in the United Kingdom
- List of sexual abuses perpetrated by groups
