= Operation Voicer =

Child sexual abuse investigation in England

Operation Voicer was a major police investigation into serious sexual offences against pre-school aged children and infants across England, launched in 2014. The perpetrators groomed the families of the young victims, in some cases before the babies were even born. By September 2015, seven offenders were jailed, 28 further suspects had been arrested, three victims were identified, and 33 children were safeguarded. Ten offenders received significant prison sentences.

== Investigation ==
In September 2014, Adam Toms dialled 999 in an emotional state that made authorities fear for his welfare. When police visited his home, he admitted to sexually abusing a victim younger than five and was arrested. This prompted the launch of Operation Voicer, an investigation led by the UK's National Crime Agency (NCA) and involving seven local police forces – Avon and Somerset, Bedfordshire, Greater Manchester, Hampshire, Humberside, Sussex and Wiltshire.

By September 2015, seven offenders including a youth football coach were jailed, 28 further suspects had been arrested, including four teachers and two charity fundraisers. 33 children were safeguarded, three victims were identified and it was believed there could be more victims. The NCA's investigations deputy director Graham Gardner said the seven jailed men "demonstrated a determined ruthlessness" by finding "vulnerable babies and infants who were unable to protect themselves". The NCA's Andrew Quinn said the attacks were "the worst you could ever imagine. It does actually make me feel physically sick." More than 200 "intelligence packages" had been made available to law enforcement in other countries. Gardner said the network "has got tentacles that go round the world" and "this national investigation has now moved to an international one".

Three further offenders in the UK were jailed in May 2017, December 2018 and April 2019.

Several "exemplary" police officers were awarded judicial commendations by Judge Julian Lambert.

== Crimes ==
The perpetrators gang-raped and sexually abused infants after gaining access to them by grooming their families. They watched and encouraged each other's attacks online and streamed abuse footage to paedophiles around the world. Two members were HIV-positive. By 2015, three victims had been identified and investigators believed there are more.

One known victim was a baby whose parents were befriended by Robin Hollyson from Luton in Bedfordshire, already a registered sex offender. While Hollyson was babysitting, he raped the baby repeatedly, starting in December 2013. In May 2014, Hollyson, Adam Toms and Matthew Stansfield gang raped the baby, and distributed the footage online. Detective Inspector Jerry Waite at Bedfordshire Police said the crime was "truly sickening".

In April 2014, Adam Toms drugged and sexually assaulted a boy aged four, enabled further assaults by others including Christopher Knight, and distributed images of the attacks on the internet. Some attackers had driven hundreds of miles for the crime. The gang had exchanged advice about "date rape" drugs.

In July 2013, David Harsley, a hospital worker from Yorkshire and already a registered sex offender, engaged in sexual activity next to a boy aged four and livestreamed the abuse to Matthew Lisk and John Denham, who watched it remotely from a hotel near Heathrow Airport.

Another abuser linked to the gang engaged in sexualised online communication with a boy aged 14, assaulted a 12-year-old boy and abused an eight-year-old boy.

John Brown, from the NSPCC, said the crimes had a severity and a magnitude that was "difficult to comprehend" and could have life-long effects because "trauma can manifest itself in later years". The National Crime Agency explained that the effects will be "profound and long lasting". The family of a baby who had been raped found the crimes "very traumatic and distressing".

== Sentences ==
Seven men were jailed on 11 September 2015 for "the most horrific abuse of a baby and very young children". Six of them were also added to the sex offenders register permanently. Judge Julian Lambert lambasted the offenders as "evil beyond rational understanding" and said their "highly shocking" crimes "provoked tears in many and made others physically sick". He told the seven men, "In the worst nightmare, from the very deepest recesses of the mind, at the darkest hour of the night, few can have imagined the terrifying depravity which you men admit".

Three more abusers linked to the ring were jailed in May 2017, December 2018 and April 2019.

| Perpetrator | Conviction(s) | Sentence |
|---|---|---|
| Robin Hollyson ("Robin Fallick", "James King") | Rape of a baby, plotting the rape of an under 13 (three counts), sexually assaulting a child younger than 13, possession of indecent pictures of children | 24 years |
| Christopher Knight | Rape of a baby, plotting the rape of an under 13 (two counts), sexually assaulting a child younger than 13 (two counts), and capturing, sharing and possessing child pornography | 18 years |
| Adam Toms | Rape of a baby | 12 years |
| Matthew Stansfield | Plotting the rape a child younger than 13, child pornography offences | 10 years |
| John Denham ("Benjamin Harrop") | Plotting the sexual assault of an under 13, plotting to commit sex acts in a child's presence, child pornography offences. | 8 years |
| Matthew Lisk | Involvement in sexually abusing a child younger than 13 | 4 years |
| David Harsley | Sexual activity next to a boy aged four | 2 years |
| David Regan | Making and distributing indecent pictures of children, possessing extreme child sex abuse images and footage, selling and possessing class A drugs, possessing a class B drug | 5 years and 9 months |
| Matthew Law | Plotting the rape of a baby | 15 years |
| Mark Hatch | Encouraging the gang rape of a baby, inciting a child to participate in sexual activity, sharing indecent pictures of children. | 6 years and 8 months |

In January 2016, four months into his sentence, Robin Hollyson killed himself.
