= Peterborough sex abuse case =

Criminal case in the UK

The Peterborough sex abuse case involved 10 men who committed sexual offences against under-aged girls, some as young as 12, in the English city of Peterborough, Cambridgeshire. In a series of trials between 2013 and 2015, they were found guilty of rape, child prostitution and trafficking for sexual exploitation. Police had been alerted by the Rotherham and Rochdale child abuse cases to the possibility of abuse taking place.

== Crimes ==
The victims were of Czech, Slovak and English origin and typically vulnerable girls, some in local authority care, who were groomed with gifts of tobacco, free meals and apparent displays of affection and friendship by the older males who were targeting them. They were then persuaded to drink vodka or other strong alcoholic drinks and coerced into sexual acts. Some were subsequently trafficked as child prostitutes. The man whose activity prompted the police operation, Mohammed Khubaib, a 43-year-old restaurant-owner of Pakistani heritage, was described during his trial at the Old Bailey as having a "'persistent and almost predatory interest' in teenage girls". Khubaib also owned a lettings agency and took under-aged girls to flats under his control, where he and his friends would give them alcohol and play them sexually explicit music videos as part of the sexual grooming.

== Perpetrators ==
10 men were convicted from operation Erle:

| Name | Age | Crimes |
|---|---|---|
| Hassan Abdulla | 34 | Four counts of rape, and three counts of sexual activity with a child. |
| Renato Balog | 19 | Five counts of rape and four counts of sexual assault. |
| Jan Kandrac | 18 | Rape and two counts of sexual touching. |
| Yasir Ali | 29 | Four counts of rape, seven counts of trafficking for sexual exploitation, two counts of making indecent images of children, one count of engaging in sexual activity in the presence of a child and one count of intimidation of a witness/juror. |
| Daaim Ashraf | 20 | Five counts of trafficking for sexual exploitation, one count of sexual assault, one count of sexual activity with a child, one count of sexual activity in the presence of a child, and one count of intimidation of a witness/juror. |
| Mohammed Abbas | 30 | Two counts of sexual assault on a girl aged under 12 and two counts of sexual activity with a child. |
| 'Unnamed Child' | 14 | Sexual activity with a child. |
| Muhammed Waqas | 24 | Sexual activity with a girl aged between 13 and 15. |
| Zdeno Mirga | 18 | Inciting child prostitution, eight counts of rape and four counts of sexual activity with a child. |
| Mohammed Khubaib | 43 | Rape and grooming offences. |

== Reaction ==
Cambridgeshire Constabulary welcomed the convictions and praised the courage of the victims in giving evidence at the trials. A police spokesman said that police had "made great efforts to safeguard these young people, win their confidence and explore what they told us" and noted that the "victim-led" investigation, a joint initiative by Cambridgeshire police and Peterborough city council, had "formally beg[u]n in early January 2013". The Rotherham and Rochdale child abuse cases, had alerted police and council officials to the possibility that similar abuse was happening in the Peterborough area. One of Khubaib's victims said in a victim impact statement: "It was disgusting what he did to me. Before that happened, I was a typical 13-year-old who didn't know any better and thought that Mohammed was my friend who I had under my thumb. Now I know that he was the one with the control." A spokesman for the National Society for the Prevention of Cruelty to Children (NSPCC), a national charity campaigning for child welfare, said: "No child should experience what these girls have been through. Mohammed Khubaib subjected them to appalling ordeals but he will now have to pay for his crimes as a result of the victims' bravery in giving evidence."

== See also ==
- Grooming gangs scandal
- List of sexual abuses perpetrated by groups
