= Manchester child sex abuse ring =

British child sex abuse group

The Manchester child sex abuse ring was a group of men who committed serious sexual offences against under-aged girls in Manchester, England, between 2016 and 2018. Four members were jailed in September 2019, while others evaded arrest by fleeing the country.

== Crimes ==
The gang repeatedly raped underage girls in Manchester between 2016 and 2018. Greater Manchester Police said the abuse was perpetrated by a "sophisticated grooming operation by males operating in that area". Three victims aged 12 to 15 were identified.

The men groomed the victims by inundating them with Facebook messages asking them to meet them. Then the men brought the girls away to be raped. One 12-year-old girl was raped by at least four men. Another girl, aged 13, was groomed and made to have sex with a gang member three times. One of those times, she was kidnapped.

Superintendent Rebecca Boyce said the perpetrators, who are all Romanian, are "not representative of their wider [Romanian] community—‌they are four individuals within that community".

The impact on the victims was severe and prolonged. All of the known victims were forced to move out of Manchester to escape the abuse. One said: "No words can explain what I was put through. [...] Now I can't even go in my corner shop without being anxious or scared anymore. The impact this has had on my life has been unbelievable." Another said: "I feel sick when I think about what these people were doing. I think there might be even more victims that we don't know about."

== Operation Enfield ==
The crimes came to light when a victim's friend, who was also approached by the men, reported them to a care worker. Police responded by launching the investigation Operation Enfield in December 2017. They followed up this initial report by interviewing the victim's friends and discovered a second victim. A third victim was also identified and police said "we do believe there are other victims."

Four perpetrators were jailed in September 2019, while the operation continued. Others had evaded arrest by fleeing the country. Superintendent Rebecca Boyce of Greater Manchester Police thanked the victims for their "remarkable" courage in attending the trial after suffering "the most unimaginable and traumatic abuse". She said the girls were chosen as targets because "multiple vulnerabilities", mainly their age, made abusing them easy.

Cllr Garry Bridges, at Manchester City Council's Children's Services also praised the victims' courage, adding: "This case shows that those who would seek to prey on and sexually exploit vulnerable young people will be brought to justice. [...] These days we know a lot more about this sort of vile abuse and it's something we are working very closely with [the police] to identify and tackle."

== Sentences ==
In September 2019, Judge Suzanne Goddard QC jailed four of the abusers for a total of 25 years for their "appalling" crimes, which she condemned as "heartless, immoral and illegal". The four men were also placed on the sexual offenders register, three of them permanently. Three received sexual harm prevention orders of varying lengths. One had previously been jailed for dangerous driving.

Perpetrator	Age	Conviction(s)	Sentence
Parizian Calin (David)	20	Raping an under-13 (four counts), causing an under-13 to participate in sexual activity (two counts), arranging or facilitating a sexual offence against a child, sexually assaulting an under-13	13 years
Ilie Baltatu (Danny)	22	Grooming, illegally detaining a child, sex acts with a child (three counts), causing a child older than 13 to participate in sexual activity (two counts), sexually assaulting a child older than 13	8 years
Sebastian Baltatu	18	Raping an under-13	3 years
Adrian Calin	20	Causing a child to participate in sexual activity	1 year
