= National Audit on Group-based Child Sexual Exploitation and Abuse =

Government inquiry in the United Kingdom

The National Audit on Group-based Child Sexual Exploitation and Abuse, also known as the Casey audit, is a government audit of group-based child sexual exploitation in the United Kingdom. Prime minister Keir Starmer commissioned Louise Casey, Baroness Casey of Blackstock to conduct the audit in January 2025. The full report was published on 16 June 2025. As a result of the audit, the government has stated it will create a full statutory public inquiry into group-based child sexual exploitation.

== Comments ==
In her audit, Baroness Casey criticised many aspects of the previous investigations by police and local authorities. She said the young victims had often been treated as adults and criminals, and that major failings in data collection meant the ethnicity of offenders was not recorded in two-thirds of cases while the number of victims affected was likely underreported. She said that various authorities had discouraged the police from publicising convictions to avoid increasing ethnic tensions. Casey also said she had "found many examples" where organisations had avoided "examining whether there is disproportionality in ethnicity or cultural factors" in these crimes because of a "fear of appearing racist" or of increasing inter-community tensions.

Casey suggested the gaps in ethnicity data had led to competing and sometimes misleading claims, including by the media and academics, that had eroded trust in institutions. She wrote that claims most child sexual abuse offenders were white was "at best misleading" and that "it should always be a significant issue" when the white majority was "not in the majority of victims or perpetrators of crime".

Casey said "flawed data" had often been used to "dismiss claims about 'Asian grooming gangs' as sensationalised, biased or untrue". She suggested that recent data from Greater Manchester, South Yorkshire and West Yorkshire (covering the 2020s) suggested that British Pakistani men were disproportionately represented among perpetrators in those areas, although national data was insufficient to draw conclusions about ethnicity elsewhere. She concluded that "there have been enough convictions across the country of groups of men from Asian ethnic backgrounds to have warranted closer examination".

== Recommendations ==
The report made twelve recommendations, all of which the government has stated it will implement.

They are to:

1. change the law such that adults who sexually penetrate a child under 16 will automatically be charged with rape, with a "Romeo and Juliet clause" to protect children themselves against prosecution
2. launch a set of targeted national police operations and a national inquiry into child sexual exploitation (CSE) in England and Wales
3. review and disregard the convictions of CSE victims found to have been criminalised instead of protected
4. make collection of ethnicity and nationality data mandatory in CSE investigations
5. enforce and monitor mandatory sharing of information between agencies, to be monitored by multiple organizations including the forthcoming Child Protection Authority
6. introduce a consistent unique identifier system for children to aid in their identification in CSE investigations
7. upgrade relevant police IT systems, including enforcing the use of these identifiers
8. treat child exploitation cases like serious and organized crime
9. perform data reviews and analysis of a wide variety of data sources relating to CSE
10. commission research into the underlying social drivers for group-based child sexual exploitation
11. regulate the taxi industry more rigorously, including stopping "out-of-area" taxi services
12. commit to providing sufficient resources to implement the above recommendations over a multi-year period, including regular parliamentary review

== See also ==
- Child sexual abuse in the United Kingdom
- Independent Inquiry into Child Sexual Exploitation in Rotherham
