= Alexis Jay =

British academic (born 1949)

Alexis Jay CBE
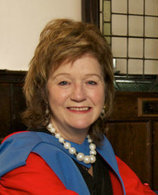
- Jay in 2016

Chair of the Independent Inquiry into Child Sexual Abuse
- In office 11 August 2016 – 20 October 2022
- Appointed by: Amber Rudd (as Home Secretary)
- Preceded by: Dame Lowell Goddard

Personal details
- Born: Alexandrina Henderson Farmer; 25 April 1949 (age 77) Edinburgh, Scotland
- Occupation: Professor, social work leader

Alexandrina Henderson Farmer Jay, CBE (born 25 April 1949) is a British academic. She is visiting professor at the University of Strathclyde and the independent chair of the Centre for Excellence for Children's Care and Protection (CELCIS).

Following the resignation of Justice Lowell Goddard, Home Secretary Amber Rudd announced on 11 August 2016 that Jay had been appointed to chair the Independent Inquiry into Child Sexual Abuse, of which she had previously been a Panel member.

Jay is a former senior social worker. She was previously chief social work adviser to the Scottish Government and a former president of the Association of Directors of Social Work.

== Early life ==
Jay was born in Edinburgh. Her father, who was a carpenter, died following an industrial accident when she was two. She studied social work at Moray House School of Education, now part of the University of Edinburgh.

== Career ==
In 2005, she took up the post of chief social work inspector at the Social Work Inspection Agency (SWIA), a government organisation scrutinising all aspects of social services provided by local authorities in Scotland. She was chief executive and chief social work inspector until the functions of SWIA and the Care Commission were taken over by the Care Inspectorate in 2011. She remained as chief social work inspector to the Scottish Government until early 2013.

== Expert role in independent inquiries ==
She led the Independent Inquiry into Child Sexual Exploitation in Rotherham, an investigation into child sexual abuse in the Metropolitan Borough of Rotherham in South Yorkshire. She is the author of the investigation's report, published in August 2014.

In September 2014 she was appointed to act as an expert adviser to an independent panel inquiry which was intended to examine how the UK's institutions have handled their duties to protect children from sexual abuse. Following the abandonment of the initial panel inquiry in favour of a statutory inquiry, she was re-appointed as an adviser to the subsequent Independent Inquiry into Child Sexual Abuse chaired by Dame Lowell Goddard. After Goddard resigned as chair, it was announced on 11 August 2016 that Jay had been appointed to chair the Inquiry. The inquiry published its final report on 20 October 2022.

== Church of England role ==
On 20 July 2023, it was announced that the archbishops of Canterbury and York had appointed Alexis Jay to provide proposals for an independent system of safeguarding for the Church of England.

== Honours ==
She was appointed Officer of the Order of the British Empire (OBE) in the 2012 Birthday Honours, and Commander of the Order of the British Empire (CBE) in the 2024 New Year Honours for services to the prevention of child sexual abuse.
