= Sexual grooming =

Sexual abuse compliance method

Sexual grooming is the action or behavior used to establish an emotional connection with a vulnerable person who is typically, but not always, under the age of consent (which varies by jurisdiction) and sometimes with the victim's family, to lower their inhibitions with the objective of sexual abuse. It can occur in various settings, including online, in person, and through other means of communication. Children who are groomed may experience mental health issues, including "anxiety, depression, post-traumatic stress, and suicidal thoughts".

== History and recognition ==
=== Origins ===
Before the term "grooming" was associated with grooming a child for sexual abuse, it had come to have a meaning of mentorship, coaching, or preparing someone for leadership.

From 1975 to 1985, law enforcement in the United States became increasingly aware of child sexual abuse that happened to children from outside their family, committed by those who were not strangers. Previously, the focus of law enforcement had been on "stranger danger" and those who used threats of violence to ensure compliance from their victims. In these newly recognized sexual abuse cases, children were manipulated with a "combination of attention, affection, kindness, gifts, alcohol, drugs, money, and privileges". While there are examples before this time where the pattern was recognized, it was during this decade that the FBI became aware of the pattern and criminal investigations were first taken seriously in the United States. There was also growing awareness that offenders joined youth-serving organizations to gain access to potential victims.

As an example, a 1977 study used the terminology "pressured sexual contacts" and "forced sex contacts" to distinguish two types of offenders. Sex-pressure offenses had a lack of physical force and behavior that was counter-aggressive, using "persuasion of reward, attention, affection, money, gifts, or entrapment". "Sex-force offenses" used the threat of harm or physical force, such as "intimidation, verbal threat, restraint, manipulation, and physical strength".

Ken Lanning is credited with being one of the first professionals to use the term "grooming". He recalls it being used in conversations between law enforcement professionals, and pinpoints the first known written description of the process of child grooming to a 1979 book written by Nicholas Groth, and the first printed use of the word "grooming" to a 1984 article by Jon Conte. At the beginning of its use, both grooming and seduction were being used to describe this type of non-violent offender, and Lanning recalls using both terms interchangeably.

A January 1984 FBI Law Enforcement Bulletin used "seduction" and being "seduced" to describe the activity of non-violent offenders. By 1985, the Chicago Tribune had used the term, reporting "These 'friendly molesters' become acquainted with their targeted victim, gaining their trust while secretly grooming the child as a sexual partner."

In the 1980s, the public in the United States became increasingly aware of child sexual abuse through the nursery school cases and abuse in religious settings.

=== Changing meaning ===
During the 1990s, the term "grooming" was increasingly used to replace "seduction" as the most commonly used term. However, there was not "one official, legal, mental health, or even lay definition" of grooming. Growing awareness of chat rooms being used by pedophiles to target victims came to public notice, and the use of "grooming" to mean "to win the confidence of (a victim) in order to commit sexual assault on him or her" became mainstream. In academia, the description of grooming strategies in online cases became distinct from the descriptions of pre-Internet grooming strategies.

In 2008, a BBC report stated that "grooming" had taken on a pejorative meaning; no longer associated with animal care or mentoring, it had become associated with pedophiles and pedophilia. This caused outrage when the term "groomed" was used to describe the behavior of someone who had obtained leaked documents from a civil servant. The news report mentioned other uses of the term "groom" that also had negative connotation, such as "groomed for terrorism" or "groomed to become suicide bombers".

A 2022 report by the Christian Science Monitor, reported that the word "grooming" was now seen as "sinister". Instead of meaning "to prepare as a political candidate ... to prepare or coach for a career", the term had shifted in public discourse to mean "to befriend or influence (a child), now esp. via the internet, in preparation for future sexual abuse". "Grooming" is also increasingly used in political commentary to mean "indoctrination" or "brainwashing".

== Patterns ==
=== Non-violent offenders ===
To establish a good relationship with a child and the child's family, child groomers might do several things: they might try to gain the child's or parents' trust by befriending them, with the goal of easy access to the child. A trusting relationship with the family means the child's parents are less likely to believe potential accusations. Child groomers might look for opportunities to have time alone with the child, which can be done by offering to babysit; the groomers may also invite the child for sleepovers, for opportunistic bed sharing. They might give gifts or money to the child in exchange for sexual contact, or simply because they like or love them. Commonly, they show pornography to the child, or talk about sexual topics with the child, hoping to make it easy for the child to accept such acts, thus normalizing the behavior. They may also engage in hugging, kissing, or other physical contact, even when the child does not want it.

When grooming techniques are successful, the resulting compliance of the child can be mis-interpreted as consent and the child treated as if they were not a victim of crime. When the behavior is considered criminal, it can still be perceived as a lesser offense.

Some offenders prefer sexual gratification from less obvious types of behaviors, and grooming behaviors in and of themselves are the goal as they provide a chance to engage in a paraphilia.

Signs that characterize child groomers include a person who tries to communicate with a child online or in person in secret, outside the knowledge of the child's parents or guardians, a person who attempts to isolate a child from their friends or family, or who discourages the child from spending time with others, or a person who asks a child to keep secrets or who makes the child feel like they are special or important in a way that is inappropriate.

== Impact on victims ==
Grooming has devastating impacts on victims, damaging their sense of self, eroding their ability to trust others, and severely impacting mental health. Children who are groomed may feel they are to blame for their abuse, and have difficulty placing blame on the perpetrator. Survivors may perceive aspects of human connection as threat cues, and thus may find it difficult to fully engage mentally with simple positive interactions, such as affirmation or compliments.

Many grooming tactics involve isolating a victim through fostering distrust or otherwise sabotaging other close relationships. This directly weakens the potential support network to process traumatic experiences, increasing the risk of long-term psychological ramifications. Victims can be left having been both isolated from existing social connections, and finding it difficult to form new ones.

== Criminal offences ==
Because sexual grooming is a non-violent and non-threatening form of child sexual abuse, it includes behaviors that do not appear inappropriate on the surface, as the behavior is designed to control and conceal a sexual relationship with the victim. The behavior becomes a criminal act in the United States when one tries to "persuade, induce, entice, or coerce" a minor to engage in sexual activity. As awareness of non-violent offenders has grown, States like Illinois have passed legislation that bans enticement similar to the federal law.

Other examples of child sexual abuse offenses include "Solicitation of a Minor" and "Indecent Liberties with a Child". In Kansas, "Aggravated Indecent Liberties with a Child" is used when an abuser has sex with the child. In Arkansas, the statute is "Sexual indecency with a child".

== Related topics ==
=== Loverboy or Romeo pimps ===
In some contexts, such as the UK grooming gangs scandal, the behavior of Loverboy or Romeo Pimps has been described as 'grooming' by the media. Loverboy is a method used to lure young people into sexual exploitation and prostitution, where the target is initially approached romantically by the exploiter. The goal is to exploit the target, usually in the sex industry. Unlike non-violent offenders, once ensnared, victims face blackmail and violence to maintain their compliance.

=== Online enticement ===
Grooming is also used to describe befriending a child on the Internet, in preparation for future sexual abuse.

Sexual predation of children on the Internet mostly consists of adults using the Internet to meet and seduce minors into sexual encounters. Some abusers (sometimes posing as children themselves) chat with children online and make arrangements to meet with them in person. Internet initiated sex crimes against people under the age of consent are most commonly committed against the 13–17 age group (99% of cases), and particularly 13–14 (48%). The majority of targeted children are girls, and most victimization occurs with mobile-phone support. Minors who are highly curious and high-sensation-seeking are at higher risk than others.

Pedophiles and predators use online grooming to carry out cybersex trafficking crimes. After the pedophile gains the trust from a local cybersex trafficker, often a parent or neighbor of the victim, the online sexual exploitation will take place.

== See also ==
- Abusive power and control
- Children's rights
- Lolita
- Online predator
- Relationship between child pornography and child sexual abuse
- Sexualization in child beauty pageants
