= Stephen Batchelor (author) =

Scottish Buddhist author and teacher (born 1953)

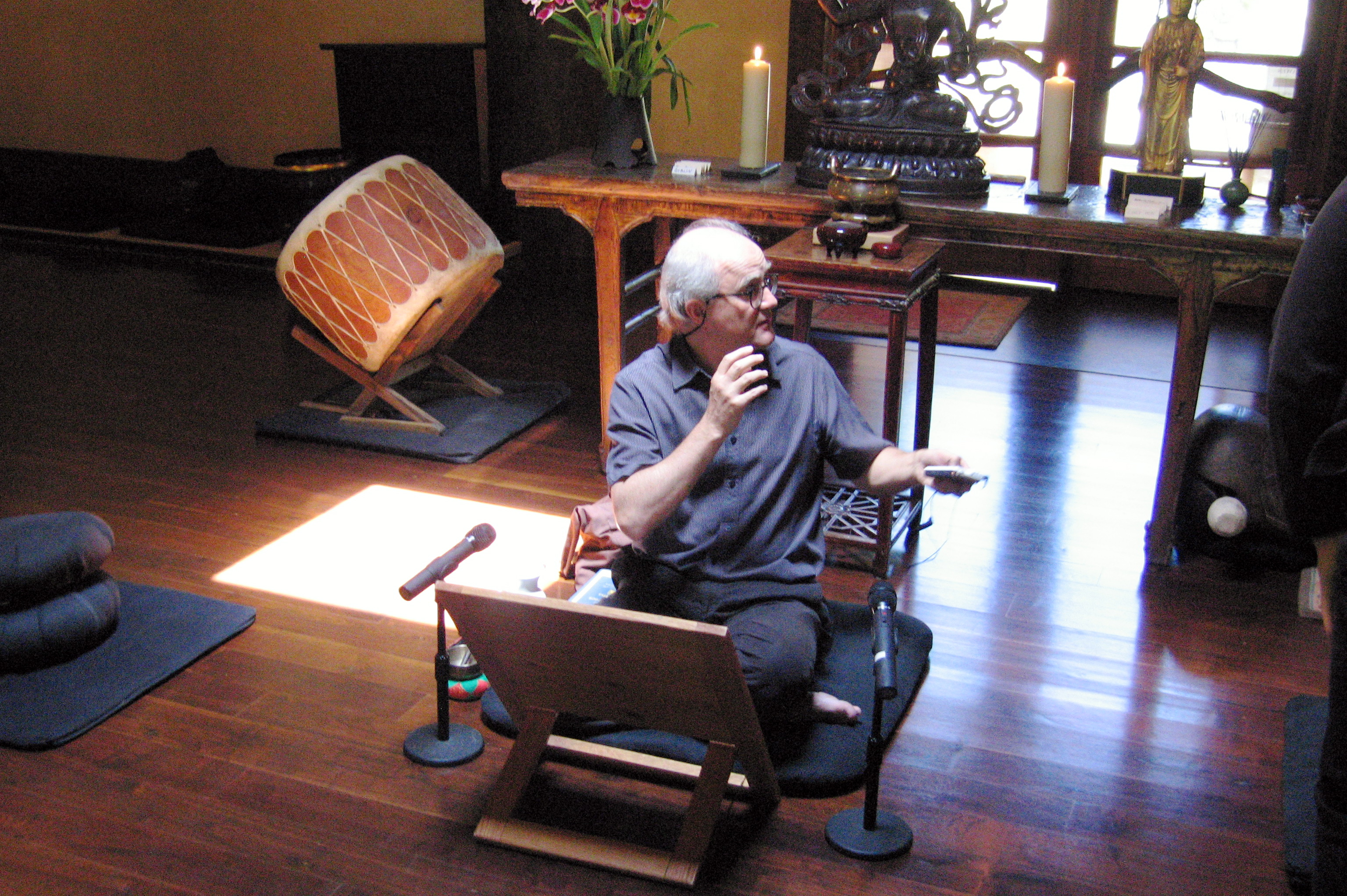
- Batchelor at Upaya Zen Center in New Mexico
- Born: 7 April 1953 (age 73); Dundee, Scotland
- Occupations: Buddhist author, teacher
- Spouse: Martine Batchelor (m. 1985)
- Website: stephenbatchelor.org

Stephen Batchelor (born 7 April 1953) is a Scottish Buddhist author and teacher, known for his writings on Buddhist subjects and his leadership of meditation retreats worldwide. He is a noted proponent of agnostic or secular Buddhism.

== Early life and early education ==
Batchelor was born in Dundee, Scotland, in 1953. When he was three years old, his family relocated briefly to Toronto, Ontario, Canada, where his parents separated. He relocated with his mother Phyllis (b. 1913) to England, where he was raised in a humanist environment with his younger brother David in Watford, Hertfordshire. Batchelor attended Watford Grammar School for Boys, leaving in February 1972.

== Buddhism studies and career ==
At the age of eighteen, he embarked on an overland journey which eventually led him to India. He settled in Dharamsala, the capital-in-exile of the Dalai Lama, and studied with Geshé Ngawang Dhargyey at the Library of Tibetan Works and Archives. He was ordained as a novice monk in the Gelug tradition in 1974. A few months after ordination, he sat a ten-day Vipassana meditation retreat with the Indian teacher S.N. Goenka, which proved a lasting influence on his practice, and aroused his curiosity about other traditions of Buddhism.

He left India in 1975 to study Tibetan Buddhist philosophy and doctrine under the guidance of Geshe Rabten. He initially studied at the Tibet Institute Rikon and later in Le Mont-Pèlerin, both located in Switzerland. During this time, he also assisted Geshé Rabten in establishing the Tharpa Choeling, which is now known as Rabten Choeling. The following year, he received full ordination as a monk. In 1979, he moved to Germany to work as a translator for Geshé Thubten Ngawang at the Tibetisches Institut in Hamburg.

In April 1981, Batchelor travelled to Songgwangsa Monastery in South Korea to undertake training in Zen Buddhism under the guidance of Kusan Sunim. At the monastery, he met Martine Fages, a Frenchwoman who had ordained as a nun in 1975. He remained in Korea until the autumn of 1984, when he left for a pilgrimage to Buddhist sites in Japan, China and Tibet.

Following the death of Kusan Sunim, Batchelor and Martine Fages laicised in February 1985 and married in Hong Kong, then returned to England and joined the Sharpham North Community, near Totnes, Devon. Over the course of the next fifteen years Batchelor lived at Sharpham, he became coordinator of the Sharpham Trust (1992) and co-founder of the Sharpham College for Buddhist Studies and Contemporary Enquiry (1996). Throughout this period, he worked as a Buddhist chaplain at Channings Wood Prison. From 1990 he has been a Guiding Teacher at Gaia House meditation centre in Devon and since 1992 a contributing editor of Tricycle: The Buddhist Review. In August 2000, he and Martine moved to Aquitaine, France, where they live in a village near Bordeaux.

Batchelor is a member of the core faculty of Bodhi College, which focuses on interpreting the early texts of Buddhism, such as the Pali Canon, in a manner applicable to the modern world. He is also a member of the Advisory Board of the Center for Pragmatic Buddhism.

=== Secular Buddhism ===
Batchelor argues for a secular, naturalistic Buddhism, devoid of supernatural frameworks. As a lay Buddhist author, teacher, and self-designated scholar, he has increasingly turned his attention to the earliest teachings of Buddhism as recorded in the Pali canon. Additionally, he has shown an increasing interest in Hellenistic philosophies, particularly the skeptical philosophy of Pyrrhonism and Montaigne's approach to Pyrrhonism.

== Works ==
=== Books ===
- Batchelor, Stephen. Alone with Others: An Existential Approach to Buddhism. Foreword by John Blofeld. Grove Press, 1983 ISBN 0-8021-5127-2.
- Batchelor, Stephen. Flight: An Existential Conception of Buddhism. Buddhist Publication Society, Wheel Publication No. 316/317. 1984.
- Batchelor, Stephen (editor). The Jewel in the Lotus: A Guide to the Buddhist Traditions of Tibet. Wisdom Publications, 1986. ISBN 0-86171-048-7.
- Batchelor, Stephen. The Tibet Guide. Foreword by the Dalai Lama. Wisdom Publications, 1987. ISBN 0-86171-046-0. (Revised edition: The Tibet Guide: Central and Western Tibet. Wisdom Publications, 1998. ISBN 0-86171-134-3.)
- Batchelor, Stephen. The Faith to Doubt: Glimpses of Buddhist Uncertainty. Parallax Press, 1990. ISBN 0-938077-22-8.
- Batchelor, Stephen. The Awakening of the West: The Encounter of Buddhism and Western Culture. Parallax Press, 1994. ISBN 9780938077688.
- Batchelor, Stephen. Buddhism Without Beliefs. Riverhead Books, 1997. ISBN 1-57322-058-2.
- Batchelor, Stephen. Living with the Devil: A Meditation on Good and Evil.. Penguin Books/Riverhead Books, 2005. ISBN 1-59448-087-7
- Batchelor, Stephen. Confession of a Buddhist Atheist. Random House, 2010. ISBN 0-385-52706-3.
- Batchelor, Stephen. After Buddhism: Rethinking the Dharma for a Secular Age. Yale University Press, 2015.
- Batchelor, Stephen. Secular Buddhism: Imagining the Dharma in an Uncertain World. Yale University Press, 2017. ISBN 978-0-300-22323-1
- Batchelor, Martine and Batchelor, Stephen. What is this? Ancient questions for modern minds. Tuwhiri, 2019. ISBN 978-0-473-47497-3
- Batchelor, Stephen. The Art of Solitude. Yale University Press, 2020. ISBN 0300250932
- Batchelor, Stephen. Buddha, Socrates, and Us: Ethical Living in Uncertain Times. Yale University Press, 2025. ISBN 0300275498

=== Articles and book-chapters ===
- Mackenzie, Vicki. "Life as a Question, Not as a Fact: Stephen Batchelor – author, teacher and skeptic." Why Buddhism? Westerners in Search of Wisdom. HarperCollins, 2003. ISBN 0-00-713146-1. pp. 142–62.
- Batchelor, Stephen. "A Secular Buddhism". Journal of Global Buddhism 13 (2012):87-107

=== Editor ===
- Kusan Sunim. The Way of Korean Zen. Translated by Martine Fages Batchelor. Edited with an introduction by Stephen Batchelor. Weatherhill, 1985. ISBN 0-8348-0201-5. (2nd Revised Edition: Weatherhill, 2009. ISBN 1-59030-686-4.)
- Watson, Gay, Stephen Batchelor and Guy Claxton (editors). The Psychology of Awakening: Buddhism, Science, and Our Day-to-Day Lives. Weiser Books, 2000. ISBN 1-57863-172-6.

=== Translations ===
- Shantideva. A Guide to the Bodhisattva's Way of Life. Translated by Stephen Batchelor. Library of Tibetan Works and Archives, 1979. ISBN 81-85102-59-7.
- Rabten, Geshé. Echoes of Voidness. Translated and edited by Stephen Batchelor. Wisdom Publications, 1983. ISBN 0-86171-010-X
- Rabten, Geshé. Song of the Profound View. Translated and annotated by Stephen Batchelor. Wisdom Publications, 1989. ISBN 0-86171-086-X.
- Batchelor, Stephen. Verses from the Center: A Buddhist Vision of the Sublime. Riverhead Books, 2001. ISBN 1-57322-876-1. This is a translation of the Mūlamadhyamakakārikā (Fundamental Verses on the Middle Way) by Nagarjuna.

=== Photography ===
- Batchelor, Martine. Meditation for Life. Photography by Stephen Batchelor. Wisdom Publications, 2001. ISBN 0-86171-302-8.

=== Libretto ===
Batchelor authored the libretto for MĀRA: A Chamber Opera on Good and Evil (2017). Its music was composed by Sherry Woods.

== See also ==
- Martine Batchelor
- Buddhism in Europe
- Christopher Titmuss
- Secular Buddhism
