= Anthony Steen =

British politician and barrister

Anthony Steen CBE

Member of Parliament
- In office 28 February 1974 – 12 April 2010
- Preceded by: John Tilney
- Succeeded by: Sarah Wollaston
- Constituency: Liverpool Wavertree (1974–1983); South Hams (1983–1997); Totnes (1997–2010)

Personal details
- Born: 22 July 1939 (age 87) Marylebone, London, England
- Party: Conservative
- Spouse: Carolyn Padfield
- Education: University College, London

Anthony David Steen CBE (born 22 July 1939) is a former British Conservative Party politician and barrister. He was a Member of Parliament (MP) from 1974 to 2010, and the Chairman of the Human Trafficking Foundation. Having represented Totnes in Devon since 1997, he was previously MP for South Hams from 1983, and had also been the MP for Liverpool Wavertree between February 1974 and 1983. From 1992 to 1994, he was Parliamentary Private Secretary (PPS) to Peter Brooke MP as Secretary of State for Culture, Media and Sport.

Steen is widely acknowledged as one of the leading figures acting to combat human trafficking in the United Kingdom, and in 2015 he was appointed a CBE in recognition of his contribution to the fight against modern slavery. In February 2016, Steen and Baron Randall of Uxbridge were appointed special envoys on modern slavery to the Mayor of London.

== Early life ==
Anthony David Steen was born in July 1939 to Stephen Nicholas Steen (formerly Stein), one time chairman and president of Smith & Nephew, and Jacqueline Annette, daughter of William (formerly Wolko or Woolf) Slavouski, a Russian fur and skin trader. He attended Westminster School and University College London where he gained an LLB. He became a barrister in 1962.

Steen worked at the Bernhard Baron Settlement as a youth club leader with Sir Basil Henriques, an East London magistrate, from 1959 to 1967. Whilst at the Settlement, in 1964, he founded Task Force, an organisation to enable young people to help the elderly, and served as its director from 1964 to 1968, employing 50 full-time staff. By 1967, Task Force had recruited 15,000 young volunteers, in their teens and twenties, from across London to help with over 7,000 vulnerable elderly and lonely people living within the 32 London boroughs. They offered practical work such as gardening, shopping, redecorating. Task Force worked with the majority of London boroughs and its units have, over the years, since been assimilated either within those local authorities' budgets or joined forces with existing non-governmental organizations working with the elderly. The Task Force Trust was launched in 1974 to raise additional money for youth volunteering. he Trust continues to exist and is presently funding projects which link asylum-seekers with local communities.

In 1963, Sir John Foster, then MP for Northwich, highlighted Steen's work in an adjournment debate in the House of Commons. As a result, Christopher Chataway MP, a junior minister for education (from 1962 to 1964), offered government funding for Task Force. The subsequent government, under Prime Minister Harold Wilson, asked Steen to head up a national equivalent to Task Force. The Young Volunteer Force Foundation (YVFF) was launched in 1968 at 10 Downing Street, with the object of recruiting young people throughout the UK to tackle community and social problems, to encourage altruism, promote people to care for those less fortunate than themselves. YVFF employed around 100 young people. The chairman was Selwyn Lloyd MP, a former Chancellor and Foreign Secretary, and the Vice-Chairmen were Jo Grimond MP, Leader of the Liberal Party, and Douglas Houghton MP, Chairman of the Labour Party. Projects were launched in England, Scotland and Wales, resulting in greater community involvement and social awareness. The Young Volunteer Force was subsequently renamed the Community Development Foundation. Steen was its first director, serving from 1968 to 1974. It was the largest organisation of its kind, and attracted over £1 million of government grant annually.

In 1981, Miles Copeland, manager of the pop group The Police, invited Steen to be Chairman of the Outlandos Trust, a charity funded by Police concerts. It provided musical instruments for musically gifted but underprivileged young people. The Trust distributed over £180,000 worth of musical instruments. In 1978, Steen set up Thatcher's, a fund-raising tearoom in Liverpool, which was opened by Margaret Thatcher, then Leader of the Opposition. Run by the local Conservative association, it raised money for local charities. From 1991 to 2010, Steen was a Trustee of the Dartington International Summer School, having been an aspiring young pianist. From 1993 to 2012, he was a trustee of Education Extra, a charity set up by Lord Young of Dartington to promote after-school activities in areas of urban deprivation.

== Legal career ==
Steen was a pupil in Heathcote Williams QC, Leonard Caplan QC Chambers, and was offered a tenancy by Sir John Foster MP QC in his Hare Court Chambers. He was called to the Bar in 1962 (Gray's Inn) and practised as a barrister in landlord and tenant and common law from 1962 to 1974. He worked on the Court Martial's Defence Counsel for the Ministry of Defence from 1964 to 1968, lectured in law for the Council of Legal Education, 1964–67, and acted for the National Union of Headteachers from 1968 to 1972. He championed pro bono legal advice at the Mary Ward Advice Centre. In 1970–71, he served as an adviser to federal and provincial Canadian governments on unemployment and youth issues. He retired from the Bar in 1983.

== Parliamentary career ==
=== Roles ===
Steen served as Member of Parliament for Liverpool Wavertree from February 1974 to 1983, and for Totnes from 1983 to 2010 (South Hams 1983 to 1997).

In the House of Commons, Steen served as a member of the Select Committee on Immigration and Race Relations (1975–79), as vice-chairman of the Select Committee on Social Services (1979–81) and subsequently as a member of that committee (1990–95), as vice-chairman of the Select Committee on the Environment (1983–85), and subsequently as a member of that committee (1991–94), as chairman of the Urban and Inner City Committee (1987–92), as a member of the European Scrutiny Committee (1997-2010). He was also chairman of the group of Conservative MPs elected in the 1974 general elections, and chaired the Conservative backbench committees on youth and young children (1976–79) and urban affairs and new towns (1979–83), and served as chairman of the Conservative Deregulation Committee (1993–97) and of the West Country Members’ Group (1992–94). He was also vice-chairman of the All-Party Fisheries Committee (1997–2010), chairman of the All-Party Group on Trafficking of Women and Children (2006–10), chairman of the backbench Sane Planning Group (1987–92), and a member of the Parliamentary Population and Development Group (1987–92). He was elected by Conservative MPs as secretary of the Conservative Backbench 1922 Committee (2001–10).

From 1992 to 1994, Steen served as Parliamentary Private Secretary (PPS) to the Rt Hon Peter Brooke MP when the latter was Secretary of State for Culture, Media and Sport in John Major's government.

=== Activity ===
In 1981, Aims of Industry, a right-wing neoliberal pressure group that served as a front for the Conservative Party, published Steen's New Life in Old Cities, in which he proposed to auction off surplus public land. In 1984, Steen launched a parliamentary campaign for measures to accelerate the privatisation of public land, claiming without evidence that vast amounts of it lay unused, and accusing local and public authorities of hoarding land. In 1985, Steen piloted the Dartmoor Commons Bill through Parliament. In 1986, he invoked the danger from private developers to greenfield land and city green belts, protected under the British planning system, as an argument for privatising non-green public land, including council estates.

In 1993–94, his three Ten Minute Rule bills on deregulation contributed to the Major government's Deregulation Initiative. In 1994, he initiated a Ten Minute Rule bill known as the French Language Bill, which proposed to ban the use of words of French origin in the UK, to 'highlight the bizarre situation', as he put it, whereby the French National Assembly and Senate had recently passed legislation banning the use of English words and expressions, such 'software', 'tee-shirt' and 'hamburger', in France. A 'tongue in cheek' initiative, it would have been administered by traffic wardens. In 2000, he initiated a private member's bill on urban regeneration and protection of the countryside.

In his role as chairman of the All-Party Parliamentary Group on the Trafficking of Women and Children, Steen did much to raise awareness of human trafficking in the UK.. In February 2010, Steen saw his private member's bill to establish a national Anti-Slavery Day adopted by the House of Commons, as the Anti-Slavery Day Act. Since then there have been two annual events to mark Anti-Slavery Day – on 18 October each year – and to raise awareness of the issue of human trafficking in the UK. In 2011, activities took place across the country, including a reception at 10 Downing Street to mark the occasion, hosted by Prime Minister David Cameron, whilst the inaugural Human Trafficking Foundation Media Awards, when the Commons Speaker and Home Secretary give awards to journalists, broadcasters and film makers in recognition of their fight to end slavery, took place at Westminster.

Viewed as on the centre-left of the Conservative Party, Steen backed Kenneth Clarke's three leadership bids in 1997, 2001 and 2005. In 2001, he denounced the supporters of Iain Duncan Smith as 'bigots'. Steen describes himself as a 'Euro-pragmatist' and was in favour of continued UK membership of the European Union, voting to remain in the June 2016 referendum.

=== Expenses scandal ===
In May 2009, Steen was involved in the parliamentary expenses scandal. He was reported by The Daily Telegraph to have claimed over £87,000 on his constituency mansion which he designated as his second home. Expenses included items for rabbit fencing, tree surgery (his home is surrounded by 500 trees, he also claimed for their inspection,) woodland consultants and bore hole maintenance. As a result, he announced he would not contest the next general election.

=== Campaign against Human Trafficking ===
Since 2005, Steen has concentrated on issues related to modern-day slavery and human trafficking. In 2006, he established the All-Party Parliamentary Group on Human Trafficking of Women and Children, with the then Speaker of the House of Commons, Michael Martin MP as its first president. He campaigned for the UK to sign the European Convention of Action against Trafficking in Human Beings. In October 2007, he was awarded the Children's Champion Award in recognition of his advocacy of the rights of trafficked children in the UK.

In 2010, Steen established the Human Trafficking Foundation, an organisation (of which he is executive chairman) that works with NGOs and charities in the sector combatting human trafficking around the UK.The foundation has worked with ECPAT UK and Asociata High Level Group for Children (Romania) to establish 'Parliamentarians Against Human Trafficking', a Europe-wide project to forge a network of parliamentarians across the continent fighting human trafficking.

In 2015, Steen served as special envoy to the prime minister and to Parliament's Joint Select Committee on the draft Modern Slavery Bill. In February 2016, Steen and Baron Randall of Uxbridge were appointed special envoys on modern slavery to the mayor of London. In October 2018, Steen was appointed a specialist adviser, representing NGOs and civil society, on a review into the operation of the Modern Slavery Act. In November 2018, he was appointed specialist adviser on modern slavery to the Home Affairs Select Committee in the House of Commons.

== Personal life ==
He married Carolyn Padfield in 1966. She is a child psychologist. They have a son, Jason, who has a consultancy in London specialising in aviation and is married with two children, living in London, and a daughter, Xanthe, who is a qualified teacher and has worked as a television presenter and writer in London.

Parliament of the United Kingdom
Preceded by John Tilney	Member of Parliament for Liverpool Wavertree; 28 February 1974 – 9 June 1983	Succeeded by Constituency abolished
Preceded by Constituency created	Member of Parliament for South Hams; 9 June 1983 – 1 May 1997	Succeeded by Constituency abolished
Preceded by Constituency created	Member of Parliament for Totnes; 1 May 1997 – 7 May 2010	Sarah Wollaston
