= South Hams (constituency) =

UK Parliament constituency (1983–1997)

- Former county constituency for the House of Commons
- South Hams in Devon, showing boundaries used from 1983 to 1997.
- County: Devon
- Major settlements: Totnes, Ivybridge, Brixham, part of Paignton

1983–1997
- Seats: One
- Created from: Totnes, Torbay and Devon West
- Replaced by: Totnes and Devon South West

South Hams was a county constituency based on the South Hams district of Devon. It returned one Member of Parliament (MP) to the House of Commons of the Parliament of the United Kingdom. The constituency was created for the 1983 general election, and abolished for the 1997 general election. The constituency covered a vast part of the English Riviera on the south Devon coast.

== History ==
This was a safe seat for the Conservative Party. During the fourteen years and three parliaments of its existence, it was held by a single member, Anthony Steen.

In the 1987 general election the well-known Labour MP and staunch republican Willie Hamilton contested the seat, finishing third.

== Boundaries ==
The District of South Hams wards of Avon and Harbourne, Avonleigh, Bickleigh and Shaugh, Brixton, Charterlands, Cornwood and Harford, Dart Valley, Dartington, Dartmouth Clifton, Dartmouth Hardness, Erme Valley, Garabrook, Ivybridge, Kingsbridge, Kingswear, Malborough, Marldon, Modbury, Newton and Noss, Salcombe, Saltstone, Skerries, South Brent, Sparkwell, Stoke Gabriel, Stokenham, Thurlestone, Totnes, Totnes Bridgetown, Ugborough, West Dart, Wembury, and Yealmpton, and the Borough of Torbay wards of Blatchcombe, Furzeham with Churston, and St Peter's with St Mary's.

The main towns of this South Devon constituency were Totnes and Ivybridge. It was divided in 1997 to form parts of the new constituencies of Totnes and Devon South West.

== Members of Parliament ==
Election	Member	Party
1983	Anthony Steen	Conservative
1997	constituency abolished: see Totnes and Devon South West	

== Elections ==
=== Elections in the 1980s ===
General election 1983: South Hams
Party	Candidate	Votes	%	±%
Conservative	Anthony Steen	31,855	57.24	
Liberal	Anthony H. Rogers	19,454	34.96	
Labour	Graham Morris	3,824	6.87	
Ecology	Wendy Morgan	518	0.93	
Majority		12,401	22.28	
Turnout		55,133	74.92	
Conservative hold		Swing		

General election 1987: South Hams
Party	Candidate	Votes	%	±%
Conservative	Anthony Steen	34,218	55.4	
Liberal	Robert Chave	21,072	34.09	
Labour	Willie Hamilton	5,060	8.2	
Green	Christopher Titmuss	1,178	1.9	
Monster Raving Loony	Timothy Langsford	277	0.45	New
Majority		13,146	21.3	
Turnout		61,805	78.6	
Conservative hold		Swing		

=== Elections in the 1990s ===
General election 1992: South Hams
Party	Candidate	Votes	%	±%
Conservative	Anthony Steen	35,951	53.4	−2.0
Liberal Democrats	RV Evans	22,240	33.0	−1.1
Labour	E Cohen	8,091	12.0	+3.8
Green	Christopher Titmuss	846	1.3	−0.6
Natural Law	LJ Somerville	227	0.3	New
Majority		13,711	20.4	−0.9
Turnout		67,355	81.0	+2.3
Conservative hold		Swing	−0.5	

== See also ==
- List of parliamentary constituencies in Devon
