= Titmuss =

Titmuss is a surname. Notable people with the surname include:

- Abi Titmuss (born 1976), English actress, television personality and poker player
- Christopher Titmuss (born 1944), British Dharma teacher
- Richard Titmuss (1907–1973), British social researcher and teacher
- Fred Titmuss, (1898–1966) English footballer
