= Anti-Slavery Day =

UK commemoration, 18 October

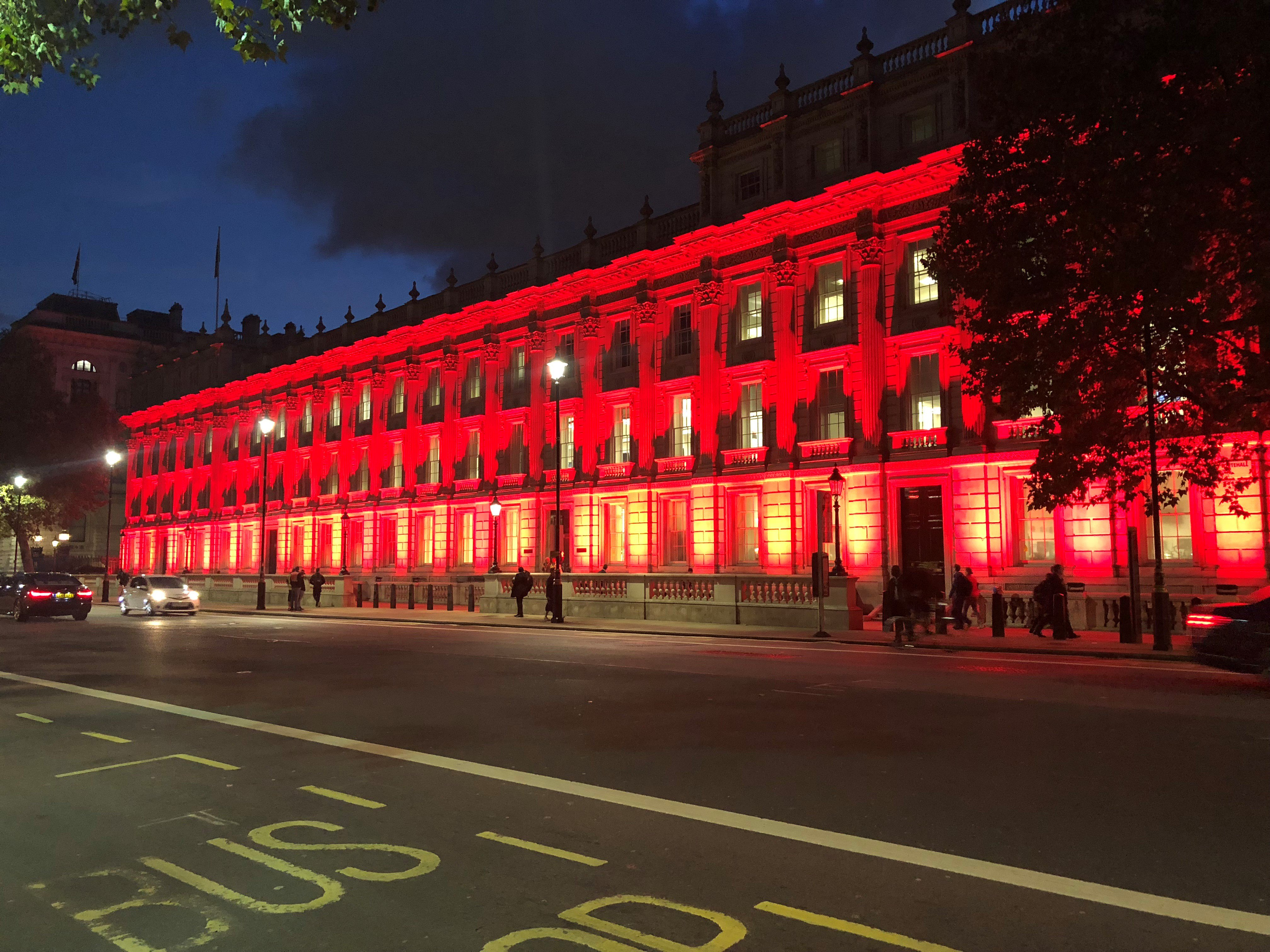
- Cabinet Office illuminated in red lighting to mark Anti-Slavery Day in 2018
- Observed by: United Kingdom
- Type: Secular
- Significance: Slavery in the 21st century in the United Kingdom
- Date: 18 October
- Next time: 18 October 2027
- Frequency: Annual
- First time: 2010
- Related to: EU Anti-Trafficking Day

Anti-Slavery Day is a commemoration in the United Kingdom held on 18 October to raise awareness about modern slavery and human trafficking.

== History ==
In 2008, the United Kingdom adopted 23 August, the UNESCO International Remembrance of the Slave Trade and its Abolition, as the national focal date for commemorating the end of the slave trade.

=== Legislation ===
Anti-Slavery Day Act 2010 (Note: Section 2(1).)
- Act of Parliament
- Parliament of the United Kingdom
- Long title: An Act to introduce a national day to raise awareness of the need to eradicate all forms of slavery, human trafficking and exploitation; and for connected purposes.
- Citation: 2010 c. 14
- Introduced by: Anthony Steen (Commons); Elizabeth Butler-Sloss, Baroness Butler-Sloss (Lords)
- Territorial extent: England and Wales (Note: Section 2(2).)

Dates
- Royal assent: 8 April 2010
- Commencement: 8 April 2010 (Note: Section 4(b) of the Interpretation Act 1978.)
Other legislation
Relates to	Anti-Slavery Day Act 2010 (Specified Date) Order 2010

Status: Current legislation

Text of statute as originally enacted

Text of the Anti-Slavery Day Act 2010 as in force today (including any amendments) within the United Kingdom, from legislation.gov.uk.

The Anti-Slavery Day Act 2010 is an act of the Parliament of the United Kingdom, which was passed to establish Anti-Slavery Day. It was introduced by the MP Anthony Steen as a private member's bill. The act describes the purpose of anti-slavery day in the following terms:

The purpose of Anti-Slavery Day shall be to—

1. acknowledge that millions of men, women and children continue to be victims of slavery, depriving them of basic human dignity and freedom;
2. raise awareness amongst young people and others of the dangers and consequences of slavery, human trafficking and exploitation and encourage them to be proactive in the fight against it;
3. draw attention to—
  1. the progress made by government and those working to combat all forms of slavery, human trafficking and exploitation, and
  2. what more needs to be done.

The act defines modern slavery as including sex trafficking, child trafficking, trafficking for forced labour, domestic servitude.

The law only extends to England and Wales, but the day has been observed in Northern Ireland and Scotland.

The law did not specify which date would be designated, but allowed the government to specify it. To coincide with the EU Anti-Trafficking Day, 18 October was chosen by the government in September 2010.

== Commemoration ==
=== Anti-Slavery Day Awards ===
The Anti-Slavery Day Awards are organised by the Human Trafficking Foundation, which was founded by Anthony Steen.

=== BBC ===
In 2018, the BBC published a series called Why Slavery? on modern sex slavery to coincide with Anti-Slavery Day.

=== Government of the United Kingdom and devolved administrations ===
The day has been observed by the government of the United Kingdom.

The day has been observed by the Scottish Government, the Welsh Government and the Northern Ireland Executive.

== Further developments ==
To coincide with Anti-Slavery Day 2012, a consultation on a draft human trafficking law was published in August 2012. The Modern Slavery Act 2015 was passed with the goal of protecting individuals who are trafficked and held against their will.
