= Martine Batchelor =

French Buddhist nun (born 1953)

Personal life
- Born: 5 June 1953 (age 73) France
- Spouse: Stephen Batchelor

Religious life
- Religion: Buddhism

Senior posting
- Teacher: Kusan Sunim
- Website: martinebatchelor.org

Martine Batchelor (born 1953), a former Jogye Buddhist nun, is the author of several books on Buddhism currently residing in France. She and her husband, Stephen Batchelor, work mostly in the United Kingdom and occasionally in the United States. In addition to writing books, she leads meditation groups with her husband that incorporate aspects of Zen, vipassanā, and Tibetan Buddhism. Batchelor also blogs frequently for the U.S.-based Tricycle: The Buddhist Review.

She studied Jogye Zen Buddhism for ten years at Songgwangsa with her former teacher Master Kusan Sunim, being ordained as a nun in 1975. Batchelor served as Kusan's interpreter on speaking tours of the United States and Europe from 1981 to 1985, the year she left monastic life, married Stephen Batchelor, and returned to Europe. There she became a member of Sharpham North Community and served as a guiding teacher at Gaia House, both of which are based in Devon, England. She has also led a Buddhist studies program at Sharpham College in Totnes, Devon. She speaks English, Korean, and French and can read Chinese characters.

== Bibliography ==
- Batchelor, Martine; Stephen Batchelor (2019). What is this? Ancient questions for modern minds. Tuwhiri. p. 176. ISBN 978-0-473-47497-3.
- Batchelor, Martine (2014). Spirit of the Buddha. Sacred Literature Series, Yale University Press. ISBN 978-0-30017-500-4.
- Batchelor, Martine (2007). Let Go: A Buddhist Guide to Breaking Free of Habits. Wisdom Publications. ISBN 978-0-86171-521-3. OCLC 80360699.
- Batchelor, Martine; Sŏnʼgyŏng Sunim (2006). Women in Korean Zen: Lives and Practices. Syracuse University Press. ISBN 0-8156-0842-X. OCLC 61694707.
- Batchelor, Martine (2004). The Path of Compassion: The Bodhisattva Precepts. Rowman Altamira. ISBN 0-7591-0517-0. OCLC 56608957.
- Batchelor, Martine (2002). Women on the Buddhist Path. Thorsons. ISBN 0-00-713319-7.
- Batchelor, Martine; Stephen Batchelor (photography) (2001). Meditation for Life. Wisdom Publications. ISBN 0-86171-302-8. OCLC 48043046.
- Batchelor, Martine (2001). Zen. HarperCollins. ISBN 0-00-711016-2.
- Batchelor, Martine (1999). Principles of Zen. Thorsons. ISBN 0-7225-3672-0. OCLC 40755254.
- Batchelor, Martine; Gill Farrer-Halls (1996). Walking on Lotus Flowers: Buddhist Women Living, Loving and Meditating. Thorsons. ISBN 0-7225-3231-8. OCLC 34886778.
- Batchelor, Martine; Kerry Brown (1992). Buddhism and Ecology. Cassell. ISBN 0-304-32375-6. OCLC 26642407.

== See also ==
- Korean Seon
- Songgwangsa
- Buddhism in Europe
- Christopher Titmuss
- Women in Buddhism
