= Human trafficking in the United Kingdom =

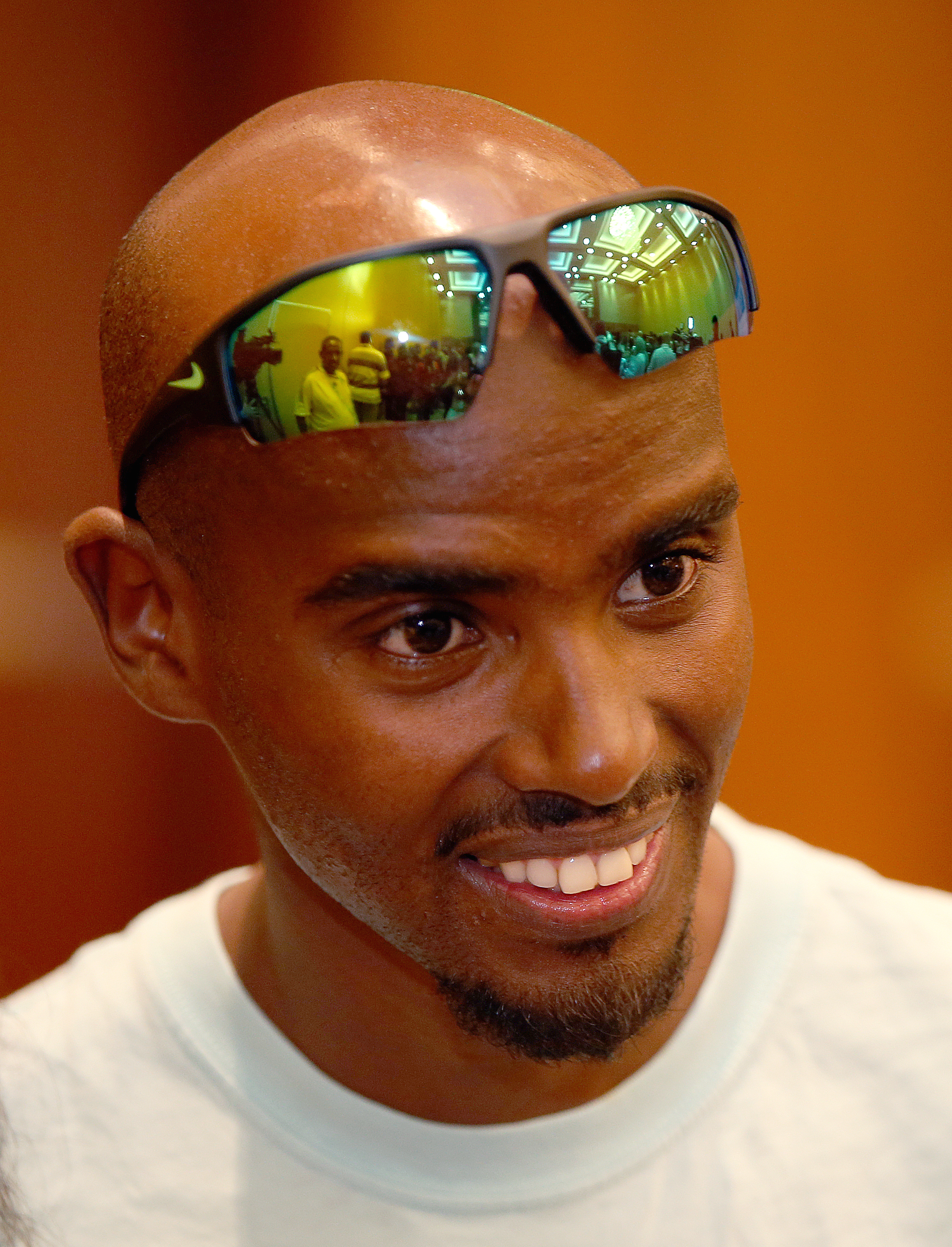
Distance runner Mo Farah was trafficked to the UK as a child.

The United Kingdom (UK) is a destination country for men, women, and children primarily from Africa, Asia, and Eastern Europe who are subjected to human trafficking for the purposes of sexual slavery and forced labour, including domestic servitude. It is also a source country since some victims, including minors from the UK, are also sex trafficked within the country. British citizens accounted for 25% (4,299) of all recorded potential victims in 2023, when they represented the most frequently referred nationality. The majority (78%; 3,350) of UK nationals were child potential victims.

Precise details about the extent of human trafficking within the UK were not available in 2009, and the validity of some of the more widely quoted figures was questionable (such as the police estimate that there were up to 4,000 trafficking victims in the United Kingdom at any one time). Since then, the United Nations estimates that approximately 136,000 people were trafficked in the UK up to 2018.

According to the National Crime Agency (NCA), human trafficking in the United Kingdom is rapidly increasing. The number of potential victims referred to the National Referral Mechanism (NRM) rose from 2,340 in 2014 to more than 10,000 in 2020. There was also an increase in convictions from 71.9% in 2019 to 73.8% in 2020. In 2020, the US State Department estimated that there were 13,000 trafficking victims in the UK.

UK nationals were the most common potential victims in 2020, accounting for 34% (3,560) of all referrals. The second most referred nationality was Albanian (15%; 1,638), followed by Vietnamese nationals (6%; 653). UK nationals were most often referred for criminal exploitation, whilst both Albanian and Vietnamese nationals were most often referred for labour and criminal exploitation. Sexual exploitation was also commonly reported for Albanian nationals.

The fall of the Soviet Union and Eastern European communism has been identified as one of the main contributing factors in increases in human trafficking from Eastern Europe. It provided both human capital and new regional opportunities to fuel the expansion. After this period, trafficking expanded, aided by the rise of organised crime, porous borders and close proximity to Western Europe, making it easier and cheaper to transport victims within the region and abroad.

Migrant workers are trafficked to the UK for forced labour in agriculture, construction, food processing, domestic servitude, and food service. Source countries for trafficking victims in the UK include the United Arab Emirates, Lithuania, Russia, Albania, Ukraine, Vietnam, Malaysia, Thailand, the People's Republic of China (P.R.C.), Nigeria, and Ghana.

The U.S. State Department's Office to Monitor and Combat Trafficking in Persons report placed the United Kingdom in "Tier 1" in 2017 and in 2023, fully compliant with The Trafficking Victims Protection Act's minimum standards for the elimination of trafficking.

UK authorities began to launch aggressive anti-trafficking law enforcement efforts to uncover trafficking and identify victims. During 2009, a six-month investigation into human trafficking by all 55 police forces of the United Kingdom failed to find a case of human trafficking. In May 2012, a cross-border operation involving police forces from Northern Ireland and the Republic of Ireland, which included the raiding of more than 130 premises, resulted in eight arrests. Three of these arrested persons were thought to be trafficking victims. It emerged that the women were not victims of human trafficking, and they were consequently charged with running a brothel. Each woman received a suspended sentence, and forfeiture orders were made for cash found at the premises during the raid. It was stressed that human trafficking did not feature in the eventual court case. Many believe that the repeated failure of large-scale police operations to find any evidence of trafficking exemplifies the inaccuracy of the human trafficking statistics often quoted by NGOs and the media, while others insist that failure to find human trafficking is merely indicative of its underground nature.

In 2023, the International Organization for Migration published a report on human trafficking between the Republic of Ireland and Northern Ireland; it noted that increasing numbers of east Africans were entering the Republic and using the Common Travel Area to travel to Northern Ireland and enter the UK, and recommended all-island training and closer information systems between the two countries.

== Definitions and characteristics ==
=== Involuntary domestic servitude ===
Involuntary domestic servitude is a form of human trafficking found in unique circumstances - informal work in a private residence - these circumstances create unique vulnerabilities for victims. Domestic workplaces are informal, connected to off-duty living quarters, and often not shared with other workers. Such an environment, which can isolate domestic workers, is conducive to exploitation because authorities cannot inspect homes as easily as they can compared to formal workplaces. Investigators and service providers report many cases of untreated illnesses and, tragically, widespread sexual abuse, which in some cases may be symptoms of a situation of involuntary servitude. Many victims live in fear of going to the authorities. They believe that they will only be recognized as illegal immigrants and punished for it. Some victims don't know that they are victims because of the isolation from the world and/or cultural or language barriers.

=== Recruiting ===
There are different forms of recruitment in the United Kingdom for trafficking. A woman in the United Kingdom might be recruited by someone who uses physical/sexual violence, deceived into coming to the UK by someone who convinces her she can study or work there, or by someone who has a position of power over her. In these power difference situations, the woman cannot refuse this persons control. It is possible for women who are physically or emotionally harmed to be easily influenced by prostitution enforcers who take control of their vulnerability. This recruitment process will most likely involve more than one person due to the travelling that some trafficked women will have to do. The recruiters could be one who recruits women, one who arranges traveling documents, and another might meet her in the United Kingdom.

As of 2018 gangs forced children to commit crimes and rough sleepers are recruited into slavery.

=== Methods ===
The UK action plan on tackling human trafficking has discovered that many victims arrive into the United Kingdom on inexpensive airlines and often into small airports where there is less security surveillance. Other methods of transportation for victims of trafficking are by train, boat, bus, car, and even on foot. There are many different routes, including the Albanian, Nigerian, Moldavian, Russian-Ukrainian, and the Eastern Mediterranean route to name a few. Children victims of trafficking have been known to enter into the UK through different airports such as London City, Stansted, and Belfast International airport. They have also been discovered to have traveled to England, Scotland, and Northern Ireland airports. Before entering into the United Kingdom, victims of trafficking generally pass through transit countries. A transit country is a country that a trafficker will pass through on the way to their final destination. Countries that have very high volumes of traffickers being transited include Albania, Bulgaria, Hungary, Italy, Poland, and Thailand. Children from China have the highest proportion of victims according to studies, and travel on different routes before reaching the United Kingdom. Some of the countries that they travel through include Russia, Bolivia, Brazil, Indonesia, and Kenya. A prominent case of human trafficking was seen within the Essex lorry deaths of 2019.

=== Control of victims ===
It is important to traffickers that their victims are cooperative when doing business. In order to keep their workers in line, traffickers have different methods of control that they practice. Some of these include drugging them, removing documentation, preventing the victims from learning the language, isolation, moving them from place to place, threatening them, and accommodating them in a way that they will become homeless if they leave. By moving victims from place to place, they are unable to become familiar with their surroundings. This keeps the victims detached from the world in a physical and mental way. With this kind of control, the victims become helpless, and have almost no chance of escaping from their traffickers.

Traffickers also stay in control of their victims with the use of intimidation, threats and violence, although in some cases victims have some freedom of movement since the traffickers have gained a psychological hold over their victims. Examples of control methods include: threats of intimidation/violence, threat to inflict violence upon their families at home, threat to inform victims family of their involvement in prostitution, removal of documentation, debt bondage, ritual oaths, drugs and alcohol, curtailment of freedom and movement, consistent change of location, fear of authorities, isolation, threats of deportation and some victims simply don't recognise they are a victim of human trafficking.

== Benefits for traffickers ==
Usually traffickers know the risk that they are taking when entering into this business, but continue to do so because of the benefits that they receive. The maximum jail sentence for a human trafficking violation is 14 years, but this amount of time is usually not threatening to traffickers because of their financial benefits. In this business, the amount of money that can be made is far beyond a day job, and can be made through many different routes. The money that a trafficker can make off of selling one victim in the United Kingdom can range from £500 to £8,000. The amount of money that traffickers make per day is also a huge benefit to continue their business. Per day in the United Kingdom, a trafficker can make between £150 and £1,000. Usually the traffickers pay their prostitutes little to nothing for their services and keep the profits for themselves. Another way that traffickers make money is by paying for their victims travel charges and demanding the money back once they arrive in the United Kingdom.

=== Cost and revenue of a human trafficker ===
In 2012, a report showed that most victims being trafficked into the United Kingdom were from China, Vietnam and Eastern Europe. According to Rosa Silverman, the revenue generated by one sex worker was estimated to be £48,000, therefore, the market is worth tens of millions of pounds in 2013. The costs of travel and obtaining fake documentation can be very costly. This can range from £500 to £12,000 for fake documentation and £2,000 to £3,000 for travel from Europe. If the victim is travelling from a farther location, the cost of travel can be much more. Studies show that the travel cost from China is between £25,000 and £50,000 for one victim. The methods of transportation can also have an effect on the cost of travel. Some traffickers purchase their victims, which can become very costly to their business. Depending on different factors including race, location, and age of the victim, the cost can vary. One trafficker reported to have paid as little as £800 for a girl from South Africa, but another paid £20,000 for a different girl. In 2012, the reported sales value of a victim in the United Kingdom was usually between £3000 and £4000.

== Prosecution ==
The British government continued its proactive law enforcement efforts to combat trafficking. The UK prohibited all forms of trafficking through the Sexual Offences Act 2003 (in England, Wales and Northern Ireland), the Criminal Justice (Scotland) Act 2003 (in Scotland), and the Asylum and Immigration (Treatment of Claimants, etc.) Act 2004. These prescribed penalties of a maximum of 14 years' imprisonment, although the specific punishments prescribed for sex trafficking are less severe than those prescribed for rape. Existing offences relating to trafficking and slavery were consolidated in England and Wales by the Modern Slavery Act 2015, which became law in March 2015; in Scotland by the Human Trafficking and Exploitation (Scotland) Act 2015, which became law in November 2015; and in Northern Ireland by the Human Trafficking and Exploitation (Criminal Justice and Support for Victims) Act (Northern Ireland) 2015, which became law in January 2015. Less comprehensive offences that would be called trafficking today have existed at least since the Slave Trade Act 1824.

In 2007, the UK government launched Pentameter II, a large-scale operation aimed at rescuing victims, disrupting trafficking networks, developing intelligence, and raising public awareness. A study conducted by the government in 2007 identified a minimum of 330 individual cases of children trafficked into the UK and, the same year, the government reported prosecutions involving at least 52 suspected trafficking offenders. Although the government reported 75 ongoing prosecutions during the previous reporting period, it convicted only ten trafficking offenders in 2007, a significant decrease from 28 convictions obtained in 2006. Sentences imposed on convicted trafficking offenders in 2007 ranged from 20 months' to 10 years' imprisonment, with an average sentence of four years. In one case in 2008 in the UK, girls were trafficked for forced prostitution and a man was sentenced to 10 years in prison In January 2008, police arrested 25 members of Romanian organized crime organizations from the Roma ethnic minority using Roma children, including a baby less than a year old, as pickpockets and in begging schemes. The Rochdale sex trafficking gang, a group of paedophiles who preyed on under-age girls in Rochdale, were the first people in Britain to be convicted of sex trafficking, on 8 May 2012.

== Protection ==
A system that is currently in place for helping trafficked people is the National Referral Mechanism (NRM). In order to protect trafficked people, a first responder must refer the person to the NRM. A first responder might include the National Health Service or local authorities. In these cases, the victim has to consent to being referred, and it is preferred that it is done within 48 hours of contact with the victim. The referral is sent to the Competent Authority which is the program that will decide whether or not a person is being trafficked. The Competent Authority will analyze the referral form and make a decision within 5 business days. If the victim is believed to be trafficked, the Competent Authority will grant the victim a 30-day recovery and reflection period. This would involve being in a safe environment with medical and other kinds of help. Before the end of the 30-day period, the Competent Authority will make a 'conclusive decision' about whether or not the victim was one of trafficking. These results might depend on evidence that is recovered during the 30-day period. If a person is found to be a victim of trafficking, a decision might be made to extend their recovery period, or to grant them a residence permit. If they receive a negative conclusive decision, the Competent Authority can review the decision. This later decision can be further challenged by judicial review.

=== Compensation ===
The Criminal Injuries Compensation Scheme 2009 is the program in charge of allowing victims to be compensated for the injuries they have received while being trafficked. The Criminal Injuries Compensation Scheme 2009 is run by the Criminal Injuries Compensation Authority (CICA). To be eligible for compensation, a victim must report their treatment within two years of escaping.

== Prevention ==
=== National Vigilance Association (NVA) ===
The National Vigilance Association was created at a meeting located in London in 1885. This is an example of a past association that took on the challenge of trying to diminish human trafficking. The purpose of this association was to be the main agency for undertaking private prosecutions for human trafficking and alert police of those that committed offences against the Criminal Law Amendment Act 1885. This Act included an offence of holding a woman under 21 as a prostitute, increasing the age of consent to 16 years, criminalising homosexual acts even in private, and fines for acts of prostitution. These acts allowed for women to be isolated in military stations across England and Ireland if they were believed to be involved in forms of prostitution. By 1888, the NVA had 300 affiliated groups that were engaged in local, national and international levels. By 1977, the NVA was unable to continue due to financial difficulties. The prosecutions that they performed became costly and the NVA began to lose control of their original duties. They were forced to change their focus or end their branches completely. By the middle of the 20th century, the remaining NVA in Scotland was redesigned to become a casework agency. The NVA helped to change the relationship between the individual and the state by allowing the state to have a right to intervene in inappropriate sexual behaviour, where in the past, sexual behaviour was always considered a private matter for the individual.

=== International laws ===
The two most recent attempts at defining, preventing and prosecuting human trafficking on the level of international law are the United Nations Convention Against Transnational Organized Crime and the United Nations Protocol Against the Smuggling of Migrants by Land, Sea and Air. These were created by the United Nations Office on Drugs and Crime (UNODC). According to Lindsey King, the standard for how a trafficked victim should be treated is explained in two international agendas, "Human Rights Standards for the Treatment of Trafficking Persons" and "Recommended Principles and Guidelines on Human Rights and Human Trafficking".

==== Issues when enforcing international law ====
There are issues that occur when trying to enforce international laws. Victims of trafficking are usually very hesitant to admit their situations because they fear the consequences. Another problem that occurs when trying to enforce international law is the lack of training that enforcement has in each state. It is usually not likely that each officer in a state is properly trained with the knowledge and skills needed in order to handle trafficking victims. In order to provide a solution, the awareness of these officers and officials is crucial. Particularly, health service, social workers, building inspectors and health and safety inspectors need to be properly informed of how to recognize different indicators of forced labor and prostitution. The training of immigration judges is also crucial when identifying females that are being trafficked. The United Kingdom Human Trafficking Centre (UKHTC) has put 12 training seminars in place since 2008, which includes trafficking in the UK now, laws on human trafficking and identification of victims. The language barrier is another issue that arises when women are passed across international borders.

=== Risk assessment ===
Government policy relies on a robust approach to risk assessment to help ensure that modern slavery and human trafficking are eliminated as far as possible within government commercial operations and supply chains.

== In Scotland ==
Scottish cities with the highest incidence of trafficking include Glasgow, Stirling, Edinburgh, Dundee and Aberdeen. According to studies, the individuals’ experiences were varied. Most of the individuals claimed that they knew that they were being trafficked and were content with their situation. But others were deceived into the work that they would be doing. They were generally introduced to individuals who offered them a job in Scotland and were exploited into sex trafficking once they arrived. The victims were discovered in private flats and houses that were being used to house traffickers. These kinds of locations are used because they do not have a high risk of detection. The main trafficking route into Scotland has been discovered to be from London and the victims are usually escorted by someone connected with their trafficking organization. Other routes into Scotland included Northern Ireland, western Scotland and Dublin. The immigrant population has grown in recent years in Scotland, which can be connected to the increase in trafficking in Scotland. Glasgow, which is one of the largest trafficking locations in Scotland, has over 77 nationalities living there. Many of the victims nationalities are unknown in Scotland, but those that are known are generally from Asian and African countries.

== See also ==
- Huddersfield sex abuse ring
- Banbury child sex abuse ring
- Rochdale child sex abuse ring
- Telford child sexual exploitation scandal
- Rotherham child sexual exploitation scandal
- Child sexual abuse in the United Kingdom
- Parents Against Child Exploitation
- Human Trafficking Foundation
- Sophie Hayes
- Slavery in Britain § Modern slavery
