= Sophie Hayes =

Alias name of a British woman, who was a victim of human trafficking

Sophie Hayes is the alias of a British woman who was a victim of human trafficking and became a writer, campaigner and the founder of the Sophie Hayes Foundation.

== Victim of trafficking ==
Sophie Hayes is believed to be the first British female who was trafficked outside the UK. She was lured to Italy where she was forced by her best friend to work as a prostitute for six months. She was 24 years at that time. She experienced severe violence and threats from her pimp, who she believed was her best friend and became her boyfriend, as well as from customers and other prostitutes.

== Publications ==
Trafficked: My Story is the title of her book, published in 2012 by HarperCollins, in which she describes her experiences as a victim of trafficking and her work as a prostitute in Italy and France. The book was a Sunday Times bestseller for six months after publication.

== Campaigning ==
=== Stop the Traffik ===
Hayes campaigned for a British charity, Stop the Traffik, and delivered a campaign petition on trafficking to the United Nations.

=== Sophie Hayes Foundation ===
She set up her own charity in 2012. The charity, which supports survivors of human trafficking by offering skills and confidence building as well as employability programmes, also does research and awareness raising.

== See also ==
- Human trafficking in the United Kingdom
- Human trafficking in Italy
