= Modern Slavery Act 2015 =

Act of the Parliament of the United Kingdom

Modern Slavery Act 2015 (Note: Section 62.)
- Act of Parliament
- Parliament of the United Kingdom
- Long title: An Act to make provision about slavery, servitude and forced or compulsory labour and about human trafficking, including provision for the protection of victims; to make provision for an Independent Anti-slavery Commissioner; and for connected purposes.
- Citation: 2015 c. 30
- Introduced by: Theresa May MP, Home Secretary (Commons); Lord Bates (Lords)
- Territorial extent: England and Wales; Scotland (in part); Northern Ireland (in part); (Note: Section 60.)

Dates
- Royal assent: 26 March 2015
- Commencement: Various (Note: Section 61.)
Other legislation
Amends	Administration of Justice Act 1970; Children and Young Persons Act 1933; Immigration Act 1971; House of Commons Disqualification Act 1975; Criminal Justice Act 1991; Sexual Offences (Amendment) Act 1992; Social Security (Recovery of Benefits) Act 1997; Youth Justice and Criminal Evidence Act 1999; Powers of Criminal Courts (Sentencing) Act 2000; Proceeds of Crime Act 2002; Nationality, Immigration and Asylum Act 2002; Courts Act 2003; Sexual Offences Act 2003; Criminal Justice Act 2003; Health and Social Care (Community Health and Standards) Act 2003; Criminal Justice (Scotland) Act 2003; Asylum and Immigration (Treatment of Claimants, etc.) Act 2004; Serious Crime Act 2007; Coroners and Justice Act 2009; Criminal Justice and Licensing (Scotland) Act 2010; Protection of Freedoms Act 2012; Legal Aid, Sentencing and Punishment of Offenders Act 2012; Prevention of Social Housing Fraud Act 2013
Amended by	Immigration Act 2016; Modern Slavery Act 2015 (Consequential Amendments) Regulations 2016; Human Trafficking and Exploitation (Scotland) Act 2015 (Consequential Provisions and Modifications) Order 2016; Modern Slavery Act 2015 (Duty to Co-operate with Commissioner) Regulations 2016; Data Protection Act 2018; Sentencing Act 2020; Nationality and Borders Act 2022; Health and Social Care Act (Northern Ireland) 2022; Criminal Justice Act 2003 (Commencement No. 33) and Sentencing Act 2020 (Commencement No. 2) Regulations 2022; Health and Social Care Act (Northern Ireland) 2022 (Consequential Amendments) Order 2022; National Security Act 2023; Online Safety Act 2023; Judicial Review and Courts Act 2022 (Magistrates’ Court Sentencing Powers) Regulations 2023; Employment Rights Act 2025
Relates to	Human Trafficking and Exploitation (Scotland) Act 2015; Human Trafficking and Exploitation (Criminal Justice and Support for Victims) Act (Northern Ireland) 2015

Status: Amended

History of passage through Parliament

Text of statute as originally enacted

Revised text of statute as amended

The Modern Slavery Act 2015 (c. 30) is an act of the Parliament of the United Kingdom. It is designed to combat modern slavery in the UK and consolidates previous offences relating to trafficking and slavery. The act extends essentially to England and Wales, but some provisions (for example, relating to modern slavery statements and cross-border pursuit) apply in Scotland and Northern Ireland.

The bill was introduced to the House of Commons in draft form in October 2013 by James Brokenshire, Parliamentary Under Secretary for Crime and Security. The bill's sponsors in the Home Office were Theresa May and Lord Bates. It received Royal Assent and became law on 26 March 2015.

James Brokenshire was quoted as saying that the act would "send the strongest possible message to criminals that if you are involved in this disgusting trade in human beings, you will be arrested, you will be prosecuted and you will be locked up".

== Provisions ==
The act contains a number of provisions:

- The consolidation of the existing slavery and trafficking offences
- The introduction of two new civil orders to enable the courts to place restrictions on those convicted of modern slavery offences, or those involved in such offences but not yet convicted
- The establishment of an Independent Anti-Slavery Commissioner to encourage good practice on the prevention of modern slavery offences and the identification of victims. (Part IV of the Act.) The first commissioner was Kevin Hyland.
- The provision of mechanisms for seizing traffickers’ assets and channelling some of that money towards victims for compensation payments
- The creation of a new statutory defence for slavery or trafficking victims compelled to commit criminal offences (section 45) as well as the extension of special measures for witnesses testifying in criminal trials to those who have been victims of modern slavery (section 46)
- The provision of child trafficking advocates (section 48)

The provision in section 45 which gives a statutory defence to criminal prosecution for slavery or trafficking victim is not available in a number of more serious offences set out in Schedule 4. If it comes to light after conviction, it is possible for the Court of Appeal to quash a conviction of a defendant who has been the victim of trafficking.

== Amendments to the bill ==
=== Supply chain ===
The draft bill included no measures to counter the use of slave labour abroad as the Home Office believed that asking businesses to audit and report on modern slavery in their supply chains would be an "additional burden". However, campaigning resulted in a supply chain clause being added to the bills so that "big business will be forced to make public its efforts to stop the use of slave labour by its suppliers". Consultation regarding the reporting requirements of the supply chain clause took place during February and March 2015.

From 29 October 2015 the Transparency in Supply Chain Provisions require businesses to publish an annual statement if they have an annual turnover above a threshold (£36 million). The statement must confirm the steps taken to ensure that slavery and human trafficking are not taking place in the business (or in any supply chain) or declare that no steps to confirm the existence of slavery or trafficking have been taken. It is expected that few businesses would take the latter option as it may place their ethical position into question and affect their reputation. There are, however, no legally binding requirements to conduct due diligence on supply chains and there are no criminal or financial penalties for non-compliance.

On 21 March 2016 the Home Office held a Transparency in Supply Chains (TISC) event where an independent civil society modern slavery register, the TISC Report, was announced in order to provide a publicly searchable, accessible registry for companies to share their statements. At the point of launch, on 1 April 2016, the organization, which was founded by Jaya Chakrabarti, was partnered with, amongst others, the Welsh Government, the Chartered Institute of Procurement & Supply, the International Chamber of Commerce (ICC), and Business West. On 31 January 2017 it had 10,153 companies with statements held within its open data register, making it the largest modern slavery statement register globally. As of June 2025 the register reports that its database includes over 60,000 modern slavery statements.

In 2019 the UK Government committed on a voluntary basis to publishing a Modern Slavery Statement of its own, reflecting the requirements imposed on larger businesses under section 54 of the 2015 Act. The statement was published on 26 March 2020. An updated statement was issued in September 2023. The Welsh Government published a Modern Slavery Statement on 10 August 2023. Scotland's first Trafficking and Exploitation Strategy was published in 2017 and the Scottish Government published a statement covering "slavery and human trafficking" on 12 December 2023.

=== Prostitution ===
In November 2014 Fiona Mactaggart MP added an amendment to the bill concerning prostitution, aimed at criminalising the purchase of sex. In the bill's debate in the House of Commons, John McDonnell MP argued against the amendment. He highlighted the lack of evidence for any correlation between the Swedish sex purchase ban and a reduction in numbers of sex workers or their clients, and cited findings "that not only do such measures not work, they actually cause harm". McDonnell quoted Reverend Andrew Dotchin, a founding member of the Safety First Coalition: "I strongly oppose clauses on prostitution in the Modern Slavery Bill, which would make the purchase of sex illegal. Criminalising clients does not stop prostitution, nor does it stop the criminalisation of women. It drives prostitution further underground, making it more dangerous and stigmatising for women." The amendment was subsequently dropped.

=== Tied visas ===
In March 2015 an amendment was brought forward in the House of Lords concerning migrant workers who are brought to the UK by their employer using "tied visas". These workers are typically foreign domestic workers and they are not allowed to legally leave their job and find employment elsewhere. The system of tied visas, introduced in 2012, has been compared to the kafala system of employer-sponsored workers used in some Middle East countries. The amendment would have given workers in the UK using tied visas the right to change employer, but it was rejected by the House of Commons.

== Criticism of the bill ==
Experts in the issue were sceptical of the bill, believing that it had many shortcomings. Parosha Chandran, a human rights barrister and United Nations expert on trafficking, claimed that "the bill is very poor on victim protection". Anthony Steen, who advised on the legislation and chairs the Human Trafficking Foundation, claimed that the bill failed to focus on the needs of victims of trafficking in the UK. "The bill is wholly and exclusively about law enforcement – but it shouldn’t be enforcement-based, it should be victim-based", he said.

Human rights group Liberty argued that the bill should have:

- Addressed abuses associated with the Domestic Overseas Worker Visa which prohibits individuals from changing their employer
- Addressed the conflict of interest arising from UK Visas and Immigration being involved with the National Referral Mechanism which is used to identify trafficking victims and which acts as a gateway to support
- Extended legal aid to slavery victims in civil matters

== Implementation of the act ==
One of the aims of the Home Affairs Select Committee's inquiry into prostitution legislation, which began in January 2016, was to examine the impact that the act had had on trafficking for the purposes of prostitution and whether further measures were needed to help those involved in prostitution to leave it. Submissions to the inquiry published in June 2016 said that there had been 1,139 victims of trafficking for sexual exploitation in 2014.

A review of the act in 2016 found that 289 offences were prosecuted under the act in 2015, and that there had been a 40% rise in the number of victims referred for support. In July 2016 the Anti-Slavery Commissioner suggested that the number of crimes being reported and investigated under the act was falling short of the real number of cases of human trafficking and modern slavery. In the same month prime minister Theresa May announced additional measures to assist the implementation of the act:

- The creation of a task force to coordinate government action
- A budget allocation of £33.5 million
- An assessment of consistency in police approach by Her Majesty's Inspectorate of Constabulary

In 2017, figures published by the National Crime Agency indicated that there were over 300 current police operations investigating possible violations of the act, and that a total of 3,805 people had been reported as potential victims in 2016. In September 2017 alone, nine people were jailed for offences under the act.

In January 2024 a select committee of the House of Lords was appointed to consider the Act's implementation, impact, effectiveness, how it has been affected by subsequent political developments and whether it requires improvement. The committee published its report in October 2024. It concluded that, while the act had been effective at the time it came into force, changing circumstances meant that it needed updating. It highlighted difficulties rising from subsequent changes to immigration law, proposing that addressing trafficking should be a part of immigration policy. It noted that the fragmentation of the labour market had made preventing modern slavery more difficult, and proposed the creation of a specialist enforcement body. It also expressed concern that supply chain transparency was no longer sufficient, and should be replaced with a requirement of due diligence for companies to remove modern slavery from their supply chains.

== Scholarly debate/research findings ==
Some studies offer critical insights into the UK Modern Slavery Act. A study conducted a comprehensive analysis of section 54 of the Act through interviews with anti-slavery activists and experts, alongside a review of media articles, NGO reports, and existing regulations, revealing several critical issues regarding the Act's effectiveness in the context of global supply chains. The study noted that the Act's call for supply chain transparency is disclosure-focused and limited, leaving many organisations, particularly those with annual turnover below £36 million, exempt and seemingly indifferent to human rights abuse. The Act lacks provisions for companies to disclose factory locations and conditions, and enforcement of its supply chain reporting requirements is limited, resulting in minimal legal recourse for holding them accountable for slavery and exploitation in factories located in the Global South. However, failure to publish a modern slavery statement can lead to an injunction requiring compliance; breaching that injunction can attract an unlimited fine. There are no requirements for third-party audits or verification of overseas working conditions, and the Act prioritize corporate interests over the protection of vulnerable workers, with the Act's risk management provisions focusing more on business risks than on the risks of workers being victims of slavery within the UK’s global chain. Some studies documented workers’ vulnerability, exploitation, human rights abuses and forced labour during the COVID-19 pandemic in garment factories in countries such as Bangladesh supplying UK retailers, exposing the limitations of the Act in curbing slavery and exploitation within global supply chains

== In other countries ==
By 2018 legislation intended to reduce the impact of modern slavery on supply chains had been passed by seven of the G20 countries (including the UK). In 2018 the Government of Australia introduced a Modern Slavery Bill to the Parliament of Australia, using the United Kingdom’s Modern Slavery Act 2015 as a model. The bill was introduced following an Inquiry instigated, led and undertaken by the Foreign Affairs & Aid Sub-Committee of the Joint Standing Committee on Foreign Affairs, Defence and Trade, chaired by then Australian MP Chris Crewther. The Sub-Committee through its Inquiry looked into whether Australia should adopt a comparable Modern Slavery Act, gave in-principle support for the proposal in its August 2017 Interim Report, and gave full support through the recommendations of its final report, "Hidden in Plain Sight", in December 2017.

It was passed into law as the Modern Slavery Act 2018 in November 2018, with effect from 1 January 2019. The reporting threshold is annual revenue above A$100 million (equivalent to about US$70 million or £55 million), with strengths beyond the original UK Act including a legislated government-run central repository of statements, mandatory prescribed criteria for statements, government being required to report, a legislated three year review, and some compliance measures enabling the listing of entities who do not report, or do not report properly, by the Minister.

== See also ==
- Human trafficking in the United Kingdom
- Migrant domestic workers
- Ethical trade
- Operation Netwing
