= Ethical trade =

Socially responsible sourcing and trade of goods

The term ethical trade first gained currency in the mid-1990s, where it was used as a term for socially responsible sourcing. Ethical trade addresses the ethical aspects of organisations including worker welfare, agricultural practice, natural resource conservation, and sustainability of the environment. Since then, numerous multinational organisations have adopted ethical trade policies by outsourcing to auditing companies to monitor the conditions of workers in their supply chains. The leading alliance of these companies, trade unions and non-governmental organisations is the Ethical Trading Initiative. to support business

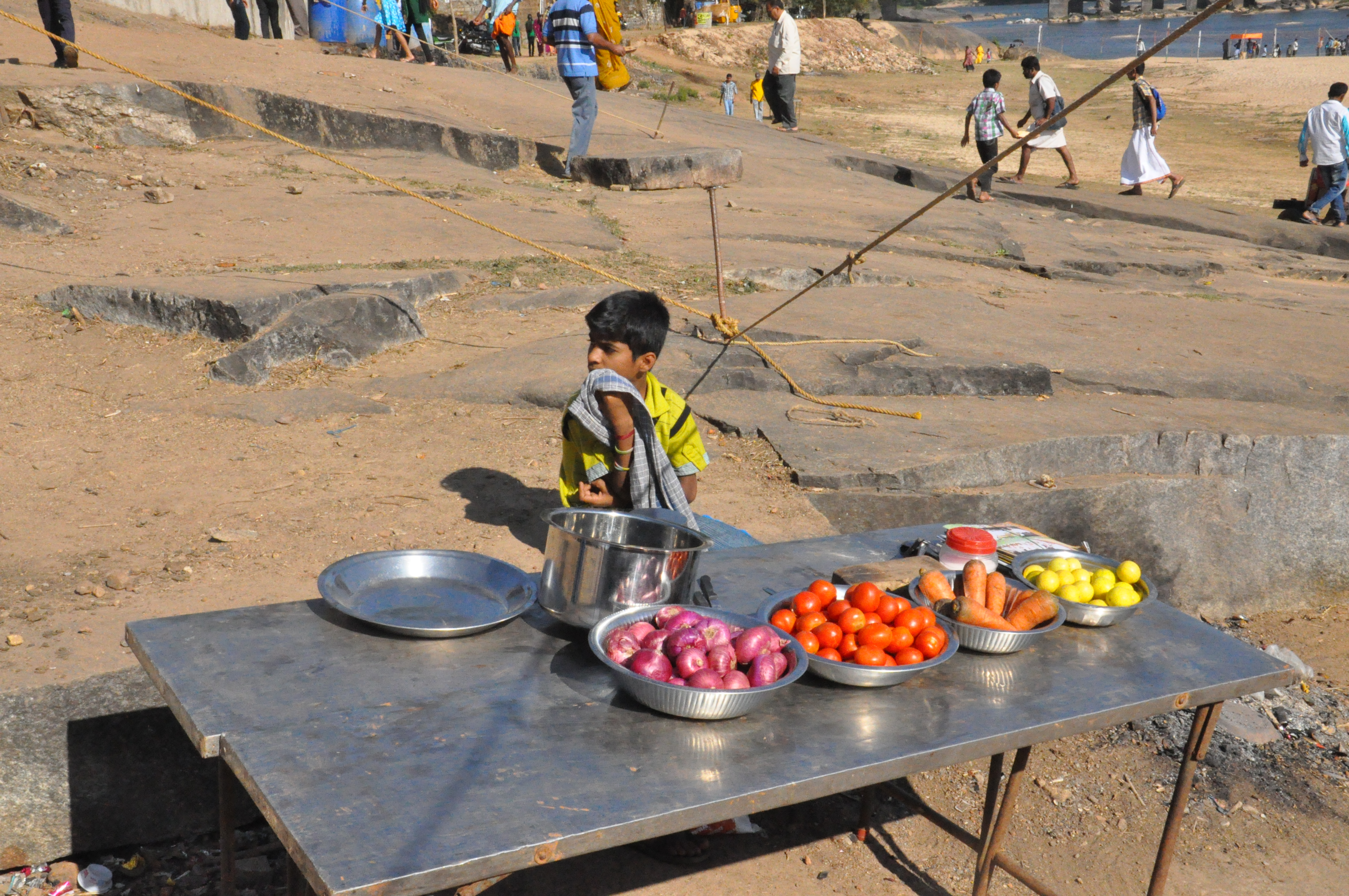
In many areas of India, child labour still prevails

== Ethical Trading Initiative ==
Ethical Trading Initiative (ETI) is a UK-based organisation that reaches out to 9.8 million workers per year. Since their inception in 1998, they have supported ethical trade in global supply chains by introducing legal protection for 600,000 migrant workers in the UK, aided movements for the increase of real wages in parts of Bangladesh, and contributed to more than 133,000 improvements to the welfare of workers worldwide. ETI are committed to implementing ethical trade by enforcing corporates to implement the ETI base code in their supply chains. The ETI base code reflects the commitment to ethical trade by stipulating the need for freely chosen employment, freedom of association, safe working conditions, and reasonable working hours.

== UN Guiding Principles on Business and Human Rights ==
In 2011, the UN Human Rights Council endorsed a set of principles known as the UN Guiding Principles on Business and Human Rights in an attempt to address the issue of human rights in businesses. The principles were proposed by Professor John Ruggie from Harvard University after six years of research. They are based on 47 consultations and site visits in more than 20 countries, and involve governments, companies, business associations, civil society, and investors. They have been considered "an authoritative global reference point for business and human rights" by Oxfam and implement ethical trade by ensuring that governments and companies have a collective responsibility to protect human rights in business enterprises.

== International Labour Organization ==
The International Labour Organization (ILO) is a specialised agency of the United Nations dedicated to improving the standards of living of workers throughout the world. Established in 1919, the ILO have made significant contributions in addressing issues such as excessive working hours, unemployment, minimum age, and work for women. The tripartite structure of the ILO is unique in that it ensures employees and workers have an equal voice alongside governments in terms of addressing ILO's policies and programs. They aim to adopt international labour standards in member states regarding the ethical aspects of business practices, including the abolition of forced labour, workplace discrimination, and the protection of migrant workers.

== Current affairs ==
=== Cambodia ===
On 17 September 2014, over 500 textile workers rallied for an increase in minimum wages in the industrial suburb of Phnom Penh, Cambodia. The frequent protests regarding the poor working conditions and decline in real wages have become a critical issue for the Cambodian Prime Minister, as the prolonged strikes could result in reduced orders from retail firms such as Gap Inc, Nike and H & M that outsource to Cambodian factories. Recent findings gathered from workers indicate that over 33% of garment workers are medically underweight, earning around £51 per month as minimum wage, and subjected to the conditions of modern-day slavery. The general secretary of the Trades Union Congress, Frances O'Grady, stated that "European-based corporations have a responsibility to ensure that workers' rights are respected in their supply chains." Hence outlining the need for ethical trade practices.

=== Canada ===
The death of a temporary foreign worker, Ivan Guerrero, on a farm in Quebec once again raised questions about the working conditions of migrants. Gurrerro expressed the hardships he faced through a video he recorded in 2013 with Somos Hermanos, a group dedicated to improving the conditions of migrant workers. In the video Guerrero makes reference to excessive working hours, unpaid overtime, and lack of freedom. In response to the complaint, Guerrero's employer declined a formal interview. Instead stating that "they were hired to work and not to party" and that he did not call the police as he failed to realise Guerrero was missing.

=== UK ===
The number of cases of human trafficking involving forced labour has increased to 42% in England and Wales, a 2011 study from The Salvation Army reported. According to Karen Bradley, the minister for modern slavery and organised crime, "there are more people in slavery today than at any other time in human history." Over 80% of the cases of forced labour involved men, with the majority of victims contacting the charity from parts of Eastern Europe. Bradley said the move towards eliminating modern slavery would include a modern slavery bill going to Parliament, placing a weighty responsibility on large companies to ensure that their supply chains are free from slavery.

== Criticism ==
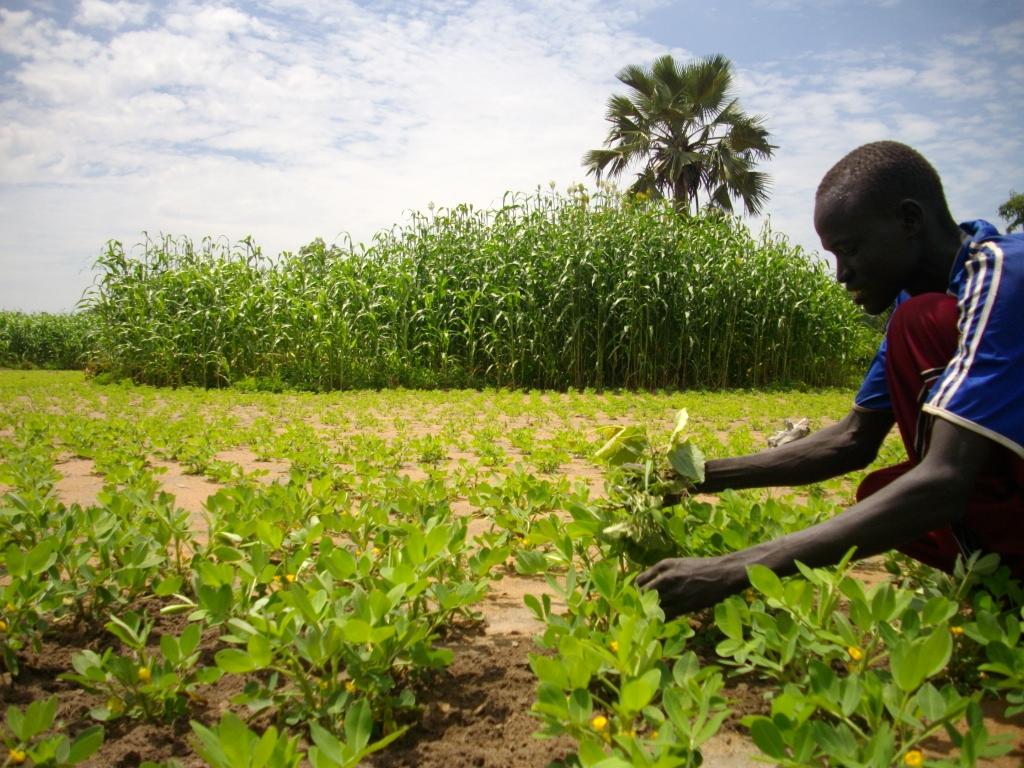
Oxfam supports small-scale farmers by providing a variety of seeds, tools and equipment to help increase the amount and quality of crops they are able to grow

In 2006, findings published by the Institute of Development Studies at Sussex University showed that the ETI base code, signed by some of Britain's leading companies, failed to prevent the exploitation of workers in their supply chains. British and foreign workers employed by companies such as Marks & Spencer, Tesco, Gap Inc. and Sainsbury's were treated harshly by their employees, remained on low incomes, and had no union representation. The authors of the study stated that "in general codes had almost no impact in terms of ensuring workers receive a living wage" and urged British retailers to "take responsibility for ensuring prices paid to suppliers are sufficient to cover labour costs based on a living wage." Therefore, raising questions on whether ethical trade has had any impact on the conditions of workers in disadvantaged areas.

However, the Institute of Development Studies also concluded that there have been some major improvements for workers. Neil Kearney, General Secretary of the International, Textile, Garment and Leather Workers’ Federation, stated that progress had been made "particularly with regard to the issues of health and safety and child labour." In Vietnam, local communities have benefited from improvements to health and safety as well as reductions in working hours. Improvements have also been made particularly in regards to fire safety, medical services, and infrastructure. In South Africa two farms implemented a policy on ethical treatment due to the ETI base code, but major improvements are still yet to be made in regards to child labour, trade unions, and communication between farms and organisations.

== See also ==
- Ethical Consumerism
- Fair trade
- Fairtrade certification
