= MARA: A Chamber Opera on Good and Evil =

MĀRA: A Chamber Opera on Good and Evil is an American chamber opera in two acts composed by Sherry Woods to a libretto by Stephen Batchelor. The opera humanizes the story of Siddhattha Gotama (the Buddha) and his encounters with Māra, Taṇhā (Māra's daughter), and the demonic figures that appear to him as he seeks a way to live an awakened life in the world.

MĀRA received a workshop performance in the Black Box Theatre of Francis Marion University Performing Arts Center (Florence, South Carolina) on October 28, 2016. Benjamin Woods was the Music Director, and Ronn Smith was the Producer/Stage Director. Chris Woods sang the role of Gotama, Paul Thompson sang Māra, and Lauren Smith Woods sang Taṇhā and Ānanda. The orchestra included Betsy Johnson (flute), Amy Herin (violin), Mary Louise Nagata (viola 1), Neil Dey (Viola 2), Adrienne Woods (Cello 1), Preston Watson (Cello 2), and Forrest Matthews (Bass). Carol Sherry designed the costumes, and Alexander Melton designed the lighting.

An expanded version of the opera was presented in a concert version at The Rubin Museum of Art, in New York City, on October 18 and 20, 2017. Michael Sumuel sang the role of Gotama, Sam Levine sang Māra (Sunakkhatta and Cunda), and Rebecca Farley sang Taṇhā and Ānanda. The orchestra included John Romeri (flute), Erin Benim (violin), Kiku Enomoto (Viola 1), Katie Kresek (Viola 2), Adrienne Woods (Cello 1), Eleanor Norton (Cello 2), and Mat Fieldes (Bass). The libretto, including essays by Stephen Batchelor, Sherry Woods, and Ronn Smith, was printed in a private edition.

== Composition history ==
Stephen Batchelor's text is drawn entirely from material in the Pali Canon. Act 1, which tells of Gotama's renunciation and the conquest of Māra, is based on the following sources: Ariyapariyesana Sutta (MN.26), Saḷāyatana Saṃyutta (SN.35:13), Sutta Nipāta (Sn.406, 425–49), and Māra Saṃyutta (SN.4, passim). Act 2, which recounts the story of the last weeks of Gotama's life, is based on the following: Mahāparinibbāna Sutta (DN.16) and Theragāthā (Thag.1034–6).

The figure of Māra is explored at length in Batchelor's book Living with the Devil: A Meditation on Good and Evil (New York: Riverhead, 2004). For an understanding of Venerable Mahākassapa (act 2, scene 4), see Batchelor's After Buddhism: Rethinking the Dharma for a Secular Age, chapter 10 (New Haven: Yale University Press, 2015).

== Music ==
Composed by Sherry Woods, the music for MĀRA: A Chamber Opera on Good and Evil is written in a tonal style inspired by Western composers from as early as Hildegard of Bingen and as recent as the 21st century. The 60-minute opera, written for three singers and a seven-piece chamber orchestra, includes chorales, operatic ensembles, imitative counterpoint, funeral marches, and Western dance forms, such as a tango, waltzes, and a tarantella. Parallel to Batchelor's own process of bringing a contemporary examination to ancient texts, Woods has chosen to interpret this ancient story from the India of 2600 years ago within her own contemporary musical training and Western sensibilities.

The score is infused with musical references to composers who wrote of death, the devil, temptation, and betrayal. In act 1, scene 1, for example, Gotama riffs on the first cello's melodic line from Hildegard of Bingen's Ordo Virtutum, a morality play in which the Devil has a speaking part but does not sing. Other references include the famous ground bass from Henry Purcell's "Dido's Lament", the foreboding Latin hymn "Dies Irae" (Day of Wrath), and an inverted melody from Bizet's Carmen.

== Roles ==
MĀRA: A Chamber Opera on Good and Evil includes four main characters: Gotama, Māra, Taṇhā, and Ānanda. The libretto was written with three performers in mind: two male and one female. Gotama and Māra appear in both acts. Taṇhā appears in act 1; Ānanda in act 2.

- Gotama (bass-baritone): The Buddha-to-be (act 1, scenes 1 and 2) and the Buddha (act 1, scene 3, and act 2 throughout).
- Māra (tenor): The Devil, whom Gotama must conquer to become the Buddha. Māra also appears as Gotama's father (act 1, scene 1), Sunakkhatta (act 2, scene 1), Cunda the Smith (act 2, scene 5), and Mahākassapa (act 2, scene 6). To suggest how the demonic is built into the fabric of existence, Māra is present in every scene, even when he has no singing role.
- Taṇhā (soprano): Māra's daughter; her name means "Craving". She also appears as Gotama's mother (act 1, scene 1).
- Ānanda (soprano): Gotama's nephew and student; the Buddha's faithful attendant for the last 25 years of his life (act 2, scenes 2-6).

== Synopsis ==
=== Act 1 ===
==== Scene 1 (The Renunciation) ====
Gotama, the privileged young man who will become the Buddha, paces around the stage. His distraught mother and father stand to one side. Gotama sings of his longing to achieve freedom from craving and gain insight into the meaning of human suffering. He vows to become a wandering ascetic despite the grief it will cause his parents. After he leaves, his father and mother reveal themselves as Māra and his daughter Taṇhā, their despair turning to cynical laughter. Taṇhā mocks Gotama’s intentions. Māra sings of his ability to know Gotama’s weaknesses and vows to obstruct him whenever he can.

==== Scene 2 (The Victory) ====
On the bank of the Neranjara River, in the shade of a tree, Gotama sits, emaciated, determined, composed. Māra approaches holding a guitar. He tries to persuade Gotama to relinquish his quest for awakening, but Gotama is resolute in his resolve. Desolate, Māra withdraws and sits to one side. His daughter Taṇhā appears and assures her father that she will seduce Gotama and lure him away from his goal. Despite her efforts, she fails. She admits that Gotama has passed beyond all temptation and there is no way to prevent him from reaching his goal. Māra, Taṇhā, and Gotama sing together, each in his or her own world. Overcome with sorrow, Māra drops his guitar and vanishes.

==== Scene 3 (The Awakening) ====
Alone, Gotama sits beneath the bodhi tree and sings of what it means to have reached the goal of full awakening.

=== Act 2 ===
==== Scene 1 (The Rejection) ====
The second act opens with the figure of Korakkhattiya, the “Dog Man,” an ascetic who behaves like a dog. Gotama enters accompanied by his disciple Sunakkhatta, who is impressed with the Dog Man and declares him to be enlightened. Gotama rejects this suggestion, which leads Sunakkhatta to complain that Gotama has failed him by not performing any miracles or teaching him the origin of things. Gotama dismisses these criticisms as irrelevant to his teaching. Sunakkhatta decides to abandon him and leave the order of monks.

==== Scene 2 (The Denunciation) ====
Gotama is in a woodland grove near the city of Vesali, the hometown of Sunakkhatta. His attendant Ānanda arrives and tells him that Sunakkhatta has just denounced Gotama to the parliament in Vesali as a mere intellectual without any supernatural powers. Gotama rejects Sunakkhatta’s criticisms by treating them as unintended praise.

==== Scene 3 (The Sickness) ====
Gotama is staying in the small village of Beluva, outside Vesali, where he has just completed what will be his final Rains Retreat, during which he fell ill and nearly died. Māra can be seen hidden in the background. Ānanda approaches Gotama and declares his grief at seeing his teacher so ill and implores him to live. Gotama berates him for not understanding how everything that is born must die. He delivers a stirring address, which includes the injunction “shine forth like a lamp.”

==== Scene 4 (The Resolves) ====
We find ourselves in the gloom of the Capala Shrine, where Gotama has gone in search of solitude. Māra approaches him from a dark recess. Now that Gotama has completed his life’s work, he argues, it is time for him to depart this world. Gotama tells Māra not to worry, as he has achieved what he resolved to do and his death will not be long delayed.

==== Scene 5 (The Last Meal) ====
This scene takes place in the town of Pava in the mango grove of Cunda the Smith, who has invited Gotama and Ānanda to take their midday meal. After eating a dish called “pig’s delight,” Gotama instructs Cunda to bury the food. He then collapses onto the ground, groaning in pain. He has just enough strength to enable Ānanda to help him reach the nearby town of Kusinara.

==== Scene 6 (The Death) ====
In the Sal grove of the Malla people in Kusinara, Gotama lies on his right side between two trees. Flowers fall from above as he speaks. Ānanda breaks down and weeps. Gotama explains to Ānanda how he envisages his teaching and community to continue after his death. He offers final words on what constitutes the heart of his teaching. After uttering the words “Things fall apart, tread the path with care,” he dies. Venerable Mahākassapa, a senior monk in Gotama’s community, pays homage, and Ānanda sings the final chorale.
