= David Batchelor (artist and writer) =

Scottish artist

David Batchelor (born 1955 in Dundee) is a Scottish artist and writer.

== Life and work ==
David Batchelor studied Fine Art at Trent Polytechnic, Nottingham (1975–8), and Cultural Theory at the Centre for Contemporary Cultural Studies, Birmingham University (1978–80). He has exhibited widely in the UK, continental Europe, the United States and Latin America; written two books, Minimalism (1997) and Chromophobia (2000); is the editor of Colour (2008); and contributed to a number of journals including Artscribe, Frieze (magazine), and Artforum. David was a member of Tate Britain Council from 2002 to 2005, an advisory body on development and programming at Tate Britain.

He has shown work internationally in many exhibitions including the British Art Show at SNGMA in Edinburgh, Days Like These: Tate Triennial of Contemporary Art at Tate Britain, the 26th São Paulo Biennale, Extreme Abstraction at the Albright-Knox Art Gallery in Buffalo, the Folkestone Triennial in Folkestone and Color Chart: Reinventing Color, 1950 to Today at the Museum of Modern Art in New York City and Tate Liverpool.

David Batchelor has made colourful lightbox installations using bits and pieces salvaged from the streets of London. Batchelor takes industrial debris – trolleys, shelving units, factory scrap – and transforms them into frames to hold assemblages of neon, perspex and found shopfront signs.

Since its refurbishment in 2018, London's Hayward Gallery has hosted the installation Sixty Minute Spectrum on its rooftop. Comprising transparent, illuminated pyramids that continuously shift across the full colour spectrum, the work reflects Batchelor's ongoing exploration of intense, synthetic colour within urban environments.

Two of his works are held in the Tate collection. He is the brother of Buddhist scholar and author Stephen Batchelor.

== Bibliography ==
- Batchelor, David, Found Monochromes, Ridinghouse: London, 2010
- Batchelor, David (ed.), Colour, Whitechapel: London/MIT Press: Boston, 2008
- Batchelor, David and Briony Fer, Unplugged, Talbot Rice Gallery: Edinburgh, 2007 ISBN 1 873108 53 2
- Batchelor, David, Chromophobia, Reaktion Books: London, 2000 ISBN 978-1-86189-074-0
