= Jaya Chakrabarti =

British data scientist, academic and business owner (born 1973)

Jaya Chakrabarti MBE
- Born: 1973 (age 52–53); Watford
- Occupations: Scientist, campaigner

Jaya Chakrabarti (born April 1973) MBE is a data scientist, academic and business owner. She is the founder of TISC Report, a business ethics and anti-modern slavery company that contributed to the passing of the 2015 Modern Slavery Act.

== Biography ==
Chakrabarti was born In Watford before moving to Bristol. Chakrabarti runs the digital agency Nameless, President of the Bristol Chamber of Commerce, board member of Home Office Transparency in Supply Chains MSSIG (Modern Slavery Strategy & Implementation Group), and ran the successful campaign to appoint a Mayor of Bristol in 2012.

Chakrabarti chaired a local democracy organisation, Bristol Manifesto. She is also a Research Fellow with the University of Northampton Business School. Her digital agency, Nameless, campaigns against modern slavery. As CEO of Transparency in the Supply Chains (TISC), a public database of company compliance with anti-slavery laws, Chakrabarti has called for companies to evidence their actions to combat modern slavery. Through her work with TISC, she helped make the Modern Slavery Act 2015 into law.

Chakrabarti served on the Board of Bristol's Watershed Media Centre from 2003 to 2015, was a member of OFCOM's Consumer Panel from 2012 to 2018, and is a Business Fellow with the University of the West of England.

Chakrabarti was made a Member of the Order of the British Empire (MBE) in the 2014 Birthday Honours, for "services to creative digital industries and the community in Bristol".

In 2017 she and her husband Stuart Gallemore helped to save the life of a man who fell into Bristol Harbour while drunk by alerting others who came to his aid.

In 2021 she became President of the Bristol Chamber of Commerce.

== Awards and recognitions ==
- 2014: Awarded a MBE
- 2019: Listed in the WISE100 list: UK’s top 100 women in social enterprise and impact investment by the Pioneers Post
- 2023: Awarded an honorary doctorate from the University of Bristol
