= Parosha Chandran =

Modern slavery professor, human rights barrister

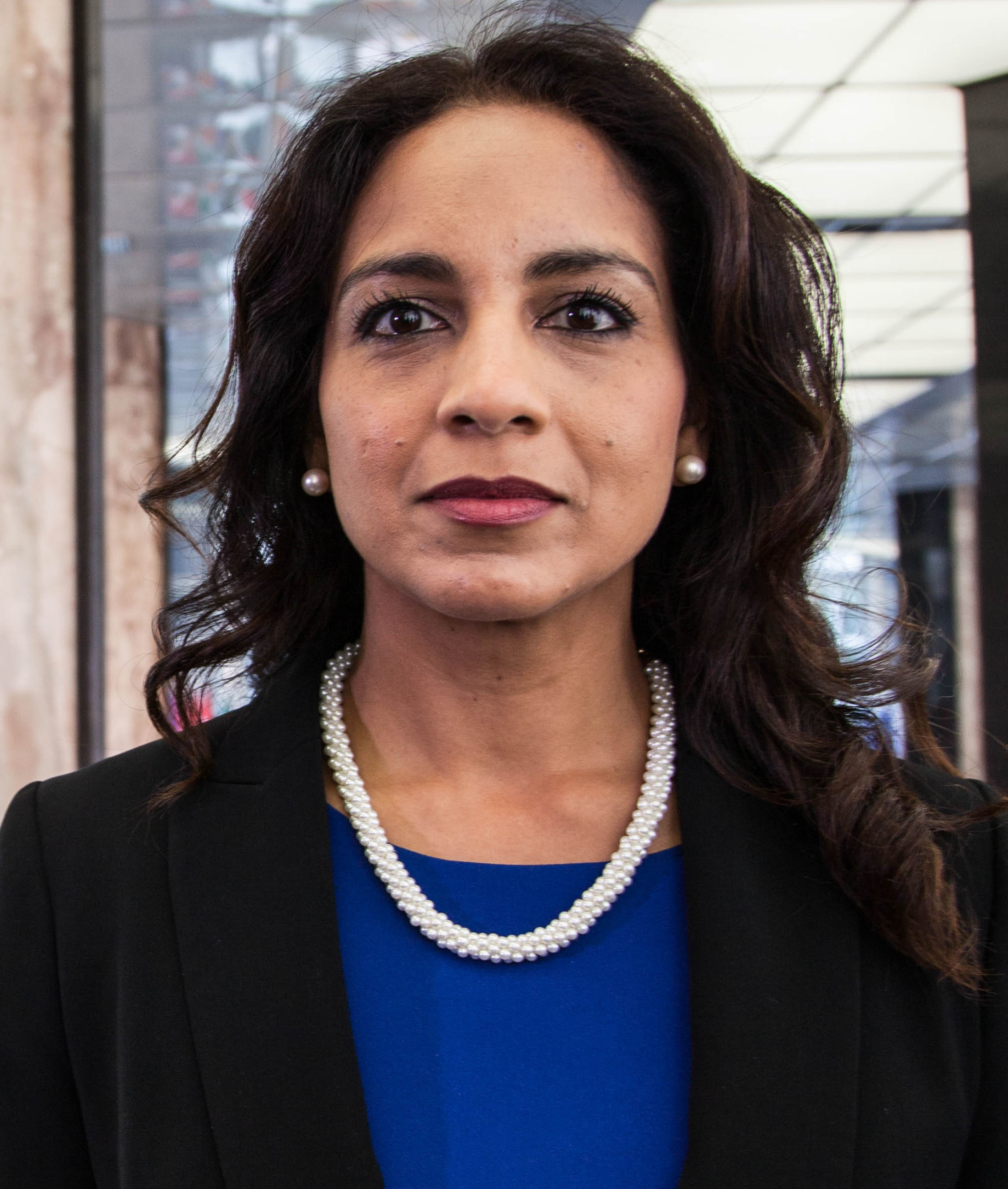
- Chandran in 2015
- Born: 1969 or 1970 (age 56–57); Sutton in Ashfield, England
- Occupations: Professor of modern slavery law, human rights barrister, expert advisor on human trafficking law
- Employer(s): King's College London; One Pump Court
- Known for: Human rights legal expertise and landmark cases

Parosha Chandran (born 1969 or 1970) is a Professor of Practice in Modern Slavery Law in The Dickson Poon School of Law, King's College London. She is also a human rights barrister at One Pump Court and an expert advisor on human trafficking law for the United Nations and the Council of Europe.

== Early life and education ==
Chandran was born in Sutton-in-Ashfield in Nottinghamshire. Her mother is from northern Pakistan and Muslim, and her late father was a Tamil Hindu from northern Sri Lanka. Both her parents were doctors, and later Mayor and Mayoress of the Borough of Gedling. She attended the Nottingham Girls High School.

Chandran completed her L.L.B.(Honours) at the University of London and a teacher-training course in Human Rights from the International Centre for the Teaching of Human Rights in Universities, Strasbourg. During her L.L.B. program, she was inspired to pursue human rights as a career after hearing Theodor Meron speak about the Bosnian War. In 2019, she described the experience as, "I felt an almost physical pain when I learned about the war crimes being committed, neighbour against neighbour, yet I found peace in a calm realisation that law could help. The fight wasn’t for myself anymore. I would fight for the human rights of others." She completed her L.L.M at University College London and completed a diploma in human rights from the International Institute of Human Rights in Strasbourg.

== Career ==
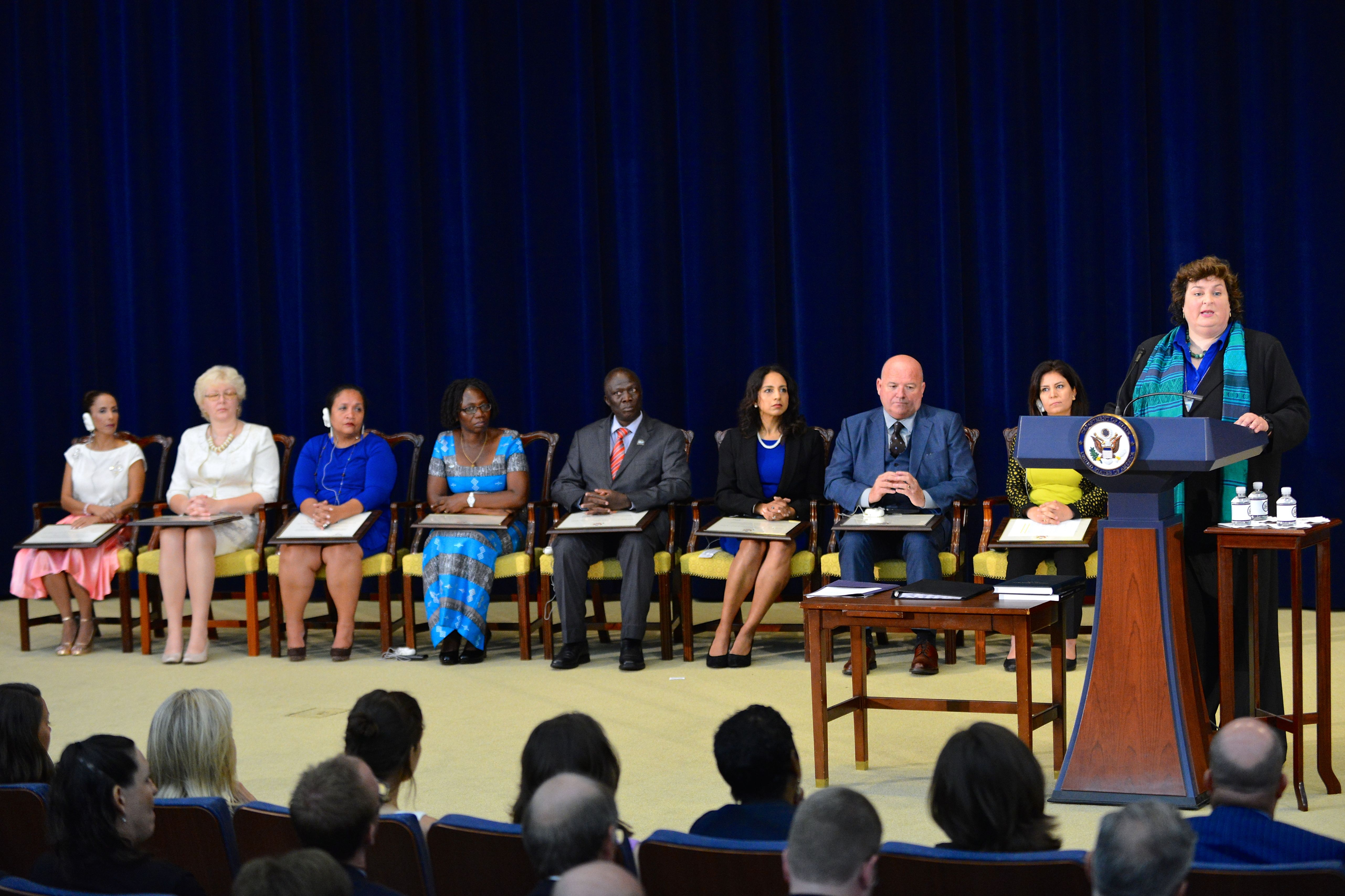
Chandran (fourth from right) at a US State Department Trafficking in Persons Report ceremony in 2015

From 1993 to 1995, Chandran served as a volunteer with the British Institute of Human Rights, and was an intern with The AIRE Centre from 1995 to 1996. She was also an intern with the European Commission of Human Rights in 1996 and the United Nations High Commissioner for Refugees in 1997.

Chandran became a practicing barrister at the Bar of England and Wales in 1997. In 1997, she was a human rights research consultant for King's College London, and from 1997 to 1998, an Independent Legal Advisor on human rights legislation to the Lord Chancellor's Department. In 1999, she worked for the Office of the Prosecutor, UN International Criminal Tribunal for the Former Yugoslavia, located in The Hague, Netherlands. She served as a law clerk for the trial of General Blaški, which included drafting a legal argument for witness anonymity that became the first such petition granted by the tribunal.

She has served as Governor of the British Institute of Human Rights from 1998 through 2000, as a Trustee from 2000 through 2010 and as Vice Chair from 2008 through 2010. Beginning in 2012, Chandran has worked as an expert for the Council of Europe and the United Nations on issues related to human trafficking, and was a member of the Group of Experts of the United Nations Office on Drugs and Crime from 2012 through 2014. From 2013 through 2018, she worked as an expert for the Organization for Security and Co-operation in Europe (OSCE) on issues related to human trafficking. From 2007 through 2017, she served as an independent legal advisor to Anti-Slavery International, and she has been an independent adviser on child trafficking to UNICEF UK since 2014.

From 2013 to 2015, she was an independent adviser on modern slavery exploitation bills of Scotland and Northern Ireland, after representing Patience Asuquo, whose slavery case and later testimony before a UK Parliament committee helped shape the Modern Slavery Act 2015. Beginning in 2017, she has been a senior legal adviser for UK Parliament CPA UK Modern Slavery Project, which has included drafting anti-slavery legislation for Uganda.

Her work as a barrister includes the successful representation of A.N. in V.C.L and A.N. v. the United Kingdom (2021), a landmark case before the European Court of Human Rights, and related representation in the UK. In 2008, while in practice at 1 Pump Court, she successfully changed Home Office policy in a landmark case that established protections against deportation for survivors of trafficking who gave evidence against traffickers. She also helped legally establish protection against prosecution for survivors of trafficking for crimes directly related to the trafficking.

In 2018, Chandran became the first Professor of modern slavery law at King's College London.

== Commentary ==
Chandran has regularly provided expert commentary about issues related to modern slavery, including calling for enhanced supply chain laws in 2020, and for the criminalization of slavery in 2018 while serving as part of a delegation from the UK Modern Slavery Project to Uganda to support the drafting of anti-slavery, anti-trafficking, and anti-commercial sexual exploitation legislation. In 2017, she provided commentary on law enforcement responses to modern slavery, and what the general public can do to help. In 2014, she discussed the Modern Slavery Act 2015 while it was being developed.

In 2018, she was a speaker at The Second International Maritime Human Rights Conference on the topic of 'Proofing your supply chain against modern slavery.'

== Publications ==
- Chandran, Parosha, ed. (2011). Human Trafficking Handbook: Recognising Trafficking and Modern-Day Slavery in the UK. London: Lexis-Nexis. ISBN 9781405765596. OCLC 751752752.

== Honours and awards ==
- 2008, Law Society of England and Wales Barrister of the Year
- 2009, Society of Asian Lawyers' Pro Bono/Human Rights Lawyer of the Year Award
- 2009, The Times Law Panel (100 most influential lawyers in the UK)
- 2015, U.S. Department of State 'Trafficking in Persons Hero Award'

== Professional memberships ==
- Member of the Foreign and Commonwealth Office’s Pro Bono Lawyers Panel (2003-)
- Member of Lincoln's Inn Euro Committee (2005-)
- Co-founder of the Trafficking Law and Policy Forum (2007-)
- Member of The Times Law Panel (2009-)
- Member, Presidential Task Force on Human Trafficking, International Bar Association (2015)

== Personal life ==
Chandran lives in Fulham, London and has one son.
