= EU Anti-Trafficking Day =

EU Anti-Trafficking Day is a day dedicated to raise awareness annually on trafficking in human beings in Europe and it is being marked on the "18th of October". It is a day to commemorate victims who have suffered from human trafficking and smuggling as well as to raise awareness of and advance the fight against this heinous crime. The purpose is to raise awareness on trafficking in human beings and increase the exchange of information, knowledge and best practices amongst the different actors working in this field.

EU Anti-Trafficking Day serves as an occasion to bolster Europe-wide commitment for ending trafficking in human beings, to raise awareness, exchange know-how and best practices, and take stock of what has been achieved in Europe. Every year events are hosted across the European Union to inform, exchange and debate, as well as a chance to move forward important commitments and policies on this subject. Women and children were the highest number of trafficked persons while men are trafficked for labor exploitation.

The EU Anti-Trafficking is being coordinated by Diane Schmitt.

== History ==
In 2007, the European Commission launched the EU Anti-Trafficking Day campaign.

== Yearly commemoration ==
2007

The first EU Anti-Trafficking Day in 2007 had the motto "Time for action".

=== 2011 ===
The fifth EU Anti-Trafficking day was held in Warsaw. The event was themed “Together Against Trafficking in Human Beings".

=== 2013 ===
The 7th EU Anti-Trafficking Day is being marked in Vilnius by the Lithuanian Presidency of the Council of the EU, and the European Commission.

=== 2012 – 2016 ===
The EU Strategy towards the Eradication of Trafficking in Human Beings specified clear actions to prevent trafficking, such as EU-wide awareness-raising activities and campaigns, partnerships with the private sector, and addressing demand for trafficking.
