= Human Trafficking Foundation =

The Human Trafficking Foundation is a London-based charity founded by the Conservative Party politician and former Member of Parliament, Anthony Steen. Robyn Phillips directs the NGO. The Foundation was the result of work done by the All Party Parliamentary Group on Human Trafficking. Before he left parliament in 2010, Steen was also successful in putting through a Private Member's Bill to establish a national Anti-Slavery Day in the UK.

The organisation works with NGOs and charities in the sector combatting human trafficking around the UK. Between 2011 and 2013 it worked with ECPAT UK and Asociata High Level Group for Children (Romania) to establish Parliamentarians Against Human Trafficking, a Europe-wide project to create a network of parliamentarians across the continent fighting human trafficking. In 2011 the Foundation was also involved in revealing that it was mainly women who were entrapping and forcing women into prostitution in the United Kingdom.
