= Christopher Titmuss =

British Dhamma teacher

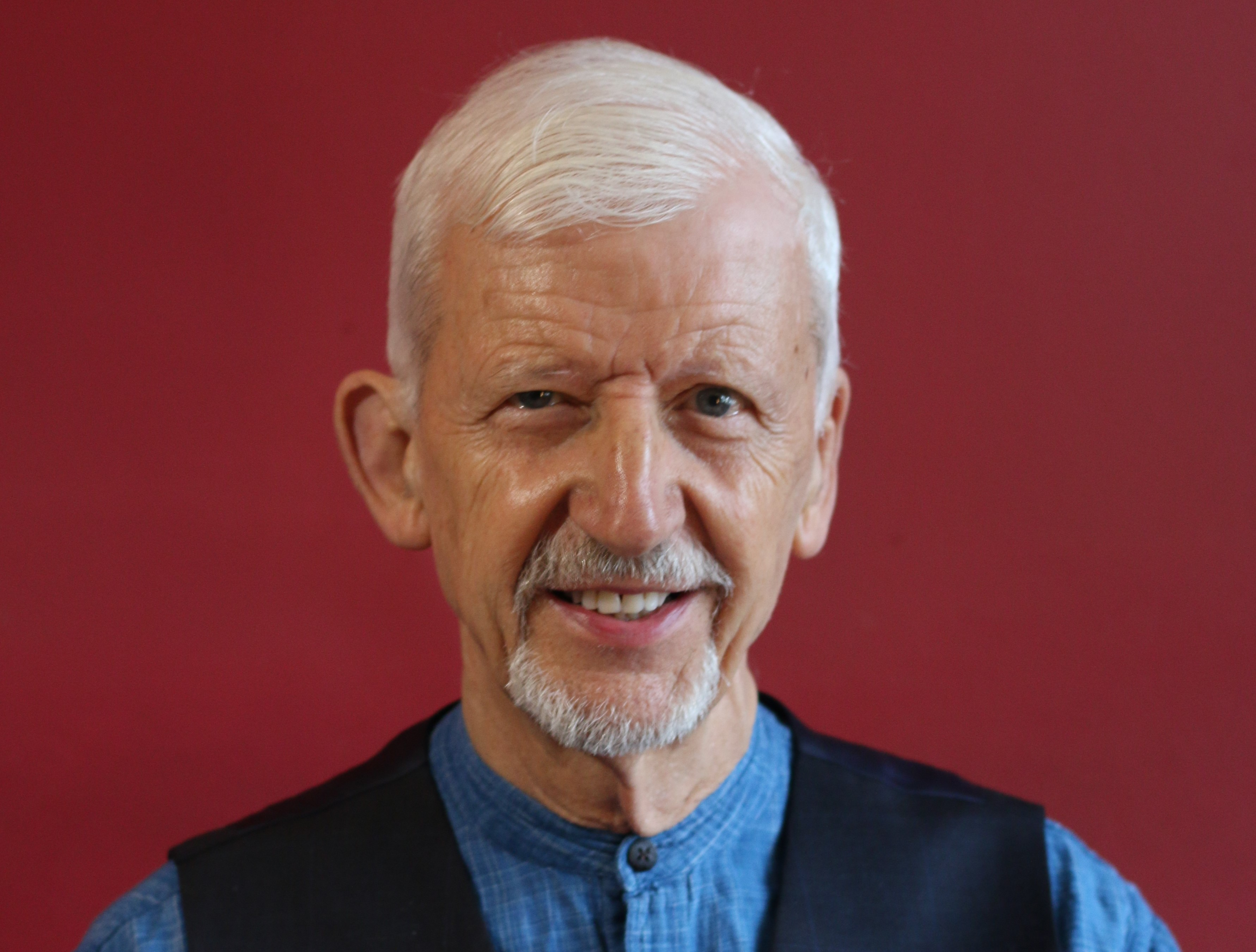

Personal life
- Born: 22 April 1944 (age 82)
- Occupation: Dhamma teacher

Religious life
- Religion: Buddhism
- School: Theravada background

Senior posting
- Based in: Totnes, Devon, England
- Website: www.christophertitmuss.net

Christopher Titmuss (born 22 April 1944) is a British Dhamma teacher. He offers retreats on ethics, insight meditation (vipassana), and wisdom. He is the author of 20 books on such themes as mindfulness, spirituality, teachings of the Buddha, and global issues. He has lived in Totnes, Devon, since 1982.

== Biography ==
Titmuss was born on 22 April 1944 on Bell Farm, Middleton-in-Teesdale, County Durham, in the north of England. His mother brought him up as a practicing Roman Catholic. He went to St. Anthony's Roman Catholic Primary School in Anerley, south London. He attended Fairchilds Junior School in New Addington, Surrey.

Titmuss then attended John Fisher Roman Catholic Grammar School, Purley, Surrey, as a day pupil. At the age of 15, he quit school a year prior to taking his examinations for college/university. He started work as an office clerk/messenger in December 1959 in the newsroom of The Universe, a Roman Catholic weekly newspaper in Fleet Street, London. In 1965, he joined the London office of the Irish Independent as a news reporter until he left for his round-the-world trip in April 1967.

After three years traveling through more than 20 countries, he became a Theravada Buddhist monk in Thailand in June 1970. He spent six years in Thailand and India as a monk. He disrobed in Wat Benchamabophit, Bangkok, in June 1976.

Between 1970 and 1973, he stayed in Wat Thao Kot Monastery (later renamed as Wat Sai Ngam) close to Nakornsridhammaraj in southern Thailand. He practiced insight under the guidance of Ajahn Dhammadharo, his Vipassana teacher.

In 1973, Titmuss spent nine months in a cave in Wat Khao Tam on Koh Pha Ngan island in the Gulf of Siam. He spent various lengths of time with Ajahn Buddhadasa in Wat Suanmoke, Chai Ya. Between 1974 and 1976, he listening to/attended courses with/or stayed in the ashram of such teachers in India as Ananda Maya Ma, S.N.Goenka, Kirpal Singh, Krishnamurti, Mother Teresa, Anagarika Munindra, Sri Chinmayananda, Sri Dayananda, Sri Nisargadatta, Bhagwan Sri Rajneesh and more.

After he disrobed, he completed a full journey around the world including Australia, New Zealand, Thailand, Hong Kong, Korea, San Francisco, New York and back to London. He returned to England 10 years and 10 days after his departure arriving back home in Croydon, Surrey, in early May 1977.

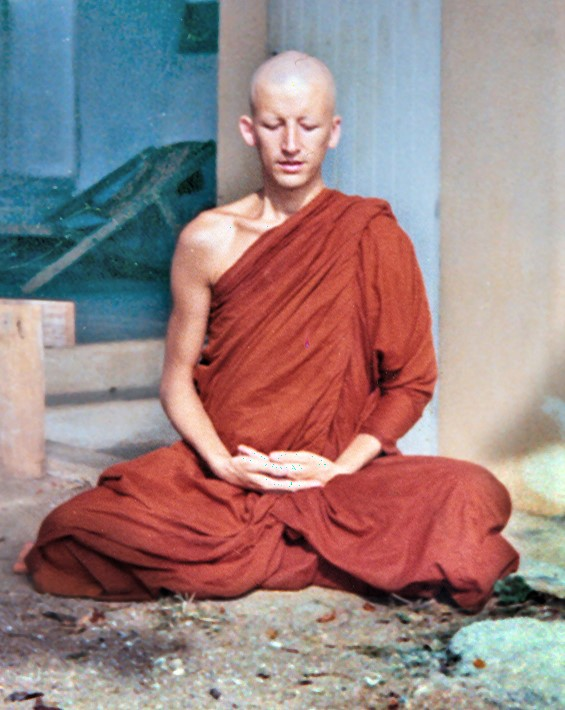
Titmuss in Thailand in 1973

== Teachings ==
His teachings emphasise liberation, emptiness of self/ego, dependent arising and the power of love. In his retreats, Titmuss prioritises the depths of insight meditation and reflection. He gives emphasis to the expansive heart and inquiry into the end of suffering. He draws upon the wisdom of the Buddha offering an expansive approach to the teachings and practices. He supports the development of the Sangha (women/men of profound insight and wise action).

Titmuss is known as a steadfast exponent of applying the Dhamma to contemporary issues facing people, animals and the environment. He speaks, writes and campaigns on social, political and global issues. He also advocates the development of spiritual values, community renewal and a green economy. He points to a middle way between secular/scientific Buddhism and religious Buddhism while naming the benefits and limits of both.

Titmuss gives residential retreats, leads pilgrimages (yatras) and facilitates meetings. He provides a 12-month training in the Mindfulness Teacher Training Course. His mindfulness teacher training emphases personal and social change.

He has helped establish numerous Dhamma teachers and Mindfulness teachers worldwide since starting teaching in the mid-1970s. He encourages Dhamma practitioners to be Agents of Change and Caregivers. Titmuss does not use the label ‘Buddhist’ for himself but expresses the deep benefits of his long-standing connection with the Buddhist tradition.

== Projects ==
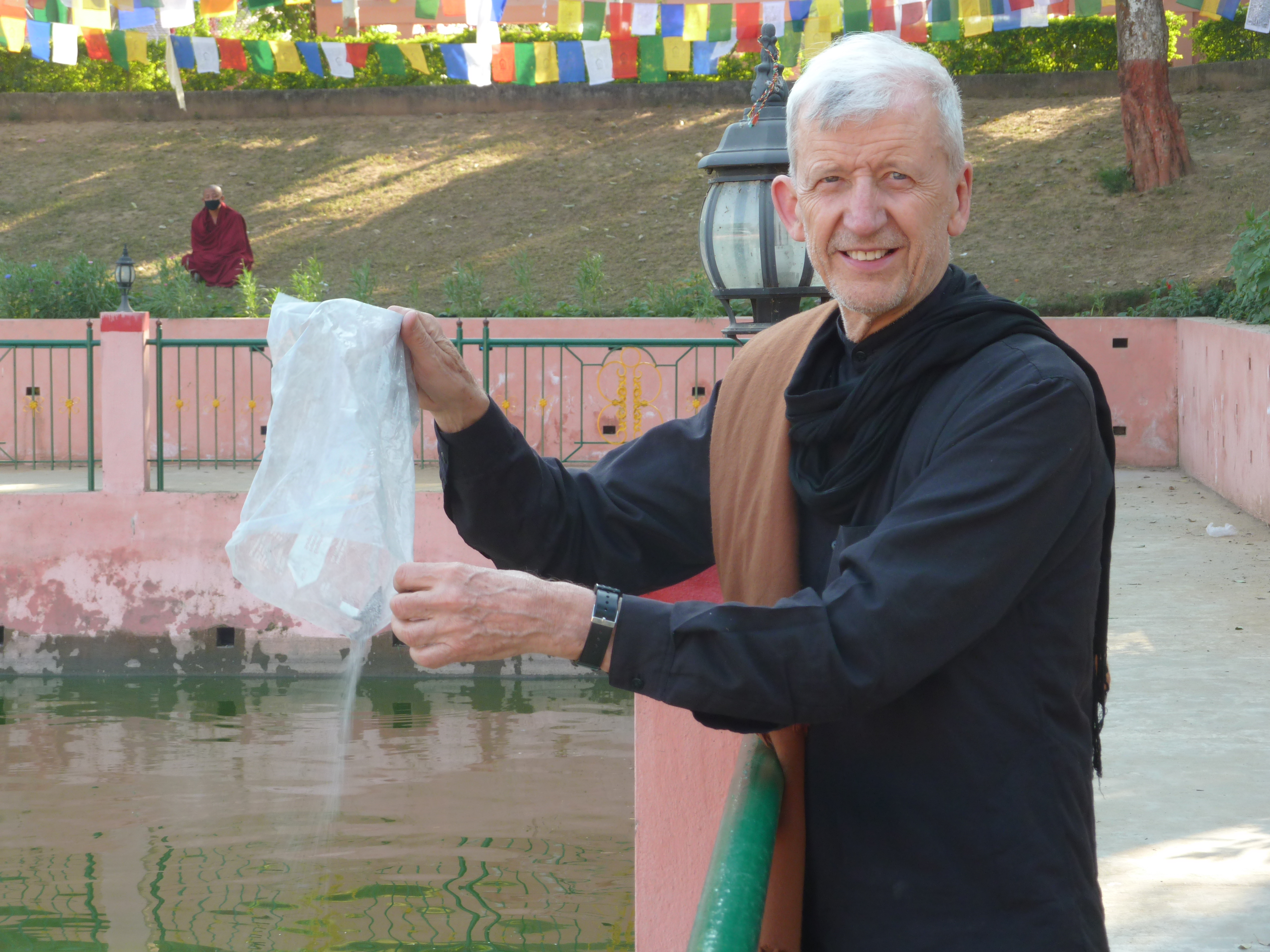
Titmuss in Bodh Gaya, India

- Co-founder of Gaia House, a major Buddhist retreat center near Newton Abbot, south Devon, England.
- Co-founder of The Barn Retreat Community near Totnes in South Devon.
- Co-founder of the Prajna Vihar School, an inter-religious free school, with 600 children in Bodh Gaya, India.
- Director of Mindfulness Support Service, UK, supporting families and public servants. Founder/CEO is Nshorna Davis, daughter of Titmuss.
- Founder of the 12-month Mindfulness Teacher Training Course (MTTC).
- Stood for the Green Party in UK general elections in 1987 and 1992 in Totnes, south Devon.
- Supporter of non-party grass roots organizations for social, institutional and global change.

== Outreach ==
Titmuss gives annual teachings in Australia, India, Israel and Germany. He has made numerous trips to Palestine since 1993. In 2009, he reduced his overseas travels by two months a year at the age of 65. He ended annual visits to Holland, Spain, Sweden and USA.

He has been teaching annual retreats in the Thai Monastery in Bodh Gaya, Bihar, India since 1975 and then the Thai Monastery in Sarnath, India, where the Buddha gave his first teachings after his enlightenment in Bodh Gaya.

He is the author of 20 books including The Political Buddha, The Buddha of Love, Spiritual Roots of Mindfulness and Light on Enlightenment.

Titmuss is a social critic, photographer and poet. More than 1,200 of his talks are freely available as a podcast, archive.org and i-Tunes. Around 5000 of his talks, guided meditations and one-to-one inquiry with meditators are in cassette format or MP3. He has around 100 video talks, guided meditations and clips on YouTube.

He sends out an eNews every six weeks to more than 6,000 subscribers. Since 2011, Titmuss writes a weekly Dhamma blog, which includes social critiques. He offers reflections and essays on mindfulness, meditation, religion and spirituality. The blog gives a Buddhist perspective on daily life issues, consumerism, corporations, the environment and war. He has written on the global pandemic starting in early 2020 with reflections on life and death.

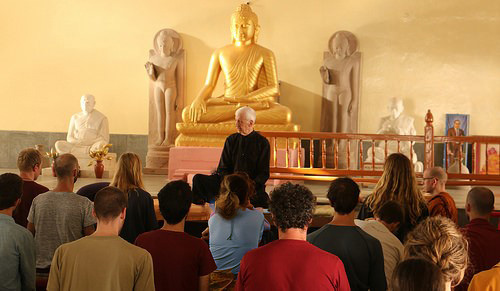
Titmuss teaching in Thai monastery in Sarnath, India

A German film company made a documentary for television in 2006 on the teachings and worldwide travels of Titmuss. The Buddha Wallah by Georg Maas and Dieter Zeppenfeld.

== Personal life ==
Titmuss has lived in the same terraced house in Totnes since 1983. He has a single child, a daughter, Nshorna Satya. He has four Anglo-Caribbean grandchildren. He participates in activities of Totnes, regarded as the most progressive town in the UK on spiritual, social and environmental issues. Titmuss has been a vegetarian since the 1970s and vegan since 2008. He does not own a car. He only takes flights to teach outside of the EU but does not fly anywhere for holidays.

He purchases his food items in small local shops and markets. He does not shop in supermarkets. He writes at a desk in the Totnes Reconomy Centre, five minutes’ walk from home for some of his writing. He also has a room in his home as an office. The home of Titmuss contains 1,500 plus books on a wide range of themes. He uses social media, such as Facebook, Twitter and LinkedIn, to post links from his blog. He visits Cornwall, the neighboring county to Devon, three or four times a year for a personal retreat which includes walking on the clifftops.

He does not charge for his retreats and instead requests donations at the end of the retreat. He has lived primarily on donations since his ordination in 1970.

== Bibliography ==
- Titmuss, Christopher (2018). The Political Buddha. Lulu Books. ISBN 978-0-244-08246-8.
- Titmuss, Christopher (2018). The Spiritual Roots of Mindfulness. Lulu Books. ISBN 978-0-244-75062-6.
- Titmuss, Christopher (2017). The Explicit Buddha. Lulu Books. ISBN 978-0-244-30103-3.
- Titmuss, Christopher (2015). Poems from the Edge of Time. Lulu Books. ISBN 978-1-326-34283-8.
- Titmuss, Christopher (2015). The Mindfulness Manual. Lulu Books. ISBN 978-1-326-34280-7.
- Titmuss, Christopher (2014). The Buddha of Love. Lulu Books. ISBN 978-1-326-14689-4.
- Titmuss, Christopher (2003). Mindfulness for Everyday Living. Barron's Educational Series. ISBN 0-7641-2260-6. OCLC 51884364.
- Titmuss, Christopher (2002). Transforming Our Terror: A Spiritual Approach to Making Sense of Senseless Tragedy. Barron's. ISBN 0-7641-2221-5. OCLC 51265182.
- Titmuss, Christopher (2002). Sons and Daughters of the Buddha. Rider. ISBN 0-7126-5699-5. OCLC 50271880.
- Titmuss, Christopher (2001). Buddhist Wisdom for Daily Living. Walking Stick Press. ISBN 1-58297-090-4. OCLC 48388968.
- Titmuss, Christopher (2001). The Buddha's Book of Daily Meditations: A Year of Wisdom, Compassion, and Happiness. Three Rivers Press. ISBN 0-609-80780-3. OCLC 47050160.
- Titmuss, Christopher (1999). The Power of Meditation: Energize the Mind & Restore the Body. Sterling Publishing. ISBN 1-86505-062-8. OCLC 154675516.
- Titmuss, Christopher (1999). An Awakened Life: Using Everyday Experiences for Inner Fulfilment. Rider. ISBN 0-7126-7088-2. OCLC 59451207.
- Titmuss, Christopher (1999). Little Box of Inner Calm. Barron's Educational Series. ISBN 0-7641-7303-0.
- Titmuss, Christopher (1998). Light on Enlightenment: Revolutionary Teachings on the Inner Life. Rider. ISBN 0-7126-7122-6. OCLC 41840527.
- Titmuss, Christopher; Gill Farrer-Halls (1995). The Green Buddha. Insight Books (Totnes). ISBN 1-899289-00-3. OCLC 60281167.
- Titmuss, Christopher (1993). The Profound and the Profane: An Inquiry into Spiritual Awakening. Insight Books. ISBN 0-946672-27-X.
- Titmuss, Christopher (1993). Spirit of Change: Voices of Hope for a Better World. Hunter Press. ISBN 0-89793-104-1.
- Titmuss, Christopher (1992). Fire Dance and Other Poems. Insight. ISBN 0-946672-25-3. OCLC 28584222.
- Titmuss, Christopher (1991). Freedom of the Spirit: More Voices of Hope for a World in Crisis. Green Print. ISBN 1-85425-056-6. OCLC 24953676.
