= Dame Janet Smith Review =

2012–2016 investigation of the BBC's connection to sexual abuse by Jimmy Savile

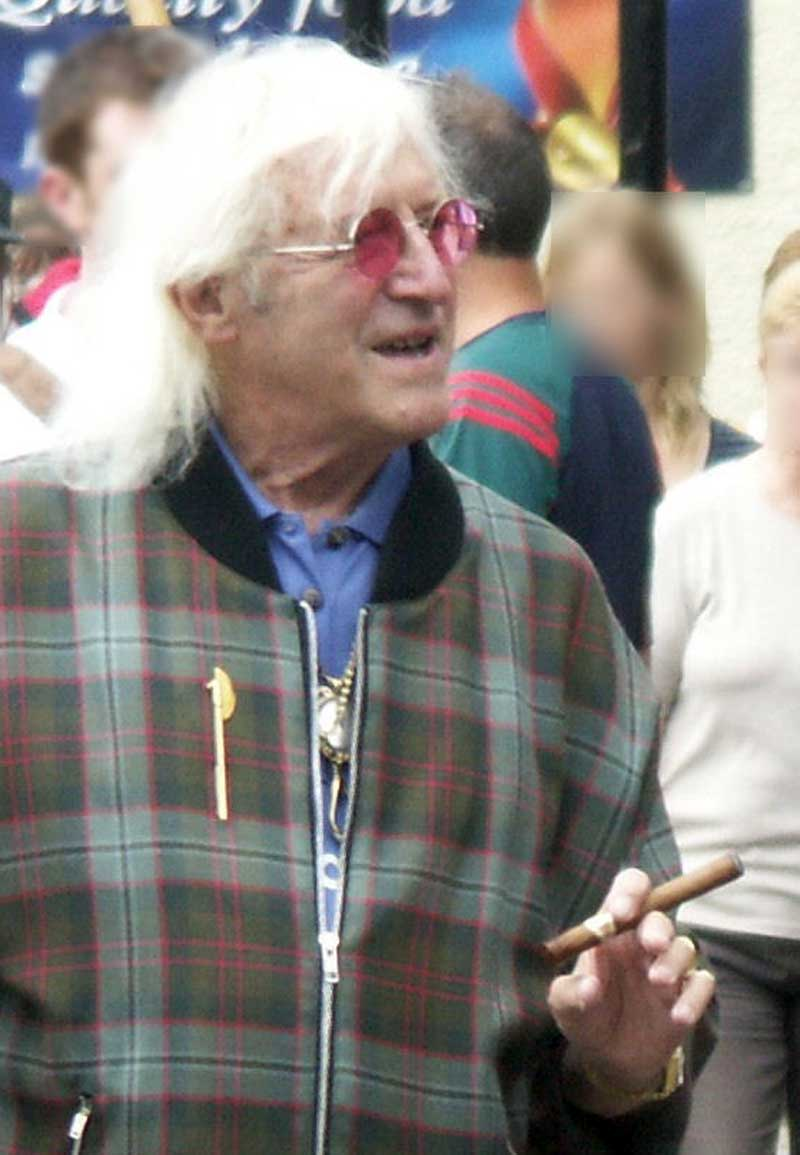
Dame Janet Smith led the inquiry into sexual misconduct at the BBC by Jimmy Savile.

In October 2012, Dame Janet Smith was appointed by the BBC to lead an inquiry into the corporation's connection to the sexual abuse committed by Jimmy Savile, a popular television and radio host. The final report, titled The Dame Janet Smith Review Report, was published on 25 February 2016.

In her investigation, Smith called for evidence from people who were the subject of inappropriate sexual conduct by Jimmy Savile on BBC premises, or on location for the BBC; people who knew of or suspected such conduct; anyone who raised concerns about Savile's conduct within the BBC; people who worked for or with Savile on programmes at the BBC between about 1964 and 2007, or who were familiar with "the culture or practices of the BBC during that time insofar as they may have been relevant to preventing or enabling the sexual abuse of children, young people or teenagers"; and people who held senior positions at the BBC who may have relevant information.

She found that Savile had sexually abused 72 people and had raped eight people, including an eight-year-old. Offences had occurred at "virtually every one of the BBC premises at which he worked". She also found that some members of the BBC staff were aware of complaints against Savile but did nothing about them.

== History ==
The Report was announced in October 2012, and Dame Janet Smith, who had led The Shipman Inquiry, was selected to lead the inquiry.

The investigation was delayed when Dame Janet Smith was contacted by the Metropolitan Police regarding their investigations into offences against children. Their investigation on Savile, Operation Yewtree, was completed in December 2012, and their report on his alleged offending, Giving Victims a Voice, was released the following month.

In January 2014, it was claimed in The Observer that Smith's review had concluded Savile had abused "many hundreds and potentially up to 1,000 people" on BBC premises, according to a source connected with the investigation. However, this Observer report was immediately denounced by the Dame Janet Smith Review as "speculative and unreliable". The report was delayed again in 2014 so it would not prejudice the second trial of ex-BBC presenter Stuart Hall, who had previously been convicted of child sex offences. On 1 May 2015, it was announced that the review report was finished, but it could not be published as it might prejudice ongoing police investigations.

In January 2016, investigative news site Exaro leaked extracts of Smith's report. The extracts detailed numerous sex offences allegedly committed by Savile, all "in some way associated with the BBC", and concluded that it was possible that a predatory child sex offender could be "lurking undiscovered" even today, but stopped short of criticising the BBC for failing to uncover Savile's behaviour. Smith responded by stating that the leaked draft should never had been made public, as it was out of date and unreliable. Earlier that week, police confirmed they were no longer concerned about the review prejudicing ongoing investigations.

The full report was officially released on 25 February 2016.

== Summary ==
In her report, Smith addressed the following questions:

- Did Savile commit acts of inappropriate sexual conduct in connection with his work for the BBC?
- Were any concerns raised within the BBC whether formally or informally about Savile’s inappropriate sexual conduct?
- To what extent were BBC personnel aware of inappropriate sexual conduct by Savile in connection with his work for the BBC?
- To what extent ought BBC personnel to have been aware of inappropriate sexual conduct by Savile in connection with his work for the BBC?
- Did the culture and practices within the BBC during the years of Savile’s employment enable Savile’s inappropriate sexual conduct to continue unchecked?

She then provided a number of recommendations for reform of the BBC's internal processes based on her investigation.

== Findings ==
The review, which totalled more than 700 pages, found Savile had sexually abused 72 people and had raped eight people, including an eight-year-old, at "virtually every one of the BBC premises at which he worked". Smith stated that some BBC staff members were aware of complaints against Savile but did not pass the information to senior management due to the "culture of not complaining." She described an "atmosphere of fear" still existing at the BBC and that some of those interviewed for the inquiry did so only after being assured their names would not be published, as they feared reprisal.

A separate review into the offending of Stuart Hall found that he had assaulted 21 female victims at the BBC, the youngest of whom was aged ten, between 1967 and 1991. The report found that some BBC staff members were aware he was bringing underage girls into his dressing room for sex, but his "untouchable" celebrity status stopped them from passing complaints to senior management.

== Tony Blackburn sacking ==
Prior to the release of the report on 25 February 2016, the DJ Tony Blackburn, identified only as 'A7' in the Exaro leaks, released a statement announcing that he had been sacked by the BBC. The report criticised the BBC for failing to properly investigate allegations made by a 15-year-old Top of the Pops audience member, Claire McAlpine, who claimed Blackburn seduced her in 1971 and killed herself not long afterwards. Blackburn, who denies the allegations, told the inquiry that he was not asked about the allegations by light entertainment head Bill Cotton and Sir Brian Neill QC in 1971 and 1972, although memos from the time indicated that he had been. He accused the BBC of a cover-up and that he intended to take legal action against the corporation. Blackburn returned to the BBC after eight months, not having taken any legal action.
