= Heather Steel =

British judge (1940–2026)

Dame Heather Steel
- Royal coat of arms of the United Kingdom

Justice of the High Court
- In office 1993–2001
- Monarch: Elizabeth II

Personal details
- Born: 3 July 1940 Cheshire, England
- Died: 9 September 2026 (aged 86)
- Education: University of Liverpool

Dame Anne Heather Steel, DBE (3 July 1940 – 9 September 2026) was a British High Court judge and judge on the Court of Appeal of Guernsey.

== Early life and education ==
Anne Heather Steel was born in Cheshire, England on 3 July 1940. She studied at Howell's School in Denbigh and completed an LLB at the University of Liverpool.

== Career ==
Steel was called to the bar at Gray's Inn in 1963, was appointed recorder in 1984, a circuit judge in 1986. From 1992 to 1995, she was member of the Criminal Committee of the Judicial Standards Board, and a tutor judge at the Judicial College, starring in a BBC documentary about the role.

=== Senior judicial career ===
Steel was appointed to High Court of England and Wales in 1993. Ann Ebsworth had been the first woman judge on the Queens Bench and Steel and Janet Smith soon joined her.

She served until 2001, taking early retirement in 2001 at the age of 61. She was appointed a DBE in 2003, and from 2004 served on the Court of Appeal of Guernsey until 2012.

After her 2001 High Court retirement, she continued to hear cases in the Royal Courts of Justice. In 2007, she gave the judgment in the Court of Appeal which cut actor Chris Langham's 10-month prison sentence for downloading child pornography and freed him six weeks early, a judgment which was criticised by child rights activists. Steel appeared on the bench in the Court of Appeal again in a 2009 drug trafficking case. Post her Guernsey Court of Appeal retirement, Steel continued to take on appointments. In 2013, she led an investigation into a child sex abuse case involving a Guernsey church warden.

== Personal life and death ==
Steel married David Kerr-Muir Beattie in 1967, with whom she had a daughter and a son. She died after a short illness on 9 September 2026, aged 86.
