= Giving Victims a Voice =

Report relating to the allegations of sexual abuse made against Jimmy Savile

- Report cover
- Ratified: 2013
- Authors: MPS; NSPCC

Giving Victims a Voice is a report published in January 2013, relating to allegations of sexual abuse made against English DJ and BBC Television presenter Jimmy Savile (1926–2011) as part of the Operation Yewtree criminal investigation. It was initiated as a result of publicity surrounding the Jimmy Savile sexual abuse scandal. The Metropolitan Police Service (MPS) and the National Society for the Prevention of Cruelty to Children (NSPCC) jointly produced this report. It marked the end of investigations made under the operation regarding Savile alone.

The scandal resulted in hundreds of alleged victims of Savile and other abusers approaching the police and the NSPCC. Their claims were investigated and formed the basis of the report, which found that Savile's alleged offences were committed across England and Scotland, in hospitals, prison facilities, schools and BBC premises. Offences were reported between 1955 and 2009, totalling 214 alleged offences across 28 police forces. The most frequent alleged offending coincided with Savile's peak celebrity status. Numbers of alleged victims totalled 450, of whom 328 were minors at the time. They were aged between 8 and 47 years, the majority being 13–16.

The Director of Public Prosecutions (DPP) described the report as marking a "watershed moment" and apologised for "shortcomings" in the handling of prior abuse claims. The report's publication resulted in some highlighting what could be systemic failure because of the number of complainants and institutions identified, but others criticised it for treating allegations as facts. The DPP's Principal Legal Advisor concluded that Savile could have been prosecuted for offences against at least three victims during his lifetime. After the report, investigations were further initiated in other hospitals. Ex-Metropolitan Police Commissioner Peter Spindler (who had previously led Operation Yewtree) estimated that there may be many more victims who had not come forward.

== Background ==
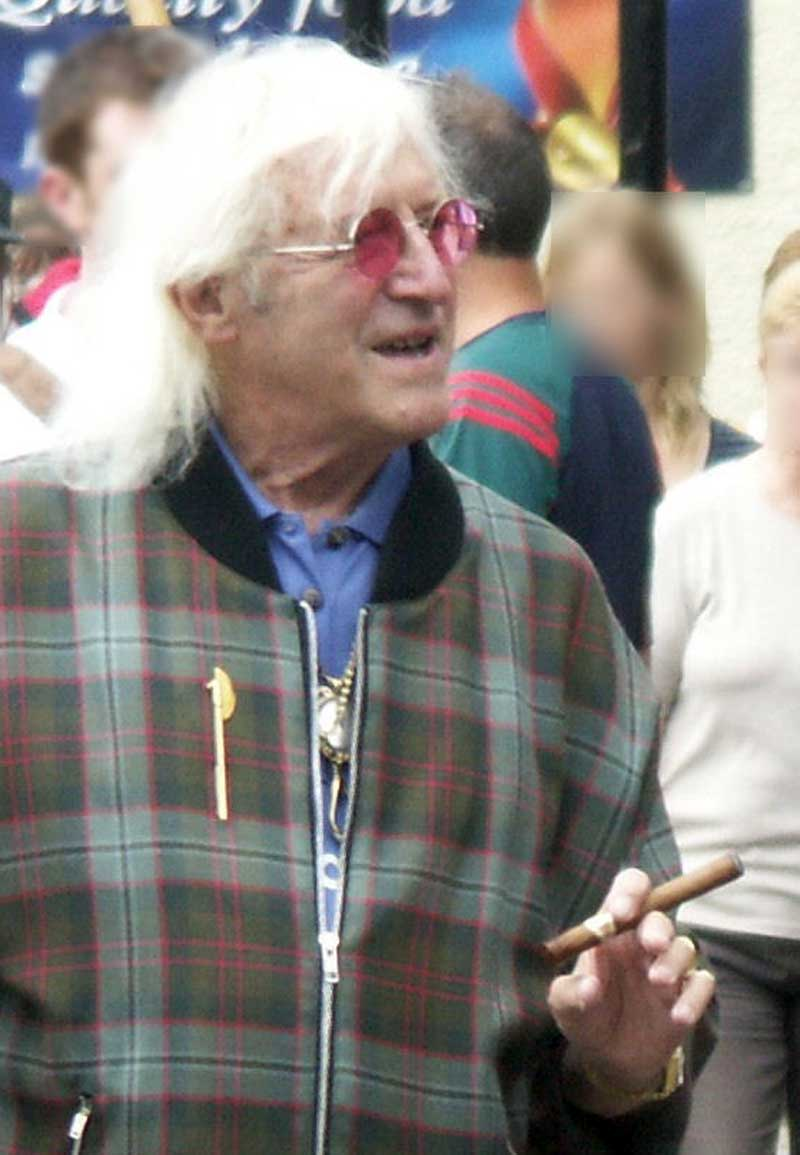
Jimmy Savile in 2006

In September and October 2012, claims were widely publicised that the English DJ and BBC Television presenter Jimmy Savile (31 October 1926 – 29 October 2011) had committed sexual abuse. The publicity began on 5 October 2012 after an ITV Exposure documentary broadcast allegations. By 11 October, allegations had been made to 13 British police forces. On 19 October, the Metropolitan Police Service launched a formal criminal investigation, Operation Yewtree, into historic allegations of child sexual abuse by Savile and others. It described the alleged abuse as being "on an unprecedented scale", and the number of potential victims as "staggering".

Much of Savile's career involved working with children and young people, including visiting schools and hospital wards. He spent 20 years presenting Top of the Pops before a teenage audience, and an overlapping 20 years presenting Jim'll Fix It, in which he helped the wishes of viewers, mainly children, come true. During his lifetime, two police investigations had looked into reports about Savile, the earliest known being in 1958, but none had led to charges; the reports had each concluded that there was insufficient evidence for any charges to be brought relating to sexual offences. In October 2012, it was announced that the Director of Public Prosecutions, Keir Starmer, would investigate why proceedings against Savile in 2009 were dropped.

The 30-page Giving Victims a Voice report, published on 11 January 2013, is a result of an investigation undertaken jointly by the MPS and the NSPCC. Its authors were Detective Superintendent David Gray, of the Metropolitan Police Service Paedophile Unit, and Peter Watt, Director of Child Protection Advice & Awareness at the NSPCC. The authors had two intentions in writing the report. These were to provide public acknowledgement to alleged victims that they were being listened to, and to learn how child protection can be improved as a result of the investigation.

The report marks the end of investigations regarding Savile alone, though enquiries in relation to living people are continuing.

== Summary of findings ==
According to the report, sex offences were committed by Savile on 450 people (328 being minors at the time) across England and Scotland, and also in Jersey. The vast majority of the alleged offences occurred in his home town of Leeds and his main workplace in London. The victims were mainly unacquainted with each other. Savile may have committed more than 30 rapes, with a total of 126 claims of indecent acts having been recorded.

Most of the alleged victims were aged 13–16, with 73% of the total being minors aged under 18. The alleged attacks were mostly against girls aged under 16. It also included 18 girls and 10 boys under the age of 10. The youngest alleged victim was aged 8 years and the oldest was 47. The report said that a dying child aged 11–12 was "touched inappropriately" by Savile. The report states that they were mostly opportunistic, although child grooming was involved in some cases. The first and final alleged offences were in 1955 and 2009. The period containing the most frequent offences was between 1966 and 1976 (when Savile was aged 40–50), coinciding with his peak status as a celebrity. The years 1975 and 1976 each had 15 recorded offences.

Geographical locations of the reported offences

Among other places, including BBC premises, the alleged offences occurred in hospitals (where he volunteered as a porter), schools (upon invitations related to the Jim'll Fix It TV show) and prison facilities. According to the report, they took place 33 times in television and radio studios. One included sexual abuse against a girl in July 2006, at the final recording of Top of the Pops. The report said that Savile's celebrity status meant that he must have been "hiding in plain sight". Operation Yewtree's senior investigating officer, DS David Gray, said Savile used Jim'll Fix It as a means of meeting victims.

Most of the allegations had not previously been reported to authorities, the reasons given included fear of disbelief and distrust in the judicial system. At least seven allegations of sexual assault made to police during Savile's lifetime were not linked by police, with Savile as the same alleged perpetrator. The Crown Prosecution Service (CPS) said that the allegations made to Surrey Police between 2007 and 2009 could have resulted in prosecutions being undertaken.

Approximately 600 people had provided information at the time of the report's publication with 450 relating to Savile. This resulted in the formal recording of a total of 214 alleged criminal offences across 28 police forces. No attacks within the West Mercia area are included in the figures, and Gray expected the number of recorded offences to rise above the 214 considered by the report.

The report acknowledges that agencies such as the police and the NHS have "failed victims over decades". It describes Savile as "one of the UK's most prolific known sexual predators..." It concluded that "no clear evidence" was found that Savile operated in a paedophile ring, but investigations were continuing regarding the possibility of his being a member of an "informal network". The report suggests that Savile may not have been caught partly because, during the most prolific period, police investigations into such crimes at that time "lacked the specialist skills, knowledge and the collaborative approach of later years".

== Reception ==
We want this to mark a cultural shift so that if a child speaks out against someone, we take what they are saying seriously.

— John Cameron, head of child protection for the NSPCC, January 2013

The silver lining in all of this is that abusers might think twice about abusing children...

— Peter Saunders, founder, National Association for People Abused as Children, January 2013

Many people feel that for sexual offences, where it is "one person's word against another's" and there is no or little scientific or other evidence to support the allegation, no prosecution should be brought.

— Keir Starmer, Director of Public Prosecutions, January 2013

It has been suggested by The Guardian and The Sydney Morning Herald, that the report may have highlighted what could be systemic failure, because of the number of institutions identified. Yvette Cooper, Shadow Home Secretary requested that child protection experts conduct an "overarching review ... into why everyone failed to stop Savile and what should be done now". Jonathan Brown, writing in The Independent, opined that the report "revealed a man who used his celebrity status and outwardly well-intended works to gain access to and ultimately rape and sexually exploit hundreds of vulnerable young star-struck victims..."

Keir Starmer, Director of Public Prosecutions (DPP) apologised for "shortcomings" in the handling of abuse claims. He said that the allegations had been "treated ... with a degree of caution which was neither justified nor required" and described the report as marking a "watershed moment". Prosecutions were not brought by the CPS in three cases due to the victims not supporting police action. An apology for "missing the opportunity to prosecute Savile in 2009" was made by the CPS. Principal Legal Advisor to the DPP, Alison Levitt QC concluded that Savile could have been prosecuted during his lifetime for offences against at least three (of the four) victims. When interviewed under caution by Surrey police in 2009, Savile referred to the allegations as an "occupational hazard", saying to have previously sued five newspapers.

Former editor of The Daily Telegraph, Charles Moore noted that the report does not reveal the "extent of abuse" and that it "contains [no actual evidence], in a sense which a court would recognise." He commented that it "undermines justice" by "treat[ing] allegations as facts", noting the report's admission that "the information has not been corroborated" and viewing its contents as "not a contribution to the truth". He did not feel it right to overcompensate for previously dismissive attitudes to such an extent "that every accusation must be considered true". Referring to the 2000 BBC Two documentary When Louis Met... Jimmy, Moore noted Savile's response to claims of paedophilia: "How does anyone know whether I am or not?" He concluded that this specific question (and also concerning "future Saviles") is "not [made] easier to answer" by the "uninformative and self-righteous" report.

In March 2013, Her Majesty's Inspectorate of Constabulary reported that 214 of the complaints that had been made against Savile after his death would have been criminal offences if they had been reported at the time. Sixteen persons reported being raped by Savile under the age of 16 and four of those were under the age of ten. Thirteen others reported serious sexual abuse by Savile, including four under-ten-year-olds. Another ten reported being raped by Savile while over the age of sixteen.

Salon reported that because Savile could not face prosecution, the report offers the "closest thing to justice" for the alleged victims. Spiked criticised the report by describing it as "the peak of 'victim centred' justice" and lacking in objectivity. Academics in Social Work Studies at the University of Edinburgh have questioned the veracity of the report. Writing in "Moral Panics, Jimmy Savile and Social Work: a 21st century morality tale" that "Giving Victims a Voice is full of scare-mongering, exaggeration and elision, as allegations are presented as 'facts' and accusations become 'offences', held to be incontrovertibly true". The Lucy Faithfull Foundation stated that children must be better protected in the future. It also called for a national strategy to prevent such child sexual abuse. The BBC restated a "sincere apology to the victims", saying it was "appalled" at Savile's preying on its premises.

DJ and friend of Savile, Ray Teret was found guilty of seven rapes and 11 indecent assaults in December 2014; while Teret was cleared of aiding and abetting Savile to rape a 15-year-old girl, he was found guilty of raping the same complainant. A lawyer for 169 of Savile's alleged victims stated that Teret's guilty verdicts represent "the closest the victims of Jimmy Savile will get to a conviction against their attacker".

== Consequences ==
The departure of Newsnight's editor Peter Rippon in October 2012 was a precursor to a permanent replacement being sought by the BBC after the release of the report. In April 2013 ex-Metropolitan Police Commissioner Peter Spindler, who had previously led Operation Yewtree, stated that many more victims had probably not come forward. He estimated that this number could be two or three times the 450 accounted for in the report. An inquiry by West Yorkshire Police into Savile's "Friday Morning Club", which was regularly attended by officers, was reported on in February 2013. It was subsequently claimed that officers may have been groomed by Savile, partly as a result of his celebrity status. Investigations into further hospitals were underway during 2013, and a children's home in early 2014.

The NSPCC reported that the Savile scandal had resulted in an increase in overall reports of sexual abuse by 81%. This was measured by comparing the years immediately before and after broadcasting of the Exposure documentary. A subsequent NSPCC report was commissioned by Her Majesty's Inspectorate of Constabulary and published in January 2014. It reported on interviews with 26 individuals, a number of whom were abused in hospitals. Upon reporting abuse to staff at the time, they felt that their concerns were not treated sincerely.

== See also ==
- 2013 in the United Kingdom
- Dame Janet Smith Review (review of Savile's alleged offending on BBC premises)
- Post-assault treatment of sexual assault victims
