= Dan Davies (writer) =

British writer (born 1970)

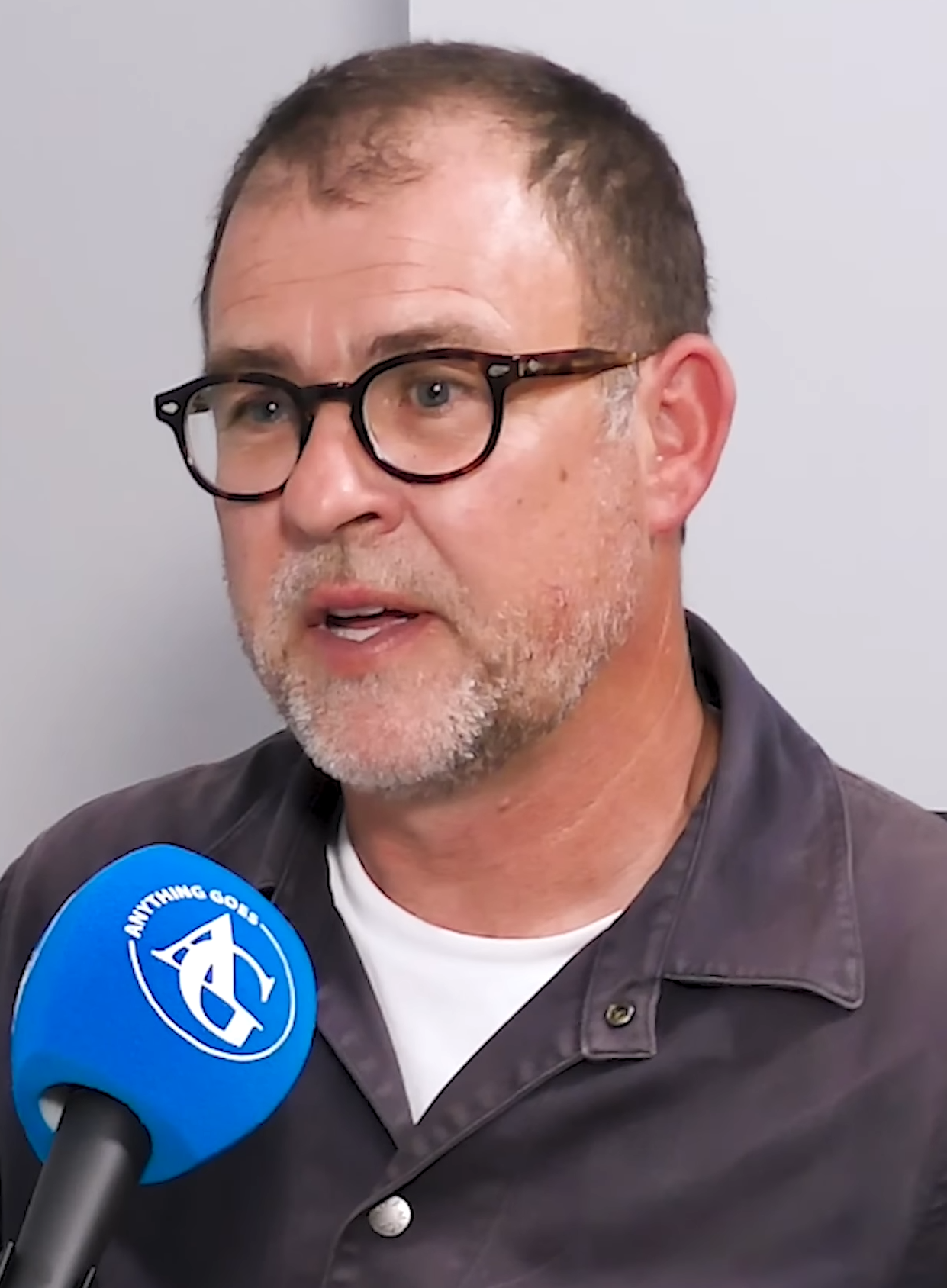
- Dan Davies in 2024
- Born: Daniel Davies; October 30, 1970 (age 55)
- Occupations: Journalist, editor, writer
- Notable work: In Plain Sight: The Life and Lies of Jimmy Savile
- Awards: Gordon Burn Prize (2015), CWA Gold Dagger for Non-Fiction (2015)

Daniel Davies (born 30 October 1970) is a British journalist, editor and writer.

== In Plain Sight: The Life and Lies of Jimmy Savile ==
Davies attended a recording of Jimmy Savile's BBC television show Jim'll Fix It at the age of nine, and noted "a suggestion of menace in [Savile's] manner". As a teenager, he read Savile's 1974 autobiography As it Happens around 1985 and/or 1986 and found that "the florid language he used to invoke its recurring themes of sex, power, death and self-righteousness served to reignite a flickering fear". He collected publications about Savile, and first interviewed him for a magazine in 2004. He went on to do a series of interviews in Savile's homes, in cafés, at the Athenaeum Club and elsewhere, the last interview being about a year before Savile's death in October 2011. Davies extended his researches to interview other people who had known Savile. He has said that, "The plan was to travel independently up the river of his story before finally confronting him with what I had found along the way." After Savile's death, and the public revelations of his abusive behaviour, Davies "had spoken with many more people than [he] would have been able to while [Savile] was alive." He wrote:

The boxes containing the many tapes, interview transcripts, newspaper cuttings and research articles that went into my book are taped shut and piled high in a shed. I don't want them in the house in which my three children live.

The book was published in 2014. The book formed part of the basis of the BBC television series The Reckoning, and the series includes many scenes where Davies, played by Mark Stanley, interviews Savile.

== Other work ==
Davies has written for publications including The Guardian, The Independent, The Mail on Sunday, The Economist, and Esquire, and has been editor of Esquire Weekly, acting and deputy editor of Esquire, deputy editor of Jack, and a features editor on The Mail on Sunday. In 2008, working for Esquire, he was short-listed for "Feature Writer of the Year" in the Press Gazette awards, and he has twice been shortlisted for "Magazine Editor of the Year" in the British Society of Magazine Editors' awards.

Davies' first book, One Love, was co-authored with Jamaican footballer Robbie Earle and described Jamaica's experience in the 1998 World Cup. It was reportedly described as "the best book of the World Cup".

== Awards ==
For his book on Jimmy Savile, Davies won the 2015 Gordon Burn Prize, which recognises "writers of non-fiction brave enough to recast characters and historical events to create a new and vivid reality", and the 2015 CWA Gold Dagger for Non-Fiction. He was short-listed for the 2015 Orwell Prize for political writing, and for the James Tait Black Memorial Prize.

== Selected publications ==
- Davies, Dan (2014). In Plain Sight: The Life and Lies of Jimmy Savile. Quercus. ISBN 978-1782067436.
- Earle, Robbie; Davies, Daniel (1998). One Love: The Story of Jamaica's Reggae Boyz and the 1998 World Cup. André Deutsch. ISBN 0233994432.
