= Whalebones Park =

Area of Chipping Barnet, London, England

Coordinates: 51.6524°N 0.215°W

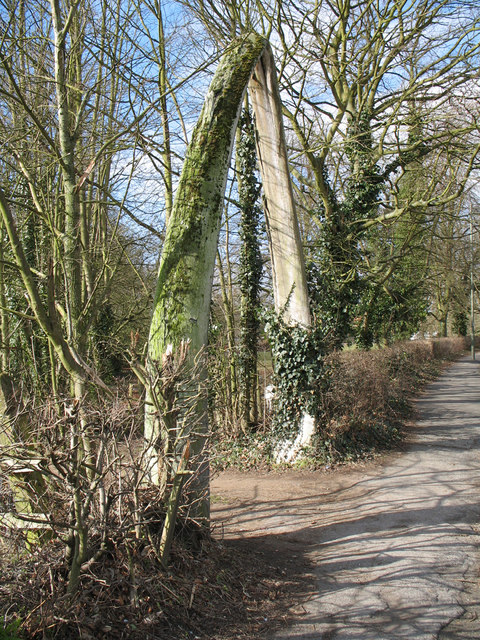
The jawbones of a whale, forming the entrance to Whalebones Park

Whalebones Park is a 14-acre area of fields and woods in Chipping Barnet, London Borough of Barnet, England, between Barnet Hospital and Wood Street. It is part of the Wood Street Conservation Area and is not open to the public.

It is home to the grade II listed house known as The Whalebones, which was built in the early 19th century, and a whale bone arch.

In 2015 it was reported that the area was being considered for development, leading to a campaign to save it as a public park. The initial planning proposal by Hill Residential to build 152 homes on the park was rejected in 2020, but a revised proposal was approved by Barnet Council in March 2024, with Sadiq Khan signing off on the plans in October 2024.
