= In Plain Sight (Davies book) =

2014 book by Dan Davies about Jimmy Savile

In Plain Sight: the Life and Lies of Jimmy Savile is a 2014 non-fiction book by Dan Davies, published by Quercus. It discusses Jimmy Savile and accusations of criminal activity made against him.

Journalist Carole Cadwalladr wrote that the book was "the first thoroughgoing attempt to try and make sense of Savile's life".

== Background ==
Davies attended a recording of Jimmy Savile's BBC television show Jim'll Fix It at the age of nine, and noted "a suggestion of menace in [Savile's] manner". As a teenager, he read Savile's 1974 autobiography As it Happens around 1985 and/or 1986 and found that "the florid language he used to invoke its recurring themes of sex, power, death and self-righteousness served to reignite a flickering fear". He collected publications about Savile, and first interviewed him for a magazine in 2004. He went on to do a series of interviews in Savile's homes, in cafés, at the Athenaeum Club and elsewhere, the last interview being about a year before Savile's death in October 2011. Davies extended his researches to interview other people who had known Savile. He has said that, "The plan was to travel independently up the river of his story before finally confronting him with what I had found along the way." After Savile's death, and the public revelations of his abusive behaviour, Davies "had spoken with many more people than [he] would have been able to while [Savile] was alive." He wrote:

The boxes containing the many tapes, interview transcripts, newspaper cuttings and research articles that went into my book are taped shut and piled high in a shed. I don't want them in the house in which my three children live.

The book was published in 2014. The book formed part of the basis of the BBC television series The Reckoning, and the series includes many scenes where Davies, played by Mark Stanley, interviews Savile.

== Contents ==
In The Daily Telegraph, Alwyn Turner stated that in the book, the main subject is shown to be "vicious and arrogant" and having other negative characteristics. Cadwalladr stated that Savile is shown to be "impenetrable, unknowable" in the work.

== Reception ==
Cadwalladr wrote that the book is "a riveting read".

David Hare wrote a positive review in The Guardian, stating that the author "scarcely puts a foot wrong" and states that just a few "errors of tone" occur.

Rachel Cooke wrote in The New Statesman that the fact that Davies had synthesized countless journalistic works was the man's "great achievement", and she also praised the method that the author shows specifics, especially on the subject; overall, Cooke stated that the author "has done an exemplary job."

Turner stated that the work is "a compulsive, colourful and chilling read, without a hint of sensationalism." According to Turner, the book lacks an examination of "a wider problem" in society and a "culture of contamination" and instead has excessive focus on Saville himself; according to Turner, this is "the fundamental flaw in this book."

In 2015 the author received the Gordon Burn Prize due to the publication of this work.
