= Janet Smith (judge) =

British judge (born 1940)

Dame Janet Hilary Smith, DBE, PC (born 29 November 1940), styled The Rt Hon. Lady Justice Smith, is an English barrister and former High Court Judge and President of the Council of The Inns of Court. She was the judge who prepared The Shipman Inquiry (a report on the activities of the British serial killer Harold Shipman) and the Dame Janet Smith Review (a report on the activities of the British alleged sex offender Jimmy Savile).

On 21 November 2002, Smith became the fourth woman to be promoted to the Court of Appeal, but she has since retired from that role. She is a Convenor of the cross-party political movement More United.

== Personal life ==
Smith was born in Stockport, Cheshire, and attended Bolton School. She married, before being called to the Bar in 1972. In February 2013 she was assessed as one of the 100 most powerful women in the United Kingdom by Woman's Hour on BBC Radio 4.

== Career ==
=== Early career ===
She practised as a barrister for twenty years in Manchester, specialising in personal injury and clinical negligence cases. After being appointed QC in 1986, she was appointed by Lancashire County Council in 1991 to hold a public inquiry into reported abuse of autistic children at Scotforth House in Lancaster. She was appointed a High Court judge in 1992 (and received the customary appointment as a Dame Commander of the Order of the British Empire). Ann Ebsworth had been the first woman judge on the Queens Bench in 1992 and Smith and Heather Steel soon joined her. As a High Court judge, she was involved in the trials of many notable homicide cases.

=== Shipman Inquiry ===
Smith prepared The Shipman Inquiry, the report on the activities of the British serial killer Harold Shipman. The results of her year-long inquiry were published on 19 July 2002, and concluded that Shipman, jailed for life in January 2000 for 15 murders committed between 1995 and 1998, had murdered at least 215 patients since March 1975, also stating that there was a real suspicion that he had murdered as many as 260 people. Smith never found any real motive for Shipman's killings but said, "It is possible that he was addicted to killing. He betrayed his patients' trust in a way and to the extent that I believe is unparalleled in history."

=== Court of Appeal ===
On 21 November 2002, Smith became the fourth woman to be promoted to the Court of Appeal, following Dame Elizabeth Butler-Sloss (now Baroness Butler-Sloss, 1988), Dame Brenda Hale (now Baroness Hale of Richmond, 1999) and Dame Mary Arden (2000). In January 2003, she was appointed Chancellor of Manchester Metropolitan University, a position she held until 2009. After retiring from the Court of Appeal, in June 2011 Smith was appointed to succeed Lord Brennan QC as the independent assessor for miscarriages of justice compensation for England and Wales. In January 2012 she became Treasurer of Lincoln's Inn.

=== Savile Inquiry ===
On 11 October 2012, she was appointed by the BBC to lead an inquiry into the Jimmy Savile sexual abuse scandal. She called for evidence from people who were the subject of inappropriate sexual conduct by Savile on BBC premises, or on location for the BBC; people who knew of or suspected such conduct; anyone who raised concerns about Savile's conduct within the BBC; people who worked for or with Savile on programmes at the BBC between about 1964 and 2007, or who were familiar with "the culture or practices of the BBC during that time insofar as they may have been relevant to preventing or enabling the sexual abuse of children, young people or teenagers"; and people who held senior positions at the BBC who may have relevant information. The report, the Dame Janet Smith Review, was published on 25 February 2016.

== Arms ==
Coat of arms of Janet Smith
| Notes Displayed on the wall of Lincoln's Inn Great Hall. |
