= Peter Jaconelli =

British mayor and businessman (1925–1999)

- Born: 25 November 1925; Glasgow, Scotland
- Died: 15 May 1999 (aged 73)
- Occupations: Business magnate; councillor
- Political party: Conservative

Peter Jaconelli (25 November 1925 – 15 May 1999), was a business magnate, and mayor of Scarborough, North Yorkshire from 1971–1972. He was posthumously implicated in the Jimmy Savile sexual abuse scandal.

== Life ==
Jaconelli was born in Glasgow on 25 November 1925 His father, Richard, was head of a company (founded in 1833 by his Italian great grandfather) manufacturing and selling ice cream which relocated to Scarborough with the family in 1933. Here the seven-year-old Jaconelli began selling, something he continued to do even when he became chief executive and even after retiring in 1991, being known as the King of the Cornets. When in charge of the company he expanded it from a local company to a national catering one, supplying both ice-creams and frozen desserts to restaurants. At its peak in the 1990s it supplied 2.5 million litres of frozen desserts per year, including exports to Spain, Portugal and the Middle East.

Outside business, he was a Conservative local councillor becoming mayor of Scarborough for 1971–1972 and made Honorary Alderman of the Borough of Scarborough in 1996. He was also chairman of the North Yorkshire County Council planning committee, and on a number of other local government committees.

On 27 April 1972 he ate 500 oysters in 48.07 minutes to establish a Guinness World Record.

He died on 15 May 1999 and was buried in Woodlands Cemetery, Scarborough. In 2011 his close friend Jimmy Savile was buried nearby.

== Sexual abuse scandal ==
In 2014, it was revealed that Jaconelli had been charged with indecent assault in 1972 and with Savile was suspected of being part of a paedophile ring which had operated in Scarborough. The Crown Prosecution Service (CPS) confirmed it had a case file related to Jaconelli but they were unable to confirm whether the charge was dropped, whether a prosecution was authorised, or which police force was responsible for the investigation.

North Yorkshire Police launched Operation Hibiscus in February 2014 after an ITV documentary detailed abuse allegations involving Jaconelli and Savile. That December, the force issued an apology for failing to prosecute Jaconelli during his lifetime. They stated that they received 32 complaints regarding Jaconelli and that there would have been sufficient evidence to submit the case to the CPS if he were alive.

Savile's headstone had already been removed, and Jaconelli's was removed shortly after North Yorkshire Police's announcement. The title of Honorary Alderman was posthumously removed in 2013.

Jaconelli was played by Peter Wight in The Reckoning (2023), a miniseries about Savile's crimes broadcast on the BBC.
