= The Hydrant Programme =

UK policing service for child protection and abuse

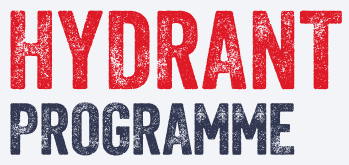
- Common name: Hydrant

Agency overview
- Preceding agency: Operation Hydrant

Jurisdictional structure
- National agency: United Kingdom
- Operations jurisdiction: United Kingdom
- General nature: Civilian police

Operational structure
- Overseen by: National Police Chiefs' Council
- Headquarters: New Scotland Yard, London, England
- Agency executives: Richard Fewkes; Becky Riggs, Assistant Chief Constable

Website
- https://www.hydrantprogramme.co.uk

The Hydrant Programme (or Hydrant) is a United Kingdom policing policy and support service formed in August 2022 as part of the National Police Chiefs' Council (NPCC), funded by the Home Office. It provides analysis, information, research and learning in relation to sexual abuse, as well as facilitating communications between police forces and other organisations across the UK dealing with sex crime and child protection. The London Metropolitan Police Service are the host force for the programme.

The service was originally created by the NPCC as Operation Hydrant in June 2014. This provided co-ordination, support and guidance to the police after it became apparent that forces around the country were investigating a significant number of potentially overlapping allegations of past child sexual offenses following the Jimmy Savile sexual abuse scandal. It dealt primarily with cases concerning persons of public prominence, or with offences which took place within institutional settings such as hospitals, care homes and schools. The service did not carry out individual investigations, as these were conducted by the relevant local police forces.

== History of Operation Hydrant and Winter Key ==
In late 2012, it emerged that Jimmy Savile, a British media personality who had died the previous year, had sexually abused hundreds of people throughout his life, mostly children but some as old as 75, and mostly female. He had been well known in the United Kingdom for his eccentric image and was generally respected for his charitable work, which associated him with the British monarchy and other individuals of personal power.

In response to the large increase of complainants coming forward in the wake of the Savile scandal, and to avoid the risk of investigators looking at the same individuals and institutions, the National Police Chiefs' Council (NPCC) launched Operation Hydrant in June 2014. This was a new operation giving support and guidance to forces dealing with the complex cases involved. Hydrant formed the oversight and coordination of child sexual abuse investigations concerning persons of public prominence, or of offences which took place within institutional settings.

In June 2015 Operation Winter Key was set up by the Metropolitan Police (Met), absorbing earlier Met operations including Operation Yewtree and Operation Fairbank. Allegations referred to the Met by Operation Hydrant were handled by Winter Key. By March 2019 Winter Key had cost £20 million. By February 2020, some 7,000 suspects had been identified, with 11,346 allegations of assaults from 9,343 victims. Some allegations dated back to the 1940s and all concerned child sexual abuse.

The investigations produced the following outcomes:

No further action by police	5,284
Conviction in court	4,024
No further action by CPS	1,313
Acquittal in court	719
Caution	10
Total	11,346

Allegations where no further action was taken were broken down into the following percentages:

Suspect deceased	36%
Suspect not identified/traced	22%
Victim did not support police action	17%
Insufficient detail/evidence	9%

Commenting on what the police had discovered, the head of Operation Hydrant, Chief Constable Simon Bailey said: "[as a society] we are going to have to recognise and accept that during the 1970s and 1980s in particular, there was widespread sexual abuse of children taking place", adding that the vast majority of cases were never reported due to lack of victims' faith in the authorities, and the abuse of power. Regarding the impact of the abuse he said, "Some could not cope. ... Some victims committed suicide. Some coped, some are in the mental care system. The horrors bestowed on these children are horrific."

Gabrielle Shaw of the National Association for People Abused in Childhood said, "We know from what victims and survivors tell us that being able to report what happened to the police is healing for many people, sometimes even when a case cannot be pursued. Thirty-five percent of offenders brought to justice for non-recent abuse is very encouraging."

== See also ==
- Operation Yewtree
- Jimmy Savile sexual abuse scandal
