= The Reckoning (2023 TV series) =

British crime drama

- Genre: Docudrama
- Based on: In Plain Sight: The Life and Lies of Jimmy Savile by Dan Davies
- Written by: Neil McKay
- Directed by: Sandra Goldbacher; David Blair
- Starring: Steve Coogan
- Composer: Niall Byrne
- Country of origin: United Kingdom
- Original language: English
- No. of episodes: 4

Production
- Executive producers: Neil McKay; Jeff Pope
- Producer: Clare Shepherd
- Production locations: England; Wales
- Production company: ITV Studios

Original release
- Network: BBC One
- Release: 9 October – 17 October 2023

The Reckoning is a British docudrama television miniseries that depicts the career and sexual crimes of British media personality Jimmy Savile, portrayed by Steve Coogan, from the early 1960s to his death in 2011. It is based in part on the book In Plain Sight: the Life and Lies of Jimmy Savile by Dan Davies.

The series sparked controversy during its production and was first broadcast on BBC One in October 2023. The Reckoning received mixed reviews, with praise for Coogan's portrayal of Savile.

== Premise ==
The series recounts the career and sexual offences of Jimmy Savile, who was one of the best-known radio and television personalities in Britain during his life, and whose crimes emerged after his death. Four real-life survivors of Savile's abuse speak at the start and end of some of the episodes. Each episode has scenes taking place in the last years of Savile's life, primarily where writer Dan Davies, who is researching Savile for his book, interviews him in various locations.

== Cast ==
- Steve Coogan as Jimmy Savile
- Gemma Jones as Agnes Savile
- Mark Stanley as Dan Davies
- Robert Emms as Ray Teret
- Michael Jibson as Bill Cotton
- Julian Rhind-Tutt as Johnnie Stewart
- Faye McKeever as Alison
- Mark Lewis Jones as Charles Hullighan
- Siobhan Finneran as Beryl Hullighan
- Peter Wight as Peter Jaconelli
- Fenella Woolgar as Margaret Thatcher
- Neil Pearson as Eric Morley

== Episodes ==
No.	Episode	Directed by	Written by	Original release date	BBC One broadcast	UK viewers (millions)
1	Episode 1	Sandra Goldbacher; David Blair	Neil McKay	9 October 2023	9 October 2023	6.17
Writer Dan Davies interviews media personality Jimmy Savile to recount the story of his life. In the early 1960s, Savile is living in Salford with his friend Ray Teret. As a DJ, Savile runs sell-out dances for young people in the dance halls of Leeds and Manchester, and volunteers at Leeds General Infirmary – but also exploits these positions by sexually abusing people. He is invited to host a new BBC series, Top of the Pops, while victims of his abuse watch in horror.
2	Episode 2	Sandra Goldbacher; David Blair	Neil McKay	9 October 2023	10 October 2023	5.07
Top of the Pops makes Savile a household name. His growing influence within the BBC and at a range of institutions enables him to act with apparent impunity. After he receives an OBE, his mother, who suspects a dark side to her son, dies in 1972, and his behaviour continues.
3	Episode 3	Sandra Goldbacher; David Blair	Neil McKay	9 October 2023	16 October 2023	5.15
At the peak of his fame and influence, Savile hosts Jim'll Fix It on BBC One. The series makes him a regular feature in households across Britain. Telling a priest about his crimes, he is told that he should turn himself in. He further cements his position of power by spearheading a fundraising campaign for Stoke Mandeville Hospital, giving him unprecedented political access, allowing him to hide in plain sight and silence the victims of his crimes. Savile is knighted.
4	Episode 4	Sandra Goldbacher; David Blair	Neil McKay	9 October 2023	17 October 2023	4.86
In the early 2000s, Savile attempts to protect his legacy and continues to hide in plain sight. In 2006, he is angry when his appearance on the final edition of Top of the Pops is very short. He turns to drinking brandy. In 2011, Savile falls with ill health and suffering from pneumonia. Before leaving hospital, he refuses to admit to any sins when read his last rites, opting to take his chances in death as he has done in life. Savile dies alone in his Leeds flat, his fingers crossed. The following year, his crimes are exposed, tarnishing his reputation.

== Production ==
The production was announced in October 2020, and was criticised before filming was underway. Richard Morrison, writing in The Times, stated that, as it was commissioned by the BBC, it felt "less an act of contrition than of exploitation." Pragya Argawal, writing in The Independent, stated:

It also feels insidiously callous and thoughtless that an organisation that played a role in glorifying a sex offender and profiting from him [the BBC], while covering up his actions for many decades, are once again capitalising on his "brand" and the fascination that viewers have with monsters and true crime.

Ben Lawrence, writing in The Daily Telegraph, said the victims of Savile's crimes deserved "better than the kneejerk hysteria that has surfaced about The Reckoning", and that "... the question is not whether we should make a drama like The Reckoning, but how we do so."

In September 2021, it was announced that Steve Coogan had been cast as Jimmy Savile. (Note: Coogan previously voiced Savile on the satirical puppet show Spitting Image.) (Note: After the series broadcast, it was later emerged that Coogan had met Savile in real life.) Coogan said the decision to play Savile was "not one I took lightly", but felt that writer Neil McKay's script "tackled a horrific story which – however harrowing – needs to be told". Work on the production started in early October 2021, and included filming location scenes in North-West England and North Wales. During production, Coogan met with real life survivors of Savile's abuse, and reassured them when they saw him in character. Coogan asked the filmmakers to tone down a scene where Savile is implied to molest an elderly woman's dead body in a morgue, finding it too uncomfortable. Coogan, who later explained he had his head shaved for months during production, said that he was so uncomfortable playing Savile that he eventually was "pleased" when production finished.

In light of the controversy surrounding the series and the events regarding the death of Queen Elizabeth II, the drama was first expected to be broadcast by the BBC in 2022, before being pushed back to 2024. A source said, “The four-part drama is being edited in such a meticulous and careful way, so as not to create more pain and suffering for Savile’s victims.” It was later brought forward to 2023. The series went to air on BBC One from 9 October, with all episodes available on iPlayer from the same date. Coogan reportedly cancelled a string of book signings as Alan Partridge during the broadcast.

The programme was presented as being partly fictionalised, with some characters and events created for dramatic purposes. Several scenes have been described in the Telegraph as embellished or false. In a subplot in Episode 2, Savile, after hosting an edition of Top of the Pops, rapes a young Asian girl who subsequently kills herself with an overdose of pills. This incident is based on the suicide in 1971 of 15-year-old Claire McAlpine, who claimed to have been sexually abused by two disc jockeys: it is unclear whether Savile was one of her abusers. One of McAlpine’s friends said she was upset about the filmmakers' decision not to use her real name, and Mark Williams-Thomas criticised the casting of the character's race from white to Asian. Williams-Thomas was criticised for his comments about the character's race. The final scene depicting Savile's 84-year old body in his squalid Leeds flat, its fingers crossed, is based on the claim that his fingers were crossed when he was found dead.

== Critical reception ==
The Reckoning received mixed reviews from television critics, with most praising Coogan's performance. On the review aggregator website Rotten Tomatoes, 61% of 18 critics' reviews are positive, with an average rating of 6.80/10. The website's consensus reads: "Featuring an absolutely chilling performance by Steve Coogan, The Reckoning wallows in a sordid legacy where there's scant closure to be had."

In The Guardian, Lucy Mangan wrote that Coogan was "chillingly brilliant as Jimmy Savile", but that "to watch The Reckoning is to come away depressed but unenlightened". The series was criticised as gratuitous and for being shown on the BBC, which was accused of having shielded Savile in his lifetime. John Nugent of Empire gave the series three out of five stars, describing it as a "tough watch, of course, made with obvious conscientiousness, centred around a deeply disturbing central performance from Steve Coogan. Whether this is the appropriate form of reckoning for such inconceivable crimes, however, should be up for debate." Louis Theroux (who had interviewed Savile in 2000), when asked on whether he thought the series was in "bad taste", said that he was "struck" by the series' attempt "to scrupulously adhere to the facts". He also praised Coogan's performance.

Coogan was nominated for the British Academy Television Award for Best Actor in 2024.

== See also ==
- Jimmy Savile: A British Horror Story
