= Chris Denning =

English radio presenter and convicted sex offender (1941–2022)

- Born: Christopher David Denning; 10 May 1941; Hayes, Middlesex, England
- Died: 24 June 2022 (aged 81); Bedford, England
- Occupation: Radio presenter
- Criminal charges: Sex offences

Christopher David Denning (10 May 1941 – 24 June 2022) was an English radio presenter and sex offender. His career effectively ended when he was convicted of sexual offences in 1974. He was imprisoned several times in the United Kingdom, Czechia and Slovakia between 1985 and his death in custody in 2022.

== Early life ==
Christopher David Denning was born in Hayes, Middlesex on 10 May 1941. He grew up in Cowley, Oxford, the only child of middle-class parents. He has said that he was a rent boy from the age of 13 and remained so until the age of 18.

== Radio career ==
His first radio experience was on a short-wave station in the United States as a teenager before travelling to Kenya to work on British Forces Network. He then returned to the UK in time to become the first announcer heard on BBC2 when it began broadcasting in 1964. He worked for Radio Luxembourg and Radio London before presenting the Saturday afternoon programme Where It's At with Kenny Everett (produced by Johnny Beerling) on the BBC Light Programme. He then became one of the original DJs on BBC Radio 1, where he continued presenting Where It's At, had his own weekly show and deputised as necessary for Tony Blackburn on the latter's breakfast show. Denning was gay, and has said that he was 'out' when he was working at Radio 1.

Denning left Radio 1 in 1969 after facing accusations that his job there came into conflict with his new promotional job at Decca Records, which the BBC had initially agreed to with provisos. He worked for Decca for two years. He then became the number two producer at Bell Records and was involved in developing the careers of the Bay City Rollers and Gary Glitter.

After his employment with radio stations and record companies, he ran his own music and video production business, and was part of a 1997 Radio One reunion with Terry Wogan and Tony Blackburn.

== Legal history ==
In 1959, Denning was jailed in Germany for distributing pornographic images.

Denning's first conviction for gross indecency and indecent assault was in 1974 when he was convicted at the Old Bailey, although he was not imprisoned. Before his conviction, Denning had been working for Jonathan King's newly founded UK Records, but King sacked him after the guilty verdict.

During the 1970s, Denning was part of a group of child sex offenders based around a disco for young people called the Walton Hop. Other participants included Tam Paton, manager of the Bay City Rollers (convicted of child sex offences in 1982), and Jonathan King. All became suspects in Surrey Police's Operation Arundel, an investigation focusing on sex offenders, which ultimately led to convictions against King and Denning.

In 1985, he was imprisoned for 18 months for gross indecency with a child, and in 1988 for three years for indecent assault on a 13-year-old boy and possession of indecent photographs. In March 1996, he was imprisoned for ten weeks for publishing indecent photographs. The following year he was held in Pankrác Prison in Prague to await his trial in 2000, which convicted him of abusing seven boys aged under 15. He was released in 2001.

After his release, he was wanted for questioning by Surrey Police, but an extradition attempt by British authorities in the Prague City Court failed because the alleged offences fell outside of the Czech Republic's statute of limitation of five years, but Denning was ordered to leave the country "indefinitely". He was arrested in August 2005 at Heathrow Airport after returning to Britain from Austria. He admitted to five charges of the indecent assault of boys aged under 16 years of age, dating back to the 1970s and 1980s: he was convicted the following February and imprisoned for four years. Meanwhile, a European arrest warrant was issued in December 2007.

In 2008, he was extradited from Britain to Slovakia, where he was jailed in October for five years for producing child pornography. The offences in Slovakia dated back to 2002 and 2003. He had been briefly held in custody in Bratislava during 2004 following a search of his house, but then quickly left the country.

In June 2013, he was arrested in east London as part of Operation Yewtree, an investigation into sexual abuse. He was re-arrested and bailed out in September of that year. The allegations made against Denning were not part of those relating to Jimmy Savile. In May 2014, as a result of the investigation, he was charged with 41 sex offences. In August 2014, Denning admitted to 29 of the charges in relation to the offences committed against boys. In November at Southwark Crown Court, he pleaded guilty to a further eleven charges. In all, he pleaded guilty to 40 sexual offences committed in the period 1967 to 1987 relating to 26 male victims, the youngest of whom was 9 at the time of the offence. In December 2014, Judge Alistair McCreath sentenced him to 13 years in prison.

Denning was charged with six offences stemming from the Operation Ravine investigation on 7 June 2016. On 22 August 2016, Denning pleaded guilty to 21 sex offences between 1969 and 1986, against 11 boys, the youngest of whom was 8. At Southwark Crown Court on 7 October 2016, Judge Alistair McCreath sentenced Denning to another 13 years in prison for these additional offences, running from the day of the court hearing.

On 7 December 2017, Denning pleaded not guilty to two counts of indecent assault and one of taking indecent photos of a child between March 1979 and March 1981. His trial was due to start on 11 June 2018, but the charges were dropped on 13 June.

== Death ==
Denning died while in prison custody in Bedford Hospital on 24 June 2022, as a result of a bone infection caused by diabetes. He was 81 years old. His death was not reported publicly until October 2023. The Prisons and Probation Ombudsman, which investigates deaths in prison custody, found that "when clinical readings first showed that Mr Denning needed emergency care, he was not transferred to hospital for treatment".
