= The Shipman Inquiry =

UK serial killer investigation

The Shipman Inquiry was the report produced by a British governmental investigation into the activities of general practitioner and serial killer Harold Shipman. Shipman was arrested in September 1998 and the inquiry commenced shortly after he was found guilty of 15 murders in January 2000. It released its findings in various stages, with its sixth and final report being released on 27 January 2005 – by which time Shipman had died by suicide in prison. It was chaired by Dame Janet Smith DBE.

While Shipman was convicted of 15 murders, the inquiry in July 2002 established that he had killed at least 284 people, and may have killed as many as 300, although the true number could be even higher. The inquiry took approximately 2,500 witness statements and analysed approximately 270,000 pages of evidence. In total the six reports ran to 5,000 pages and the investigation cost £21 million. In May 2001, it was announced that the inquiry would be investigating a total of 618 deaths between 1974 and 1998.

== Remit and makeup of inquiry ==
On 1 February 2000, the Secretary of State for Health, Alan Milburn, announced that an independent private inquiry would take place into Shipman's activities. It would decide what "changes to current systems should be made in order to safeguard patients in the future". Its findings would be made public, though it would be held in private. It was to be chaired by Lord Laming of Tewin.

It began work on 10 March and was to produce a report by September 2000. Many families of the victims along with certain sections of the British media called for a Judicial Review of the High Court. It found in their favour and recommended that the inquiry be held in public. The Secretary of State for Health agreed, and in September 2000 announced that the inquiry would be held under the terms of the Tribunals of Inquiry (Evidence) Act 1921. This was then ratified by both Houses of Parliament in January 2001. Lord Laming was replaced by Smith. Dr Aneez Esmail was the medical adviser to the inquiry. Smith initially hoped to finish her inquiries by "Spring of 2003". The inquiry was held in the Town Hall in Manchester with proceedings relayed by closed-circuit television to the public library in Hyde, where Shipman had lived, for the town's inhabitants to follow it more easily.

The Administration of the Inquiry was managed by Henry Palin, who was supported by Michael Taylor and later Mark Dillon. Oonagh McIntosh was the Secretary to the Inquiry.

There were four main areas investigated:

1. the extent of Shipman's unlawful activities
2. the actions of the statutory bodies and other organisations concerned in the procedures and investigations which followed the deaths of Shipman's patients
3. the performance of the statutory bodies and other organisations with responsibility for monitoring primary care provision and the use of controlled drugs
4. what steps should be taken to protect patients in the future

== Findings ==
The inquiry found major flaws in the processes of death registration, prescription of drugs and monitoring of doctors. In all, including the 15 deaths Shipman was convicted of, it concluded that Shipman had killed 250 patients, starting in 1971 while he was working in Pontefract General Infirmary. Though the majority of his victims were elderly, there was a strong suspicion that he had killed one patient aged four.

The report rejected claims by a prisoner, John Harkin, who knew Shipman while he was in Preston prison, that Shipman had confessed to 508 deaths.

== Recommendations ==
The report made a number of recommendations for the reform of various British systems. It called for coroners to be better trained and underlined that better controls on the use of schedule 2, 3 and 4 drugs by doctors and pharmacists were needed.

It also recommended that fundamental changes be implemented in the way that doctors are overseen. Specifically, it said, the General Medical Council "was an organisation designed to look after the interests of doctors, not patients".

== Post-inquiry situation ==
In 2008, a University of Dundee investigation found that even if the monitoring of patients' deaths was introduced as the inquiry suggested, it would still take 30 deaths to detect a murderous trend.

== See also ==
- John Bodkin Adams — British doctor and suspected serial killer who "possibly provided the role model for Shipman".
- Dame Janet Smith Review (Smith's review into Jimmy Savile's alleged offending at the BBC)
