= Wilfred De'Ath =

British journalist and writer (1937–2020)

Wilfred De'Ath (/diˈɑːt/; 28 July 1937 – 19 February 2020) was a British author and journalist who worked for the BBC as a radio producer in the 1960s and 1970s and wrote a column in The Oldie.

== Early life ==
De'Ath grew up in Elstree, Hertfordshire, England, in a mixed German–British family as his mother was German. De'Ath said his German heritage was a problem during and after World War II. He was educated at Queen Elizabeth's, Barnet, and Oriel College, Oxford. Between 1963 and 1977, he was married and had two children, Emma and Charles. He lived in Oxford.

== BBC career ==
De'Ath started working for BBC Radio as a producer in 1960 after his graduation. During this period, he produced and interviewed public figures such as Auberon Waugh, Judi Dench, John Wells, Caryl Churchill and Daphne du Maurier. In 1965, he interviewed John Lennon. As the producer of Midweek in 1964, he arranged for the broadcast of "The Maurice Cole Quarter of an Hour Show" – the first radio appearance of Kenny Everett. In the filmed biography of Everett – Best Possible Taste: The Kenny Everett Story — the part of De'Ath was played by actor James Wilby. In the 1960s, De'Ath also produced Teen Scene for BBC Radio and worked with Jimmy Savile.

In the 1970s, he reported on the counterculture for the BBC Radio 4. He first investigated it in London districts like Notting Hill, presenting it as an American import. He then went to San Francisco, home of the Hippie movement, and then finally returned to Britain to report on experiments in communal living.

De'Ath's career at the BBC ended after he wrote an article for the Hampstead and Highgate Express in which he described nine colleagues as "intellectual pygmies". They brought a libel suit which ended up costing him £4,500 (equivalent to £24,592 in 2025), which was all the money he had at the time; because he had just separated from his wife he became homeless..

== Post-BBC era ==
Sometime after his marriage ended, De'Ath lived as a vagrant in France, and since 1993, De'Ath appeared in court over 30 times and was sent primarily by remand to prison between four and six times for petty thefts, by his own admission. He also wrote about staying in expensive hotels for long periods of time without paying. The experiences of these years provided De'Ath with both his public persona, as both a "gentleman" and a "scrounger", and the material for his column in The Oldie. He also wrote his column from the perspective of a prisoner.

On 11 November 2012, De'Ath was arrested as part of Operation Yewtree in an alleged connection with the Jimmy Savile–BBC sex scandal. The complainant withdrew her statement, and the Crown Prosecution Service decided that he would not be prosecuted. After De'Ath was told that he would not face any charges, he said that the police action had been "overzealous".

== Bibliography ==
He wrote the following books:

- Barbara Castle: A portrait from life, 1970
- Just Me and Nobody Else [The Autobiography of an Anonymous Delinquent, as Related to W. De'Ath], 1966
- Museums are all about life, 1970
- Down and Out: The Collected Writings of The Oldie Columnist Wilfred De'Ath, 2003, ISBN 0233000569

First edited collection of the columns of Wilfred De'Ath, regular columnist with monthly mag the "Oldie" with an introduction by Melvyn Bragg

- De'Ath, Wilfred (2008), Uncommon Criminal, Timewell Press, ISBN 978-1857252248, "Born in 1937, Wilfred De'Ath's outwardly conventional early life in suburban London was dominated by the overpowering puritanism and fanatical patriotism of his mother, the daughter of a German pastor."
