= Ray Teret =

English disc jockey and convicted sex offender (1941–2021)

- Born: Raymond Teret; 24 October 1941; Salisbury, Wiltshire, England
- Died: 5 May 2021 (aged 79); HMP Manchester, England
- Criminal charges: Seven counts of rape, eleven counts of indecent assault
- Penalty: 25 years in prison
- Musical career
- Occupation: Disc jockey
- Years active: 1960s–2012

Raymond Teret (24 October 1941 – 5 May 2021) was an English radio disc jockey and convicted sex offender.

Teret was closely associated with fellow DJ Jimmy Savile in the early 1960s, sharing a flat with him and working as Savile's support DJ, assistant and chauffeur. He joined Radio Caroline North in the mid-1960s. He later worked in a series of DJ- and media-related work, mainly on Piccadilly Radio in Manchester and Signal Radio in Stoke-on-Trent.

In December 2014, two years after Savile was posthumously exposed as a paedophile, Teret was convicted of rape and indecent assault, after having been already convicted of a similar count in 1999, and was sentenced to 25 years in prison. He died in prison in 2021, having served just over six years of his sentence.

== Early life ==
Teret was born in Salisbury, Wiltshire. He grew up in Wythenshawe, attending Burnage Grammar School, gaining six O-levels.

== Career ==
He began work as a warehouse clerk, apprentice heating engineer and waiter at the Ritz Ballroom in Manchester. In the early 1960s, Teret met Jimmy Savile after winning the Savile-run singing contest at the Palace Theatre in Manchester. The two men later shared a flat at 301 Great Clowes Street in Broughton, Salford, with Teret becoming Savile's support DJ, assistant and chauffeur.

Teret joined Radio Caroline North in the mid-1960s, where he became known as "Ugly" Ray Teret. His theme music was "Jungle Fever" by the Tornados, and he also used "The Ugly Bug Ball" by Burl Ives. After leaving Radio Caroline North in 1966, two years before it closed down, Teret worked in a series of DJ- and media-related work, mainly on Piccadilly Radio in Manchester and Signal Radio in Stoke-on-Trent.

== Sexual assaults ==
In 1999, Teret was found guilty of unlawful sex with a 15-year-old girl.

On 9 November 2012, Teret was arrested at his home on Woodlands Road in Altrincham by Greater Manchester Police, one of two arrests made in connection with an allegation of historic rape. The offences are alleged to have taken place in Trafford in the 1960s and 1970s against three women who were then children. The arrests were not part of Operation Yewtree, the investigation into the offences committed by Savile and others, though Teret had been a close associate of Savile.

In October 2014, Teret appeared at Minshull Street Crown Court accused of more than 30 offences of sexual abuse, including 18 charges of rape, some dating back to the 1960s. One of the charges related to an alleged offence committed by Teret and Savile together. Two other men, William Harper and Alan Ledger, were also charged, and were tried alongside Teret. All three men denied all the charges. In December, Teret was found guilty of seven charges of rape and eleven charges of indecent assault, with one victim aged only 12. The other two defendants were found not guilty of all charges, and Teret was acquitted of assisting Savile to rape an alleged victim, but was found guilty of raping the same complainant himself.

On 11 December 2014, Mr Justice Baker sentenced Teret to 25 years in prison. The judge said that it was likely that most, if not all, of his remaining years would be spent in prison, and that had Teret been convicted nearer the time of the offences, a life sentence would have been appropriate. A lawyer for 169 of Savile's alleged victims stated that Teret's conviction represents "the closest the victims of Jimmy Savile will get to a conviction against their attacker".

On 17 May 2015, a television programme detailing the investigation into the claims of historic sexual abuse against Teret was broadcast on BBC Two. The Detectives depicted investigators discovering extensive graffiti dating to the 1960s and 1970s behind the wallpaper in Teret's former apartment. The names, telephone numbers and other data in the graffiti both confirmed the testimony of victims and contradicted Teret's testimony that he did not know the victims.

== Death ==
Teret died in prison in Manchester on 5 May 2021.

Teret was played by Robert Emms in The Reckoning, a BBC miniseries about Jimmy Savile.
