= Operation Yewtree =

British police investigation against Jimmy Savile and others

- Geographical locations of the reported offences according to Giving Victims a Voice
- Operation name: Operation Yewtree
- Scope: Domestic

Participants
- Initiated by: Metropolitan Police
- Executed by: Multiple police forces across the United Kingdom, such as; Metropolitan Police; South Yorkshire Police; North Yorkshire Police
- Countries participating: United Kingdom

Mission
- Target: Jimmy Savile (and others, including Rolf Harris, Gary Glitter, and Max Clifford)

Timeline
- Date begin: 19 October 2012
- Date end: 2015

Results
- Arrests: 19
- Convictions: 7

Operation Yewtree was a British police investigation into the sexual abuse, predominantly the abuse of children, committed by multiple media personalities. The investigation, led by the Metropolitan Police, started amid the exposure of Jimmy Savile as a sex offender in October 2012. After a period of assessment, it became a full criminal investigation, involving inquiries into living people, notably other celebrities, as well as Savile, who had died the previous year.

The report of the investigations into Savile himself was published, as Giving Victims a Voice, in January 2013. In June 2014, investigations into Savile's activities at 28 NHS hospitals concluded that he had sexually assaulted staff and patients aged between 5 and 75 over several decades. Operation Yewtree continued as an investigation into others, some, but not all, linked with Savile. By October 2015, 19 people had been arrested by Operation Yewtree; seven of these arrests, including Rolf Harris, Gary Glitter and Max Clifford, led to convictions. The "Yewtree effect" has been credited for an increase in the number of reported sex crimes, while the operation also sparked a debate on police procedure and rights of those who were later cleared of wrongdoing, such as Cliff Richard.

== Background ==
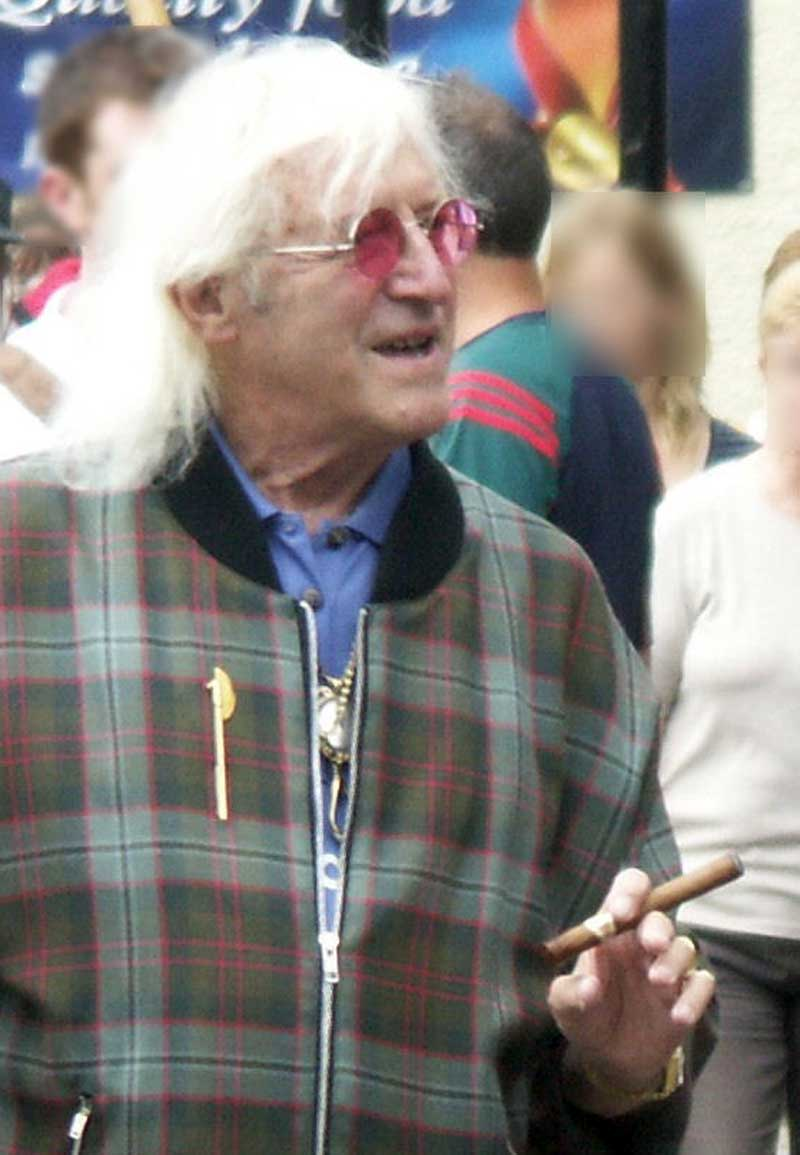
Jimmy Savile in 2006

An ITV documentary, Exposure: The Other Side of Jimmy Savile, researched and presented by former police detective Mark Williams-Thomas, was broadcast on 3 October 2012, almost a year after Savile's death. The programme contained several allegations by women who said that, as teenagers, they had been sexually abused by radio and television personality Jimmy Savile, who had gained access to them through the television programmes he had presented and his charity work. Following the broadcast, many other people came forward to make allegations about Savile's conduct towards young people, including sexual abuse that had taken place on BBC premises and in hospitals to which Savile had access.

== Initial assessments ==
On 4 October 2012, the Metropolitan Police said it would take the national lead in a process of assessing the allegations. The assessment was undertaken by the Serious Case Team of the service's Child Abuse Investigation Command, led by Detective Superintendent David Gray working closely with the BBC. The police said, "Our priority will be to ensure a proportionate and consistent policing response putting the victims at the heart of our enquiries", and that "it is not an investigation at this stage".

The Metropolitan Police announced on 9 October that the inquiry into the allegations would be called Operation Yewtree, and would be undertaken jointly with the NSPCC. The police had formally recorded eight allegations against Savile, but announced they were following 120 lines of inquiry, covering up to 25 victims of abuse, mainly girls aged between 13 and 16. The allegations covered four decades, from 1959 until the 1980s, and were on "a national scale". Commander Peter Spindler, head of specialist crime investigations, said, "At this stage it is quite clear from what women are telling us that Savile was a predatory sex offender."

"Yewtree" was chosen from a list of names which are intended to be neutral and unrelated to each particular case. This system, dating back to the 1980s, is used for operations which are started to handle specific crimes, as opposed to more general, pro-active operations with names connected to their intent.

== Criminal investigation ==
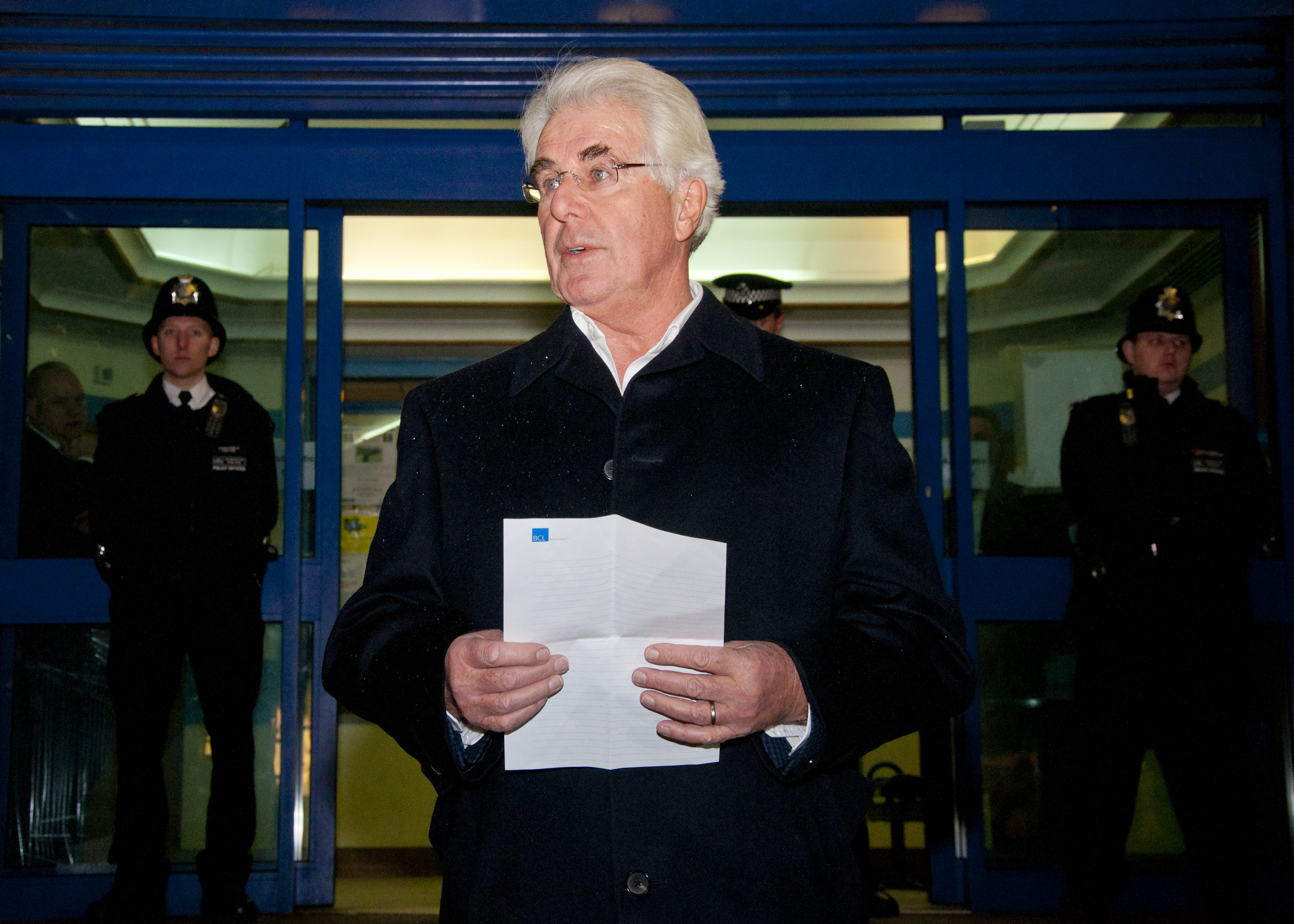
Max Clifford after his December 2012 arrest

The Metropolitan Police launched a criminal investigation on 19 October 2012 as, in addition to the historic allegations of child sex abuse by Savile, it stated that it was pursuing over 400 separate lines of inquiry based on evidence of 200 witnesses via 14 police forces across the UK. On 25 October, the police reported that the number of possible victims was "fast approaching 300". It was also reported that police were looking at allegations that three doctors in hospitals with which Savile had been associated had been involved in the abuse of young people in their care.

The criminal investigations within Operation Yewtree were led by Detective Chief Inspector Michael Orchard as the Senior Investigating Officer and overseen by Chief Superintendent Keith Niven, head of the Metropolitan Police's child abuse investigation command, and by December 2012, 30 officers were involved with the case. Noting that the operation was "dealing with alleged abuse on an unprecedented scale" and that it "empowered a staggering number of victims to come forward to report the sexual exploitation which occurred during their childhood", Commander Peter Spindler said that: "We are dealing with a major criminal investigation. This is a watershed moment for child abuse investigations and Yewtree will be a landmark investigation."

The operation followed three strands: allegations against Savile, allegations against Savile and others, and allegations just involving others. On 11 December, the Metropolitan Police stated that the investigation of the abuse undertaken by Savile had been completed and the report into his alleged offending, Giving Victims a Voice, was released in January 2013. A total of 589 alleged victims of abuse had come forward in the inquiry, of whom 450 alleged abuse by Savile. Of the alleged victims, 82% were female and 80% were children or young people. There were 31 allegations of rape by Savile across seven police force areas. Commander Spindler said: "Savile's offending peaked in the 70s and what we... will be showing... is how he used his position in society... to get his sexual gratification." The operation had involved 30 police officers, and its cost so far was estimated at £2 million.

The investigation into "others" continued after the Savile investigation concluded. In May 2013, The New York Times reported that "at least 69 police officers and staff members" were involved in the operation and that many of the suspects were celebrities. The operation passed files to South Yorkshire Police in the investigation of Cliff Richard, and passed files to North Yorkshire Police in the investigation of Jimmy Tarbuck. Neither case resulted in charges. In June 2016, after child abuse allegations regarding Clement Freud were made public, it was reported that Operation Yewtree had been passed information about Freud in 2012 when two alleged victims made accusations to the NSPCC.

In late 2015, Operation Yewtree was folded into Operation Winter Key, the Met's component of Operation Hydrant. A December 2015 freedom of information disclosure revealed that Scotland Yard had spent £2.2m a year on Operation Yewtree.

== Arrests leading to convictions ==
Date	Suspect	Image	Background	History	Sentence
28 October 2012	Paul Gadd ("Gary Glitter")		Former glam rock singer and previously convicted sex offender	Gadd was questioned and released on bail until 5 June 2014, when he was charged with eight child sex offences dating back to the 1970s. On 5 February 2015, Gadd was convicted of attempted rape, four counts of indecent assault, and one count of having sex with a girl under the age of 13. He was acquitted of the three other counts.	Sentenced on 27 February 2015 to 16 years in prison. Gadd was released on licence in February 2023, but was recalled to prison in March of that year for breaching his licence conditions.
15 November 2012	David Patrick Griffin ("Dave Lee Travis")		Disc jockey, radio and television presenter	Arrested in Bedfordshire on 15 November, Griffin was later released on bail. The police said allegations against him were unrelated to Savile, and Griffin said his arrest had been on matters not linked to children. Griffin was re-arrested on 13 March 2013 on suspicion of further sexual offences. Griffin was charged on 15 August 2013 on suspicion of twelve historical sex offences. Following a trial at Southwark Crown Court, on 13 February 2014 Griffin was found not guilty on twelve counts of sexual assault, with the jury unable to reach a decision on a further two counts. Griffin faced a retrial on the two outstanding counts in September 2014 and also faced a new charge of indecently assaulting a researcher working on TV's Mrs Merton Show in 1995. He was convicted of this charge. Griffin was acquitted on one count, and on the third count the jury were unable to return a verdict.	Sentenced to three months in prison suspended for two years.
6 December 2012	Max Clifford		Publicist	After his release on bail, he denied what he termed the "damaging and totally untrue allegations". On 26 April 2013, Clifford was charged with eleven indecent assaults against girls and young women between 1965 and 1985. On 28 April 2014, Clifford was convicted of eight charges of indecent assault, acquitted of two charges of indecent assault and the jury was hung on one charge of indecent assault. Clifford was rearrested by Operation Yewtree police on 12 March 2015 and charged with an additional count of indecent assault on 3 July 2015. He was cleared by a jury of the charge on 7 July 2016.	Sentenced to eight years' imprisonment on 2 May 2014 in HM Prison Wandsworth. Later moved to HM Prison Littlehey in June 2014. Clifford died from a cardiac arrest in December 2017 after collapsing in his prison cell.
28 March 2013	Rolf Harris		Australian-born musician, singer-songwriter, painter, and television personality	In late November 2012, an unnamed man in his 80s was questioned by the Metropolitan Police and his Berkshire house was searched. He was arrested in Berkshire on 28 March 2013. On 19 April this was stated by the BBC and other media sources to be Rolf Harris. On 29 August Harris was charged with 13 separate offences relating to the abuse of minors. On 23 December 2013, Harris was charged with three further separate sexual assault charges which are against females aged 19 in 1984, aged seven or eight in 1968 or 1969, and aged 14 in 1975. Harris's trial began on 6 May 2014, involving him being accused of grooming a friend of his daughter's from the age of 13 with evidence being an 'apology letter' allegedly written by Harris to the victim's family. Sasha Wass QC, prosecuting, said "Mr Harris was too famous, too powerful and his reputation made him untouchable". He was found guilty on all twelve counts on 30 June 2014. It was reported in July 2014, October 2014 and February 2015, that he was being investigated by police over other alleged sexual offences. On 12 February 2016 the CPS announced that Harris would face seven further indecent assault charges involving seven complainants aged between 12 and 27 and having allegedly occurred from 1971 to 2004. On 8 February 2017, Harris was cleared of three charges. The judge discharged the jury from deliberating on the further four counts of which he was accused. After facing a retrial in May, the jury were unable to reach verdicts and prosecutors announced that they would not pursue another retrial.	Sentenced to five years and nine months in prison on 4 July 2014. Incarcerated at HM Prison Bullingdon, before being moved to HM Prison Stafford. Released from prison on 19 May 2017. Harris died on 10 May 2023.
June 2013	Chris Denning		Former Radio 1 disc jockey and previously convicted sex offender	Arrested in June 2013 and bailed until September. On 22 May 2014, he was charged with 41 sex offences. Denning pleaded guilty to 29 charges on 5 August 2014. He pleaded guilty to the remaining charges on 14 November 2014. The offences took place from 1967 to 1987 and involve 26 male victims, the youngest having been nine at the time. Denning was later convicted of additional offences as part of Operation Ravine.	Sentenced to 13 years in prison in 2014. and an additional 13 years in 2016. Denning died on 24 June 2022 from diabetes at Bedford Hospital, whilst still serving his sentence.
17 December 2013	Michael Salmon		Medical doctor at the Stoke Mandeville Hospital, where Savile allegedly abused some of his victims, and previously convicted sex offender	Initially charged with assaulting four girls under the age of 16 between 1972 and 1985, including one count of rape, Salmon pleaded not guilty. On 6 February 2015, Salmon was found guilty of nine indecent assaults and two rapes, with victims' ages ranging from 11 to 18 and having occurred between 1973 and 1988. Despite working at Stoke Mandeville at the same time as Savile there is no known link between them. In January 2016, Salmon was charged with 26 child sex offences, including one count of rape. On 12 December 2016, Salmon was convicted of an additional 14 charges.	Sentenced to 18 years in prison in 2015 and an additional four years in 2016. Salmon died from sepsis in hospital in 2018, while in prison custody.
13 May 2015	Geoffrey Wheeler		BBC employee (no relation to late broadcaster Geoffrey Wheeler)	In September 2016, Wheeler was charged with five counts of indecent assault. He pleaded not guilty and his trial at Southwark Crown Court began in March 2017. On 3 April 2017, Wheeler was convicted on one count of indecent assault and cleared of four other charges.	Sentenced to 50 hours of unpaid work and ordered to pay £150 in restitution to the victim and £500 towards the prosecution's costs.

== Other arrests ==
Date	Suspect	Background	History	Status
1 November 2012	Freddie Starr	Comedian	Arrested four times by February 2014. On 6 May 2014, the Crown Prosecution Service announced that Starr would not be prosecuted. Starr later filed a defamation claim against an accuser who claimed that he groped her in Jimmy Savile's dressing room after appearing on Clunk Click when she was 15 in 1974. The judge dismissed the claim and stated that the accuser had proven that he had groped her.	No prosecution. Died in 2019.
11 November 2012	Wilfred De'Ath	Author, journalist and former BBC producer	Arrested in Cambridge on suspicion of connected sexual offences; he was later released on bail, denying the claims made against him. No charges were brought against De'Ath after the complainant withdrew her statement in March 2013. De'Ath was later told that he would not face any charges, and said that the police action had been "overzealous".	No prosecution. Died in 2020.
10 December 2012	David Smith	Chauffeur and previously convicted sex offender	Smith was the first suspect to be charged in the investigation on 3 April 2013 having been arrested on 10 December 2012. On 28 October 2013, Smith was found dead after failing to appear for a court appearance. Although sometimes described as a "(former) BBC driver", the corporation could find no evidence that he had ever been employed by them. The coroner ruled that his death was a suicide.	Deceased.
19 December 2012	Ted Beston	BBC radio producer	Arrested on 19 December. On 14 May 2013, it was reported that Beston would not face prosecution due to insufficient evidence.	No prosecution.
2 January 2013	Jim Davidson	Comedian	Arrested on 2 January 2013. It was later announced that he would face no further action.	No prosecution.
January 2013	Mike Osman	Disc jockey and impressionist	Arrested around the same time as Davidson. He was released without charge.	No prosecution.
5 February 2013	Unnamed 65-year-old man	Unknown	Arrested in South London on 5 February.	No prosecution.
4 April 2013	Unnamed 65-year-old man	Unknown	Arrested in Somerset on 4 April. On 16 October it was confirmed he would not be prosecuted.	No prosecution.
29 October 2013	Paul Gambaccini	American-British radio and television presenter and author	Two unnamed men aged 64 and 74 were arrested on 29 October at separate addresses in South London, on 1 November 2013, and it was reported that BBC broadcaster Paul Gambaccini was the 64-year-old man arrested on suspicion of historical sexual offences as part of Operation Yewtree. Gambaccini was given bail, and his spokesman said that he denied the allegations. On 10 October 2014, it was announced that he would not be prosecuted.	No prosecution.
29 October 2013	Unnamed 74-year-old man	Unknown	Arrested in South London, and given bail, alongside Gambaccini. On 10 October 2014, it was announced that he would not be prosecuted.	No prosecution.
8 April 2014	Walid Moussa	BBC Arabic translator	Arrested in North London on suspicion of sexual offences. On 20 February 2015 he was charged with seven counts of indecent assault on a woman over the age of 16 between July 1983 and July 1984. He pleaded not guilty, and a jury at Harrow Crown Court found him not guilty on 28 November 2016.	Acquitted.
7 October 2015	Unnamed 79-year-old man	Unknown	The man was held in Essex and released on bail until early December. He was never prosecuted.	No prosecution.

== Giving Victims a Voice ==
The joint report prepared by the Metropolitan Police Service and the NSPCC, Giving Victims a Voice, was published in January 2013, and marked the end of investigations under Operation Yewtree into Savile alone.

According to the report, sex offences were committed by Savile on 450 people (328 being minors at the time) across England and Scotland, and also in Jersey. The vast majority of the alleged offences occurred in his home town of Leeds and his main workplace in London. The victims were mainly unacquainted with each other. Savile may have committed more than 30 rapes, with a total of 126 claims of indecent acts having been recorded.

Most of the allegations had not previously been reported to authorities, the reasons given included fear of disbelief and distrust in the judicial system. At least seven allegations of sexual assault made to police during Savile's lifetime were not linked by police, with Savile as the same alleged perpetrator. The Crown Prosecution Service (CPS) said that the allegations made to Surrey Police between 2007 and 2009 could have resulted in prosecutions being undertaken.

Approximately 600 people had provided information at the time of the report's publication with 450 relating to Savile. This resulted in the formal recording of a total of 214 alleged criminal offences across 28 police forces. No attacks within the West Mercia area are included in the figures, and Gray expected the number of recorded offences to rise above the 214 considered by the report.

The report acknowledges that agencies such as the police and the NHS have "failed victims over decades". It describes Savile as "one of the UK's most prolific known sexual predators..." It concluded that "no clear evidence" was found that Savile operated in a paedophile ring, but investigations were continuing regarding the possibility of his being a member of an "informal network". The report suggests that Savile may not have been caught partly because, during the most prolific period, police investigations into such crimes at that time "lacked the specialist skills, knowledge and the collaborative approach of later years".

== Concurrent investigations ==
=== Other high-profile arrests ===
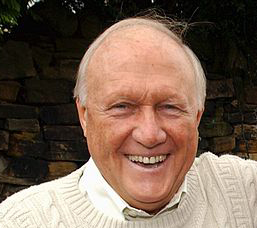
Stuart Hall was jailed in 2013.

During Operation Yewtree, several other high-profile British public figures were investigated for sexual offences. These included television and radio presenter Stuart Hall, who was convicted of 15 counts of indecent assault, ITV Granada weatherman Fred Talbot, who was jailed after being found guilty of sexually assaulting two schoolboys, and DJ and friend of Savile, Ray Teret, who was found guilty of seven rapes and eleven indecent assaults and was sentenced to 25 years imprisonment. Coronation Street actors William Roache and Michael Le Vell were both separately found not guilty of all charges made against them, and DJ Neil Fox was acquitted of several charges.

Although these allegations, investigations and prosecutions were not directly connected to Operation Yewtree, they were linked in the public imagination. In particular, Roache's defence argued that Operation Yewtree had created an atmosphere in which allegations of sexual abuse against celebrities were more likely to be taken to prosecution, while several other commentators speculated that the decision in particular to prosecute Roache and Le Vell may have been influenced by the high profile of Yewtree.

=== Operation Hydrant ===
In response to the large increase of complainants coming forward in the wake of the Savile scandal, and to avoid the risk of investigators looking at the same individuals and institutions, the National Police Chiefs' Council (NPCC) launched Operation Hydrant in June 2014. This was a new operation giving support and guidance to forces dealing with the complex cases involved. Hydrant formed the oversight and coordination of child sexual abuse investigations concerning persons of public prominence, or of offences which took place within institutional settings.

By May 2015, 1433 suspects – including 261 of "public prominence" (135 from TV, film or radio) and 666 from institutions (including 154 from schools, 75 from children's homes, 40 from religious institutions and 14 medical establishments) – had been identified. Operation Hydrant was not responsible for conducting independent investigations; but gathered information from other inquiries, including Operation Yewtree.

Operation Hydrant was transformed into the Hydrant Programme in 2022, a policing policy, research and support service to improve the safeguarding of children and investigation of child sexual abuse in the UK.

=== Operation Ravine ===
Operation Ravine was an investigation launched in 2015 by Surrey Police into alleged sexual abuse connected to the Walton Hop disco. A previous investigation into the Walton Hop disco, Operation Arundel, resulted in the convictions of Chris Denning and music mogul Jonathan King for child sex offences in the early 2000s. Matthew Kelly was also arrested in 2003, but subsequently cleared of all charges. In January 2014, Merseyside Police carried out an independent review of Operation Arundel and related materials were shared with Operation Yewtree. On 10 September 2015, three men were arrested as part of Operation Ravine, including Jonathan King. Denning was charged with six offences stemming from the investigation on 7 June 2016, and he pleaded guilty to 21 offences on 22 August 2016. Denning, who was already sentenced to 13 years stemming from his Yewtree convictions, was sentenced to an additional 13 years for these offences on 7 October. King stood trial in June 2018 but the jury was discharged for legal reasons. On 6 August 2018, King received an apology for the collapse of the trial, with Judge Deborah Taylor saying that Surrey Police had made "numerous, repeated and compounded" errors during the investigation, describing the situation as a "debacle".

=== Operation Midland ===
In response to increasing public outcry and government pressure in the wake of the Savile scandal, Metropolitan Police launched Operation Midland in November 2014, to investigate allegations of child abuse against several high-profile British citizens in positions of authority. The operation was conducted over eighteen months against a group of 12 men, but unlike other child abuse cases being investigated, detectives conducting the investigations made several critical errors in regards to the allegations made, the treatment of those accused, and the evidence supplied to them, and failed to find sufficient evidence to support the accusations against the group. The operation ended in March 2016 as a complete failure, causing considerable damage to those accused, damaged the likelihood of genuine victims of abuse coming forward, and cost the Metropolitan Police several millions of pounds in operational costs, compensation, and subsequent investigations against the individual who made the allegations. A 2016 inquiry into the conduct of the police taskforce damned the operation for its failings and left considerable questions over the investigative conduct into the accountability of officers for misconduct. The individual who made the false allegations, Carl Beech (himself a child sex offender), was later charged in 2018, and jailed for eighteen years in 2019.

== Reactions and analysis ==
A sharp increase in sex crimes from Oct 2012 coincides with the start of Operation Yewtree.

Yewtree was credited for an increase in the reporting of sexual offences. Dubbed the "Yewtree effect", reports of sexual offences recorded by police rose 17% by 2013. In 2019, Louis Theroux compared Operation Yewtree to sexual abuse allegations made against Hollywood producer Harvey Weinstein, which led to the Weinstein effect and created a global trend in which powerful men were accused of sexual misconduct.

In response to some having labelled Operation Yewtree a "witch-hunt", Joan Smith of The Guardian stated that the conviction of Max Clifford vindicated the operation, and Martin Evans of The Daily Telegraph said that despite several high-profile failures, Rolf Harris' conviction vindicated it. Metropolitan Police Commissioner Bernard Hogan-Howe denied claims of a witch-hunt, commenting that the alternative would be to ignore allegations. Paul Gambaccini, who was arrested and bailed repeatedly for a year before being told he would face no further action, testified before the House of Commons Home Affairs Select Committee on 3 March 2015. He told MPs he was the victim of a witch-hunt and that he was used as human "fly paper" to encourage other people to come forward and make allegations against him. Director of Public Prosecutions Alison Saunders denied the allegations. In a November 2015 debate organised by the NSPCC on whether investigations into historic sexual abuse had turned into "media witch-hunts", former Metropolitan Police commander Peter Spindler said that police "got some things wrong" and that they "didn't have sufficient resources in place".

In an article for The Spectator, Rod Liddle criticised the handling of these cases by police, especially in the case of Freddie Starr, who was arrested four times and bailed nine times before being told he would not be charged, claiming: "the way the police have conducted the process is hugely unfair". In the aftermath of Cliff Richard's August 2014 property search, human rights barrister Geoffrey Robertson wrote in The Independent that the long delays before announcing charges amounted to "outrageous treatment", adding: "This has been one of the most intolerable features of other high-profile arrests for 'historic' offences, namely the inability of police and prosecutors to deliver Magna Carta’s truly historic promise that justice will not be delayed." After others, including Jim Davidson and Gambaccini, were left on bail for many months before being told they would not face charges, then-Home Secretary Theresa May proposed that bail time be limited to 28 days. The 28-day limit came into effect in April 2017.

Noting that some of the high-profile arrests did not lead to convictions, Variety described Operation Yewtree as a "botched" investigation. At a Labour Party conference in July 2014, comedian and friend of Gambaccini Stephen Fry criticised the operation, pointing out that fewer than half of those accused at the time had been found guilty, and called for tougher laws to prevent false sex abuse allegations. MP Nigel Evans, who was cleared of unrelated sexual assault charges, called for individuals to receive anonymity until charged after the CPS announced that it would not charge Gambaccini. Although the case against Dave Lee Travis resulted in a conviction on one count of indecent assault for groping an adult woman's breast for 15 seconds in 1995, Rosie Millard and Carole Malone wrote separate opinion pieces in The Independent and The Daily Mirror respectively in which they questioned whether police resources should have been spent pursuing other crimes.

In February 2016, Irish Supreme Court Judge Adrian Hardiman criticised the methods used by Operation Yewtree, particularly the treatment of Paul Gambaccini, as well as the investigations of Cliff Richard and the Operation Midland cases of Leon Brittan and Edwin Bramall, for what he described as the radical undermining of the presumption of innocence. Richard Henriques conducted an inquiry into the Metropolitan Police's sexual abuse investigations and was critical of the handling of Operation Midland but reserved praise for Operation Yewtree. Gambaccini, Bramall and Harvey Proctor, who had been investigated by Operation Midland, sued the Metropolitan Police for £3m in February 2017. In November 2018, Gambaccini reached an out-of-court settlement with the Crown Prosecution Service and received an undisclosed amount in damages.

Operation Yewtree was the inspiration for a drama, National Treasure, starring Robbie Coltrane, Julie Walters and Andrea Riseborough. Coltrane played Paul Finchley, a fictional light-entertainment performer accused of rape, Walters played Finchley's wife Marie, and Riseborough played their daughter Danielle ("Dee"). The four-part series, by The Forge, was broadcast September–October 2016 on Channel 4. A Channel 4 documentary titled The Accused: National Treasures on Trial examined the investigation in 2022.

== See also ==
- Broadmoor Hospital § Abuse
- Stoke Mandeville Hospital § Historic sexual abuse at the hospital
