= Jack (magazine) =

British men's magazine

- Categories: Men's
- Publisher: Dennis Publishing, Inc.
- Founded: 2002
- Final issue: August 2004
- Country: United Kingdom
- Language: English

Jack was an English language British lad mag which was in circulation between 2002 and 2004.

== History ==
Jack magazine was initially published by I Feel Good (IFG) in 2002 in A5 format. With the tag "an orgy of war, animals, fashion, genius and cool", it featured glamorous photo shoots of women, reviews of clothing, gadgets etc. and articles by regular contributors and others by celebrities.

As opposed to magazines like FHM, there was more space in the magazine given over to written articles and reviews than photo shoots to appeal to a more mature market. It was similar to the stance GQ magazine took, even though it was a publication that was often made fun of in Jack.

== Decline ==
A change of ownership occurred in 2003 when IFG was bought by Dennis Publishing and a relaunch saw the magazine grow in size in November of that year. Despite this and special DVDs given away with the magazine, it was closed in August 2004 with fewer than 40,000 copies sold.
