= Whitby Hospital =

Hospital in Whitby, North Yorkshire, England

- Humber Teaching NHS Foundation Trust
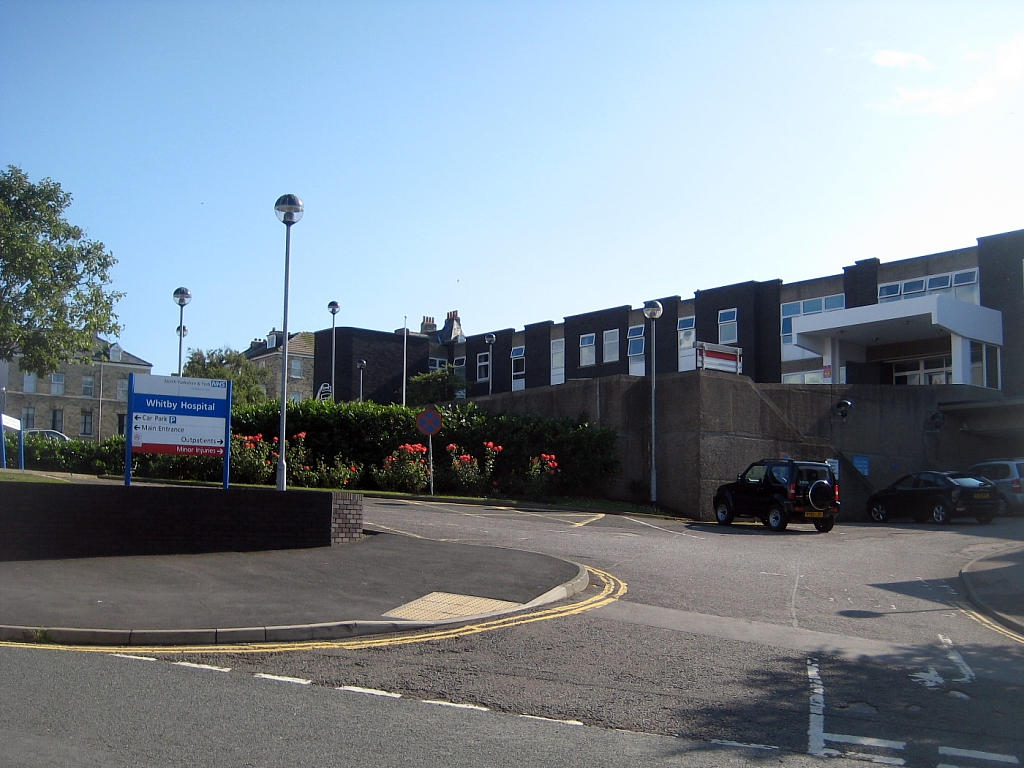
- Whitby Hospital

- Location in North Yorkshire

Geography
- Location: Whitby, North Yorkshire, England
- Coordinates: 54.4840°N 0.6190°W

Organisation
- Type: Community Hospital

History
- Founded: 1896

Links
- Lists: Hospitals in England

The Whitby Hospital is a community hospital in Springhill, Whitby, North Yorkshire, England. It is managed by Humber Teaching NHS Foundation Trust.

== History ==
The hospital was first housed in a Church Street facility in 1896. In 1901 that was replaced by a more permanent facility in Grape Street in 1901. A new facility built to commemorate lives lost in the First World War was built at Springhill and opened by Princess Mary in 1925. The memorial hospital was demolished and replaced by a modern facility which was opened by Princess Margaret in 1979. In February 2018 it was agreed to redevelop the hospital site at a cost of £12 million into a "health and wellbeing hub" with an urgent care centre and 19 inpatient beds.
