= Jimmy Savile sexual abuse scandal =

Abuse scandal in the United Kingdom

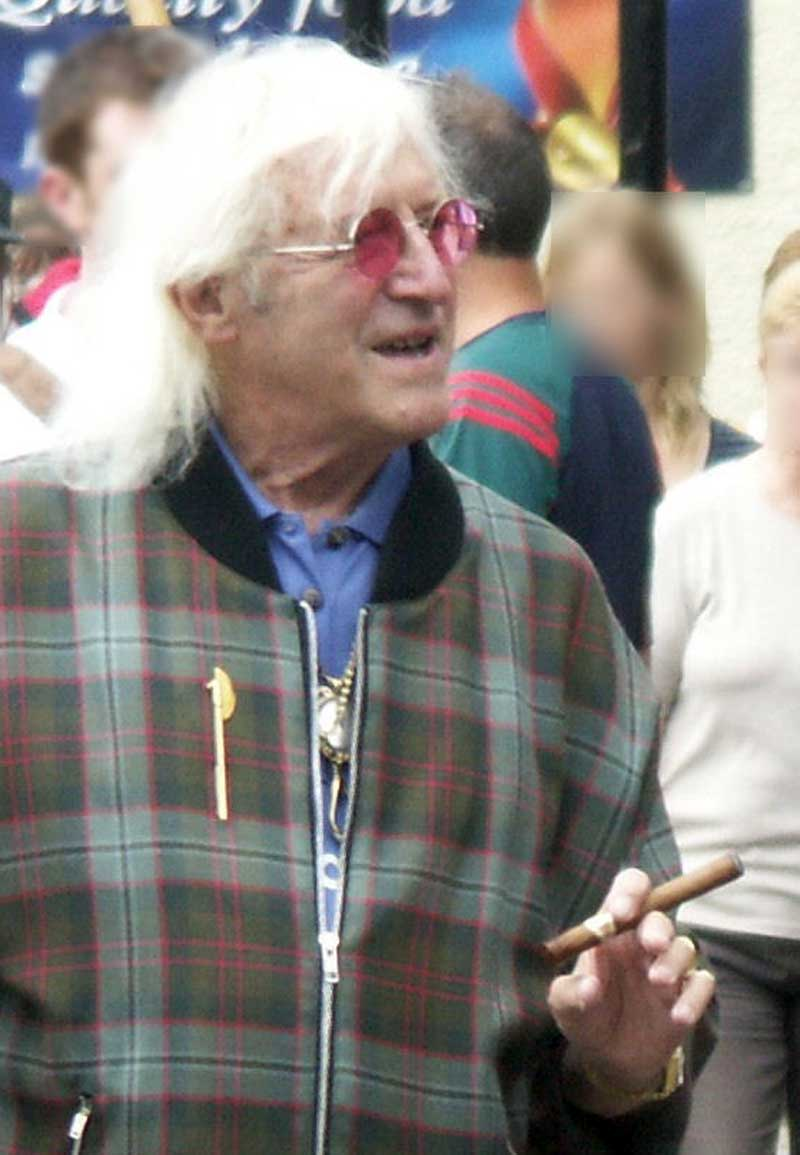
Savile at the Highland games in Lochaber in 2006

In late 2012, it emerged that Jimmy Savile, a British media personality who had died the previous year, had sexually abused hundreds of people throughout his life, mostly children but some as old as 75, and mostly female. He had been well known in the United Kingdom for his eccentric image and was generally respected for his charitable work, which associated him with the British monarchy and other individuals of personal power.

On 3 October 2012, an ITV documentary presented by investigative reporter Mark Williams-Thomas was broadcast in which several women said that, as teenagers, they had been sexually abused by Savile. By 11 October, allegations had been made against Savile to 13 British police forces, which led to the setting-up of inquiries into practices within both the BBC and the National Health Service (NHS), both institutions that had worked closely with Savile. On 19 October, London's Metropolitan Police (Met) launched a formal criminal investigation, Operation Yewtree, into historic allegations of child sexual abuse by Savile and other individuals, some still living, covering four decades. The Met stated that it was pursuing over 400 lines of inquiry, based on the claims of 200 witnesses, via 14 police forces across the UK. It described the alleged abuse as being "on an unprecedented scale" and the number of potential victims as "staggering." By 19 December, eight people had been questioned as part of the investigation. The Met stated that the total number of alleged victims was 589, of whom 450 alleged abuse by Savile.

The report of the investigations undertaken jointly by the police and the National Society for the Prevention of Cruelty to Children (NSPCC), Giving Victims a Voice, was published on 11 January 2013. It reported allegations covering a period of 50 years, including 214 alleged acts by Savile which, though uncorroborated, have been formally recorded as crimes, some involving children as young as eight. The report states "within the recorded crimes there are 126 indecent acts and 34 rape/penetration offences." Alleged offences took place at 13 hospitals as well as on BBC premises, according to the report.

In October 2013, it was announced that inquiries had widened to other hospitals. On 26 June 2014, the Secretary of State for Health Jeremy Hunt reported on the findings of the investigations led by Kate Lampard. He said that Savile had sexually assaulted victims aged between 5 and 75 in NHS hospitals, and Hunt apologised to the victims. Further investigations, in hospitals and elsewhere, led to additional allegations of sexual abuse by Savile.

Savile often came into contact with his victims through his creative projects for the BBC and his charitable work for the NHS. A significant part of his career and public life involved working with children and young people, including visiting schools and hospital wards. He spent 20 years from 1964 presenting Top of the Pops, aimed at a teenage audience, and an overlapping 20 years presenting Jim'll Fix It, in which he helped the wishes of viewers, mainly children, come true. During his lifetime, two police investigations considered reports about Savile, the earliest known being in 1958, but neither investigation had led to charges; each had concluded that there was insufficient evidence for any charges to be brought related to sexual offences. In 2007, he had been interviewed by the police under caution and in 2008 he started legal action over allegations in The Sun. In October 2012 it was announced that then-Director of Public Prosecutions Keir Starmer would investigate why proceedings against Savile in 2009 were dropped. A BBC Newsnight investigation into reports Savile had sexually abused children was scheduled for broadcast on 7 December 2011 but cancelled. From October 2012, that cancellation together with the BBC's other handling of concerns about Savile became the subject of further inquiries and investigative reporting.

The scandal was a major factor leading to the establishment of the wider-ranging Independent Inquiry into Child Sexual Abuse (IICSA), which was announced by the Home Secretary Theresa May in July 2014 and was initially administered by Baroness Butler-Sloss (appointed July 2014) and Fiona Woolf (appointed 5 September 2014). In February 2015, the inquiry was reconfigured as a statutory inquiry under the Inquiries Act 2005 framework chaired by Justice Lowell Goddard.

== Background ==
In his autobiography, Savile describes himself as having a predilection for young girls. He would joke to the press when they phoned him: "She told me she was over 16." Press investigations dating back to at least 1973 did not lead to the publication of any direct accusations being made against Savile, although rumours persisted and were intermittently mentioned in the print media for many years.

Savile claimed the key to his success on the BBC programme Jim'll Fix It had been that he disliked children, although he later admitted to saying it to deflect scrutiny of his private life. He did not own a computer as he did not want people to think he was downloading child pornography. In a 1990 interview for The Independent on Sunday, Lynn Barber asked Savile about rumours that he liked "little girls." Savile said: "The young girls in question don't gather round me because of me – it's because I know the people they love, the stars... I am of no interest to them."

In 1995, Savile was the subject of a 45-minute interview by Andrew Neil for the TV series Is This Your Life?. His personal life was the subject of Neil's close questioning but Savile deflected the attention and humoured the audience by eating a banana.

In April 2000, Savile was the subject of a Louis Theroux documentary in the When Louis Met... series. In it, Theroux asked Savile about speculation he was a paedophile. Savile said:

"[We] live in a very funny world. And it's easier for me, as a single man, to say 'I don't like children' because that puts a lot of salacious tabloid people off the hunt.... How do they know whether I am [a paedophile] or not? How does anybody know whether I am? Nobody knows whether I am or not. I know I'm not."

A follow-up documentary, Louis Theroux: Savile, about Theroux's inability to detect Savile's true nature, aired on BBC Two in 2016. Broadcaster and journalist Orla Barry, on the Irish radio station Newstalk in 2007, asked Savile about allegations aired during the original Theroux documentary. In 2012, Barry remembered that Savile responded, "What rumours?", and expressed surprise that other journalists had not pursued the matter, saying, "Maybe in the UK they were slightly closer to him."

In 2007, Savile was interviewed under caution by police investigating an allegation of indecent assault at the now-closed Duncroft Approved School for Girls near Staines, Surrey, in the 1970s, when he was a regular visitor. The Crown Prosecution Service (CPS) advised there was insufficient evidence to take any further action and no charges were brought. In 2012, it was reported that staff at the school had not been questioned about the allegations at the time. A former headmistress of the school said she had been "hoodwinked" by Savile, but described some of those who had brought the allegations as "delinquents."

In March 2008, Savile began legal proceedings against The Sun newspaper, which had linked him in several articles to child abuse at the Jersey children's home Haut de la Garenne. Savile denied visiting Haut de la Garenne but admitted doing so after a photograph was published showing him at the home surrounded by children. The States of Jersey Police said an allegation of indecent assault by Savile at the home in the 1970s had been investigated in 2008, but there had been insufficient evidence to proceed.

== Journalism ==
=== Aborted Newsnight report ===
On the evening of October 28, 2011, Savile stated, "If I’m no better tomorrow I will go" during a phone call to Alistair Hall who had suggested he should return to hospital due to ill health and suffering from pneumonia. Savile was found dead from cardiac arrest, heart failure, ischaemic disease and renal failure the next day, aged 84. At the time of his death and funeral in Leeds Cathedral, he was widely praised for his charity and voluntary activities as well as his entertainment work.

Immediately after Savile's death, Meirion Jones and Liz MacKean from the BBC programme Newsnight began to investigate reports that he had sexually abused children. They interviewed one alleged victim on camera and talked to others who were willing to be quoted about alleged abuse at Duncroft Approved School, the BBC, and Stoke Mandeville Hospital. The former headmistress of Duncroft was Jones' own aunt. The Newsnight team, which included former police detective Mark Williams-Thomas, also found out about a 2009 Surrey Police investigation into Savile. The report was scheduled for broadcast on 7 December 2011, but a decision was taken to cancel its transmission, which ultimately developed into a major crisis for the BBC when the allegations against Savile were made public in October 2012. The subsequent Pollard Review found that Jones and MacKean had assembled cogent evidence that Savile had a history of abusing young women and Newsnight had been in a position to break the story in 2011. In November 2021, Mark Williams-Thomas spoke to GB News calling the BBC's treatment of the allegations "absolutely appalling."

In January 2012, the Sunday Mirror reported that Newsnight had investigated allegations of sexual abuse immediately after Savile's death but that the report had been shelved. An article by Miles Goslett in the March 2012 edition of The Oldie alleged a cover-up. The BBC showed two Savile tributes over the 2011 Christmas period, and it was alleged that the Newsnight report had been dropped because its content would have compromised the showing of the tributes. A joint submission to the Leveson Inquiry from Anna van Heeswijk (Object), Jacqui Hunt (Equality Now), Heather Harvey (Eaves) and Marai Larasi (End Violence against Women) was titled "Just the Women", a phrase which was reportedly written by Newsnight editor Peter Rippon in an email to a colleague concerning the lack of other authorities [than the alleged female victims] for evidence of Savile's abuse. A Newsnight spokesman said, "Any suggestion that a story was dropped for anything other than editorial reasons is completely untrue."

In October 2013, the transcript of Surrey Police's interview with Savile in 2009 was published after a request under the Freedom of Information Act. Savile denied the sexual abuse allegations relating to Duncroft Approved School put to him by the police, saying, "I've never, ever done anything wrong" and stating that the accusers wanted a "few quid."

=== Exposure: The Other Side of Jimmy Savile ===
An ITV documentary, Exposure: The Other Side of Jimmy Savile, was broadcast on 3 October 2012. It was researched and presented by Mark Williams-Thomas, the former police investigator who had previously been involved in the shelved Newsnight investigation.

Several women interviewed by Exposure said that, as teenagers, they had been sexually abused by Savile. It was also said Savile obtained access to teenage girls through his television programmes Top of the Pops and Clunk, Click (1973–74), and his charity work. Savile's former colleagues said he made no attempt to hide his interest in girls from them, while another said she had walked in on him kissing an underage girl. One woman who said Savile had sexually assaulted her in 1970, when she was 14, explained she had not pursued her complaint to police in 2008 after being told it would lead to a "media circus". The founder of ChildLine, Esther Rantzen, was shown the interviews by Williams-Thomas and commented that, "There were always rumours that [Savile] behaved very inappropriately sexually with children."

An update to the original documentary, Exposure Update: The Jimmy Savile Investigation, was shown on ITV on 21 November. It won a Peabody Award in 2012.

=== BBC comments and investigations ===
Newspaper reports claimed Douglas Muggeridge, controller of BBC Radio 1 in the early 1970s, was aware of allegations against Savile, and asked for a report in 1973. Derek Chinnery, controller of Radio 1 from 1978 to 1985, recalled an occasion when he confronted Savile, saying, "I asked, 'What's all this, these rumours we hear about you, Jimmy?' And he said, 'That's all nonsense'. There was no reason to disbelieve." Michael Grade told Channel 4 News that during his time at the BBC he had "fleetingly" heard rumours about Savile, but described claims of a cover-up as "ludicrous". The BBC said no evidence of allegations of misconduct or actual misconduct by Savile had been found in its files and denied there had been a cover-up of his activities.

On 8 October 2012, the Director-General of the BBC, George Entwistle, apologised for what had happened and said further internal investigations would take place. The chairman of the BBC Trust, Lord Patten, said the investigation would be set up as soon as police enquiries had been completed, and would be chaired by a figure from outside the BBC. As a result of the shelving of the Newsnight investigation into Savile's activities, there were complaints on Newswatch. On 11 October 2012, Entwistle asked BBC Scotland director Ken MacQuarrie to look into staff concerns over the dropping of the item. He announced a review of BBC policy on child protection and an inquiry into its culture and practices, focusing on the years Savile worked there.

The BBC was criticised in Parliament for its handling of the affair. Harriet Harman said the allegations "cast a stain" on the corporation. Culture Secretary Maria Miller said she was satisfied the BBC was taking the allegations very seriously, and dismissed calls for an independent inquiry. Labour leader Ed Miliband said an independent inquiry was the only way to ensure justice for those involved. Entwistle offered to appear before the Culture, Media and Sport Committee to explain the BBC's position and actions.

On 16 October the BBC appointed heads of two inquiries into events surrounding Savile. Former High Court judge Dame Janet Smith, who led the inquiry into serial killer Harold Shipman, was to review the culture and practices of the BBC during the time Savile worked there, and Nick Pollard, a former Sky News executive, would look at why the Newsnight investigation was dropped shortly before transmission.

A Panorama investigation into the BBC's actions was broadcast on 22 October 2012. Entwistle declined to be interviewed, citing legal advice that BBC senior management should co-operate only with the police, the BBC's reviews and Parliament. On 21 October it was reported that Jones had warned Rippon in December 2011 that the BBC risked being accused of a cover-up if the item was dropped. On 22 October the BBC announced Rippon would "step aside" from his role of editor with immediate effect. On the day after the Panorama broadcast, Entwistle appeared before the Parliamentary Culture, Media and Sport Committee, at which he faced hostile questioning and stated that it had been a "catastrophic mistake" to cancel the Newsnight broadcast.

Paul Gambaccini, who worked next door to Savile's office at BBC Radio 1 from 1973, said he was aware of rumours of Savile being a necrophile, and stated:

"The expression which I came to associate with Savile's sex partners was ... the now politically incorrect 'under-age subnormals'. He targeted the institutionalised, the hospitalised – and this was known. Why did Jimmy Savile go to hospitals? That's where the patients were."

Gambaccini claimed that Savile bribed the police. Sir Roger Jones, former chairman of Children in Need, the BBC's annual telethon to support disadvantaged children and young people, said Savile had been barred from involvement because of rumours about an inappropriate interest in young girls. Savile had appeared on the telethon in 1984, 1987 and 1989 before Jones became chairman.

The report by Pollard into the BBC's handling of the affair was published on 19 December 2012. It concluded that the decision to drop the Newsnight report on the allegations against Savile in December 2011 was "flawed", but that it had not been done to protect the Savile tribute programmes. However, it criticised Entwistle for apparently failing to read emails warning him of Savile's "dark side", and that, after the allegations against Savile eventually became public, the BBC fell into a "level of chaos and confusion [that] was even greater than was apparent at the time". The BBC announced that Rippon and Newsnight deputy editor Liz Gibbons would be replaced. Transcripts of evidence to the Pollard inquiry, together with emails and other submissions, were published on 22 February 2013.

In 2013 it was revealed that Sex Pistols frontman John Lydon alluded to rumours around Savile and the suppression of them by the media in an interview for BBC Radio 1 in 1978. In the interview Lydon said regarding Savile:

"I bet he's into all kinds of seediness that we all know about, but are not allowed to talk about. I know some rumours. I bet none of this will be allowed out"

After the interviewer suggested libel might be an issue, Lydon replied, "Nothing I've said is libel." These parts of the interview were edited out and first published as a bonus track on a rerelease of Public Image: First Issue in 2013. Lydon claims that, following this interview, him and the Sex Pistols were blacklisted from BBC broadcasts.

Meirion Jones, who first broke the scandal, was fired from the BBC in February 2015. Mackean, who was also involved in the Newsnight report, left the BBC in early 2013, and stated, "When the Savile scandal broke, the BBC tried to smear my reputation." Tom Giles, the editor of Panorama that aired the investigation on Savile on 22 October 2012, stepped down from his role in June 2014 and in 2015 joined ITV as its Controller of Current Affairs.

==== Dame Janet Smith review ====
In November 2012, Dame Janet Smith called for evidence from people who were the subject of inappropriate sexual conduct by Savile on BBC premises, or on location for the BBC; people who knew of or suspected such conduct; anyone who raised concerns about Savile's conduct within the BBC; people who worked for or with Savile on programmes at the BBC between about 1964 and 2007, or who were familiar with "the culture or practices of the BBC during that time insofar as they may have been relevant to preventing or enabling the sexual abuse of children, young people or teenagers"; and people who held senior positions at the BBC who may have relevant information. By 5 December 2012, the review's team had been contacted by "over 290" people, including many former or current BBC employees. On 1 May 2015 it was announced that the review report was finished, but it could not be published as it might prejudice ongoing police investigations.

The review was published on 25 February 2016. Totalling more than 700 pages, it found Savile had sexually abused 72 people and had raped eight people, including an eight-year-old. The review found misconduct had been committed at "virtually every one of the BBC premises at which he worked", including Television Centre, Television Theatre and Lime Grove Studios in London, and Dickenson Road Studios in Manchester. Smith stated some BBC staff members were aware of complaints against Savile but did not pass the information to senior management due to the "culture of not complaining." She described an "atmosphere of fear" still existing at the BBC and said that some of those interviewed for the inquiry did so only after being assured their names would not be published, as they feared reprisal. A separate report into the offending of Stuart Hall, another BBC presenter, was released the same day.

== Further allegations ==
Following the broadcast of the ITV documentary, many people came forward to make allegations about Savile's conduct towards young people. Some abuse was said to have taken place on BBC premises. It was claimed that Savile had abused at least one boy as well as numerous girls.

Claims were made about Savile's activities in hospitals. It was claimed that he sexually abused a 13-year-old patient during a visit to Stoke Mandeville Hospital in 1971 and an eight-year-old girl in the same hospital recovering from an operation. Staff reported he searched the wards for young patients to abuse, and they instructed patients in the children's ward to feign sleep during his visits. A hospital spokesman said that, though it was working with the police, it had no record of inappropriate behaviour by Savile. The BBC carried statements from a retired detective inspector of the local police force that a nurse at Stoke Mandeville hospital had reported Savile's abuse of patients there to him in the 1970s and he had repeatedly informed his superiors about this, but they did not believe him.

A former nurse said she saw Savile molest a brain-damaged patient at Leeds hospital, saying, "He kissed her, and I thought he was a visitor coming to see her, and he started rubbing his hands down her arms and then I don't know of a nice way to put it but he molested her."

Savile was a volunteer at the adult high-security psychiatric Broadmoor Hospital, and in August 1988 was appointed to chair an interim task force overseeing the management of the hospital, after its management board had been suspended. It is alleged that Savile had hospital keys and access to patients' rooms. In a separate allegation, a lawyer said a client had been abused by Savile when he was a 10-year-old at the Haut de la Garenne children's home in Jersey.

Julie Fernandez, who later appeared in BBC television programmes Eldorado and The Office, was invited to a BBC studio to appear on Jim'll Fix It. She recalled her experience in a radio interview: "I was in my wheelchair, but I just remember [Savile's] hands being everywhere and just lingering those two, three, four seconds slightly too long in places they shouldn't [...] It was in a busy room full of people in a studio so it was quite discreetly done and you don't kind of realise what's happening at the time, especially when you're 14 and it's the first time you've ever been in a studio and you're very excited. But I do remember feeling uncomfortable and he had these huge rings on his fingers."

Singer Coleen Nolan said Savile invited her to a hotel when she was 14 and had been involved in a TV recording at the Top of the Pops studio and that it made her "uncomfortable", "But you didn't talk about those things then." Savile's great-niece Caroline Robinson said she had been sexually abused by him twice at family gatherings. She believed some members of the family knew about his abuse but had turned a blind eye to it.

The British Prime Minister, David Cameron, said that he was "truly shocked" by the published allegations, which should be "properly investigated". The Jimmy Savile Charitable Trust stated that it was considering giving funds to those working with victims of sexual abuse, and that it may change its name because of the allegations; the trust later announced that it would close. As part of the investigations, enquiries would be made into allegations of abuse when Savile worked as a volunteer at Leeds General Infirmary.

In October 2012, it was reported that the Sunday Mirror had decided not to publish allegations of sexual abuse at a children's home by two women against Savile. Paul Connew, the newspaper's editor when the women came forward in 1994, described the allegations as "credible and convincing", but said that lawyers had advised against publication. In July 2013, Connew said that he believed that the newspaper would have lost a libel action over the allegations, as the two women, who had been pupils at Duncroft Approved School, did not want to be named. He also expressed concern that a jury would have been "starstruck" by Savile.

In November 2014, the Health Secretary Jeremy Hunt announced that the enquiry had been widened, with the number of NHS organisations investigating allegations of abuse by Savile extended to 41.

== Police and related investigations ==
=== Operation Yewtree ===
On 4 October 2012, the Metropolitan Police said it would take the national lead in a process of assessing the allegations, announcing on 19 October that a criminal inquiry called Operation Yewtree would be undertaken jointly with the National Society for the Prevention of Cruelty to Children (NSPCC).

The allegations covered four decades, from 1959 until the 1980s, and were on "a national scale." Commander Peter Spindler, head of specialist crime investigations, said, "At this stage it is quite clear from what women are telling us that Savile was a predatory sex offender."

Various other people were arrested for questioning, and later bailed, as part of the inquiry. These included former pop star Gary Glitter; comedian Freddie Starr; former BBC producers Wilfred De'Ath and Ted Beston; DJ Dave Lee Travis; publicist Max Clifford; children's entertainer Rolf Harris; and an unnamed man in his 60s. Travis stated that his arrest had been connected with matters not linked to children. Clifford denied what he termed the "damaging and totally untrue allegations".

The report into his alleged offending, Giving Victims a Voice, was released in January 2013. The operation had involved 30 police officers, at a cost estimated at £2 million by that point. A total of 589 alleged victims of abuse had come forward in the inquiry, of whom 450 alleged abuse by Savile.

The report acknowledges that agencies such as the police and the NHS have "failed victims over decades". It describes Savile as "one of the UK's most prolific known sexual predators..." It concluded that "no clear evidence" was found that Savile operated in a paedophile ring, but investigations were continuing regarding the possibility of his being a member of an "informal network". The report suggests that Savile may not have been caught partly because, during the most prolific period, police investigations into such crimes at that time "lacked the specialist skills, knowledge and the collaborative approach of later years".

Reactions to the report were mixed. The former editor of The Daily Telegraph, Charles Moore noted that it did not reveal the "extent of abuse", and that it "contains [no actual evidence], in a sense which a court would recognise", saying that it "undermines justice" by "treat[ing] allegations as facts". Other responses were similarly critical of the report's objectivity, while others held that it delivered something close to justice.

In late 2015, Operation Yewtree became part of Operation Winter Key, the Metropolitan Police's component of Operation Hydrant, which co-ordinated the national police investigations into allegations of "non-recent" child sexual abuse.

=== Crown Prosecution Service ===
On 24 October 2012, the Crown Prosecution Service said the Director of Public Prosecutions, Keir Starmer, would review the service's decisions not to prosecute Savile in 2009 in relation to four claims against him for sexual abuse dating back to the 1970s. The report, prepared by the Principal Legal Advisor to the DPP, Alison Levitt QC, was published on 11 January 2013. It found that, if police and prosecutors had taken a different approach towards the allegations, prosecutions could have been possible in relation to three of the claims. The report also found that the CPS had "no record at all" of the case, the file having been "destroyed" on 26 October 2010. Keir Starmer apologised for the shortcomings of the CPS and criticised two police forces for taking an "unjustifiably cautious" approach.

In November 2013, shortly after he left the position of Director of Public Prosecutions, Starmer called for mandatory reporting which would compel all professionals such as teachers, doctors and social workers to report suspicions of child abuse or face legal consequences in the light of the scandal.

On 3 February 2022, Munira Mirza resigned from her post as Director of the Number 10 Policy Unit under prime minister Boris Johnson. She criticised Johnson's failure to apologise for his unfounded comments, made during Prime Minister's Questions on 2 February, related to Starmer's role in the CPS when the decision not to prosecute Savile was made in 2009, saying that there was "no fair or reasonable basis for that assertion".

=== HMIC assessment of police investigations ===
The Home Secretary, Theresa May, announced on 6 November 2012 that Her Majesty's Inspectorate of Constabulary would also carry out an assessment of all the investigations relating to Savile undertaken by police forces across the country, examine whether allegations were properly investigated, and identify any related issues.

On 12 March 2013, HMIC published their report "Mistakes were made: HMIC's review into allegations and intelligence material concerning Jimmy Savile between 1964 and 2012", which included material showing that police had received intelligence about Savile's sexual conduct dating back to 1963.

=== Investigations in Jersey ===
On 7 November 2012, it was announced that an inquiry would also be undertaken, by a senior legal figure from outside the island, into allegations that Savile had abused children at Haut de la Garenne in Jersey.

=== West Yorkshire Police report ===
On 10 May 2013, West Yorkshire Police published a report into the relationship of the force with Savile. It concluded that he had not been protected from arrest or prosecution, but that there had been an "over-reliance on personal friendships" between Savile and some officers. The report states that there are "currently 76 crimes involving 68 victims committed in the West Yorkshire area relating to Savile", but none of them was reported to the police before his death. Nine of the incidents relate to persons under the age of nine, the youngest being aged five. A copy of the report was to be passed to the Independent Police Complaints Commission.

=== North Yorkshire Police report ===
On 18 December 2014, North Yorkshire Police published a report of an internal inquiry into its actions. The inquiry, termed Operation Hibiscus, found no evidence of misconduct by officers, but also concluded that opportunities had been missed to prosecute both Savile and Peter Jaconelli, a former mayor of Scarborough who died in 1999, for child sex abuse. The report stated that 32 allegations had been made against Jaconelli, and five against Savile. Jaconelli was stripped of civic honours earlier in 2014 after allegations against him were first published by the North Yorks Enquirer. The Assistant Chief Constable of North Yorkshire Police, Paul Kennedy, said that the report showed that there would have been sufficient evidence for the Crown Prosecution Service to consider criminal charges against both Savile and Jaconelli if they were still alive.

=== Surrey Police report ===
On 29 April 2015, Surrey Police published a report stating that Savile had sexually assaulted 22 students and a visitor at the Duncroft Approved School for Girls in Staines-upon-Thames between 1974 and 1979. The report said that Savile had committed at least 46 offences at the school, including one which would have been classed as rape under current law.

== Department of Health investigations ==
The Department of Health announced that former barrister Kate Lampard would chair the department's investigations into Savile's activities at Stoke Mandeville Hospital, Leeds General Infirmary, Broadmoor Hospital and other hospitals and facilities in England. In October 2013 the Secretary of State for Health, Jeremy Hunt, announced that inquiries had been extended to other, unnamed hospitals. As of November 2013, the list of hospitals investigated included:

1. Barnet Hospital
2. Booth Hall Children's Hospital
3. Broadmoor Hospital
4. Cardiff Royal Infirmary
5. De la Pole Hospital
6. Dewsbury Hospital
7. Dryburn Hospital
8. Exeter Hospital
9. Great Ormond Street Hospital, London
10. Hammersmith Hospital
11. High Royds Psychiatric Hospital
12. Leavesden Secure Mental Hospital
13. Leeds General Infirmary
14. Marsden Hospital
15. Maudsley Hospital
16. Moss Side Hospital (formerly part of Ashworth Hospital)
17. North Manchester General Hospital
18. Odstock Hospital
19. Pinderfields Hospital
20. Portsmouth Hospital
21. Prestwich Psychiatric Hospital
22. Queen Mary's Hospital, Carshalton
23. Queen Victoria Hospital, East Grinstead
24. Rampton Hospital
25. Royal Free Hospital
26. Royal Victoria Infirmary, Newcastle
27. Saxondale Hospital
28. Seacroft Hospital, Leeds
29. St Catherine's Hospital, Birkenhead
30. Stoke Mandeville Hospital
31. Whitby Memorial Hospital
32. Wythenshawe Hospital

=== Findings ===
The results of the investigations were made public on 26 June 2014. The report concluded that Savile sexually assaulted victims in NHS hospitals over several decades. At Leeds General Infirmary, 60 people, including both staff and patients, stated that they had been abused by Savile, their ages ranging from 5 to 75. It reported on a number of organisational failures which had allowed him to continue unchallenged. Hunt apologised to the victims of the assaults, and said that the findings "will shake our country to the core".

It was reported that Savile had boasted to nurses and other staff that he performed sex acts on the bodies of recently deceased persons in the mortuary of Leeds General Hospital and claimed to have removed glass eyes from corpses and made them into rings. The report says "We have no way of proving Savile's claims that he interfered with the bodies of the deceased patients in the mortuary in this way" but that Savile did have unsupervised access to the mortuary.

A separate report on Savile's activities at Stoke Mandeville Hospital, prepared by independent investigator Dr Androulla Johnstone and published on 26 February 2015, found that he had sexually abused more than 50 people there, including staff, patients and visitors. One was an 8-year-old child. Savile had full access to all parts of the hospital. The report stated that it was widely known at the hospital that Savile was a "sex pest", and that 10 complaints had been made at the time, but no action was taken.

Also published on 26 February 2015 was Kate Lampard's report into lessons to be learned from the health service's handling of the Savile scandal. The report comprised a summary of findings from 44 separate NHS investigations into Jimmy Savile's conduct across various hospitals. It concluded that the evidence "indicates that there are many elements of the Savile story that could be repeated in the future", and that hospitals needed to be aware of the risks of "people who seek to gain undue influence and power within public institutions".

==== Savile's brother ====
Another NHS investigation reported in 2015 on allegations of assaults by Savile's older brother Johnny at Springfield University Hospital in south London from 1978 to 1980, prior to his dismissal in 1980 and death in 1998. Investigators believed that at least one such assault occurred and that others were likely or most likely. The chief executive of the hospital trust offered his "heartfelt apologies to the victims".

== Department for Education ==
A report for the Department for Education reached no firm conclusions over whether Savile had abused children or staff when visiting schools and children's homes, or hosting shows at which they had been invited to attend, between the 1960s and 1980s. The report, published on 26 February 2015, brought together the findings of various investigations carried out by local authorities, charities and schools. The Children's Minister, Edward Timpson, said that, though information had been received from credible sources, there was insufficient corroborating evidence to draw firm conclusions.

== Call for single inquiry ==
On 8 November 2012, the Shadow Home Secretary, Yvette Cooper, called in Parliament for a single, overarching public inquiry to examine all recent allegations of child abuse, including those relating to the North Wales child abuse scandal and those related to Savile. This was supported by former minister Tim Loughton and the NSPCC.

An overarching panel inquiry was announced by the Home Secretary, Theresa May, in July 2014, to examine how the country's institutions had handled their duty of care to protect children from sexual abuse. It was to be led by an independent panel of experts, and was to be chaired by Baroness Butler-Sloss. On 14 July it was announced that Baroness Butler-Sloss was standing down, and that a new chair would be appointed. On 5 September it was announced that it would be chaired by Fiona Woolf but on 31 October 2014 she too resigned from the role. On 4 February 2015 May announced that the inquiry would be chaired by Justice Lowell Goddard, a New Zealand High Court judge, and would be given new powers as a statutory inquiry. Dame Goddard resigned the chair of the Inquiry on 4 August 2016 to return to New Zealand but the Inquiry's work continued. Dame Goddard later said that she was prevented from selecting her own staff and the Shirley Oaks Survivors Association withdrew from the Inquiry over concerns about its true independence.

== Aftermath ==
Savile's ornate black granite and steel headstone

Savile's ornate black granite and steel headstone stood for just 19 days. It was unveiled on 20 September 2012, but Savile's family asked "out of respect to public opinion" and to others buried in and visiting the cemetery, that his gravestone be taken from the cemetery where his body is buried. Scarborough Borough Council and funeral directors removed it "under cover of night" and sent it to landfill. Savile's body remains interred in the cemetery in Scarborough, as although it was proposed that it be exhumed and cremated, the campaign was unsuccessful due to the charities who received the money from Savile's will rejecting the cost of £20,000.

Vivian Savile, one of Savile's nephews, reportedly died from shock over the revelations.

Savile's inscription in the wall of Leeds Civic Hall was removed in October 2012. In the same month a café at Stoke Mandeville Hospital, originally called "Jimmy's" and displaying a neon sign in the shape of Savile's signature, was renamed 'Cafe@WRVS'. Cunard cancelled a sail-past tribute to Savile's burial place at Scarborough, scheduled for 15:00 BST on 1 August 2013. The University of Bedfordshire stripped Savile of the honorary degree it had awarded him in 2009 and the University of Leeds revoked the honorary doctorate it had awarded him in 1986. Savile's name was removed from the Great North Run Hall of Fame.

On 23 October 2012, two registered charities, the Jimmy Savile Charitable Trust and the Jimmy Savile Stoke Mandeville Hospital Trust, set up to "provide funds for the relief of poverty and sickness and other charitable purposes beneficial to the community", announced they would close and have their funds redistributed to other charities.

It was reported on 28 October 2012 that Savile's cottage in Glen Coe had been spray-painted with slogans and the door damaged. The cottage had been searched by police looking for evidence of others involved with him in abuse. Plans to sell the cottage early in 2012 were halted by Savile's charitable trust, which had planned to turn it into a respite centre for the disabled. These plans were in turn halted when the trust announced it would close. The cottage was sold at auction on 30 May 2013.

On 2 November, it was reported that letters had been sent to Savile's estate, the BBC, Stoke Mandeville Hospital, Broadmoor, and Leeds General Infirmary by solicitors acting on behalf of 20 clients who claimed to have been abused by Savile, and that legal action against them was being considered.

Also on 2 November, the BBC confirmed it would no longer air repeats of Top of the Pops which featured Savile as a presenter. It was claimed that Savile had groped a 19-year-old audience member on air, during an edition of the show broadcast on 25 November 1976.

A 2001 episode of the children's programme Tweenies on CBeebies showed the group starting their own band and character Max introducing the band to the audience in a parody of Top of The Pops, having a hairstyle similar to Savile's, wearing a tracksuit and also using some of his catchphrases. Following a repeat airing of the episode in January 2013, the BBC received over 200 complaints. The BBC apologised and said that the episode would not be broadcast again.

In 2013, Simon Hulme won a prize for a photo of a frail Savile four days before he died, dubbed the last photo taken of him.

The Blu-ray set release of Season 22 of Doctor Who included "A Fix With Sontarans", a mini-episode of the show which featured Colin Baker as the Sixth Doctor. This had originally appeared on Jim'll Fix It and had aired on 23 February 1985. The edited version contained in the set excluded the ending, in which Savile appeared.

== In popular culture ==
In June 2015, a stage play regarding the scandal was premiered at Park Theatre in Finsbury Park, London. Titled An Audience with Jimmy Savile, it was written by Jonathan Maitland and starred Alistair McGowan as the title character.

In 2016 an episode of series 3 of the TV programme Line of Duty, had a photo of Savile doctored to include two of the programme's characters, implying that they were all part of the same child abuse ring.

"The Landlord's Daughter", a 2019 episode of the Alfred Pennyworth prequel TV series Pennyworth, depicted a televised public hanging of a man with long blond hair named James Savile, said to have committed "rape, sodomy and murder".

In April 2022, Netflix released Jimmy Savile: A British Horror Story, a two-part documentary detailing Savile's life, public image, and criminal activity. During an interview with journalist Alison Bellamy, she shared letters that had been exchanged between Savile and members of the British royal family where Savile had acted as an unofficial advisor. Prince Charles in particular valued Savile's opinion dearly and in 1989 expressed his desire for his "office to 'consult' Savile before his meetings". There was no indication that the royal family was aware of Savile's predatory behaviour.

In October 2023, the BBC broadcast a mini-series, The Reckoning, which recounted Savile's career and crimes. It was written by Neil McKay with Jeff Pope as its executive producer, and starred Steve Coogan as Savile.

The film 28 Years Later (2025) and its follow-up sequel, The Bone Temple (2026) depicts a cult styled after Savile.

== See also ==
- BBC controversies
- Criticism of the BBC
- Institutional abuse
- Johnny Kitagawa sexual abuse scandal
