= Barnet Hospital =

- Royal Free London NHS Foundation Trust
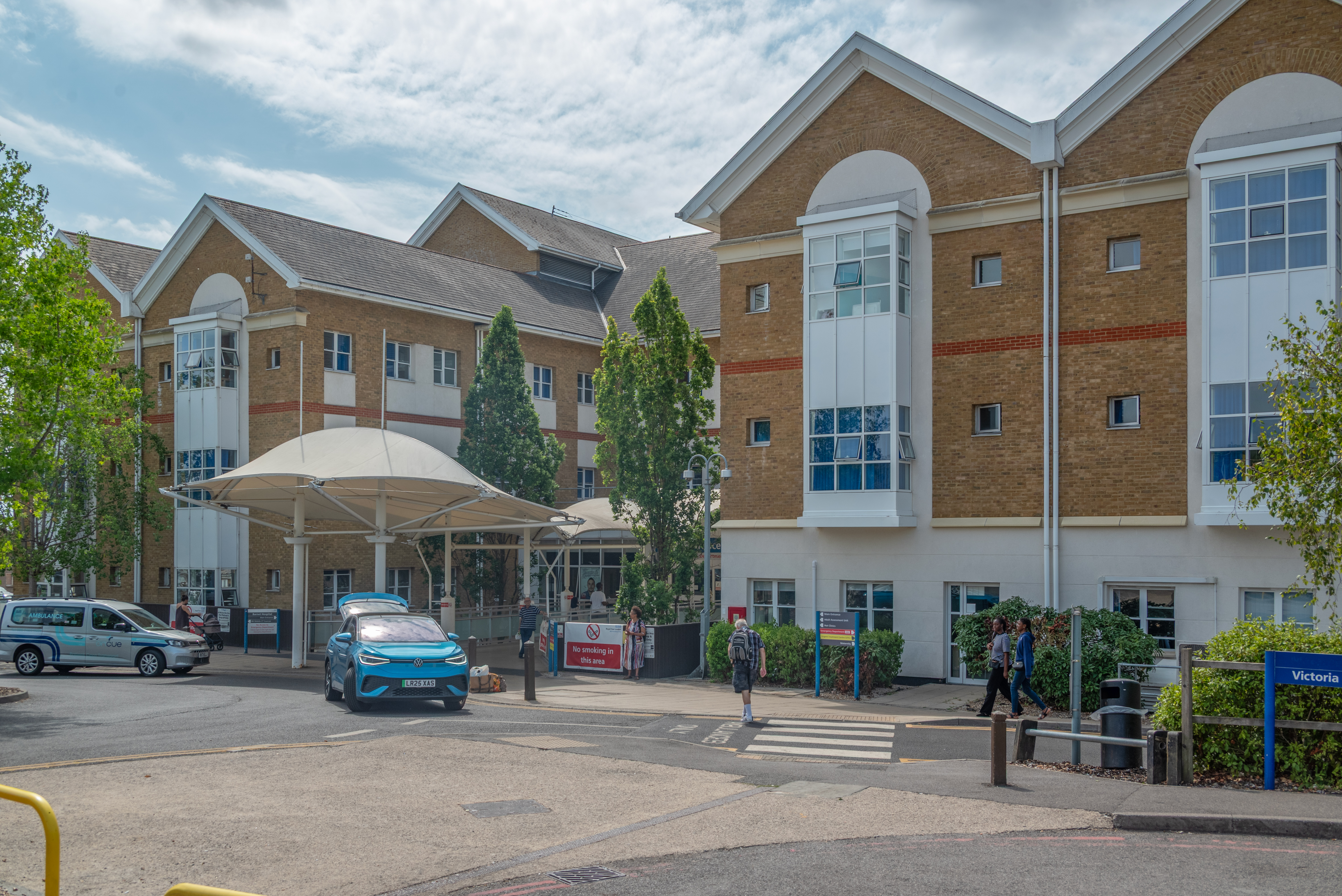
- Barnet Hospital

- Location within Barnet

Geography
- Location: Wellhouse Lane, Chipping Barnet EN5 3DJ, London, England
- Coordinates: 51.6505°N 0.2141°W

Organisation
- Care system: NHS England
- Type: District General

Services
- Emergency department: Yes
- Beds: 459

History
- Founded: November 1920; 105 years ago

Links
- Website: www.royalfree.nhs.uk/barnet-hospital/
- Lists: Hospitals in England

Barnet Hospital is a district general hospital situated in Barnet, in North London. It is managed by the Royal Free London NHS Foundation Trust.

The hospital has its origins in the Wellhouse Hospital which opened in 1920 and became the Barnet General Hospital in 1950. The Barnet General Hospital was replaced by a new hospital, procured under the private finance initiative in the late 20th century. The new facility, which offers a complete range of services, was built by Bouygues and opened as Barnet Hospital in 2002. The hospital, which is well served by local bus services, was evaluated as good by the Care Quality Commission in 2016. Barnet Hospital was being investigated in relation to the Jimmy Savile sexual abuse scandal in 2013.

== Overview ==
The original hospital on the site was the Wellhouse Hospital which was opened by Viscount Hampden, the Lord Lieutenant of Hertfordshire, in November 1920. It was renamed Barnet General Hospital in 1950.

The rebuilding of the hospital was procured under a Private Finance Initiative contract in 1999. The works were designed by the Percy Thomas Partnership and carried out by Bouygues at a cost of £54 million. They were completed in February 2002 and the new facilities were opened by the Princess Royal in February 2003. Barnet General Hospital became Barnet Hospital at that time.

The new facilities provided include accident and emergency care, intensive care, internal medicine, surgery, gynecology, orthopaedics, anesthetics, haematology, stroke medicine, dermatology, paediatrics and genito-urinary medicine.

Since July 2014, the hospital has been part of the Royal Free London NHS Foundation Trust along with Chase Farm Hospital.

== Transport links ==
Barnet Hospital is served by London Buses routes 107, 263, 307, 384, school routes 606, 634, night route N20 and non-TfL routes 614 and 243. The closest Underground station is High Barnet, which is a 25-minute walk away. On site parking has been highlighted by Which? as having the highest minimum charge in the country.

== CQC evaluation ==
The Care Quality Commission rated Barnet General Hospital as "good" overall in August 2016. The findings of the report are summarised in the table below:

	Safe	Effective	Caring	Responsive	Well-led	Overall
Urgent and emergency services	Good	Good	Good	Good	Good	Good
Medical care	Good	Good	Good	Good	Good	Good
Surgery	Good	Good	Good	Good	Good	Good
Critical care	Good	Good	Good	Requires improvement	Good	Good
Maternity and gynaecology	Good	Good	Good	Good	Good	Good
Services for children and young people	Good	Good	Good	Good	Good	Good
End of life care	Good	Good	Good	Good	Good	Good
Outpatients and diagnostic imaging	Good	Not rated	Good	Good	Good	Good
Overall	Good	Good	Good	Good	Good	Good

== Abuse inquiries ==
In November 2013, the Health Secretary Jeremy Hunt announced that Barnet Hospital was being investigated in relation to the Jimmy Savile sexual abuse scandal. The subsequent NHS and DoH investigation concluded that following an extensive search of Trust and public archives, the investigating team found no record of JS being involved with BH, either through fund raising events, VIP visits or charitable donations.

== See also ==
- List of hospitals in England
