= Mark Stanley =

English actor

- Born: Mark Robert Speight; Leeds, West Yorkshire, England
- Education: Guildhall School of Music and Drama
- Occupation: Actor
- Years active: 2010–present

Mark Robert Speight, known professionally as Mark Stanley, is an English actor. He is best known for his roles in Game of Thrones and Dickensian, and as Rob Hepworth in the third series of BBC drama Happy Valley.

== Early life and education ==
Mark Robert Speight was born in Leeds. He attended Allerton High School and Prince Henry's Grammar School, Otley, where he began acting. He graduated from the Guildhall School of Music and Drama in 2010.

== Filmography ==
Key
†	Denotes works that have not yet been released

=== Film ===
Year	Title	Role
2013	How I Live Now	Chasing Man
2014	Mr. Turner	Clarkson Stanfield
2014	Kajaki	Tug
2015	Star Wars: The Force Awakens	Knight of Ren
2016	Our Kind of Traitor	Ollie
2017	Euphoria	Brian
2017	Dark River	Joe Bell
2019	Hellboy	Arthur
2019	Run	Finnie
2020	Sulphur and White	David Tait
2020	Small Axe: "Red, White and Blue"	Ed Harrigan
2023	The Settlers	Alexander MacLennan
2023	My Mother's Wedding	Charlie

=== Television ===
Year	Title	Role	Notes
2011–2014	Game of Thrones	Grenn	22 episodes
2015–2016	Dickensian	Bill Sikes	14 episodes
2017	Broken	PC Andrew Powell	5 episodes
2017	Love, Lies and Records	James	6 episodes
2017	Little Women	Professor Bhaer	1 episode
2018	The Little Drummer Girl	Arthur A. Halloran	1 episode
2019–2020	Criminal: UK	DC Hugo Duffy	4 episodes
2019	Sanditon	Lord Babington	8 episodes
2019	Elizabeth Is Missing	Frank Jefford	TV film
2020	White House Farm	Colin Caffell	TV mini-series
2020	Honour	DS Andy Craig	TV mini-series; 2 episodes
2021	Anne Boleyn	Henry VIII	Mini-series
2021	The Bay	Warren Pryce	Series 3
2022–2024	Trigger Point	DI Thom Youngblood	12 episodes
2022	The Thief, His Wife and the Canoe	Mark Darwin	Mini-series; 4 episodes
2023	Happy Valley	Rob Hepworth	Series 3; 6 episodes
2023	The Reckoning	Dan Davies	Mini-series; 4 episodes
2025	Adolescence	Paul Barlow	Mini-series; "Episode 1"
2025	A Cruel Love: The Ruth Ellis Story	Desmond Cussen	Historical drama
2026	Under Salt Marsh	Danny	Mini series
2026	The Witness	DS Ivan Agnew	Upcoming series
2026	Secret Service	Ryan Walker	
