= Ann Ebsworth =

British barrister and judge

Dame Ann Ebsworth

Dame Ann Marian Ebsworth, DBE (19 May 1937 – 4 April 2002) was an English barrister and judge. In 1992, she became the sixth female High Court judge, and the first to be assigned to the Queen's Bench Division.

== Biography ==
Ebsworth's mother was Hilda Mary, (born Sullivan) and her father, Arthur Ebsworth, was an officer in the Royal Marines. They were living in Southsea when she was born in the Royal Naval and Royal Marine Maternity Home, but early life was spent in various barracks. She was educated at Notre Dame Convent, Worth, West Sussex, and at Portsmouth High School. She read history at Royal Holloway College, University of London, where she was a formidable debater, captaining teams in intercollegiate contests.

She was called to the Bar at Gray's Inn in 1962, where she was later a bencher. She practised mainly in Liverpool, concentrating on criminal work. She became head of her chambers, but did not become a QC. She became a Recorder in the Crown Court in 1978, and a circuit judge in 1983. She served on the Mental Health Review Tribunal from 1975 to 1983, and on the Parole Board from 1989 to 1992.

She was appointed a High Court judge in 1992, becoming the sixth female High Court judge after Elizabeth Lane, Rose Heilbron, Margaret Booth, Elizabeth Butler-Sloss and Joyanne Bracewell. All previous female High Court judges were appointed to the Family Division.

In 1992 Ebsworth was the first woman to be assigned to the Queen's Bench Division. On 20 May 1992, the day after her 55th birthday, Ebsworth was appointed a Dame Commander of the Order of the British Empire (DBE).

In later life, she was involved in teaching advocacy at Gray's Inn, and for the South Eastern Circuit, particularly at an annual course at Keble College, Oxford.

== Death ==
She retired in 2001. She died of peritoneal mesothelioma, a rare form of cancer. She died on 4 April 2002, aged 64, unmarried.

Her funeral service was held at Gray's Inn on 10 April 2002.

== Legacy ==
- She left £1 million to the Institute of Child Health to fund research under the auspices of the Ann Ebsworth Centre for Childhood Epilepsy, at Great Ormond Street Hospital.
- The Dame Ann Ebsworth Memorial Lectures are held annually at the Inner Temple in her memory.
