= Mark Watts (journalist) =

Mark Watts is the former editor-in-chief of the defunct investigative news website Exaro. Watts left Exaro in 2016 and it closed later that year after having published reports on sexual abuse and murder allegations from Carl Beech. These allegations spurred Operation Midland and were ultimately deemed false.

== Career ==
Watts started his career at the Hull Daily Mail in 1988. He later joined the Sunday Express, before making a move into television to work on The Big Story for ITV in 1994. He went on to make documentaries for Yorkshire Television and World in Action before returning to print media in 1997. From 1997–2001 he was head of investigations for Sunday Business.

In 2001, Watts founded the FOIA Centre, which specialises in research using 'open-access' laws.

Watts later hosted the live daily news show "Between the Headlines" on Press TV, in which he invited politicians, senior journalists and commentators to join him in reviewing the day's newspapers.

He is the author of The Fleet Street Sewer Rat (2005), an investigative book which describes the scavenging techniques used by bin raider Benji Pell. Nick Davies, a journalist from The Guardian, attended the Leveson Inquiry as a witness and described The Fleet Street Sewer Rat as "the best single source, hugely detailed, of information about the dark arts of journalism."

In an October 2012 interview with The Guardian Watts said he wanted to bring investigative techniques back into the heart of news gathering operations. He told the Guardian's John Plunkett there is an "increasing feeling both in broadcasting and in newspapers that [investigative journalism] wasn't worth the resources, that it takes too much time and money and the readership was not that interested... most journalists spend their time rewriting press releases and wire copy."

In July 2014, LBC talk radio presenter James O'Brien told Watts on air that "the door to his studio was always open" if Watts ever wanted to talk about Exaro's investigations on air. He made the offer during a half-hour interview with Watts about a recent Exaro investigation into organised child sex abuse.

False allegations of sex crimes and murder committed by a VIP paedophile ring made by Carl Beech (then known under the pseudonym "Nick") were first reported by Exaro in 2014. These allegations later became the basis for the Metropolitan Police Service's Operation Midland, a £2 million probe which closed in 2016 with no charges being brought. Exaro also closed in 2016. Beech was convicted of charges related to his false claims in July 2019 and was jailed for 18 years. Harvey Proctor, who was falsely accused of child sex abuse by Beech, described Exaro as Beech's "support team" but Watts stood by Exaro's coverage and said they "never asserted" that Beech's claims were true. After Beech's conviction, Watts said he did not think Beech got a fair trial because the judge had allowed jurors to hear that he had pleaded guilty to child pornography offences in a separate trial.

== Books ==
- Mark Watts (2005), The Fleet Street Sewer Rat, Artnik
