= Sidney Cooke =

English sex offender (born 1927)

- Born: Sidney Charles Cooke; 18 April 1927 (age 99); Stroud, Gloucestershire, England
- Other name: Hissing Sid
- Occupations: Farm labourer, fairground worker
- Status: Incarcerated
- Motive: Paedophilia
- Penalty: 2 × life sentences

Details
- Date: 1960s–1980s
- Locations: Hackney, east London and other parts of England
- Target: Young boys
- Killed: Jason Swift; others suspected
- Weapon: Drugs
- Imprisoned at: HMP Wakefield

Sidney Charles Cooke (born 18 April 1927) is an English convicted child molester, murderer and suspected serial killer and serial rapist serving two life sentences. He was the leader of a child sex ring suspected of up to twenty child murders of young boys in the 1970s and 1980s. Cooke and other members of the ring were convicted of three killings in total, although he was only convicted of one himself.

In June 2025, at the age of 98, Cooke broke the record as the oldest prisoner to ever have a parole hearing in the UK, and very likely the world. As of 2026, at age 99, he is the oldest inmate imprisoned in the world. He is also the second-oldest ever to be held in custody in British history, following Ralph Clarke who died in 2021 near the age of 105.

Cooke is suspected by police of killing the three boys with the ring; he was named by gang member Leslie Bailey as the killer of Mark Tildesley in 1984 when Bailey confessed to the murder, and he is also suspected to have been involved in the murder of 6-year-old Barry Lewis which Bailey was also convicted of. Cooke's gang have also been the subject of several investigations into possible links to the disappearances of two boys, Martin Allen and Vishal Mehrotra, who were abducted from London in 1979 and 1981 respectively.

Cooke, a fairground worker, was nicknamed Hissing Sid by colleagues, and was described by The Guardian newspaper in 1999 as "Britain's most notorious paedophile".

== Early life ==
Cooke was born on 18 April 1927 in Stroud, Gloucestershire. He initially worked as a farm labourer before finding work as a fairground worker, which made it easy for him to move around the United Kingdom. As part of his system to lure young boys, Cooke set up a child's version of the high striker amusement.

== "Dirty Dozen" ==
In the 1970s, Cooke and a group of approximately twelve men began hiring rent boys and abducting young male children off the streets. The victims were drugged, raped and abused in group orgies. By the mid-1980s, the group had acquired a flat on the Kingsmead housing estate in Hackney, east London.

=== Gang rape and killing of Jason Swift ===
In November 1985, a group led by Cooke had gang raped 14-year-old Jason Swift (born 1 March 1971) in what the media described as a homosexual orgy. After Swift's body was found in a shallow grave by a dog walker, an investigation by the Metropolitan Police led to the arrest of Cooke along with three accomplices: Leslie Bailey, Robert Oliver and Steven Barrell. On 12 May 1989, Cooke was sentenced at the Old Bailey to nineteen years in Wandsworth Prison for the manslaughter of Swift. The group were originally charged with murder before all were convicted of manslaughter.

Oliver received a lesser sentence of fifteen years, but was released from prison after eight and changed his name to Karl Curtis. In July 2013, he was jailed for three years after being found guilty of luring children into his home in Maidstone, Kent. This was due to the breach of a court order which banned him from having unsupervised contact with children.

=== Murder of Mark Tildesley ===
Bailey and other gang members told authorities that Cooke was among those who murdered Mark Tildesley, a seven-year-old boy, in Wokingham, Berkshire on 1 June 1984. Bailey claimed that Tildesley was lured away from a Wokingham funfair by Cooke on the promise of a 50p bag of sweets. In 1991, the Crown Prosecution Service (CPS) declined to prosecute Cooke for Tildesley's murder as he was already in prison for the manslaughter of Swift. As Bailey was the only one who confessed to Tildesley's murder, the CPS decided to only formally press charges against him for the killing despite him and other gang members naming Cooke as the perpetrator, as fellow child sex offenders are not considered reliable witnesses in a court of law. Despite this, Bailey's trial was highly unusual in that it explicitly named Cooke and another man, Lennie Smith, as the killers, despite them having not been charged. Cooke's role in the murder was not fully investigated until 1999, after Cooke's release from prison; by this time, Bailey had been murdered in prison in October 1993. Cooke has indicated he knows where Tildesley's body is buried but refuses to disclose the exact location.

=== Murder of Barry Lewis ===
Cooke is also suspected of involvement in the murder of another boy, six-year-old Barry Lewis, for which Bailey was convicted in June 1991. Lewis had been snatched from the street while playing with friends in Walworth, south London, on 15 September 1985. His body was found in Essex in April 1986, only four days from the discovery of Swift's body.

In 1990, Bailey confessed to police that Cooke's gang had abducted, drugged and raped Lewis before Bailey had been tasked with disposing of the body the next day. Bailey told police detailed information about the murder which confirmed his testimony as genuine, and led police to the location of Lewis's grave. As with Tildesley, Bailey implicated Cooke in Lewis's murder. Although he was the only one convicted in the murders of Lewis and Tildesley, police believed Cooke was the leader of the gang.

=== Operation Orchid ===
While in prison, Cooke reportedly boasted of his ring killing "about fifteen" children to cellmates. Members of the ring also reportedly made references to killing Lewis, whose murder was at this point still unsolved but of which detectives on the Swift enquiry were already aware. One prisoner, Ian Gabb, felt so disgusted by the confessions that he volunteered to give information to the authorities. Police set up Operation Orchid to further investigate murders that could be linked to the ring.

Gabb informed police that a ring member named Lennie Smith had been involved in the group's murders along with Cooke. Police subsequently put Smith under surveillance, and he was soon arrested for indecent assault on a child in a public toilet. Gabb also provided detectives with maps he had drawn based on the descriptions of where the ring members claimed they had buried their victims, to which police responded by searching several sites of interest. Operation Orchid officers eventually solved the then unsolved murders of Tildesley and Lewis after Bailey formally confessed. Gabb volunteered to remain in prison longer than his own sentence to continue assisting the police, and was later rewarded by being given a reduced sentence.

=== Appeal and parole ===
Cooke's sentence for the manslaughter of Swift was reduced to sixteen years on appeal in 1989, and he was paroled nine years later in April 1998. He told an appeals court that Bailey was the ringleader of the gang. Cooke's parole caused huge public outrage, which was exacerbated by a plan to move him to a hostel near two schools, and that he admitted that he might re-offend if he was released. While in prison, Cooke refused to take part in any rehabilitation sessions. Police refused to disclose the location to which he was to be moved, smuggling him out of prison to avoid a vigil for his victims. For the next nine months, Cooke lived in a suite of cells at Yeovil police station at his own request, rarely venturing out in public.

=== 1970s offences, re-arrest ===
Following an investigation by the Channel 4 documentary programme Dispatches on 29 October 1998, Thames Valley Police reopened investigations concerning alleged sex offences by Cooke. He was arrested on 26 January 1999. Three days later, Cooke was charged at Reading police station with committing eighteen sex offences which occurred between 1972 and 1981 in south London, Berkshire, Kent, Tyne and Wear and Hertfordshire; he was moved back to prison on remand. Many of the offences had come to public attention after they were disclosed in the Channel 4 documentary.

At his trial at Manchester Crown Court on 5 October 1999, Cooke pleaded guilty to all but eight of the charges, which were four counts of rape, three counts of indecent assault, and one of buggery that occurred in 1981. These were abandoned by the judge, who ordered them to lie on file. Following Cooke's sentencing, NSPCC director Jim Harding said:

The children who were abused by Sidney Cooke suffered some of the vilest and cruelest sex offences imaginable. He should never have been freed after serving his last sentence. We sincerely hope he will never be given the opportunity to hurt another child again.

On 17 December 1999, at Wolverhampton Crown Court, Cooke received two life sentences, and Judge David Poole told Cooke that he would only be considered for release after he had served a minimum of five years in prison and if the parole board was satisfied he was not a danger to the public.

== Aftermath ==
Since his five-year minimum term expired in January 2004, he has been refused parole 12 times due to being of very high risk.

=== Investigations into other possible victims ===
Roger Stoodley, who retired as the detective leading the Cooke investigation in 1992, stated in 2014 that the unsolved disappearances and murders of two other boys, Vishal Mehrotra and Martin Allen, were in keeping with the Cooke gang's modus operandi. The gang were known to have abducted boys whom they found walking on their own.

=== Disappearance of Martin Allen ===
Martin Allen
- Born: Martin Duncan Allen; 19 October 1964; Islington, London, England
- Disappeared: 5 November 1979 (aged 15)

On 5 November 1979, 15-year-old Martin Allen travelled home from school on the London Underground. His intention was to go to see his older brother, Bob, who lived near Holloway Road, but he needed to go home first in order to collect some money. At around 3:50 pm, he said goodbye to some school friends at King's Cross station and set off in the direction of the Piccadilly line platform to travel home. This was the last confirmed sighting of Allen.

After a televised appeal five weeks after Allen's disappearance, a male witness came forward to report seeing a man accompanying a boy acting suspiciously at Gloucester Road station at 4:15 pm, about half an hour after Martin vanished. The witness reported that the man was standing with his arm around the shoulder of the boy, who resembled Allen. The boy appeared distressed and both parties appeared to be nervous as they got onto a train. The witness saw the man prod the boy in the back, and overheard him telling the boy not to try to run when the pair left the train at Earl's Court station. The witness described the man as six feet tall, in his thirties, well built, with very blonde hair and a moustache, and wearing a denim jacket and trousers.

In 2012, police initiated a number of new investigations into child abuse allegations dating back over the previous thirty years. This included a re-investigation of claims of systemic child abuse by an alleged pedophile ring at Elm Guest House during the 1970s and 1980s. The location of Elm Guest House, along with the alleged activities of the individuals involved there, have led to media speculation that Allen was abused and murdered by child sexual abusers operating there. In May 2016, Operation Malswick superseded Operation Midland and was formed specifically to re-investigate Allen's case. Police questioned Cooke.

=== Death of Vishal Mehrotra ===
Vishal Mehrotra
- Born: 27 September 1972; India
- Disappeared: 29 July 1981 (aged 8); Putney, London, England, UK
- Body discovered: 25 February 1982

On 29 July 1981, after watching the wedding of Prince Charles and Lady Diana Spencer in London, 8-year-old Vishal Mehrotra's family returned to East Putney by train, where they arrived around 1:40 pm. Vishal said he was tired and wanted to walk home by himself; Vishal's parents reported him missing at 7 pm to the Metropolitan Police.

On 25 February 1982, two men discovered a skull, seven ribs and some vertebrae at Alder Copse, Durleigh Marsh Farm, Rogate, near Petersfield. The bones appeared to have been disturbed by foxes and were found buried in a bog at a depth of around two feet. A large scale excavation uncovered more bones, but no clothing. Initially, police believed that the body had been buried around 29 July 1981.

In the late 1980s, a Metropolitan Police unit that had been investigating Cooke's child sex ring began to investigate whether Mehrotra could have been another of the gang's victims. The gang was known to have killed at least three similarly aged boys after abducting them in London in the 1980s, and always abducted them in broad daylight like in Mehrotra's case. It also appeared from Mehrotra's remains that he had been buried naked, indicating a sexual element to the killing. The "Dirty Dozen" investigative team held a meeting with Sussex Police at the time but no concrete evidence was found to link the enquiries.

In March 2015, the BBC reported that the Metropolitan Police had referred itself to the Independent Police Complaints Commission following allegations of corruption in relation to the case. Subsequently, in May 2015, Sussex Police released documents relating to a review of the murder they had carried out in 2005. The force's report on the case revealed that other police forces had in fact investigated links between Mehrotra's death and Cooke's gang on three occasions. The report also revealed that the Metropolitan Police's child sexual abuse unit had concluded there were "strong similarities" between Mehrotra's case and the gang's known killings.

== Documentaries ==
Cooke and his child sex ring were the subject of two Crimewatch File documentaries titled "The Lost Boys", which were shown on 4 October and 11 October 1994. The first documentary focused on the conviction of Cooke and the ring for the killing of Jason Swift, while the second focused on the continuing investigations into the ring's role in the murders of Mark Tildesley and Barry Lewis and Bailey's conviction for them.

== See also ==
- Child sexual abuse in the United Kingdom
- Ronald Jebson, a British serial killer who was friends with Cooke
- List of serial rapists
- List of serial killers by number of victims
- Notable inmates in HM Prison Wakefield
