= Exaro =

Exaro or Exaro News was a British website based in London between 2011 and 2016. It purportedly undertook political investigative journalism, but is now primarily known (together with its editor Mark Watts) for its direct involvement in the false allegations of sexual abuse put forward by "Nick" (Carl Beech) in Operation Midland.

== Introduction ==
Launched in October 2011, Exaro, under its motto "Holding Power to Account", claimed to specialise in "carrying out in-depth investigations". Its website claimed it 'set out to produce "evidence-based, open-access journalism – not spin, not churnalism, not hacking – just journalism about what should be transparent but isn't"'. Exaro was reportedly set up by City of London fund manager and climate denier Jerome Booth.

In articles by journalist Mark Conrad, Exaro became the first publication to report claims made by Carl Beech (under the pseudonym "Nick") that a paedophile ring composed of powerful individuals had abused children at Elm Guest House in Barnes in the late 1970s and early 1980s. MP Tom Watson (Labour), having been passed information from Exaro journalists, raised the allegations in parliament. Police subsequently launched a scoping exercise under the name "Operation Fairbank"; later, a full-scale criminal investigation specifically addressing allegations relating to Elm Guest House was launched under the name "Operation Fernbridge". The latter investigation was subsequently closed after no evidence to support the claims was found.

False allegations of sex crimes and murder committed by the fictional paedophile ring made by Beech later became the basis for the Metropolitan Police's Operation Midland, a £2 million probe which closed in 2016 with no charges brought. A later inquiry found that the accused were victims of false allegations. The Metropolitan Police Commissioner issued an apology to Beech's victims. In July 2019, Beech was convicted of charges related to his false claims and was jailed for eighteen years.

Former MP Harvey Proctor (Conservative), whose home was raided as part of the failed investigation, charged that Exaro acted as Beech's "support team". Exaro's then-editor-in-chief, Mark Watts, stood by the website's coverage and said they "never asserted" that Beech's claims were true, but also called Beech's conviction 'wholly unsafe' because he did not think Beech got a fair trial after the judge had allowed jurors to hear that he had pleaded guilty to child pornography offences in a separate trial.

Former MP John Hemming (Liberal Democrats), who had been falsely accused of abuse in an article by Exaro journalist David Hencke, succeeded in a libel action against him in January 2019, resulting in Hencke and Graham Wilmer of the Lantern Project paying over £10,000 in compensation for the false allegations. In August 2019, Staffordshire Police confirmed that they were investigating whether Hemming's accuser, Esther Baker, had misled detectives.

== Other investigations ==
=== Civil service tax avoidance ===
On 1 February 2012, an investigation by Exaro revealed that the UK's Student Loans Company was paying its chief executive, Ed Lester, through a private company, enabling him to reduce his tax bill by tens of thousands of pounds. The day after the story broke the Chief Secretary of the Treasury, Danny Alexander, was summoned to the House of Commons for an urgent debate. Alexander announced a review of all civil service contracts.

=== Rupert Murdoch ===
In partnership with Channel 4 News, Exaro revealed secretly recorded tapes of News Corporation boss Rupert Murdoch talking to journalists from the News-owned The Sun newspaper, in which he criticised the "incompetent cops" who handled the News of the World phone hacking case and promised to take care of any Sun journalist that had broken the law.

=== Military intervention in Syria ===
In July 2011, a Royal United Services Institute (RUSI) expert told Exaro that the chances of a foreign military incursion into Syria to secure chemical weapons had risen to "more than 50 per cent". That same month, Exaro also reported that hawks in the US government were pressing for military intervention to topple the regime of Syrian president Bashar al-Assad.

=== Bribery in defence contracts ===
In August 2012, the Serious Fraud Office (SFO) launched a criminal investigation into bribery allegations in connection with a UK-Saudi Arabian defence contract between the EADS subsidiary GPT Special Project Management, and the Saudi Arabian National Guard. Exaro persistently investigated the allegations, writing more than twenty stories over seven months before the SFO launched its criminal investigation.

== Criticism ==
Private Eye magazine wrote on 18 September 2015 that "Exaro is struggling to live up to its strapline of 'holding power to account.' For several months the investigative site has published no news at all apart from the latest paedo developments and, slightly bizarrely, items on a corporate insolvency monitoring service it runs alongside its 'news.' The latter centres on the supposed 'Whitehall paedophile ring' and the lurid allegations against former Tory MP Harvey Proctor, and involves magnifying the slightest procedural development and tweeting like mad under the hashtag #VIPaedophile."

Barrister Matthew Scott, a consistent critic of Exaro's modus operandi, wrote on his blog that the site "has generated a poisonous atmosphere of outrage and hysteria in which wild and immensely hurtful accusations can be made and believed on the flimsiest of evidence; and that by publicising detailed allegations of paedophile orgies and murder it has risked destroying the prospect of fair trials either for victims or defendants." A report in The Guardian stated that the conduct of Exaro had been the subject of complaints to officials supporting the Goddard Inquiry into child abuse.

Dame Janet Smith called Exaro's editors "irresponsible" following the site's publication of a leaked draft copy of her report into child sex abuse by Jimmy Savile, stating that, “Exaro’s decision appears to have been taken for its own commercial gain without any thought for the interests of the many victims of Savile or the integrity of the reporting process.”
