= Murder of Mark Tildesley =

1984 child murder in England

Mark Tildesley
- Born: 31 August 1976; Berkshire, England, UK
- Died: c. 1 June 1984; Wokingham, Berkshire, England, UK
- Cause of death: Murder by drugging, gang rape and strangulation
- Known for: Murder victim
- Parent(s): John Tildesley (1932–2005); Lavinia Tildesley (1935–2011)

Mark Anthony Tildesley (31 August 1976 – c. 1 June 1984) was a seven-year-old English child who disappeared on 1 June 1984 while visiting a funfair in Wokingham, Berkshire. A widespread search of the Wokingham area, involving both police officers and British Army soldiers, did not locate him. Thames Valley Police initially suspected that his body was buried near Wellington Road in Wokingham, near the funfair from which he was abducted, but were later reported to believe that he was probably buried in a shallow grave on abandoned farmland.

To publicise Tildesley's disappearance, a national poster campaign was launched, with one displayed in every police station in the country. The disappearance was publicised in national news and was featured in the premiere episode Crimewatch UK. Despite a massive public response, however, Tildesley was still not located.

In 1989, Tildesley's disappearance was linked to the Operation Orchid investigation into missing children. In 1990, as part of this investigation, it emerged that on the night he disappeared, Tildesley had been abducted, drugged, tortured, raped and murdered by a London-based paedophile gang led by Sidney Cooke. A member of the gang, Leslie Bailey, was charged with murder in 1991 and was given two life sentences after pleading guilty to manslaughter the following year; he was murdered in prison in 1993.

A memorial service for Tildesley was held and a memorial bench placed at the entrance to the fairground site. A headstone was also placed in a nearby burial ground.

== Background and disappearance ==
=== Mark Tildesley ===
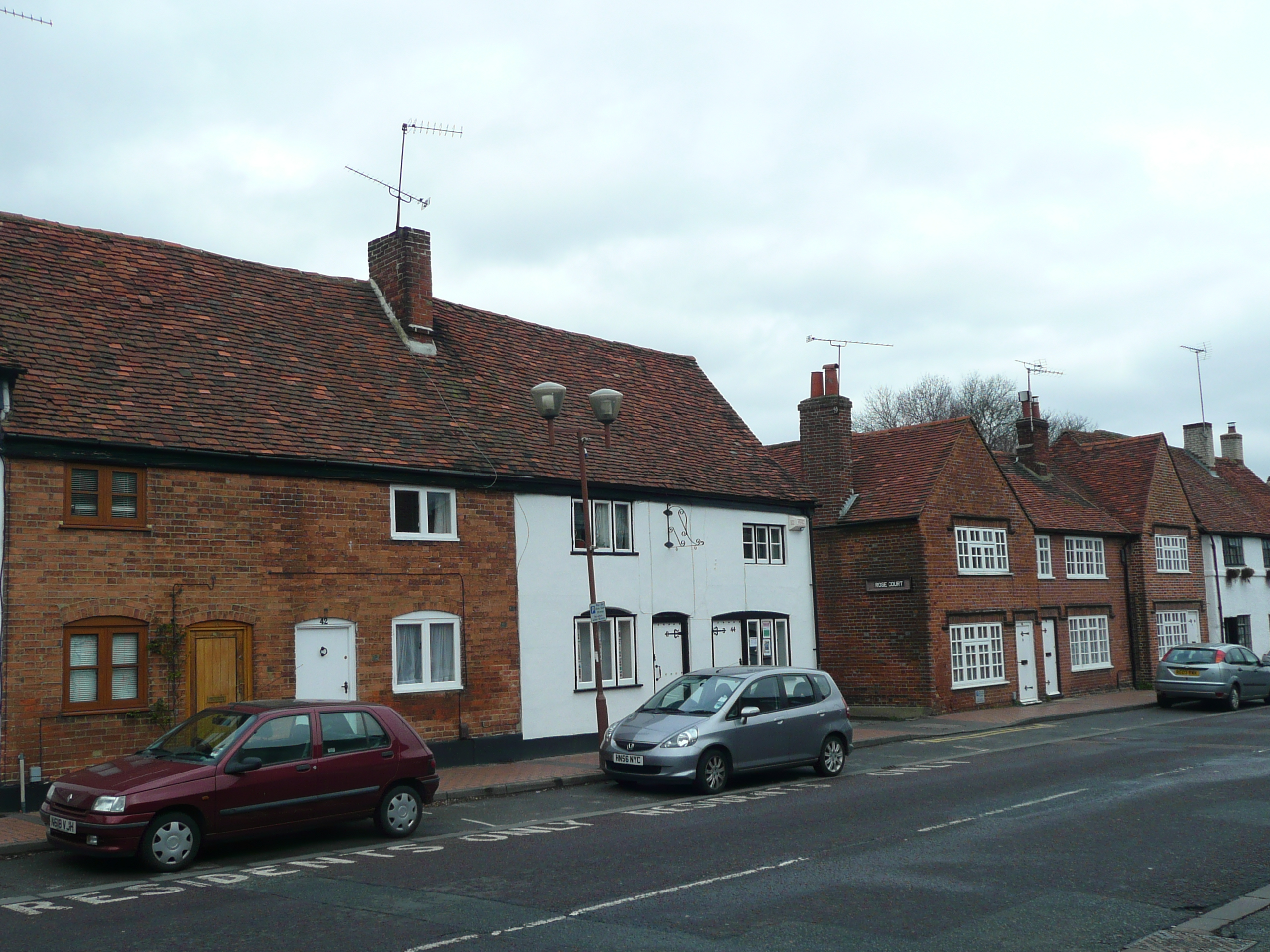
The entrance to Rose Court, off Rose Street, where the Tildesleys lived

Mark Anthony Tildesley was born on 31 August 1976 in Berkshire to John and Lavinia Tildesley. He was significantly younger than his two siblings, both of whom had moved out of the family home at Rose Court in Wokingham. Tildesley was a year 3 pupil of the Palmer C of E Junior School in the town.

=== Half-term holiday ===
On 25 May 1984, Tildesley's school had broken up for its spring half-term holiday. The Frank Ayers Fun Fair, which came to Carnival Field off Wellington Road in Wokingham four times a year, had arrived during that holiday week.

Tildesley was desperate to go to the funfair, but did not have enough money to do so. He only received 30p in pocket money every week, so he supplemented his allowance by returning trolleys from a Tesco location in Denmark Street back to where they belonged, thus collecting their customers' abandoned 10p deposits.

=== Frank Ayers Fun Fair ===
On the afternoon of 1 June 1984, Tildesley met a man outside the sweet shop on Denmark Street, who gave him a 50p coin with which to buy some sweets. The man said that he would also be at the funfair later that day and that he would pay for Tildesley to go on the dodgems, Tildesley's favourite ride.

Shortly after 5:30 pm, Tildesley left home on his bicycle to make the 1/2-mile (0.80 km) journey to the funfair, which would open at 6 pm. He promised to be back home by 7:30 pm. On his way to the fair, he met with two friends; however, they wanted to go home before heading to the funfair later. Tildesley continued alone to the fair; the meeting with the friends was the last time anyone who knew him personally saw him alive.

=== Reported missing ===
Tildesley failed to arrive home at his promised time of 7:30 pm. At 8:00 pm, his parents went to the fair to find him and discovered his bicycle chained to railings near the entrance. They returned home and at 10:00 pm Tildesley's mother reported him missing to the police.

== Searches and public appeals ==
=== Initial search ===
Thames Valley Police (TVP) undertook an intensive and thorough search of the Wokingham area, which included deploying a helicopter and searching the fairground with loud hailer appeals, as well as searching nearby watercourses. Heat-seeking equipment was also borrowed from the Metropolitan Police which could detect cadavers. Every worker and stall-holder at the funfair was questioned the day after Tildesley went missing. Wokingham town centre's 29 streets, which consisted of 960 shops, businesses, and houses, had to be covered by officers on a door-to-door basis.

On the weekend of 9–10 June 1984, fifteen policemen and two tracker dogs teamed up with 100 British Army soldiers from the Royal Electrical and Mechanical Engineers training battalion in Arborfield Garrison to search the south side of Wokingham from Barkham Road through to Amen Corner, which proved unproductive. Two weeks after the disappearance, Detective Superintendent Roger Nicklin stated that the police still had "absolutely no idea about Mark's disappearance."

=== Appeals and reconstructions ===
Shortly after Tildesley's disappearance, several witnesses reported seeing a boy who fitted his description being forcefully dragged away from the fairground by a "stooping man" between 7 pm and 8 pm that evening. Multiple further sightings were reported at the Langborough Road area of the town.

In addition to a national poster campaign being launched, with every police station in the country displaying one, Tildesley's disappearance received regional and national news coverage. On 7 June, Tildesley's disappearance was mentioned on the premiere episode of the BBC television series Crimewatch UK. These first appeals resulted in 400 calls being made to the police by members of the general public.

The day after the first Crimewatch UK broadcast, the police shot their first video reconstruction using a local seven-year-old boy dressed in clothes similar to those worn by Tildesley. Two days before the first anniversary of Tildesley's disappearance, and with the Frank Ayers Fun Fair returning to Wokingham, a second police reconstruction was filmed. These included shots in Rose Court, Rose Street, Broad Street, Denmark Street, the Carnival Field and Langborough Road. The footage was aired at 9:25 pm on 13 June 1985 on Crimewatch UK; over 1,000 people called in with information, one of the highest volumes in the programme's history. Overall, police received a massive public response with over 1,200 different individuals phoning in, who gave 2,500 potential leads.

== Investigations ==
=== Initial investigation ===
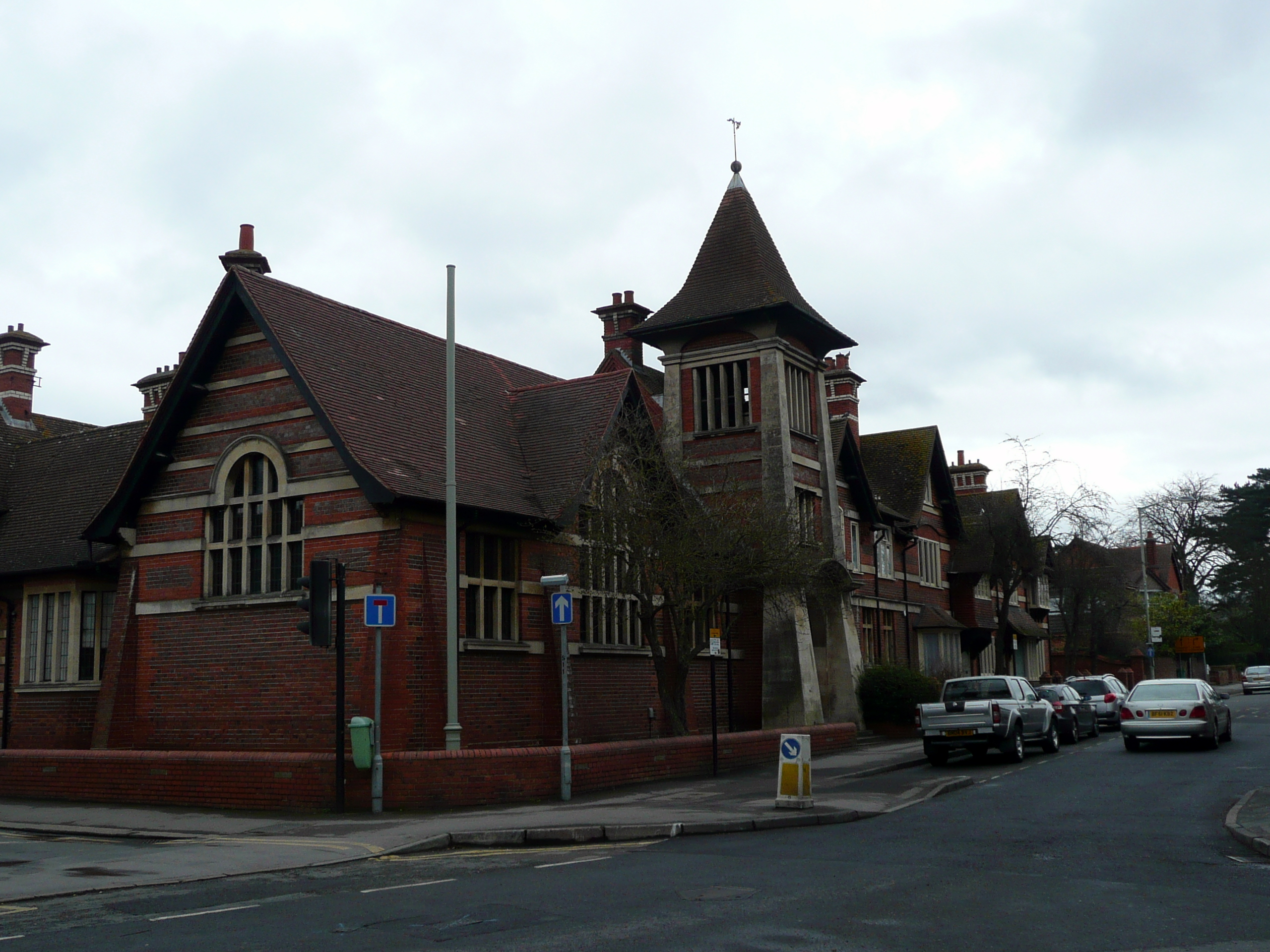
The attic storeroom of the then Wokingham Police Station was the original Tildesley incident office

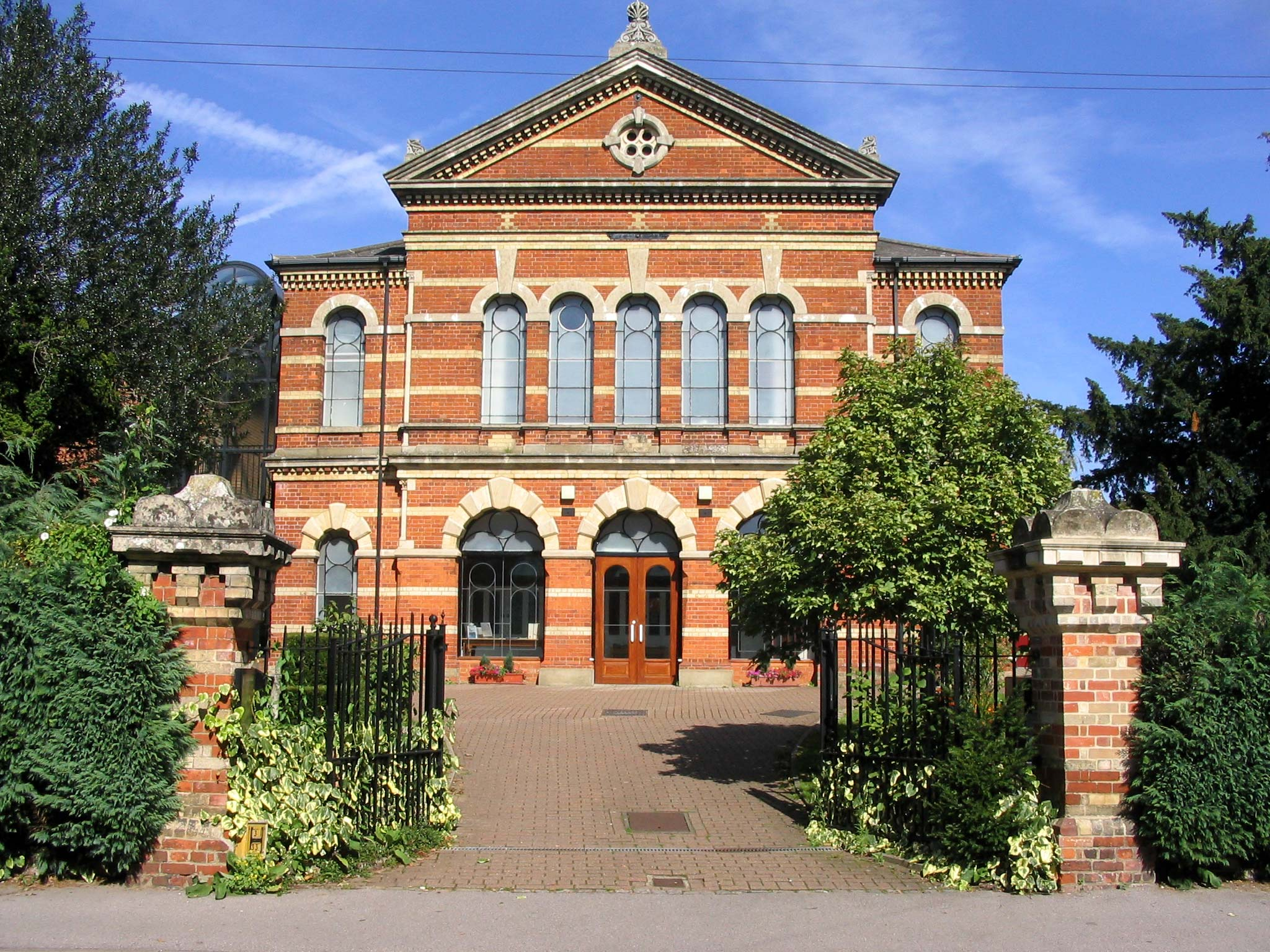
Wokingham Baptist Church was used as a police meeting room during the Tildesley investigation

The initial investigation was led by Detective Constable Geoff Gilbert. Coincidentally, Gilbert knew Tildesley personally through his mother's job at Wokingham police station.

From the start, Wokingham police were unprepared for such a major task. Only four officers were assigned to the case because TVP were short-staffed, as many officers were elsewhere confronting the 1984–1985 miners' strike. As Wokingham Police Station was too small, the attic storeroom was used as the incident office; the police also promptly set up a mobile office at the fairground. Two days after the disappearance, police had to use the Wokingham Baptist Church on Milton Road in Wokingham (immediately behind the police station) as a meeting room. After six weeks, the case became so big that TVP had to move the incident office to Sulhamstead near Reading.

The police had to check, given the age difference between Tildesley and his siblings, that he was in fact Lavinia Tildesley's son and not his sister Christina's. DC Gilbert was summoned to do this task, which Tildesley's mother described as "ridiculous". Tildesley's brother, Christopher, who had had an argument with him earlier on the day of his disappearance, was initially the prime suspect, but was soon ruled out.

On 7 June 1984, the day of the first Crimewatch UK appeal, two anonymous calls came in to say that they suspected a specific fairground worker was responsible for Tildesley's disappearance. The man had worked for the funfair for eleven years and was present at the fairground on the night Tildesley went missing. He was arrested and confessed to Tildesley's abduction, saying that he had raped and murdered him at his caravan nearby. However, he changed his story so many times that it became unreliable, and detectives concluded that he was the wrong man.

On 16 August 1984, the Metropolitan Police interviewed another fairground worker, Sidney Cooke, at his home in London. One of Cooke's colleagues had alerted detectives at the Tildesley incident office about his suspicious behaviour towards young boys in the past. The police asked Cooke whether he was in Wokingham on the night of the disappearance. He claimed that he was working at a fair opposite West Hendon police station in London that night, and the fair owner confirmed that Cooke was her employee. Cooke therefore remained on file but was eliminated as a suspect.

By October 1984, with no new information on the case, TVP started to wind down their investigation into Tildesley's disappearance. In April 1987, the press released a story about a possible link regarding attempted abductions of young children over the past six months in the Wokingham area. The police investigated whether these abductions could be linked to Tildesley's disappearance, but this was eventually dismissed.

=== Operation Orchid ===
In 1989, the Metropolitan Police established Operation Orchid, an enquiry into the disappearance of missing children led by Detective Chief Superintendent Roger Stoodley. As part of this operation, in December 1990, they interviewed convicted paedophile Leslie Bailey, who had already been charged with two other murders, that of 14-year-old Jason Swift and six-year-old Barry Lewis, both of which occurred after Tildesley's disappearance. Investigators had obtained a letter and a hand-drawn map which had been given by Bailey to a fellow inmate at HM Prison Wandsworth. The map showed where Tildesley had been killed; the letter, which had been written by a cellmate, was addressed to Cooke, who belonged to the same paedophile gang as Bailey and who also knew about Tildesley's murder.

At this point Bailey, who suffered from a mild learning disability, confessed that Cooke's paedophile gang, whom the police had nicknamed the "Dirty Dozen", had abducted, drugged, tortured, raped and murdered Tildesley on the night he disappeared. It was at this point that the police realised that the "stooping man" was in fact Cooke.

=== "Mark's party" ===
On the night of Tildesley's disappearance, Bailey had been asked by another member of the gang, his lover Lennie Smith, to drive him from Hackney to Wokingham, as there would be a party in a caravan owned by Cooke located near the fairground.

Upon arrival, Bailey parked in Langborough Road and Smith went into the funfair to find Cooke. They returned to Bailey's car with a young boy who was 'dragging back', despite being enticed away from the fairground on the promise of a 50p bag of sweets. The young boy, Tildesley, had to be physically picked up and forced into the back of the car. With Bailey driving, Smith was in the front passenger seat, while Cooke was holding Tildesley back in the rear of the car. They then met a fourth man, a relative of Bailey's known as "Odd Bod" at Cooke's caravan, located on a field called The Moors on Evendons Lane, between Finchampstead and Barkham.

The child was raped and murdered. After the murder, Bailey drove Smith back to Hackney, arriving there after midnight. Before Bailey dropped Smith off at the marshes, Smith said that he would leave the disposal of the body to Cooke.

=== Unfinished investigation ===
The police received a Judge's Commendation for pursuing an honourable and sustained investigation which led to the eventual solving of the Tildesley case. However, the police admitted in public that the case had not been finished as Tildesley's body had not been found. In 2007, Thames Valley Police set up the Dedicated Review Team to re-investigate unsolved murders and serious sexual assaults over the previous fifty years, which included Tildesley's murder, but nothing has come of it.

Tildesley is the "Dirty Dozen" ring's first known murder victim. However, in 2015, following media and political pressure, the police re-opened the investigation into the 1981 murder of seven-year-old Vishal Mehrotra near East Putney tube station in London. The gang are being investigated in relation to this killing, which took place more than three years prior to the murder of Tildesley.

In 2015, Stoodley expressed concern about a "cover up" by the Crown Prosecution Service over the Tildesley case, maintaining that there was sufficient evidence to prosecute Cooke over the killing.

== Legal proceedings ==
=== Sidney Charles Cooke ===
Cooke has never admitted playing any role in Tildesley's murder, despite a key ring identical to the one owned by the boy being found in his repossessed Jaguar XJ in 1985, a year after the disappearance. No charges were brought against him as the Crown Prosecution Service (CPS) felt that Bailey's confession was insufficient evidence for Cooke's case to result in a successful conviction, as well as the fact that Cooke was already serving time in prison for the manslaughter of Jason Swift.

=== Leslie Patrick Bailey ===
When he was sent to trial for Tildesley's killing, Bailey was already serving a prison sentence in HM Prison Whitemoor for the manslaughter of Jason Swift. On 7 October 1993, Bailey was murdered by two fellow inmates via strangulation with a ligature. His death was welcomed by Tildesley's parents.

=== Leonard William Gilchrist "Lennie" Smith ===
Smith has never admitted playing any role in Tildesley's murder. No charges were therefore brought against him as the CPS felt that Bailey's confession was insufficient evidence for Smith's case to result in a successful conviction.

Smith died of AIDS in a secret unit in HM Prison Nottingham in 2006. Once again, Mrs Tildesley responded by celebrating the news.

=== "Odd Bod" ===
A fourth man, mentioned by Bailey as part of the Operation Orchid investigation as being partly responsible for Tildesley's murder, was a relative of his. He was referred to as 'Odd Bod' throughout the investigation. However, as "Odd Bod" had the mental age of an eight-year-old, he could not have his name disclosed or be charged, put on trial or sentenced in connection with the killing. No charges were therefore brought against him as the CPS considered him to be too young for his case to result in a successful conviction.

=== Trial ===
On 18 October 1991, Bailey, 'with persons unknown', was charged with the murder of Tildesley. The subsequent trial was very unusual in that, despite Cooke and Smith not having been formally charged in the murder, the judge publicly named them as the perpetrators. Equally unusual was Bailey's instructions to his defence barrister to seek the maximum sentence possible, saying that he was 'surprised and disappointed' that Cooke and Smith were not in the dock with him.

On 22 October 1992, Bailey pleaded guilty at Reading Crown Court to the lesser charge of manslaughter and one charge of buggery, and received two life sentences on 9 December. On hearing the verdict, Tildesley's mother responded by calling for the re-introduction of the death penalty, saying, "He should have been hanged."

== Body ==
Bailey claimed he did not know where Cooke had buried the body. Cooke has indicated he knows the location of the body but refuses to tell the police, or the boy's family, where. Following the confession by Bailey to the murder, the police dug up The Moors in March 1991, but they did not find anything.

In May 1998, the police refused to re-question Cooke in relation to Tildesley's murder, and also refused to dig up a nearby golf course to search for his remains. In 2012, a fragment of human skull, discovered near Evendons Lane, was found not to be Tildesley's.

Tildesley's body has never been found and the murder is among Wokingham's most notorious crimes. Thames Valley Police initially thought his body was buried within a mile of the fairground from which he was abducted, but they now believe that his body is buried in a shallow grave on abandoned farmland. In 2019, the victim's family made a last-ditch plea begging Cooke, who is in his nineties, to reveal the whereabouts of Tildesley's body.

== Aftermath and memorials ==
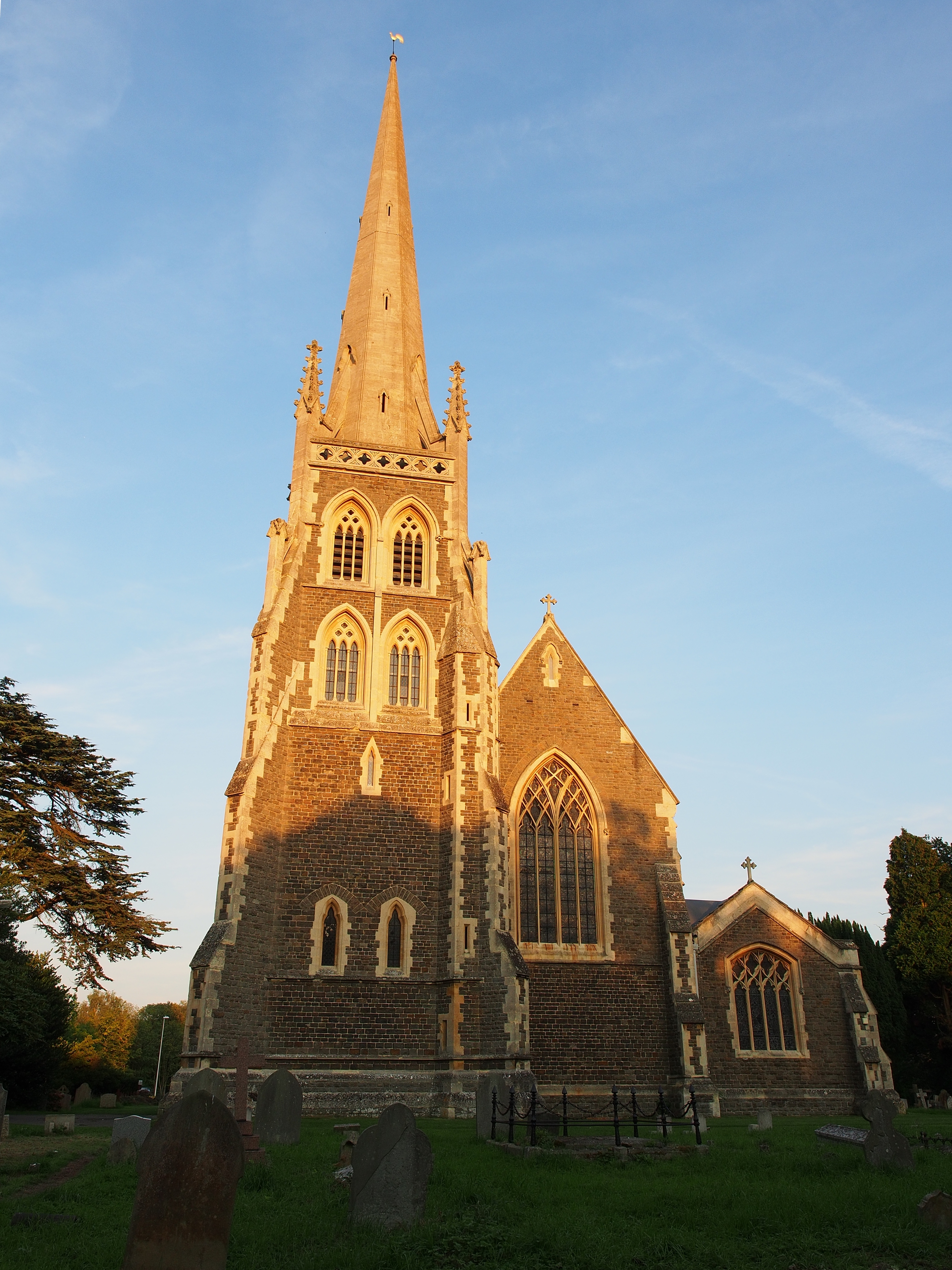
Free Church Burial Ground, located adjacent to St Paul's Church on Reading Road, Wokingham

=== Tildesley's bedroom ===
Tildesley's parents kept his bedroom exactly how it was the day he went missing until his mother moved to nearby Langley Common Road in Barkham (further away than Evendons Lane), shortly after his father's death in 2005.

=== Memorial bench ===
Shortly after Tildesley's disappearance, a public memorial, that of a jade-coloured bench, was erected exactly at the very spot where he was seen leaving the fairground by the general public. This can be seen directly to the right of the entrance to the Carnival Leisure Park on Wellington Road in Wokingham. A name plate on a plank of wood at the top of the bench reads "In Memory of MARK TILDESLEY". When Tildesley's mother died in 2011, a second name plate bearing her name was put on the bench, directly beneath the original plate, in remembrance of her.

=== Memorial service ===
A memorial service was held on 30 January 1993 at the Rose Street Methodist Church (now the Wokingham Methodist Church) in Rose Street in Wokingham, located opposite to the Tildesley residence.

=== Headstone ===
A headstone to Tildesley was erected, on 30 January 1993, at the Free Church Burial Ground on Reading Road in Wokingham. It reads "In loving memory of Mark Anthony Tildesley born 31 August 1976".

== Television ==
Tildesley's murder was documented in:

- The BBC Crimewatch episodes on both 7 June 1984 and 13 June 1985.
- The BBC's Crimewatch File: The Lost Boys on 11 October 1994.
- The Channel 4 Dispatches episode "Cooke" in October 1998.
- The BBC Panorama episode "Defend the Children" on 11 May 1998.

== Books ==
Tildesley's murder was featured in the 1993 book Lambs to the Slaughter by Ted Oliver and Ramsay Smith, who were editors of the Daily Mirror at the time of Tildesley's disappearance.

== See also ==
- List of major crimes in the United Kingdom
- List of solved missing person cases (1980s)
- List of unsolved murders in the United Kingdom
