= John Hemming (politician) =

British politician (born 1960)

John Hemming FRSA
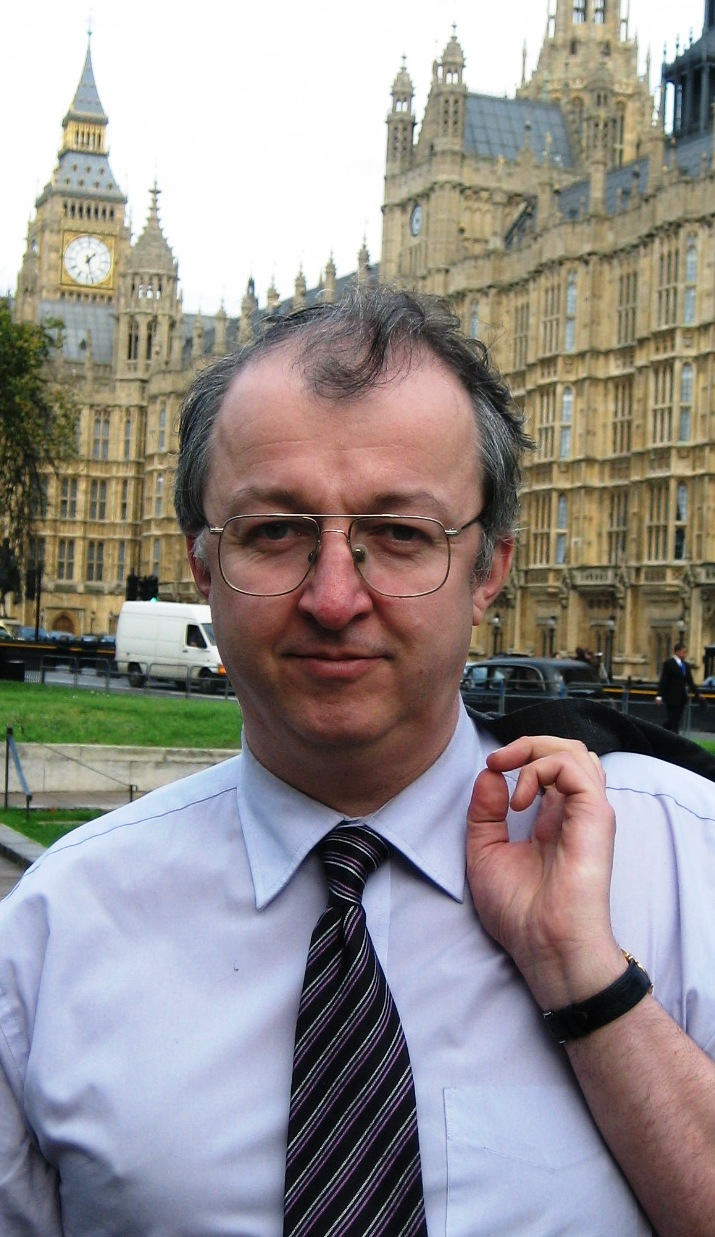
- Hemming in 2005

Member of Parliament for Birmingham Yardley
- In office 5 May 2005 – 30 March 2015
- Preceded by: Estelle Morris
- Succeeded by: Jess Phillips

Personal details
- Born: John Alexander Melvin Hemming; 16 March 1960 (age 66) Birmingham, England
- Party: Liberal Democrat (from 1988)
- Other political affiliations: Liberal (until 1988)
- Spouse: Christine (div.)
- Domestic partner: Emily Cox
- Children: 5
- Education: Magdalen College, Oxford
- Website: http://john.hemming.name

John Alexander Melvin Hemming (born 16 March 1960) is a British Liberal Democrat politician and businessman who served as the Member of Parliament for Birmingham Yardley from 2005 until 2015.

Hemming was an elected councillor for the South Yardley Ward and Group Chair of the Liberal Democrats on Birmingham City Council until 1 May 2008 and was elected as the Member of Parliament for Birmingham Yardley at the 2005 general election. He was the first Liberal Democrat or Liberal to represent a Birmingham constituency since Wallace Lawler had briefly held Birmingham Ladywood after a 1969 by-election.

In 2004, Hemming became deputy leader of Birmingham City Council in a deal whereby the Conservatives and Liberal Democrats formed a coalition to jointly administer the council. He stood down from this position upon being elected to the House of Commons in 2005.

In 2007, Hemming became the Liberal Democrat Spokesman for the West Midlands and led the West Midlands Liberal Democrat team of spokespeople, with Solihull MP Lorely Burt as the Deputy Leader.

== Early life and career ==
Hemming was born in Birmingham. His father was an electrical contractor and his mother was a supply teacher. He was educated at King Edward's School, Birmingham, where he won the Rickard Prize for Arithmetic and was a Scholar specialising in Theoretical, Atomic, and Nuclear Physics at Magdalen College, Oxford, where he showed an early interest in politics, standing as the Liberal Party candidate for Secretary of the Oxford University Student Union. He was beaten into fourth place by the "Silly Party" candidate – the pet dog of the master of St Catherine's College, Oxford.

Hemming is a director of JHC plc, a provider of software applications and related services for the financial industry. Its products include trading, asset management and settlement systems for brokers and investment managers. JHC made Hemming a millionaire by the age of 27, and the company had an annual turnover of £12 million by 2011. In 2009, Hemming was awarded the Systems in the City Lifetime Achievement Award for his work with the company. In 1997, Hemming also set up his own record company, Music Mercia International.

Hemming was first elected to Birmingham City Council in 1990, in Acocks Green ward. He moved to the South Yardley ward following boundary changes in 2004 and was Leader of Birmingham City Council's Liberal Democrat Group. As a councillor, he campaigned against election fraud, and in 2004 he drafted a petition which overturned the election of three Labour Party councillors in the ward of Aston.

== Parliamentary career ==
Hemming was a candidate in Birmingham seats at all general elections since 1983: in that year at (Hall Green), 1987 (Small Heath) and 1992, 1997 and 2001 (Yardley) before winning in 2005. He was re-elected in 2010, with a slightly increased majority.

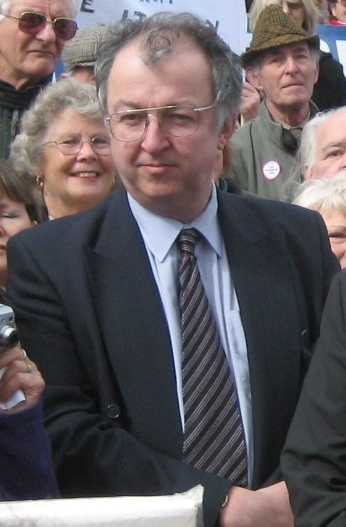
John Hemming at a rally in support of Hartismere hospital

Following Charles Kennedy's announcement that he would resign as Leader of the Liberal Democrats, Hemming announced on his weblog that he was taking soundings as to whether to stand. When Kennedy subsequently resigned, Hemming said that he would stand to ensure there was a contest. Hemming was a rank outsider in the contest (some betting odds were in excess of 400–1). The Times reported that he was "an eccentric who left colleagues aghast by threatening to stand". On 13 January 2006, Hemming withdrew his candidature, saying that Lib Dem members did not believe he should stand. He was a nominator for Mark Oaten, but said he would be willing to do the same for any serious candidate. He subsequently declared for the eventual winner, Sir Menzies Campbell.

On 6 December 2010, Hemming's constituency office was temporarily closed by the police after it was occupied by protesters.

Hemming chaired both the All Party Parliamentary Group on Peak Oil and Gas (APPGOPO), a parliamentary group looking at the issues of fossil fuel depletion, and the All Party Parliamentary Group on Family Law and The Court of Protection set up to address the concerns raised by both the public and professionals working within the family justice system.

Hemming is a member of the Beveridge Group. He won the "Reform" maths prize.

=== Action on injunctions and free speech ===
Hemming is an opponent of super- and hyper-injunctions, and in March 2011, used parliamentary privilege to reveal the existence of a super-injunction granted to former Royal Bank of Scotland chief Fred Goodwin during a sitting of the House of Commons. Following an incident in Spring 2011, in which the names of celebrities who had allegedly taken out superinjunctions were revealed on Twitter, he again used parliamentary privilege to speak about the issue. On 23 May 2011, during a Commons debate; he mentioned Ryan Giggs as the footballer involved in one privacy injunction.

In the final meeting of the House of Commons in the summer of 2011 before the session closed for summer recess, he mentioned details of an injunction and alleged cover-up involving a doctor employed by a Welsh NHS trust. The said doctor is accused by a fellow doctor and surgical assistants of performing surgeries on cancer patients beyond his expertise, against guidelines and in so doing, endangering the lives of patients.

Hemming also aided the case of financial journalist Leah McGrath Goodman, who was banned from the UK for two years during her reporting work on the Jersey child abuse investigation 2008 and Haut de la Garenne. The ban was reduced to one year after his actions on her behalf. He also made a motion in 2012 regarding St Helier Parish Deputy Trevor Pitman's petition to have her UK visa restored.

=== Mumsnet controversy ===
A regular contributor to Mumsnet (a British parenting forum) for eleven years, Hemming posted in late-2013 about the case of an Italian woman sectioned in the UK while her newborn baby was taken into care by the local children's services department.

During this debate, he posted extracts from un-redacted documents which named the children of the woman involved, potentially breaking a court order. Confirming that it was Hemming who had broken the site's terms and conditions by revealing posters' identities, Mumsnet removed the documents that he had posted and he was subsequently suspended as a website user.

== Later activities ==
At the 2015 general election, Hemming lost Birmingham Yardley to Jess Phillips of the Labour Party by 6,595 votes. Hemming stood again as the Liberal Democrat candidate in his old seat at the 2017 general election, but was defeated by Jess Phillips who increased her majority.

== False accusations of sexual assault and libel victory ==
In 2015, Esther Baker falsely accused Hemming of being part of a VIP paedophile ring that abused children in Staffordshire in the 1980s and 1990s. Staffordshire police refused to prosecute Baker for perverting the course of justice, claiming there was insufficient evidence for a realistic prospect of conviction.

In January 2019, Hemming successfully brought libel cases against Graham Wilmer, of the Lantern Project charity and David Hencke, a journalist who worked for Exaro. The pair paid over £10,000 between them after having admitted defaming Hemming on social media in relation to the false abuse allegations. The Crown Prosecution Service later charged Baker with four counts of perverting the course of justice, concluding there was sufficient evidence that her allegations were maliciously fabricated. She indicated not guilty pleas, and her trial is scheduled to begin on 22 March 2027.

Hemming criticised his political opponents from the Labour Party such as MP Jess Phillips for promoting the false allegations against him. He said: "Some members of the Labour Party, including my opponent in the last two General Elections, have invested considerable time in promoting these allegations. The promotion of the complainant as an expert in this subject area as a consequence of these allegations has caused additional difficulties for my family." Hemming went on to state: "I am not myself aware of another situation where members and supporters of a political party have promoted such allegations in such a public manner – essentially arming the villagers with torches and pitchforks and setting off on a lynching. There were public attempts to prevent me from standing as a candidate because of allegations made maliciously by a Labour Party member backed by other members of the Labour Party."

== Personal life ==
Shortly after his election in 2005, it was revealed that he was the father of a child with his personal assistant and (then) fellow councillor Emily Cox, although he continued to live with his wife and the couple's three children. His wife, Christine, commented that she forgave him and was standing by him, as he had always been honest about his extramarital affairs, of which she said this was "about number 26". Following the publication of details of his affairs, Hemming voted for himself for the News of the World's 'Love Rat of the Year' competition.

Parliament of the United Kingdom
Preceded by Estelle Morris	Member of Parliament for Birmingham Yardley; 2005–2015	Succeeded by Jess Phillips
