= David Hencke =

British investigative journalist and writer (1947–2026)

David Robert Hencke
- Born: 26 April 1947; Wandsworth, London, United Kingdom
- Died: 26 June 2026 (aged 79)
- Occupations: investigative journalist, writer, political correspondent
- Known for: Uncovering political scandals, including the cash-for-questions affair

David Robert Hencke (/ˈhɛŋkiː/ HENK-ee; 26 April 1947 – 26 June 2026) was a British investigative journalist, writer, and political correspondent. He won numerous journalistic awards for his work, and was best known for exposing several political scandals such as the cash-for-questions affair.

== Personal life ==
David Hencke was born in Wandsworth, London on 26 April 1947. He died from liver cancer on 26 June 2026, aged 79.

== Career ==
Hencke began as a student journalist in 1965 at Warwick University as editor of its first university newspaper, Giblet, while studying history and politics. In 1968 he worked for the Northamptonshire Evening Telegraph, then in 1971 joined the Western Mail in Cardiff and in 1973 the Times Higher Education Supplement.

He joined The Guardian in 1976, becoming the newspaper's Westminster Correspondent in 1986. He won numerous awards for his political coverage.

He came to national prominence in the 90s for uncovering a series of Westminster political financial scandals in what was dubbed "Tory sleaze", which contributed to the Conservatives' historic landslide defeat to Tony Blair-led Labour in the 1997 election.

One of his investigations uncovered the "Cash-for-questions affair" which led to the bankruptcy of Ian Greer Associates, one of the country's biggest lobbying companies, and the resignations of two junior ministers, Neil Hamilton and Tim Smith. Hencke was named in 1994 What the Papers Say Journalist of the Year for this exposé.

Hencke won "Scoop of the Year" in 1998 for another story, concerning newly elected New Labour, that caused the first resignation of Peter Mandelson, over a secret undeclared £373,000 home loan given to him by fellow Treasury minister, Geoffrey Robinson.

After authoring several more books in the 2000s, he took voluntary redundancy from The Guardian after 33 years in 2009. He worked as the Westminster correspondent for Tribune and an investigative journalist for the (now closed) Exaro website.

In 2012, Hencke was named "Political Journalist of the Year" at the British Press Awards. Two uears later, in 2014, he was longlisted for the Orwell Prize for political journalism.

Hencke managed his blog Westminster Confidential on which he published "news, views, investigations and much more", and regularly contributed to Byline Times.

== Libel ==
Former Liberal Democrat MP John Hemming, who had been falsely accused of abuse in an article in the Exaro website by Hencke, succeeded in a libel action against him in January 2019, resulting in Hencke and Graham Wilmer of the Lantern Project paying over £10,000 in compensation for the false allegations. In February 2026, Hemming's accuser, Esther Baker, received a trial date of March 2027 after being charged with making false sexual abuse claims against Hemming and others.

== Books ==
- David Hencke (1976) Colleges in Crisis
- David Hencke and Francis Beckett (2004) The Blairs and their court
- David Hencke (2004) Marching to the Fault Line, which examined the 1984 miners' strike
- David Hencke and Francis Beckett (2005) The Survivor: Tony Blair in peace and war
