= Dolphin Square =

Block of private apartments and business complex in Pimlico, London

Coordinates: 51.4863°N 0.1364°W

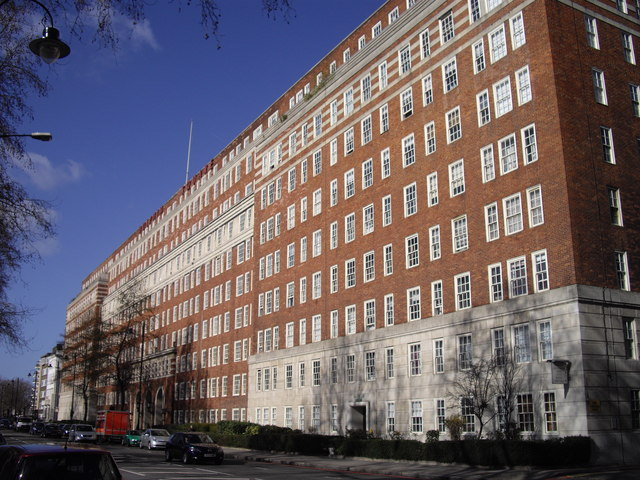
- Interactive map of the Dolphin Square area

General information
- Type: Mixed-use
- Architectural style: Neo-Georgian
- Location: Dolphin Square, Chichester Street, London SW1V 3NQ, United Kingdom
- Construction started: 1935
- Completed: 1937
- Renovated: 2022–2029
- Owner: The Dolphin Square Estate SARL

Technical details
- Floor count: 9

Design and construction
- Architect: Stanley Gordon Jeeves
- Developer: Richard Costain Ltd.

Other information
- Number of units: 1234

Website
- https://www.dolphinsquare.co.uk/

Dolphin Square is a prominent estate of private flats near the River Thames in Pimlico, Westminster, UK. Built between 1935 and 1937, it was, until the development of Highbury Square, the largest garden square in Greater London constructed as private housing.

Its 1,234 flats were described by Nikolaus Pevsner as the "largest self-contained block of flats in Europe". The design influenced later municipal housing developments. At the time of its completion, Dolphin Square was described as "London's most distinguished address".

The estate comprises 13 blocks named after famous navigators and admirals and features a range of amenities including a swimming pool, tennis courts, café and wine bar, gym, shopping arcade, and landscaped gardens. The Grade II listed 3.5-acre gardens were designed by Richard Sudell and reflect global horticultural styles.

Situated near the Houses of Parliament, Dolphin Square has housed a range of prominent residents, including former Prime Minister Harold Wilson, as well as notable figures from the arts, culture, and even the royal family.

== Location ==
Dolphin Square is located in Pimlico, London, within the City of Westminster. It is bounded by Grosvenor Road, Chichester Street, Claverton Street, and St George's Square, near the River Thames. The estate is close to Pimlico Underground station and within walking distance of Tate Britain and the Houses of Parliament.

== History ==
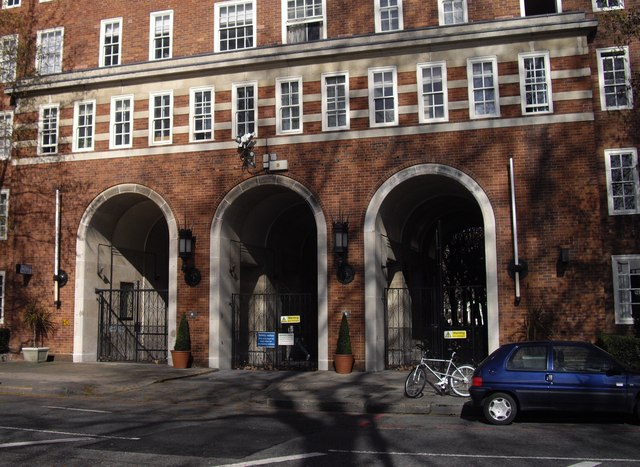
Grosvenor Road entrance to Dolphin Square

Dolphin Square is on the site of the former works of the developer and builder Thomas Cubitt who created the surrounding Pimlico district in the 19th century. The Royal Army Clothing Depot was built on the site after Cubitt's death and stood until 1933 when the leasehold on the site reverted to the Duke of Westminster. An American firm, the Fred F. French Companies, bought the freehold for the site from the Duke with plans to build a large residential development, provisionally named Ormonde Court. Although the planning stage was successfully concluded with the LCC by January 1935, French still needed financial backing for the enterprise. At the same time, he had over-extended his credit during his recent developments in New York City such as Tudor City and Knickerbocker Village and found himself unable to repay interest on earlier deals. Needing a new backer, French sold his obligations to Richard Costain Ltd., run by Richard Rylands Costain. New plans were drawn up by the architect S. Gordon Jeeves, and building started in September 1935. Lord Amulree formally opened the building on 25 November 1936.

A. P. Herbert, writing in Dolphin Square (a promotional booklet produced for Costains in 1935, with illustrations by H. M. Bateman) described the Square as "a city of 1,250 flats, each enjoying at the same time most of the advantages of the separate house and the big communal dwelling place". The provision of a restaurant made him fear that "fortunate wives will not have enough to do. A little drudgery is good for wives, perhaps. The Dolphin lady may be spoiled." On purchasing the site, Costain remarked to a colleague: "in two or three years we'll either drive up to this spot in a Rolls-Royce, or we'll be standing here selling matches."

In 1958, Costains sold Dolphin Square for £2.4 million to Sir Maxwell Joseph, who sold it to Lintang Investments in 1959 for £3.1 million. Westminster City Council bought the lease of the block for £4.5 million in the mid-1960s, and subsequently sub-let it to the Dolphin Square Trust, a housing association, which had been newly created for the purpose. In January 2006, the Trust and the Council sold Dolphin Square to the American Westbrook Holdings group for £200 million, and in 2020, Axa Investment Managers acquired the estate on behalf of its clients.

Accommodation is provided in 13 blocks (or "houses"), each named after a famous navigator or admiral. At the south (Thames) side of the Square the houses are Grenville, Drake, Raleigh and Hawkins. Moving from the river up the west side, there are Nelson, Howard, Beatty, and Duncan. A hotel and administration offices, on the north side of the Square, are in Dolphin House, previously known as Rodney. Heading south from the hotel there are Keyes, Hood, Collingwood and Frobisher.

=== Wartime intelligence and government use ===
Dolphin Square played significant roles during and after World War II. Grenville House served as the headquarters for General De Gaulle's Free French Government-in-exile. Meanwhile, number 308 Hood House hosted MI5's B5(b) section, which infiltrated potentially subversive groups from 1924 to 1946.

=== Cold War espionage ===
The site also became notorious during the Cold War for espionage activity. In 1962, John Vassall, a civil servant turned Soviet spy, was arrested in apartment 807 of Hood House.

=== Controversy and false allegations ===
Dolphin Square was later at the centre of high-profile false allegations. In November 2014, the Metropolitan Police launched Operation Fairbank to investigate claims that prominent MPs had used Dolphin Square as a site for child abuse. Carl Beech, publicly known as "Nick", falsely alleged he was abused there as a child, leading to a parallel murder investigation named Operation Midland. Despite extensive media coverage and interviews with Beech by outlets such as Exaro and BBC News, the police closed the case in March 2016 with no charges filed. Beech was eventually convicted in 2019 for fabricating the allegations. The incident prompted public and institutional criticism regarding the credibility given to the accusations and the conduct of the investigation.

== Architecture ==
Costains appointed architect Gordon Jeeves to design Dolphin Square, assisted by Cecil Eve. Oscar Faber served as consultant engineer. It was Jeeves's largest project at the time; he had also contributed to buildings like the National Radiator Building and Berkeley Square House. The neo-Georgian structure was built using reinforced concrete with brick and stone facings. Floors were soundproofed with compressed cork insulation. Construction costs totalled around £2 million for the 1,234 flats.

The project required the movement of 200,000 tonnes of earth, the use of 125,000 tons of concrete, 12 million bricks, and the installation of 6,700 Crittall windows. Flat sizes varied from one-bedroom suites to five-bedroom residences with maids' rooms and three bathrooms. Original on-site services included shops, a children's centre, a library, a nursery, and a garage for up to 300 cars. A proposed riverside wharf with a marina, café, and terraced gardens leading to the Thames was never realised.

== Restoration ==
In 2021, a multi-year restoration programme began at Dolphin Square. The project is planned to span eight years and will include all 1,234 apartments across the estate. The initial phase focused on Rodney, Duncan, and Beatty Houses.

The restoration involves the replacement of over 6,000 windows, upgrading of utilities, and internal refurbishments aimed at improving energy performance including the removal of the estate's gas-fired communal heating system and installation of more than 150 air-source heat pumps. The works are being carried out with the intention of preserving the estate's original architectural style.

The programme also includes updates to communal amenities such as the fitness centre, pool, spa, and shared spaces. The works are intended to balance conservation of the historic estate with the integration of modern infrastructure and energy-efficient systems.

== Facilities ==
Historically, Dolphin Square offered an extensive range of amenities, including eight squash courts, a swimming pool, gymnasium, bars, a winter garden, palm court, restaurant, luggage rooms, a beauty parlour, laundry depot, theatre booking office, nursery, library, and music room. The estate also featured an underground garage with a petrol station, car showrooms, and parking for 300 vehicles, as well as themed gardens, guest rooms for visitors, and a variety of resident services such as valeting, laundry, and room hire for events and art studies.

Today, Dolphin Square continues to provide a variety of facilities including a fitness centre, spa, and car park. It also houses the Dolphin Square Terrace Bar & Café, maintaining its tradition of offering lifestyle and leisure amenities within the estate.

== Residents ==
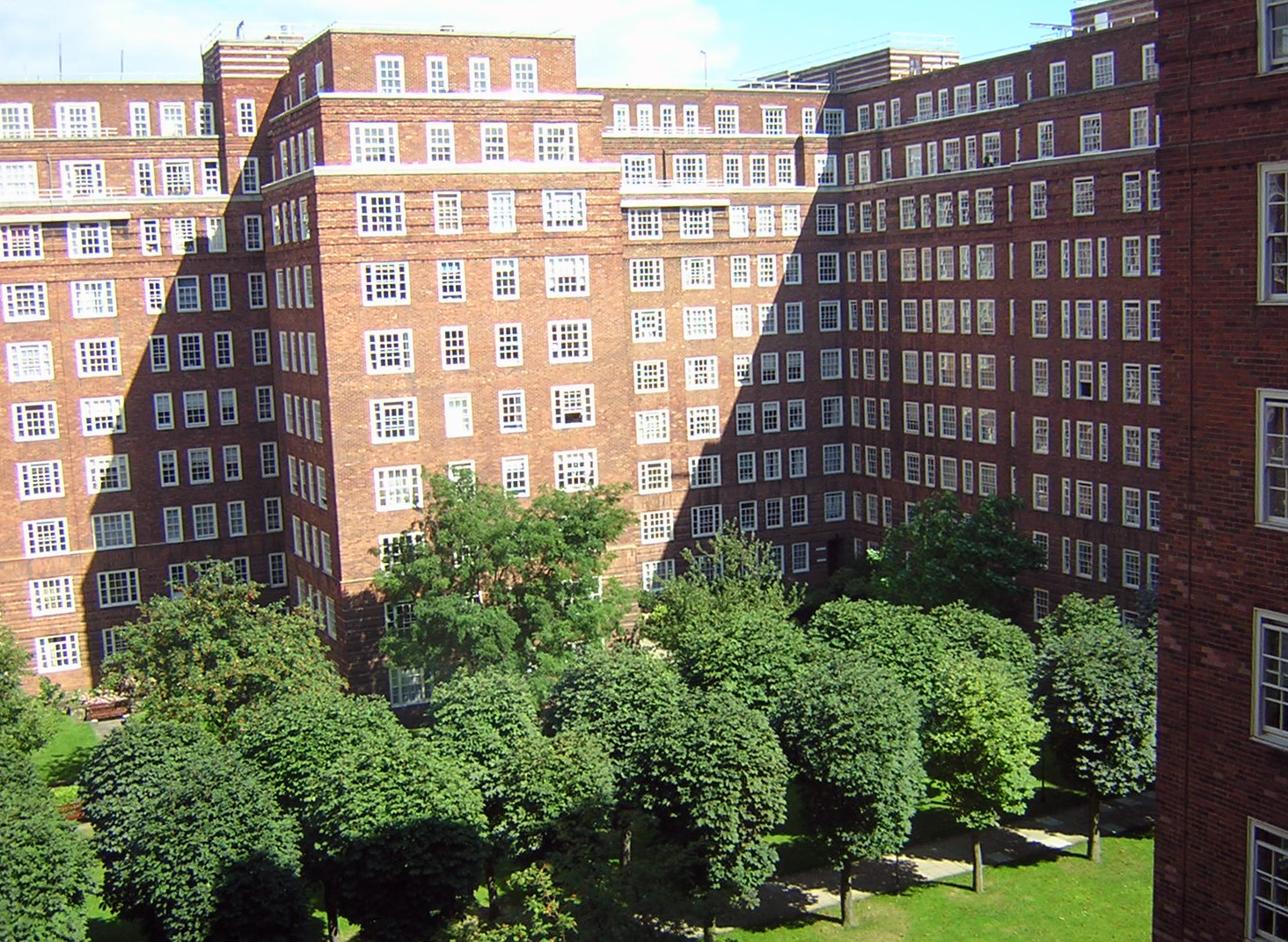
Dolphin Square

Given its location near the Palace of Westminster and the headquarters of MI5 and MI6, Dolphin Square has historically housed many politicians, civil servants and intelligence personnel. Notable political residents include Harold Wilson, David Steel, William Hague, Estelle Morris, Beverley Hughes, Michael Mates, John Langford-Holt, Iain Mills, and Andy Burnham.

At its peak, it housed more than 70 MPs and at least 10 Lords.

Other well-known residents have included comedians Ben Lyon and Bud Flanagan; actors Peter Finch and Thorley Walters; writer Radclyffe Hall; former Lord Chief Justice Lord Goddard; Profumo affair figures Christine Keeler and Mandy Rice-Davies; and Anne, Princess Royal who lived in a two-bedroom apartment on the estate with her second husband, Timothy Laurence.

Australian tennis player Rod Laver also stayed at Dolphin Square during his 1969 Grand Slam season.

== In popular culture ==
Scenes in the 1967 sci-fi horror The Sorcerers were filmed in and around Dolphin Square.

In Len Deighton's alternate history novel SS-GB, which is set in a German-occupied Great Britain during World War II, Dolphin Square is requisitioned for use as an interrogation centre.

The video for Culture Club's 1982 UK number one single "Do You Really Want to Hurt Me", was set, but not filmed, at the Dolphin Pool. The pool in the video is of a different architectural style, visibly not the Dolphin Pool.

In British novelist Kate Atkinson's 2018 spy novel Transcription, MI5 runs a small counterespionage operation from Nelson House in Dolphin Square.
