= Benjamin Pell =

British man (born 1963)

Benjamin Pell (also known as Benji the Binman; born December 1963) is a British man who is known for having raked through the dustbins of law firms representing prominent people in search of incriminating or compromising documents that he could sell to the press.

== Activities ==
An adherent of Orthodox Judaism who was once a trainee lawyer, he (initially) failed his law exams at University College London in 1986 which he was expected to pass. He later gained a third-class degree, but could not get a job with a law firm. Pell pretended to be following a legal career for eight months until his family discovered the truth.

Pell began his activities in uncovering discarded newsworthy documents, classified as theft, around 1997. The documents he found have been involved in several court cases and led to many newspaper stories, including ones involving Elton John, All Saints and the 'cash for questions' libel case between Mohamed Al-Fayed and Neil Hamilton. He said in 2002, "I was never interested in the political stuff. I was a showbiz animal, and my showbiz stuff was top quality. [...] You'd get more money for a little nib about Hear'Say than you'd get for anything about Gordon Brown and David Blunkett." In the case of Elton John, Pell had hacked into the computers of organisations connected with the singer and looked through the rubbish of John Reid Enterprises, the company of his former manager. Piers Morgan at the Leveson Inquiry in 2011 admitted buying documents for stories from Pell while editor of the Daily Mirror, including Elton John's discarded bank statements, and said that such behaviour was on the "cusp of [the] unethical". Pell's activity was referred to as "binology".

For seven years, Pell monitored Justice Eady, sitting in on all his cases and forensically analysing his every judgement. Pell said: "Court 13 is not Eady's domain, it's my domain. I hope Eady is terrified of me. He should be."

== Documentary and court cases ==
Pell was the subject of a Channel 4 television documentary Scandal in the Bins (2000) produced by Victor Lewis-Smith. Another documentary—reportedly in production at around the same time—produced by Iain Jones, led Pell to claim in 2001 that John Mappin had fraudulently misrepresented his claim to be able to make a movie about Pell, and had "hoodwinked" him out of nearly £80,000. The following year Pell successfully sued Mappin, whose family founded the Mappin & Webb jewellery firm, and recovered his £77,750; Mappin had said he could commission a "well-connected Hollywood film-maker", but Jones had turned out to be a hairdresser. The court ordered Mappin to pay Pell's legal costs and interest on the money he had been given. According to an interview Pell gave at this time, he ended his regular bin-searching activity in February 2001.

== Damages ==
In 2003, he won damages of £125,000 in an out-of-court settlement from the Sunday Express, which had falsely accused him of providing the IRA with information, and slander against Mark Watts, the journalist who had verbally accused him of the same act. Watts wrote a book about Pell titled The Fleet Street Sewer Rat, published in 2005. He has been prosecuted himself and was only fined £20, due to his claim that he lived off a weekly £10 payment from his father despite the estimated £100,000 a year he was earning from selling documents to newspapers. He has asserted that it was about £25,000. He was mentioned regularly in Private Eye, which nicknamed him "Benji the Binman".

== Later life ==
Pell was regularly found during the 2000s in the Royal Courts of Justice taking notes on libel trials, in which he has a particular interest, and is well known to the King's Bench jurists. From June 2017, following the Grenfell Tower fire he took an active interest in the issue of unsafe cladding on high-rise tower blocks affecting 500,000 residents in the UK, using the tribunal system to complain about issues with the building in Slough where he lives.

== Death of brother ==
His older brother, Daniel (Dany), was killed in a road accident aged 21. In reference to this, he once said, "Everything I was asked to do, I would have to do double. It was a sort of way of compensating for the loss of my brother".

== References and sources ==
=== Sources ===
- Tim Adams. "Benjamin Pell Versus the Rest of the World" (subscription required), Granta, 87:21 (2004)
