= Disappearance of Martin Allen =

Unsolved 1979 case of 15-year-old who disappeared from London

Martin Allen
- Allen, c. autumn 1979
- Born: 19 October 1964; Islington, London, England
- Disappeared: 5 November 1979 (aged 15), c. 3:50 p.m. King's Cross station, London, England; 51.53138°N 0.12138°W (approximate)
- Status: Missing for 46 years, 11 months and 22 days
- Known for: Missing person
- Height: 5 ft 0 in (1.52 m)
- Distinguishing features: Caucasian male. Short, dark brown hair, brown eyes. Wears braces.

Martin Duncan Allen (19 October 1964 – disappeared 5 November 1979) was a 15-year-old British boy who disappeared while travelling home from Central Foundation Boys' School on the London Underground on 5 November 1979. He was last definitively seen alive at King's Cross St Pancras tube station at approximately 3:50 p.m. walking toward the Piccadilly line platform, although subsequent eyewitness statements indicate Allen may have travelled—willingly or otherwise—to Earl's Court tube station in the company of an adult male.

Allen is strongly suspected to have been abducted, possibly by a member or members of a paedophile ring, although no definitive suspect has ever been identified.

Despite an intense police investigation and extensive media coverage, no one has ever been charged with his abduction, and Allen's fate remains unknown. Although officially a cold case, Allen's disappearance has been subject to periodic review, and the case remains open.

== Early life ==
Martin Duncan Allen was born in Islington, London, on 19 October 1964, the youngest of four sons born to Thomas and Eileen (née Clark) Allen. His father was a chauffeur, and his mother a secretary at Tufnell Park Primary School. The family were working class and close-knit, and lived in a council flat in Hornsey in north London. The brothers frequently spent weekends ice skating at Alexandra Palace.

=== Adolescence ===
In 1976, Thomas Allen gained prestigious employment as the chauffeur to the Australian High Commissioner, Sir Gordon Freeth. The Allen family moved into a five-bedroom grace-and-favour cottage in the grounds of the Australian High Commission in Kensington, and their socioeconomic status improved. Their new neighbours included the De Beers jewellery family, and Allen and his brother Kevin (18 months his senior) earned £5 (the equivalent of approximately £27 as of 2026) cleaning the commissioner's fleet of imported Ford Fairlane cars every Saturday. Politicians such as Margaret Thatcher and Edward Heath were regular visitors to the High Commission and high profile people often socialised in the grounds. Kevin Allen recollected in 2015: "There were garden parties over the fence from us; Thatcher knew my Dad to say hello to."

Allen attended the Central Foundation Grammar School in Old Street, approximately 6 miles (9.7 km) from the family's Reston Place cottage. He often travelled to school on the London Underground, leaving the train at Old Street station. Although described as a shy boy, he was an intelligent pupil, with a particular flair for French, mathematics, and drawing. By his fifteenth birthday, Allen was 5 feet 0 inches (1.52 m) in height, slightly-built, and looked slightly younger than his years. His hobbies included photography, bicycling, drawing, and model railways.

== 5 November 1979 ==
On Monday 5 November 1979, Allen travelled to school on the London Underground with his 17-year-old brother Jeffrey. The brothers travelled on the Circle line from Gloucester Road tube station to King's Cross St Pancras tube station, where they transferred to the Northern line to Old Street station. The brothers arrived at school shortly before 9 a.m.

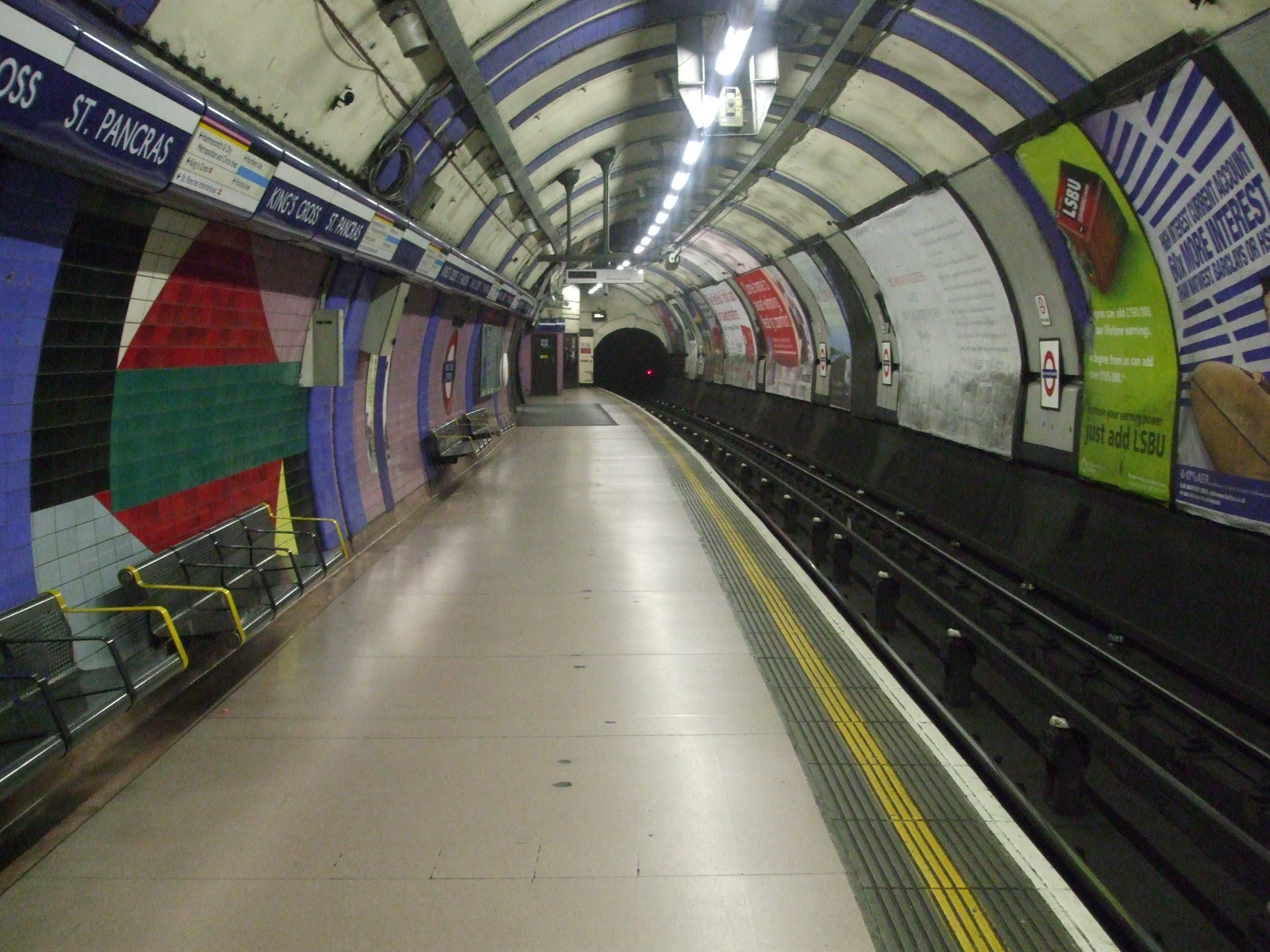
The southbound Piccadilly line at King's Cross St Pancras tube station. Allen was last seen close to this location at 3:50 p.m. on 5 November 1979.

Allen's day was unremarkable, and he finished school at 3 p.m. He and a friend, Ian Fletcher, travelled home from school together on the Underground. Fletcher later told investigators he and Allen parted company at King's Cross St Pancras tube station, and that he last saw his friend on an escalator to the southbound Piccadilly line platform at approximately 3:50 p.m. after Allen had simply said "See ya tomorrow", before Fletcher walked to another platform. Allen was wearing his school uniform and carrying a distinctive yellow schoolbag inscribed with the word "Astral". Fletcher was adamant Allen had been alone when descending the escalator.

In addition to a lunchbox, PE kit, schoolbooks and stationery, Allen's schoolbag contained a new transformer for his model railway, and an item of woollen clothing his mother had knitted for her first grandchild and which Allen planned to give to his oldest brother, Robert, and his sister-in-law, Susan, that afternoon. He had initially intended to travel to their Holloway Road home immediately after leaving school, but told friends he would first have to go home to collect a £1 note to give his sister-in-law as payment towards a digital watch he had recently bought from her mail-order catalogue. The trip home then to Holloway Road via the tube network would have taken Allen approximately twenty-five minutes.

=== Disappearance ===
Allen failed to arrive either at home or at his brother's Holloway Road home. His disappearance was not noted for over twenty-four hours as his parents assumed that he had stayed overnight with his brother and sister-in-law and would come home the following evening. He typically stayed there on Mondays as his mother attended fitness classes and his father often returned home from work late. His brother—who had no telephone—assumed Allen had returned home from school, possibly to attend Guy Fawkes Night celebrations at Battersea Park with their brother Kevin, so neither his parents nor any of his brothers realised he was missing until the following evening.

Map of Greater London, denoting Allen's movements on 5 November 1979. The black cross indicates the location at King's Cross station where Allen was last definitively seen alive; the flashpoint indicates the location of Earl's Court station, where a boy matching Allen's description was seen in the company of an unknown man at approximately 4:15 p.m.

When he did not return home from school on the afternoon of 6 November, his parents contacted his best friend, Robert Toft, and discovered Allen had not been at school that day. Eileen Allen then phoned her oldest son, Robert, at 7 p.m., and learned Allen had not arrived at his home the previous day and that he had assumed this was because of the Guy Fawkes Night celebrations. After calling several of his other friends, and finding they had not seen him since the previous day, Thomas and Eileen Allen called the Metropolitan Police to report him missing.

== Initial investigation ==
Police believed Allen was abducted, strongly suspecting a "violent or sexual motive", and an intense manhunt was launched to find him. After receiving several eyewitness reports of an adult male likely seen in his company on the London Underground, the police attempted to identify the man seen with Allen. Detective Chief Inspector David Veness was given command of the investigation, and numerous officers were assigned to the case. Extensive media publicity was devoted to the manhunt, with the Australian High Commissioner, Sir Gordon Freeth, also offering a financial reward for information leading to Allen's whereabouts. (Note: The Australian High Commissioner's offer of a financial reward for any information leading to Allen's whereabouts failed to generate any solid public leads.)

Investigators initially focused their search in North London, conducting searches in areas of interest such as vacant land and derelict properties in and around Holloway, King's Cross, and around Allen's home and school. These searches failed to yield any clues. Officers also conducted door-to-door inquiries in and around Earl's Court and West Brompton, and questioned members of the gay community and members of the public travelling on the tube network. Numerous suspects, including several known sex offenders, were questioned but eliminated from the inquiry.

Initial media reports indicate the last confirmed sighting of Allen was made by Ian Fletcher as he observed Allen descending the escalator to the southbound Piccadilly line platform at King's Cross; however, later reports—allegedly corroborated by his brother Kevin—indicate Allen had returned home at approximately 5 p.m. to retrieve the money to give to his sister-in-law as payment towards his digital watch before quickly leaving the household. (Note: Kevin Allen would later claim the reports of his having last seen his brother at approximately 5 p.m. were inaccurate.)

=== Televised reconstruction ===
Four weeks after Allen's disappearance, a reconstruction of his movements from Old Street station along the tube network was broadcast on the BBC current affairs programme Nationwide. Police received six reports of sightings of a man "forcibly guiding a small boy, his hand on the back of the boy's neck" onto a train at Gloucester Road tube station at 4:15 p.m. on 5 November, approximately half an hour after Ian Fletcher had last seen Allen at King's Cross station. The train had been a Piccadilly line train bound for Earl's Court station, and the boy had been dressed in grey trousers and a dark blue blazer emblazoned with a crest similar to that of Central Foundation Boys' School. He had also been carrying a yellow schoolbag.

One of two composite drawings released to the media in December 1979 of the man seen with a boy strongly believed to be Martin Allen.

==== Suspect description ====
Each witness described the man as being in his thirties, and several reported he had been standing with his arm around the boy's shoulder, who closely resembled Allen. The boy had appeared distressed and both appeared to be nervous as they boarded the train. One of the eyewitnesses had seen the man prod the boy in the back before stating: "Don't try to run!" The pair left the train at Earl's Court station—the man again warning the boy against attempting to run.

The witnesses described the man as reasonably well-spoken, white, in his thirties, approximately 6 feet 0 inches (1.83 m) in height and with distinctive blonde hair and a prominent moustache. He had been wearing a mid-blue denim jacket and trousers, and a shirt and tie. A composite drawing of this individual was released to the media on 8 December.

=== Further police efforts ===
Before the Nationwide broadcast, the search had been largely focused around North London. Afterwards, with eyewitness accounts of Allen's movements with a man, investigators concentrated their search for Allen and his abductor in West London, particularly near Gloucester Road and Earl's Court. The evident intimidation used in the abduction further solidified investigators' belief the motive behind Allen's abduction was sexual, and that he had likely been abducted by a member of a paedophile ring.

The police effort to identify the man seen with Allen included London's biggest ever house-to-house search at the time, with officers visiting over 40,000 homes around Earl's Court and showing residents the composite drawing released to the media. The identikit picture was also widely disseminated via police and media across London, although no member of the public was definitively able to identify the man depicted, and no individual came forward to identify himself as the individual seen with the schoolboy and thus eliminate himself from the inquiry.

== Renewed anniversary appeals ==
On the first anniversary of Allen's disappearance, a further public appeal was broadcast on the regional current affairs series The London Programme on 7 November 1980. The documentary was accompanied by an extensive Evening News article. These appeals resulted in over three hundred calls to the incident room at Kensington police station, but all the new leads were fruitless.

=== Potential link to subsequent murder ===
On 29 July 1981, an eight-year-old boy named Vishal Mehrotra disappeared while walking home alone from a newsagents to his father's Putney home after watching the wedding of Prince Charles and Lady Diana Spencer with members of his family. Sections of his body were discovered in West Sussex the following year. Mehrotra is also strongly believed to have been abducted and murdered by a paedophile ring.

The circumstances of Mehotra's abduction, close to the tube network on a weekday evening, led investigators to tentatively link the two cases.

== Cold case ==
Despite an extensive police investigation, which saw over 50,000 people questioned, over 600 witness statements collected, and over 200 persons of interest questioned and eliminated as suspects, investigators ultimately received few tangible leads, and Allen's disappearance remained unsolved. The man seen in his company was never identified. (Note: Serial killer Dennis Nilsen was twice questioned in relation to Allen's disappearance following his arrest in 1983; he denied any knowledge of the abduction. Police also questioned child molester and murderer Sidney Cooke, but he did cooperate.)

By the mid-1980s, the case had largely become cold, and the Metropolitan Police formally closed the investigation, although senior investigators emphasised the fact Allen's disappearance remained unsolved was not for a lack of police effort.

== Later investigations ==
The Metropolitan Police formally reopened their investigation into Allen's disappearance in 2009, with the officer leading the renewed inquiry stating that police were baffled that, despite an extensive inquiry at the time and a positive response from the public, the case remained unsolved. The same year, police informed two of Allen's brothers that the original investigation files had been destroyed in a flood at Kensington police station.

Despite pursuing several renewed leads, the investigation was again closed down in 2013. In February 2015, the Cabinet Office announced the discovery of four further files relating to ongoing child abuse inquiries—some of which allegedly focused on members of parliament. Investigators confirmed the files—one of which had been marked for destruction—would be given to police, although they refused to publicly disclose either the titles of the files or their contents.

By 2009, Allen's parents and siblings had long conceded they had no hope of ever seeing him alive, believing him to have been abducted—likely by a paedophile ring—and murdered. Both parents added their wish to know what had happened to their son, and why, prior to their own deaths, with Eileen (then aged 81), stating: "We just want to know what happened so we can have some final closure. But of course it will never go out of our minds. My biggest wish is to have a meeting of the family and a remembrance service, not a funeral, but a service so we can put our memories away."

=== Operation Fairbank and Operation Midland ===
In 2014, the Allen family were contacted by the Metropolitan Police about developments in their investigations into a paedophile ring allegedly including political figures, senior police officers and military personnel, specifically because of an investigation into historic child abuse cases occurring at the Elm Guest House in southwest London during the 1970s and 1980s. (Note: The Metropolitan Police had begun renewed investigations into historical child abuse allegations in 2012, including a re-investigation of allegations of abuse by a child sex ring at the Elm Guest House during the 1970s and 1980s.) The operation—named Operation Fairbank—had been instigated to investigate the alleged historical abuse of both male and female children by high-profile individuals, although statements (later found to be false) provided by an alleged survivor of child abuse named Carl Beech indicated some perpetrators had also murdered at least three boys abused at the Elm Guest House—possibly including Martin Allen and Vishal Mehrotra.

==== Elm Guest House allegations ====
Carl Beech (b. 1968), was a former paediatric nurse; he had first contacted the Metropolitan Police in 2012 following the Jimmy Savile sexual abuse scandal, and was first interviewed by them in 2015 as part of their Operation Midland murder investigation. (Note: Operation Midland had been established by the Metropolitan Police in 2014 to investigate claims of historical child abuse between the 1970s and 2005 allegedly overlooked due to the perpetrators being influential people. The inquiry itself had been established due to developments pertaining to Operation Fairbank.) Beech claimed to have been repeatedly abused between the ages of seven and sixteen by his stepfather, who had later introduced him to a paedophile ring who had transported him to abuse "parties" at military bases and, later, various locations within Central London. Beech claimed that he had personally seen three boys aged between ten and fourteen murdered by this child sex ring: one of whom had been deliberately run over by a car; another strangled by a Conservative MP; and the third killed in the presence of a government minister.

Beech named several individuals of prominence in his allegations, including former Conservative MP Harvey Proctor, whom he alleged had been responsible for two of the child murders and had been implicated in the third. Proctor vehemently denied all allegations.

None of the people named by Beech were arrested or charged, and all of Beech's allegations were ultimately proven to be false. Beech was later described as a fantasist in addition to himself being a paedophile. He was convicted of crimes related to lying to police in July 2019 and sentenced to eighteen years in prison. The Metropolitan Police inquiries into his false allegations ultimately cost £2 million.

== Aftermath ==
"I've only been to two fireworks displays in the past thirty years, even with my own kids—I can't do it! I've often seen kids in parks who look similar to Martin, but I've never approached them. I've known for thirty-three years that Martin wasn't ever going to come back ... I just want the people who were responsible to be brought to justice."

— Kevin Allen, in 2013.

Allen's family have long believed he is dead, that the motive behind his abduction was sexual, and the reason they had sensed a lackadaisical investigation was because the police wanted to protect senior political or influential figures who may have been involved in the abduction.

The scale of police efforts to locate Martin Allen—with accompanying publicity—had only increased in intensity five days after his disappearance, and his brother Kevin later recollected that "within a couple of months" of the event, the family suspected that senior police were performing protocol procedures with little or no sincere effort to locate Martin. His brother Jeffrey alleged in the 2010s that weeks after his brother's disappearance, the family had been informed by a senior officer that "high-up people [were] involved" and that, for their own safety, they should stop pursuing and publicising the event or "someone will get hurt".

Theories about the exact circumstances behind Allen's disappearance, those responsible, and their motives remain unproven.

== See also ==
- Child abduction
- Cold case
- List of kidnappings
- List of people who disappeared mysteriously: 1910–1990

== Cited works and further reading ==
- Collins, James J. (1999). Law Enforcement Policies and Practices Regarding Missing Children and Homeless Youth. United States: Office of Juvenile Justice and Delinquency Prevention. ISBN 978-0-788-18639-4.
- Cooper, Paulette (1994). Reward!. New York City: Pocket Books. ISBN 978-0-671-87020-1.
- Crockett, Arthur (1990). Serial Murderers. New York City: Kensington Publishing Corporation. ISBN 978-1-558-17432-0.
- Davis, Liz; Duckett, Nora (2016). Proactive Child Protection and Social Work. Los Angeles: Sage Publishing. ISBN 978-0-857-25973-8.
- Fisher, Bonnie S.; Lab, Steven P. (2010). Encyclopedia of Victimology and Crime Prevention. Los Angeles: Sage Publishing. ISBN 978-1-412-96047-2.
- Gill, Anton (1984). Martin Allen is Missing. London: Corgi Press. ISBN 978-0-552-12466-9.
- Greene, Dr. Karen Shalev; Alys, Llian (2016). Missing Persons: A Handbook of Research. London: Routledge. ISBN 978-1-409-46802-8.
- Halber, Deborah (2014). The Skeleton Crew: How Amateur Sleuths Are Solving America's Cold Cases. Cambridge: Cambridge University Press. ISBN 978-1-107-04145-5.
- Jenkins, Philip (1992). Intimate Enemies: Moral Panics in Contemporary Great Britain. New York: Aldine de Gruyter. ISBN 978-0-202-36692-0.
- Malton, Jackie; Mulholland, Hélène (2022). The Real Prime Suspect: From the Beat to the Screen. My Life as a Female Detective. London: Octopus. ISBN 978-1-913-06899-8.
- Pettem, Silvia (2017). The Long Term Missing: Hope and Help for Families. Maryland: Rowman & Littlefield. ISBN 978-1-442-25680-4.
- Sanders, John (2016). "Death of a Serial Killer: Robert Black's Timeline of Terror". True Detective Monthly (April 2016 ed.). Magazine Design & Publishing Ltd. pp. 8–15. ISSN 0041-350X.
- Shaw-Smith, Scott (2015). Vanishing Act - People Who Disappeared Mysteriously or Did They?. North Carolina: Lulu Enterprises Incorporated. ISBN 978-1-326-46952-8.
- Stewart, Erin (2021). The Missing Among Us: Stories of Missing Persons and Those Left Behind. New South Wales: NewSouth Publishing. ISBN 978-1-742-23679-7.
