= Elm Guest House hoax =

English sexual abuse allegations

The Elm Guest House was a hotel in Rocks Lane, near Barnes Common in southwest London. In a list produced by convicted fraudster Chris Fay, several prominent British men were alleged to have engaged in sexual abuse and child grooming at the Guest House in the late 1970s and early 1980s. Labour MP Tom Watson, having heard testimony from Carl Beech, suggested, in an October 2012 statement to the House of Commons, that a paedophile network which had existed at this time may have brought children to parties at the private residence.

During 2014 and 2015, allegations against several leading politicians of the period, mostly now deceased, were made public in the British press. Many of these claims were examined and discredited in an October 2015 episode of the BBC current affairs television programme, Panorama.

The role of the guest house became the subject of a Metropolitan Police Service investigation known as Operation Fairbank in late 2012. The purpose of this "scoping exercise" was to assess Watson's claims. As a result of allegations arising from Operation Fairbank, a full criminal investigation called Operation Fernbridge was launched in February 2013. No evidence of abuse connected to the Elm Guest House was uncovered, and the operation was closed in March 2015. Another investigation, Operation Midland, was set up to examine claims of possible murders. A subsequent inquiry found that those investigated by Operation Midland had been victims of false allegations. In November 2016, the then-Metropolitan Police commissioner, Bernard Hogan-Howe, made a personal apology to the innocent parties involved. In May 2019, Beech, who was himself found to be a child sex offender, was placed on trial, charged with perverting the course of justice and fraud, which he denied. Beech was found guilty and sentenced to 18 years in jail in July 2019.

== Elm Guest House ==
The three-storey Elm Guest House was in Rocks Lane, close to Barnes Common in southwest London. It had eight guest rooms, and its facilities included a sauna, solarium and video studio. The Edwardian house has since been converted into two-bedroom apartments, and the current occupants are not connected to the allegations.

In the 1970s, Elm Guest House owners Haroon and Carole Kasir allowed male prostitutes to take their clients to the establishment. A party was raided by the police in 1982 and the Kasirs were charged with running a disorderly house. The identities of the men who attended the party are not known and have been the subject of much speculation in subsequent years. By 2012, The Independent described the house as a "conspiracy theorist's dream".

Carole Kasir died in 1990 at the age of 47; an inquest found that the cause of death was suicide due to an overdose of insulin.

== Background ==
=== History of claims ===
In 1990, according to journalist James Hanning, Chris Fay, a Labour councillor, convicted fraudster and a campaigner for the National Association of Young People in Care, claimed on oath that former Home Secretary Leon Brittan had been involved in abuse and that, in March 1990, he had seen a photograph of Brittan with a young boy. He said the picture had been shown to him by Carole Kasir, co-owner of the Elm Guest House, who died weeks later. Fay alleged that children from the Grafton Close Children's Home in Richmond, southwest London, had told him they had been trafficked to Elm Guest House. He drew up a list of public figures that he said victims had told him had stayed at the Elm Guest House.

The list included former government ministers, senior MPs, top police officers, judges, pop music stars, and people with links to the Royal Households. It was uploaded to the internet.

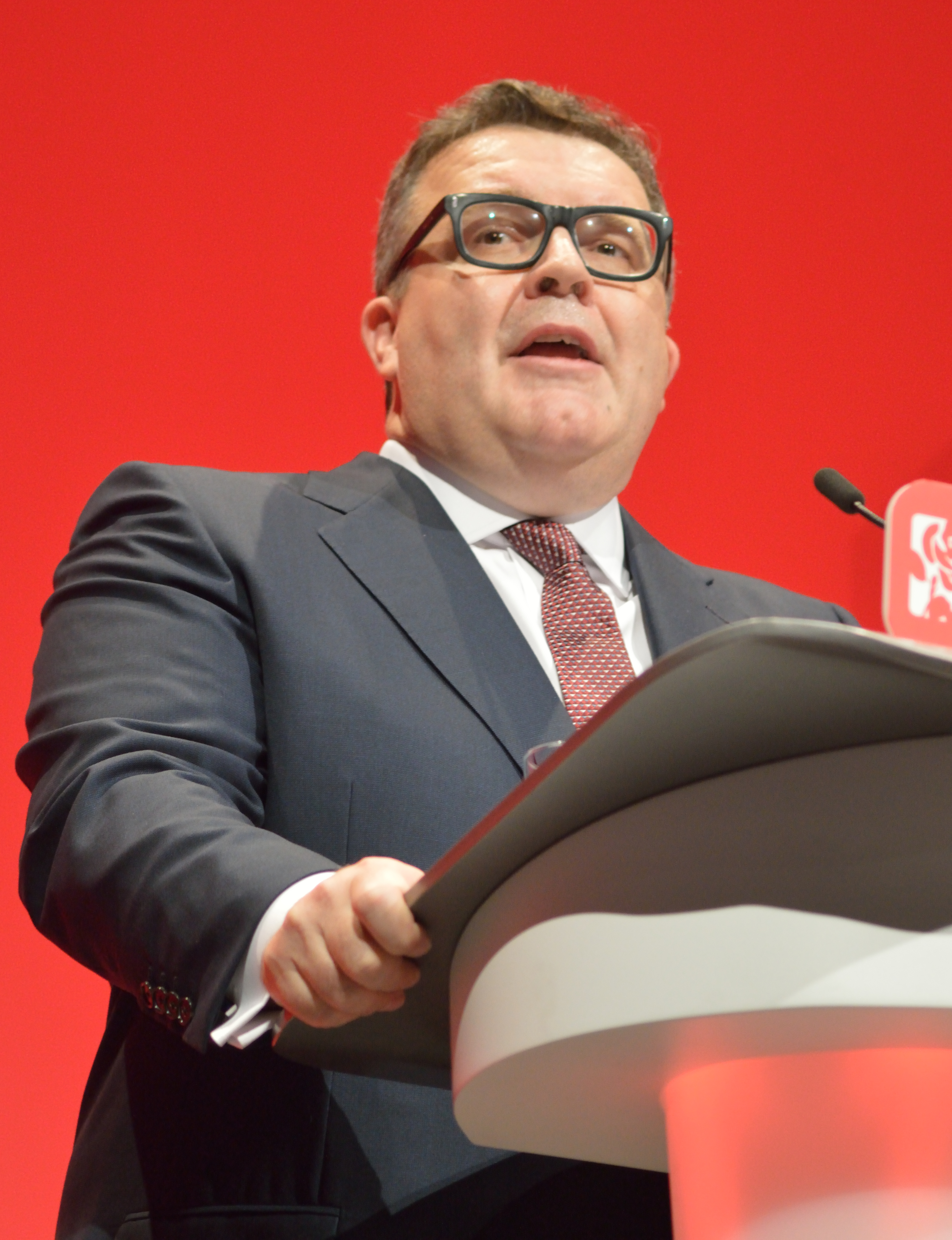
Tom Watson addressed the accusations in the House of Commons

In the aftermath of the Jimmy Savile sexual abuse scandal in October 2012, Labour MP Tom Watson said in the House of Commons he had evidence that there was a "powerful paedophile network linked to Parliament and Number 10". Watson made his comments after having been passed information from the investigative news website Exaro. With the public upset that Jimmy Savile was never properly investigated over his alleged crimes, the Metropolitan Police launched Operation Fairbank as a scoping exercise to examine Watson's claims. Watson set up a meeting with Fay and others to discuss the allegations in 2013 but Fay was dis-invited before the meeting after concerns were raised about his reliability. After the meeting, Watson was warned about the reliability of the accusations.

In July 2014, a journalist from Exaro introduced Watson to Carl Beech, who falsely accused Brittan and others of abuse. Watson wrote to the Director of Public Prosecutions to reopen a separate rape investigation into Brittan that police had previously closed after finding no evidence to support the claim and "glaring inconsistencies" in the accuser's account. Police ultimately decided that Brittan would face no further action but he was never told he would not be charged before his death in January 2015. After Brittan's death, Watson wrote a newspaper column in which he quoted Beech, calling Brittan "as close to evil as a human being could get".

=== Claims are challenged and discredited ===
In an edition of Panorama broadcast on 6 October 2015, a former Elm Guest House prostitute was interviewed who claimed that he was unaware of any MPs visiting the brothel. Journalist John Oakes told them he had investigated Chris Fay's claims, but had never been able to find any "solid" information nor trace of photos Fay said he had seen. A man named Mark stated that he had been an abuse victim at Grafton Close but had never been to Elm Guest House and had never spoken to Fay. Another person interviewed by Panorama said they named Brittan as their abuser only after being pressured by Fay. The Daily Telegraph later reported that Fay had been jailed for fraud in 2011. Fay said he regretted starting a "witch-hunt".

In late 2015, Watson was criticised for consistently refusing to comment after it was revealed that the police had been pressured into investigating rape allegations against Brittan by Watson. That November, Watson apologised to Brittan's widow and her family for the distress caused by the investigation. Metropolitan police commissioner Bernard Hogan-Howe issued an apology of his own in February 2016 for mishandling the investigation.

== Criminal investigations ==
=== Operation Fairbank ===
The police investigation known as Operation Fairbank was an umbrella inquiry first set up under conditions of secrecy in November 2012. The Independent on Sunday reported that it focused on claims of sexual abuse and the grooming of children, involving parties for men at the former Elm Guest House. Police also investigated historic allegations from the Grafton Close Children's Home. Operation Fairbank caused much speculation on the internet but did not uncover the alleged paedophile ring.

=== Operation Fernbridge ===
A full criminal investigation, Operation Fernbridge, was launched as a result of allegations that arose from Operation Fairbank. Operation Fernbridge investigated allegations concerning both Grafton Close children's home and Elm Guest House.

Two men connected to the Grafton Close children's home: Tony McSweeney, a Catholic priest from Norwich, and John Stingemore, a former children's home manager, were arrested on suspicion of sexual offences and questioned by child investigation officers from Operation Fernbridge in February 2013. A trial against Tony McSweeney started at Southwark Crown Court in February 2015. However, John Stingemore was found dead at his home in January 2015 whilst still awaiting trial. McSweeney was later convicted of his charges and sentenced to prison.

Although arrests from Operation Fernbridge did result in a conviction stemming from Grafton Close children's home, it did not expose abuse related to Elm Guest House. After McSweeney's conviction, Operation Fernbridge was closed and investigations related to Elm Guest House were taken over by Operation Athabasca. Metropolitan Police Commander Neil Jerome gave evidence on Operation Athabasca's findings to the Independent Inquiry into Child Sexual Abuse (IICSA) on 14 February 2019. Jerome concluded that "Other than the child removed from Elm Guest House during the raid, no credible victim has ever come forward alleging a specific offence suffered whilst at Elm Guest House" and that no prominent person had ever been conclusively identified as having abused a child there, although the subsequent medical examination had shown that this particular 10-year-old boy "had been extensively anally raped".

=== Operation Midland ===
In July 2014, Exaro began publishing articles in which Carl Beech, then known publicly under the pseudonym "Nick", falsely accused prominent men of having abused him. Four months later, Beech told Operation Fairbank detectives that he had been abused by a VIP gang of paedophiles for over a decade at various locations, including at the Elm Guest House and Dolphin Square, and that he had witnessed them murder three boys. The murders of Vishal Mehrotra, Martin Allen and another boy were subsequently investigated as part of Operation Midland.

Based only on Beech's claims, Operation Midland investigated Edward Heath, Leon Brittan, Edwin Bramall, Harvey Proctor and others. An inquiry conducted by Richard Henriques found that those accused had been victims of false allegations and Metropolitan Police Commissioner Hogan-Howe subsequently apologised to the living suspects (Bramall and Proctor) and Brittan's widow.

In May 2019, Beech was placed on trial, charged with 12 counts of perverting the course of justice and one of fraud, which he denied. Before his trial started, Beech pleaded guilty to child pornography offences. Beech had been viewing, downloading and creating child abuse images during the same period in which he had been lying to police. On 22 July 2019, Beech was found guilty of making up the Westminster VIP paedophile ring. He was jailed for 18 years on 26 July.

== See also ==
- Pizzagate conspiracy theory
