= Operation Midland =

Metropolitan Police investigation into historic child abuse claims (2014–2016)

Operation Midland was a criminal investigation carried out by the London Metropolitan Police between November 2014 and March 2016 in response to false allegations of historic child abuse made by Carl Beech.

The operation focused on investigation of several high-profile British citizens—politicians, military officers and heads of security—over claims of historic child sexual abuse and murder.

The 18-month operation found no evidence to support the claims, and an inquiry into the police investigation afterwards concluded that the people involved had been falsely accused, leaving them dealing with considerable damage to their lives and reputations. A report of the inquiry's findings found that detectives and officers within the operation's taskforce had committed several errors during the course of their work, and made calls for more effective checks on allegations and accountability by police.

Following the reporting of the inquiry's findings, the Metropolitan Police were forced to make apologies to those who had been accused and to compensate them financially. The outcome of the operation damaged the organisation's reputation, already impacted by government pressure to improve its handling of abuse cases. It was concluded that, as a consequence, genuine victims of abuse might be discouraged from coming forward. The inquiry's handling was criticised by some of the accused in Operation Midland. Carl Beech, the perpetrator of the false allegations, was later investigated for perverting the course of justice and was himself found to be a child sex offender. He was later arrested and charged, and sentenced to 18 years in prison in July 2019.

== Background ==
In the wake of the Jimmy Savile scandal in 2012, police were facing mounting pressure to investigate any and all cases of child abuse, particularly of a historic nature, reported by victims either directly to officers, or through interviews with journalists. Growing national public outcry over the possibility of there being more VIP serial abusers concealing their actions, and political campaigns demanding greater action to investigate cases of historic abuse, greatly affected the need for police to step up their efforts.

In 2014, journalist Mark Conrad came across an online blog containing allegations of a potential case of historic abuse, created by Carl Beech – a Wiltshire man born Carl Stephen Gass in 1968, who assumed the surname of his stepfather, a military officer, after his parents divorced and his mother remarried. Conrad made contact with Beech to discuss his blog and its contents, in which he was given detailed allegations by Beech about abuse he claimed he had suffered from a group of powerful men, including his stepfather, during his youth. During meetings with Beech, Conrad was taken to various locations and given accounts of what Beech had allegedly been made to endure between 1975 and 1984 at each site. Conrad made further confirmation about his abuser's identities, by showing un-marked photos to Beech for him to identify those he had named.

Conrad posted his inquiries into the blog and its allegations in a story for the investigative journalism website Exaro, providing Beech with the pseudonym of "Nick" to conceal his identity, as is common practice for protecting victims of abuse from their abusers. Conrad's story was picked up by detectives in the Metropolitan Police, who made requests to see his source, and agreed to Beech's request to allow the journalist to attend their initial informal meeting with him. In later formal police interviews, which Conrad did not attend, Beech gave full, detailed accounts of the abuse he claimed he had been subjected to at various locations, including the Elm Guest House, the Dolphin Square apartment block in Pimlico, the Carlton Club, and various other locations in the Home Counties.

Most concerning for detectives were Beech's claims that he, alongside a number of other child victims of the group, had been witness to three murders – Beech claimed that two children were killed for sexual pleasure, while a third was eliminated to intimidate the other abuse victims – in which he supplied the names of two individuals who he stated had been murdered by the group: Vishal Mehrotra, whose abduction and the subsequent murder in the early 1980s remained unsolved, and Martin Allen, whose disappearance was documented in the late 1970s. Metropolitan Police deemed Beech's accounts "credible and true", though what he told them turned out to be entirely false.

In November 2014, the Metropolitan Police announced a large-scale investigation, codenamed Operation Midland, into Beech's claims. The Met recruited a taskforce of detectives and experienced officers, led by Detective Superintendent Kenny McDonald, to handle the investigation, and modelled the operation after Operation Yewtree, a similar investigation conducted by police that had investigated several VIPs over child abuse allegations.

== Criminal investigation ==
=== Announcement and political support ===
Once Operation Midland was under way, the police began their focus on the men whom Beech had implicated as being members of a VIP child abuse ring. Those he had named included the former Members of Parliament Harvey Proctor and Lord Janner, the former Home Secretary Lord Brittan, former Prime Minister Edward Heath, former Chief of the Defence Staff Lord Bramall, the former Director of the Secret Intelligence Service Maurice Oldfield, and former Director-General of MI5 Michael Hanley.

While most had long been dead, those still alive were subsequently informed they were under investigation regarding the allegations against them; Proctor himself learnt from his solicitors that the allegation against him included claims that he had stabbed a 12-year-old boy before strangling him to death. He then held a press conference to give the public details of the police's accounts of the claims, along with the names of those accused on similar charges.

Appeals were sent out for further information and witness reports in regards to the allegations of child abuse and possible homicide, alongside any other potential activities of a similar nature that could have taken place near the Houses of Parliament between the 1970s and 1980s. Alleged contemporaneous incidents across London and at military establishments were also placed under investigation.

Public support for the case was increased by the influence of Labour politician Tom Watson, the future deputy leader, who had campaigned in support of investigations into historic abuse. Watson had met Beech prior to the start of the police operation following his Exaro story, and remained in intermittent contact with him as the operation began, showing his support of Beech's allegations by accusing the named men; when interviewed about the matter, Watson publicly spoke out against Lord Brittan, one of the accused, as being "close to evil" based on Beech's accounts. Conservative politician Zac Goldsmith spoke out in support of the allegations against Lord Brittan, while former Labour politician John Mann compiled a dossier of his own, containing allegations against 22 high-profile individuals, which he passed on to police.

By 2015, police were conducting extensive searches for documents and articles that could support the accusations against the accused – the homes of both Bramall in Yorkshire and Proctor on the estate of Belvoir Castle, in Leicestershire, were searched in March, while the home of Lord Brittan was raided six weeks after his death, with computers, hard drives and documents removed for examination.

=== Concerns about falsehood ===
Despite a search for abuse victims connected to the allegations made by Beech, no credible individuals could be found by police. Shortly after Beech's claims of abuse were announced by Metropolitan Police, another accuser came forward to make further accusations against Lord Brittan and statements of witnessing two murders committed by the group. Although given anonymity and referenced by detectives under the name of "Darren", the Metropolitan Police questioned the validity of the claims, and eventually determined them to be potentially false.

Despite this line of inquiry no longer being feasible to pursue, the claims of "Darren" were passed over to Suffolk police to further investigate. Detectives in Suffolk interviewed six people under caution before eventually dropping the case in September 2015 on grounds of insufficient evidence.

Suffolk Police's decision to drop the accusations of "Darren" led to detectives within Operation Midland to question the justification of launching the probe into the twelve men based only on the words of Beech's accusations. Their concerns were further increased after another accuser – hidden under anonymity with the name "David" – admitted to detectives that he had been falsely claiming that he had been abused by some of the men stated in Beech's accusation, including Lord Brittan.

Journalists for the BBC investigation series Panorama, investigating the inquiry, interviewed "David" over his revelation to police. He told them he had decided to recant his accusations due to feelings of guilt. "David" had never met the people he named; his accusations were initially meant "as a joke", and the claims had been supplied by "two well-known campaigners" he had met.

Concerned that police would charge people on the basis of false accusations, "David" said that "maybe the police could stop putting their efforts into things that probably aren’t even true".

=== Collapse of investigation ===
Fourteen months after Operation Midland began, detectives concluded there was insufficient evidence and no credible witnesses to support the continuation of investigations against the accused. The statements of those interviewed by police who had worked with the accused provided no support for the accused having been abusers during the 1970s and 1980s, and subsequent interviews with the accused revealed total denial of the accusations made against them: Proctor denied being part of any "rent-boy ring" or attending sex parties with prominent figures, while Bramall denied having "a connection or anything to do with the matters being investigated. It is not in my character or my psyche."

Public support for the investigation eventually began to wane after Proctor held a press conference to denounce the police's operation and the allegations against himself and the others, and further after the findings of both the Panorama investigation and those conducted by the Daily Mail. Over the course of three months in 2016, between January and March, the Metropolitan Police began to drop the charges against each member of the accused, saying that they would take no further action against them, before eventually shutting down the police operation.

== Police conduct inquiry ==
With no sufficient evidence being uncovered or credible witnesses being located by detectives working within Operation Midland, and growing criticism that the investigation was becoming a baseless "witch-hunt", the then–Commissioner of the Metropolitan Police, Bernard Hogan-Howe, ordered in February 2016 for an immediate inquiry into the operation to be conducted, a month before its conclusion. Retired judge Sir Richard Henriques headed the inquiry by the Independent Office for Police Conduct (IOPC) to determine the overall conduct of officers and detectives during Operation Midland. An extensive check was made into several areas, including how thoroughly police had looked into the allegations they had received from Beech, the treatment detectives had given to those accused by him, and the manner in which evidence had been acquired. Henriques' findings, released in his report in November 2016, uncovered several errors that the Metropolitan Police had made in their investigations, amongst which were:

- A failure to conduct a background check on Carl Beech – Metropolitan Police were unaware he had approached Wiltshire Police two years previously, over claims that he had been a victim of abuse from Jimmy Savile. The inquiry showed that such a check would have alerted detectives that his story to them in 2014 had inconsistencies and could therefore have been identified as being false.
- Unfair treatment of the accused – a police policy designed to protect the identity of victims and not their abusers, was chiefly blamed for the group being harshly treated during the operation. The inquiry found that despite the lack of evidence to support Beech's allegations, the accused men were subjected to unwanted media attention after their identities were publicly disclosed, while detectives presumed them guilty without just cause.
- A failure to prioritise the search for important witnesses – detectives failed to secure those connected to the accused in the initial weeks due to Beech claiming discomfort on his alleged abuse, while they wasted time seeking out others of significant relevance to the investigation. Those connected to Beech had not been contacted after considerable time, while the search to cross-out possible names connected to those Beech had identified in his accounts as being murdered wasted months of police time.
- Search warrants were not legally valid – inaccurate and/or false information was supplied by detectives requesting these from magistrates. The inquiry found that these warrants were severely flawed, as detectives had failed to double-check the information supplied to them by Beech and vouched for him as a "credible" witness, thus invalidating the raids they committed against the homes of the accused.

=== Analysis ===
Henriques's report condemned the actions of the Metropolitan Police, and voiced support for, amongst other things, providing anonymity to suspected abusers until sufficient evidence had been found. In regards to those accused and investigated by the police, Henriques made it clear in his findings that the men had been "all victims of false allegations" with it firmly noted that the "presumption of innocence appears to have been set aside." The IOPC made clear that, from these mistakes uncovered, future public accountability and reassurances needed to be addressed by British police, with recommendations for possible audio recordings of court hearings for search warrants and renewed efforts to balance the acceptance of a victim's allegations with the objective need to investigate such claims.

In response to the findings made in the report, Hogan-Howe admitted that, in his opinion, the mistakes and errors that occurred during Operation Midland stemmed from an over-reaction to "apparent mistakes back in 2012 relating to revelations of very serious and serial child abuse, a mixture of public outrage and propaganda" which "put immense pressure through the Home Secretary, on the police". However, the decision by the IOPC to excuse detectives, and thus not prosecute any officer for their mistakes in Operation Midland, were heavily criticised by Proctor and several politicians – they believed the IOPC had failed in not pursuing charges on possible misconduct in order to maintain that detectives acted in "good faith" with their investigations. Henriques himself noted that, despite his findings and general acceptance of the mistakes made, the inquiries made by the IOPC had been "flawed".

== Investigation impact ==
=== Damage to victims ===
The overall impact of Beech's allegations created considerable damage towards the lives of the men investigated by police. For some, the damage ruined their reputations and their trust with the police; in Harvey Proctor's case, the false claims effectively cost him his home and his job. But the emotional cost of the allegations was far greater in magnitude, both for the accused and their families, in their fight to deny and defend the accusations against them from both the police and media coverage.

For some, the cost was made more severe – some of the accused and relatives of those named, died during the course of the operation, and would never know that the accusations by detectives would be dropped. In the wake of the report into Operation Midland, Hogan-Howe was forced to personally apologise to some of the victims of the investigation for their treatment, including Bramall, Lord Brittan's widow, and Proctor.

Proctor later commented about the impact of the investigation on those falsely accused stating that: "I do believe it is profoundly un-British and unfair. ... I believe I have been pilloried and the Met Police service has enabled me to be wrongly depicted as a paedophile, child abuser, child murderer." He also added that for those affected, it had been the "worst things that can be said of a human being." Watson himself had to apologise to Lady Brittan for his comments against her husband, while police were forced to apologise to Martin Allen's family for mistakenly claiming that he had been murdered by the group based upon Beech's false claims.

=== Negative impact on future abuse investigations ===
Despite Hogan-Howe backing the findings of Henriques's report into the operation's conduct, including the need for anonymity protection for those accused until sufficient evidence was provided to support allegations against them, charities supporting victims of abuse and British policing voiced clear concerns that Operation Midland had created uncertainty amongst abuse victims, stating that the entire operation's conduct, and its subsequent revelation that it had been based on false information, had left genuine victims likely to question if police would consider their claims credible enough to investigate.

Watson remained adamant in support of abuse victims coming out against their abusers, though his own conduct was placed under considerable doubt after further inquiries deemed that he had pressured officers extensively to investigate Beech's claims without realising that he was being misled.

When the Panorama exposé was due to be broadcast in 2015, Metropolitan Police became "worried that this programme and other recent reporting will deter victims and witnesses from coming forward in future. Seeing an individual make allegations and then be targeted by the media is not going to encourage others to speak out".

Proctor called on Hogan-Howe to resign in the midst of the calamitous police operation, stating that Operation Midland "has had a disastrous effect on genuine complaints of child sexual abuse, both present and historical. I think it has been incredibly counterproductive. ... And when they established the truth – some time ago I think – they were too afraid of each other and the media to pull the plug."

=== Financial costs ===
For the Metropolitan Police, the cost of belatedly investigating Beech's allegations was severe. Over the eighteen months that Operation Midland was in effect, detectives spent over £2 million; when it was clear that false allegations had been made, further costs were incurred – the investigation into Beech's allegations, handled by Northumbria Police, added a further £900,000, while the police were forced to compensate both Lord Bramall and Lady Brittan, at a cost of £100,000, for illegally entering their homes for documents and evidence without possessing a legal warrant. Proctor, who had been affected considerably by the investigation, lodged a lawsuit against the Metropolitan Police for compensation over their behaviour against him. The case was settled in 2019, the defendants paying him £900,000 in compensation and legal costs.

== Police action ==
=== Assessment of Beech allegations ===
One of the significant errors detectives made in Operation Midland was to fully accept the allegations made by Carl Beech without objectively investigating the credibility of his claims. As the operation began to reach its conclusion in March 2016, the taskforce began to re-check the accounts given by Beech, and slowly began to unravel his deception.

Unknown to the Metropolitan Police at the time he made his allegations, Beech had previously attempted to submit a claim of abuse to Wiltshire Police in 2012, in the wake of the Savile scandal: his claim at the time alleged that his stepfather, along with Jimmy Savile and a group of unidentified men, had abused him considerably.

Detectives who investigated these allegations eventually concluded them to be unfounded, based on certain facts, which included his family situation in particular: his stepfather was married to his mother for only a few months before they divorced, and, shortly afterwards, retired from the army on mental health grounds.

Prior to Operation Midland, Beech had continued to put forth claims that he had been abused, including appearing in a short-lived documentary series concerning the possible male victims of Savile's abuse, in order to support his allegations. He then turned to online blogs to spread his false claims: by 2014, he had become obsessed with public attention to potential historic abuse cases and their impact within British society, paying particular attention to rising conspiracy theories surrounding a possible cover-up amongst the British establishment, including the disappearance of significant documents concerning potential abuse cases.

Not knowing Beech's dismissed claim of 2012 in Wiltshire meant that detectives unwittingly supported Beech in making a fraudulent claim for compensation in connection to the Savile scandal, Beech receiving around £22,000 from the Criminal Injuries Compensation Authority.

=== Perversion of justice investigation ===
Toward the end of Operation Midland's lifespan, police had begun to doubt Beech's allegations. Beech began to distance himself from the Metropolitan Police, cancelling interviews and withdrawing his further co-operation with detectives.

On 2 November 2016, the Metropolitan Police contacted Northumbria Police to investigate Beech over a possible charge of perverting the course of justice. Alongside a search of his home within Gloucestershire, where he resided, for documents and evidence, detectives made a full check of the evidence he had supplied to the Metropolitan Police, and requested access to his school and medical records. Their findings confirmed that the serious allegations that Beech had made were completely false, and had wasted police time and resources: unpublished works of fantasy he had written showed that Beech was a fantasist who amused himself by playing out fantasies of being a victim of violent child abuse, enjoying the attention it would bring him, with little regard for the consequences and the damage it would cause.

Many of the claims surrounding the abuse Beech had purported to have endured, and the effect it had had on his life, were contradicted by the records accessed by detectives, while many areas of his account were based upon various ongoing and closed abuse cases that he had extensively researched on the internet: in particular, sketches he supplied to the Metropolitan Police were found to be photocopies of those that had been already published, rather than original drawings, while his murder allegations were influenced by his research of online media stories surrounding the death of Vishal Mehrotra and the disappearance of Martin Allen, which led to published journalistic speculation that these two cases may have been connected to a large child abuse ring.

Much of Beech's co-operation itself was conducted with subtle deceptions on his part: in one case, a detective unwittingly kept Beech apprised of the ongoing raids made against some of the accused after Beech had lied to them that Exaro was working on another piece connected to child abuse. In another case, detectives unknowingly passed to Beech questions he was to have answered in their inquiries, in the belief they were actually talking to a friend of his through an e-mail address Beech had supplied to them.

Detectives subsequently found that Beech himself was a prolific child abuser who was already under investigation for a number of child sex offences, including voyeurism and making and possessing indecent images of children. These offences took place whilst he was co-operating with Operation Midland and simultaneously working for the National Society for the Prevention of Cruelty to Children (NSPCC). Based upon these investigations and findings, Beech was arrested, with the NSPCC, in the wake of his arrest, stripping him of his role and commitments to their organisation.

Whilst on bail, Beech failed to appear at Worcester Crown Court for trial and fled to Sweden in 2017, evading capture for two months by residing in the far north of the country, using multiple aliases: an extensive manhunt led to his capture and subsequent extradition back to Britain.

=== Trial of Carl Beech ===
In July 2018, after extensive interviews with detectives over his unsubstantiated claims, Beech was charged with twelve counts of perverting the course of justice and one count of fraud, alongside the child sex offences he had committed. In December, the reporting restrictions in the case were lifted, allowing him to be publicly identified.

In May 2019, Beech was placed on trial at Newcastle Crown Court, but denied the charges against him, continuing to pursue claims that his allegations were true despite the evidence to the contrary. The motives attributed to his actions varied, and were determined to be a mixture of a need for money – Beech had debts due to his spending habits – and his desire for the attention his claims granted him. Jenny Hopkins, the prosecutor in the case, made clear that Beech's actions were those of a man who was not a victim, but rather a "manipulative, prolific, deceitful liar".

On 22 July 2019, Beech was found guilty of all charges, and sentenced four days later to 18 years in prison. He was released on licence in February 2026.
