= Death of Vishal Mehrotra =

1981 unsolved British death in London

Vishal Mehrotra
- Born: 27 September 1972; India
- Disappeared: 29 July 1981 (aged 8); Putney, London, England
- Body discovered: 25 February 1982
- Parents: Vishambar Mehrotra (father); Aruna Mehrotra (mother)

Vishal Mehrotra (27 September 1972 – on or after 29 July 1981) was an eight-year-old boy who was abducted from Putney, London, England, on 29 July 1981. Mehrotra's partial remains were discovered on 25 February 1982 on an isolated farm in West Sussex. The killers were never identified and no one has ever been charged.

In May 2023, Sussex Police announced they would be re-examining the case.

== Background ==
Vishal Mehrotra was born in India on 27 September 1972, and emigrated to the United Kingdom with his family from Sri Lanka in 1978. His father, Vishambar Mehrotra, was a solicitor at the time of the disappearance and is now a retired magistrate. His mother, Aruna Mehrotra, had separated from her husband and moved back to India to manage a jewellery business at the time of the disappearance. The family lived on Holmbush Road, Putney, South London. Vishal had a younger sister, who was named Mamta. The children also had a live-in nanny, Joannita Carvalho.

Vishal was described as bright and independent, with an open, friendly personality. He travelled to his school every day on his own.

== Day of the disappearance ==
On 29 July 1981, the day of the wedding of Prince Charles and Lady Diana Spencer, the Mehrotra family took the train into London in order to watch the wedding from the window of Vishambar's workplace. They then took the train back to East Putney, where they arrived around 1:40 pm. Vishambar was tired and went directly home, leaving his son and daughter with Carvalho. He gave each of them £20 (equivalent to £78.63 in 2024) to buy sweets.

Carvalho took the children to a newsagent's, where they remained for about twenty minutes. The children had complained of sore throats, so she decided to go to buy cough medicine at Putney High Street. Vishal said he was tired and wanted to walk home by himself. Carvalho consented, feeling he was independent enough to make the journey. She took him across the main road pedestrian crossing and then left him to walk the rest of the way while she took Mamta to buy the cough medicine.

Carvalho and Mamta returned home at about 3:00 pm. Vishambar was asleep in bed, but there was no sign of Vishal. Believing he had gone out to play, Carvalho and Mamta took naps until 4:30 pm. When she awoke and found Vishal had still not returned, she explained the situation to his father. The two made enquiries of neighbours as to whether they had seen the boy. When they could not find Vishal by 7 pm, he was reported missing to the Metropolitan Police.

== Initial investigation ==
The initial police investigation involved searching the vicinity of the disappearance from the air with a thermal camera, as well as ground searches of common land and the River Thames. Initially it was thought that Vishal could have tried to travel to India, though his family doubted this, and this line of inquiry was investigated by Interpol. Police additionally investigated the possibility that the boy had been abducted by a racist gang. Between the disappearance and the discovery of the body the police investigated hundreds of sightings and interviewed over 14,000 people.

== Discovery of the body ==
On 21 February 1982 two men, who were shooting pigeons, discovered a skull, seven rib bones and a section of vertebrae at Alder Copse, Durleigh Marsh Farm, Rogate, near Petersfield in Hampshire. The bones appeared to have been disturbed by foxes and were found buried in a bog at a depth of around two feet (0.6 m).

Following the discovery, a large-scale excavation and search involving about thirty police officers took place. This uncovered more bones, though no clothing was found. The bones were taken to London for forensic investigation. Initially, police believed that the body had been buried around 29 July 1981.

== Subsequent investigations ==
External videos
- YouTube videos
- In the Footsteps of Killlers Series 2 Episode 2

Police initially believed that Vishal may have been abducted by someone with local knowledge of the Durleigh Marsh Farm area.

On 29 July 2026, a £20,000 reward for information was made on the 45th anniversary of the disappearance.

=== Links to Sidney Cooke ===
In the late 1980s, a Metropolitan Police unit that had been investigating suspected serial killer Sidney Cooke's infamous "Dirty Dozen" child sex ring began to investigate whether Vishal could have been another of the gang's victims. The gang was known to have killed at least three similarly aged boys after abducting them in London in the 1980s, and always abducted them in broad daylight as in Vishal's case. It also appeared from Vishal's remains that he had been buried naked, indicating a sexual element to the killing. The "Dirty Dozen" investigative team held a meeting with Sussex Police at the time but no concrete evidence was found to link the enquiries.

In March 2015, the BBC reported that the Metropolitan Police had referred itself to the Independent Police Complaints Commission following allegations of corruption in relation to the case. Subsequently, in May 2015, Sussex Police released documents relating to a review of the murder they had carried out in 2005. The force's report on the case revealed that other police forces had in fact investigated links between Vishal's death and Sidney Cooke's gang on three occasions. The report also revealed that the Metropolitan Police's child sexual abuse unit had concluded there were "strong similarities" between Vishal's case and the gang's known killings. It is known that some members of the gang had boasted in prison of killing an 'Asian boy', and it was reported in 2015 that investigators were now looking into whether this could have been Vishal.

Roger Stoodley, who retired as the detective leading the Cooke investigation in 1992, stated in 2014 that the disappearances of Vishal and Martin Allen were in keeping with the modus operandi of Cooke's child sexual abuse gang.

=== Operation Midland ===
A few months after his son's disappearance, Vishambar Mehrotra claimed to have been contacted by an unidentified man thought to be in his twenties. This man suggested that Vishal's abduction had been connected to a group of influential child sexual offenders associated with Elm Guest House in London. The man stated that he had informed the Metropolitan Police but they had not followed up his report. Vishambar gave a recording of the telephone conversation to detectives; however, they dismissed it as a prank call and it was not followed up. The location of Vishal's disappearance was less than a mile from Elm Guest House.

Vishal's death was investigated as part of Operation Midland after Carl Beech, a purported abuse survivor, told detectives that he had been abused by a child sex ring and he had seen them murder three boys. Beech was later determined to have used his work computer to access newspaper articles speculating on connections between Vishal's death and the alleged child sex ring. In July 2019 he was convicted of 12 counts of perverting the course of justice, one of fraud, and several child sex offences. He was sentenced to 18 years in prison.

=== Links to Nicholas Douglass ===
Circa 2019, while interviewing Nicholas Douglass about an unrelated crime, Sussex Police were told about a document he had written entitled 'Vishal', written in 1983 while he was in jail for sexual abuse of children at a school. In 2020, BBC tracked down Douglass and questioned him on why he named the document 'Vishal'. Douglass said: "It's the first [name] that came into my head because it had been in the press. [There was] massive publicity and at the time." and "It was the first Asian name I could think of. That's the honest truth."

In 2020, in an interview with the BBC, Vishal's father Vishambar Mehrotra stated:

"The mere fact that it has got Vishal's name on it is amazing and astounding that they [the police] don't think it is important enough."

A three-year investigation by BBC journalist Colin Campbell suggested a possible connection between Vishal's death and a child sex ring with links to Sussex and West London that included Douglass. Some members of the group were jailed in 1998 for sexual offences against children at Muntham House School, near Horsham, West Sussex, in the 1970s and 1980s. The findings of the investigation were serialised in the BBC Sounds podcast Vishal in April 2023.

== See also ==
- List of kidnappings
- Lists of solved missing person cases
- List of unsolved murders (1980–1999)
- Murder of Claire Woolterton – 1981 abduction and murder of a child in west London, solved in 2013
- Murder of Daniel Handley – 1994 murder of a boy
- Murder of Lindsay Rimer – unsolved 1994 case in which a 13-year-old British girl disappeared from Yorkshire and was found one year later in a nearby canal
- Disappearance of Suzy Lamplugh – unsolved abduction that occurred near to Mehrotra's in 1986
