= Richard Henriques =

British judge

Sir Richard Henry Quixano Henriques (born 27 October 1943) is a British retired lawyer who was a Justice of the High Court of England and Wales.

== Early life and education ==
Henriques was born in south Fylde, educated at Southdene, in South Shore and at Lawrence House Preparatory School in Lytham St Annes, all in Lancashire. He then attended Bradfield College and then Worcester College, Oxford.

== Legal career ==
He was called to the bar (Inner Temple) in 1967 and made a bencher in 1994. Henriques was made a Queen's Counsel in 1986.

In 1993, Henriques acted as lead prosecution counsel in the James Bulger Murder Trial, during which he successfully rebutted the principle of doli incapax, which at the time presumed that young children could not be held legally responsible for their actions. In 1999, he prosecuted serial killer Dr Harold Shipman for the murders of 15 patients in his care.

He was later appointed a Crown Court Recorder, and on 19 April 2000 was appointed a High Court judge, receiving the customary knighthood, and assigned to the Queen's Bench Division. He retired in November 2013.

In February 2016 Henriques was asked by the Commissioner of the Metropolitan Police Sir Bernard Hogan-Howe to conduct an independent review of the Metropolitan Police Service's handling of non-recent sexual offence allegations against persons of public importance. His report, published in October 2016, made 25 recommendations on the future conduct of such investigations.
