= Lantern Project =

British charitable organisation

The Lantern Project is a UK registered charity which gave support to child sexual abuse victims, victims of bullying and victims of racial abuse. The Charity was founded by Graham Wilmer MBE, an adult survivor of childhood sexual abuse, in 2000 under the name 'Victims No Longer' but in 2003 it changed its name to the Lantern Project after gaining the support of another survivor David Williams.

== Operation 2000-2015 ==
Between 2000 and 2015 the charity developed its own therapeutic model which it rolled out in Wirral, Merseyside and the surrounding regions and offered care, information, and support to victims of child abuse in these areas, during this period it was funded by the NHS and third sector organisations in Wirral.

== Post 2015 Operation ==
In 2015 their funding was withdrawn by the NHS and their other 3rd sector backers. After 2015 they no longer offered counselling and now only respond to emails and send out reading material to support those who reach out to them.
