= Nottinghamshire sex abuse allegations =

Nottinghamshire sex abuse allegations are centred on claims made by children in care homes and foster care. Since 2010 Nottinghamshire Police have started three operations to study historic child abuse in Nottingham and Nottinghamshire, England. The Independent Inquiry into Child Sexual Abuse will look into any institutional failures to protect children in council care.

== History ==
In 2010, police began to receive allegations of historic sexual abuse in Nottinghamshire children's homes. One of the first reports was from Melanie Shaw who claimed that she had been subjected to sexual abuse at Beechwood children's home in Nottingham. Shaw claimed that she had been raped and physically and sexually abused. She also claimed that a member of staff had threatened to kill her and that he told her that he had already murdered two children and buried them in the grounds of Beechwood. No charges have been brought against the people identified by Shaw. A statement from the police reads: "Unfortunately, it was determined that the evidential test was not passed and, as such, no prosecutions brought. Our enquiries have also not identified any unaccounted-for people at Beechwood Children’s Home. Searches were carried out at Beechwood in February 2012".

Shaw is not the only complainant. Over 80 other people have made allegations of abuse and nearly half of them claim that they were abused at Beechwood. There have been some prosecutions. In 2016, a residential social worker was sentenced to 20 years imprisonment after being found guilty of 17 offences at Beechwood, which took place between 1981 and 1985. In 2017, a former residential worker at Beechwood was found guilty of two charges of indecent assault on a child and two charges of indecency with a child. These offences were committed in the late 1970s.

On 31 July 2019, the Independent Inquiry into Child Sexual Abuse published its report into historical abuse in Nottinghamshire. It concluded that there was widespread sexual abuse of children during the 1970s, 1980s and 1990s, and that Nottingham City Council, Nottinghamshire County Council, and Nottinghamshire Police had failed the victims.

== See also ==
- Beechwood children's home
- Amberdale children's home
- Independent Inquiry into Child Sexual Abuse
