= Spilling the Beans =

2007 book by Clarissa Dickson Wright

- Author: Clarissa Dickson Wright
- Language: English
- Genre: Biography
- Publication date: 2007

Spilling the Beans is an autobiography written by Clarissa Dickson Wright and first published in 2007.

Wright's autobiography tells the story of her troubled youth as the unexpected youngest child of an accomplished doctor and a conservative mother. It goes on to explain her plight at the hands of her alcoholic, violent father and the subsequent trauma at the death of her mother and the love of her life (named Clive), which all lead her to extreme alcoholism. Wright's story delves into her darkest thoughts and feelings and tells of love, loss, friendship, wealth, poverty and her eventual recovery from her addiction. Her love of food features heavily in this book and eventually explains how food saves her life due to her decision to make it her career. A large portion of the autobiography explains how she forms a long-term friendship and working partnership with Jennifer Paterson which leads to the famous cookery programme Two Fat Ladies. The autobiography concludes with the telling of the loss Wright felt when Paterson died of lung cancer and how her life is at present. The autobiography has been described as both "funny" and "heart-breaking".
