= Christopher Hodson (judge) =

New Zealand lawyer and judge

Christopher John Hodson KC is a New Zealand barrister and judge. He was Judge Advocate General of the New Zealand Armed Forces, and the Chief Judge of the Court Martial of New Zealand until 2015.

== Early life ==
Hodson was born in Masterton, where he grew up on his family's hill-country farm. He graduated from the Victoria University of Wellington in 1966 with a Bachelor of Laws degree.

== Career ==
Hodson was admitted to the bar in 1966, and from 1966 to 1982, was a partner in Major Gooding & Partners in Masterton.

In 1983, Hodson became a partner in Macalister Mazengarb Parkin & Rose in Wellington, before commencing practice as a barrister sole in 1991, where he specialised in medical and military law. He was appointed Queen's Counsel in 1998.

Between 2008 and 2015, Hodson was the Judge Advocate General of the New Zealand Armed Forces, and the Chief Judge of the Court Martial of New Zealand. He is also vice-president of the International Equestrian Federation.

Hodson served in the Territorial Force (reserve) of the New Zealand Army, retiring as a lieutenant colonel in 1992.

== Personal life ==
Hodson had three children with his first wife. In 1992, he married fellow judge and barrister Lowell Goddard, who has a daughter from her first marriage to Sir John Scott, 5th Baronet, in 1969.
