= Ashman baronets =

Extinct baronetcy in the Baronetage of the United Kingdom

There has been one Ashman baronetcy which was created for Sir Herbert Ashman on 23 November 1907 in the Baronetage of the United Kingdom.

The baronetcy became extinct on the death of the 2nd Baronet.

== Ashman of Thirlmere, Somerset (1907) ==
- Sir Herbert Ashman, 1st Baronet (1854–1914)
- Sir Frederick Herbert Ashman, 2nd Baronet (1875–1916). Baronetcy extinct on his death.

Baronetage of the United Kingdom
Preceded by Scott baronets	Ashman baronets of Thirlmere; 23 November 1907	Succeeded by Bilsland baronets
