= Clarissa Dickson Wright =

English television cook (1947–2014)

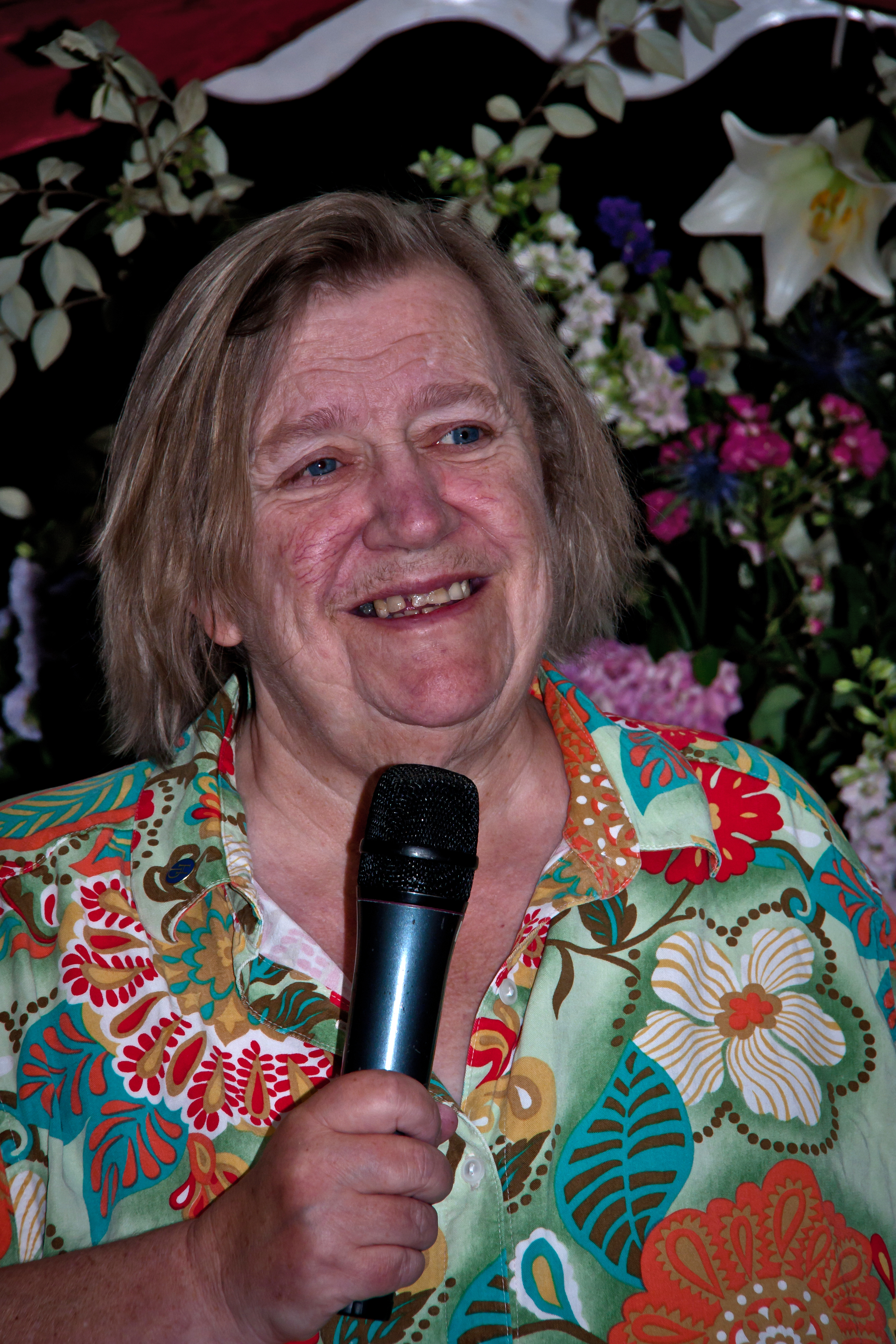
- Dickson Wright at a fundraising dinner for the Countryside Alliance in 2011

Lord Rector of the University of Aberdeen
- In office 1998–2004
- Preceded by: Allan Macartney
- Succeeded by: Robin Harper

Personal details
- Born: 24 June 1947 St John's Wood, London, England
- Died: 15 March 2014 (aged 66) Edinburgh, Scotland
- Education: University College London
- Occupation: Television personality; celebrity cook; actress; businesswoman; author; barrister

Clarissa Theresa Philomena Aileen Mary Josephine Agnes Elsie Trilby Louise Esmerelda Johnston Dickson Wright (24 June 1947 – 15 March 2014) was an English celebrity cook, television personality, writer, businesswoman, and barrister. She was best known as one of the Two Fat Ladies, with Jennifer Paterson, in the television cooking programme from 1996 to 1999.

== Early life ==
Dickson Wright was born in St John's Wood, London, the youngest of four children. Her father, Arthur Dickson Wright, was a surgeon to the Royal Family who had served with the Colonial Service at Singapore, and her mother, Aileen Mary (Molly) Bath, was from "a well known and respected Singapore family". She said her father was an alcoholic who subjected his wife and children to physical abuse.

At the age of 11, Dickson Wright was sent to the Convent of the Sacred Heart, an independent school for girls in the coastal town of Hove in Sussex, and then to the Convent of the Sacred Heart at Woldingham. After school, Wright read law at University College London. She undertook her pupillage (to become a barrister) at Gray's Inn.

== Career ==
=== Early career ===
Dickson Wright was called to the bar in 1970. She later claimed (although she turned 23 that year) that this occurred when she was aged 21, and that she was the youngest woman ever to be called to the bar. After her mother died of a heart attack in 1975, she inherited a considerable sum of money, which by her own account she squandered over the next eight years. Her mother's death – combined a year later with that of her father, who spent his final years aphasic and requiring the use of a wheelchair after a stroke – left her in a deep depression, and she drank heavily for the following 12 years.

In 1979, Dickson Wright took control of the food at a drinking club in St James's Place in London. While there she met a fellow alcoholic named Clive (whose surname she never revealed); they had a relationship until his death in 1982 from kidney failure due to his excessive drinking, at the age of 40. Shortly thereafter she was disbarred for practising without chambers. Dickson Wright said that, during her alcoholic years, she had sex with an MP behind the Speaker's chair in the House of Commons.

In the early 1980s, she was homeless and staying with friends. For two years she was cook-housekeeper for a family in Sussex until she was sacked for her alcohol-induced behaviour. She attended the Promis Recovery Centre at Nonington. In her 2009 book Rifling Through My Drawers she expressed a belief in reincarnation. She was a keen supporter of hunting.

=== Cooking and television ===
BBC2 commissioned a series of Two Fat Ladies featuring Dickson Wright and the food writer Jennifer Paterson. Four series were made and shown around the world. Paterson died in 1999 midway through the fourth series.

=== Later years ===
Two Fat Ladies ended in 1999 after Paterson's death. Dickson Wright appeared with Sir Johnny Scott in Clarissa and the Countryman from 2000 to 2003 and played the gamekeeper in the sitcom Absolutely Fabulous in 2003. In 2004 she closed her Edinburgh cookery book shop due to bankruptcy and lost the contract to run a tearoom at Lennoxlove House, the seat of the Duke of Hamilton and Brandon. In 2005, Dickson Wright took part in the BBC reality television show Art School.

Dickson Wright was elected as Rector of the University of Aberdeen in November 1998, the university's first female rector. Her autobiography, Spilling the Beans, was published in September 2007. In 2008, she presented a one-off documentary for BBC Four, Clarissa and the King's Cookbook, where she makes recipes from a cookbook dating to the reign of Richard II.

Along with racehorse trainer Sir Mark Prescott, Dickson Wright was charged with hare coursing with dogs in North Yorkshire in March 2007 under a private prosecution lodged by the International Fund for Animal Welfare under the Hunting Act 2004. On 1 September 2009, she and Prescott pleaded guilty and received an absolute discharge at Scarborough Magistrates' Court. They said that they were invited to the event by the Yorkshire Greyhound Field Trialling Club, which told the court that it believed it was running a legal event by using muzzled dogs.

In October 2012, Dickson Wright appeared on Fieldsports Britain to discuss badgers and their nutritional value, saying: "There's going to be a cull, so rather than just throw them in the landfill site, why not eat them?" In November 2012, she presented a short BBC4 TV series on the history of the British breakfast, lunch and dinner. She was a supporter of the Conservative Party and lived in Inveresk, Scotland.

In her later years, Wright was known for her criticism and opposition to anti-hunting groups and vegetarianism. She supported hare coursing and a diet of red meat, butter and cream.

== Death ==
Dickson Wright died in the Edinburgh Royal Infirmary on 15 March 2014, aged 66, from pneumonia relating to an undisclosed illness.

Her Funeral Mass was held in Edinburgh at St Mary's Cathedral on 7 April, after which she was cremated.

== Books ==
Cookery books:

- The Haggis: A Short History (Appletree Press Ltd, 3 May 1996).
- Two Fat Ladies: Gastronomic Adventures with Jennifer Paterson (Ebury Publishing, 3 October 1996) (Entitled Cooking with the Two Fat Ladies in the USA).
- The Two Fat Ladies Ride Again, with Jennifer Paterson (Ebury Publishing, 4 September 1997).
- The Two Fat Ladies Full Throttle, with Jennifer Paterson (Ebury Publishing, 27 August 1998).
- Hieland Foodie: A Scottish Culinary Voyage with Clarissa, with Henry Crichton-Stuart (Natl Museums of Scotland, 1 August 1999).
- Living Large: A Life in Recipes (Scotland on Sunday, 1999) (48 pages).
- Two Fat Ladies – Obsessions, with Jennifer Paterson (Ebury Publishing, 7 September 1999).
- The Very Best of Two Fat Ladies: Over 150 Favourite Recipes from Their Best Selling Books (Ebury Publishing, 2000).
- Sunday Roast: The Complete Guide to Cooking and Carving, with Sir John Scott, 5th Baronet (Headline Publishing Group, 7 October 2002).
- The Game Cookbook, with Sir John Scott, 5th Baronet (Kyle Cathie, 12 August 2004).
- Pre-Victorian English Cookery (Macmillan Trade Paperback, 5 March 2004).
- Clarissa's Comfort Food (Kyle Cathie, 4 September 2008).
- Potty! Clarissa's One Pot Cookbook (Hodder & Stoughton, 16 September 2010).
- The Great British Food Revival, various authors (W&N, 3 March 2011).
- The Great British Food Revival: The Revolution Continues, various authors (W&N, 10 November 2011).

Memoirs:

- Spilling the Beans (Hodder & Stoughton, 6 September 2007).
- Rifling Through My Drawers: My Life in a Year (Hodder & Stoughton, 17 September 2009).
- Ancestors and Rellies (Hodder & Stoughton, 2015). (Appears to have been withdrawn from release)

Miscellaneous:

- Food: What We Eat and How We Eat (Ebury Publishing, 7 October 1999).
- Clarissa and the Countryman, with Sir John Scott, 5th Baronet (Headline Publishing Group, 19 October 2000).
- Clarissa and the Countryman: Sally Forth, with Sir John Scott, 5th Baronet (Headline Publishing Group, 17 December 2001).
- A Greener Life: The Modern Country Compendium, with Sir John Scott, 5th Baronet (F&W Media International (previously David & Charles), 31 October 2005).
- A History of English Food (Random House, 13 October 2011).
- Clarissa's England (Hodder & Stoughton, 13 September 2012).

== Audio books ==
- Box of Beans Book (Spilling the Beans) and 2 CDs (Hodder & Stoughton, 2007).
- Spilling the Beans (Hodder & Stoughton, 2007).
- Rifling Through My Drawers (Hodder & Stoughton, 2009).
- A History of English Food (Random House, 2012).
- Clarissa's England: A Gamely Gallop Through the English Counties (Hodder & Stoughton, 2013).

== Forewords written ==
- The Essential Cook (Countryside Alliance, 2000).
- Kick The Habit Paperback by Robert Lefever (Carlton Publishing Group, 2000).
- A Caledonian Feast by Annette Hope (Canongate Books, 2002).
- A Book of Mediterranean Food by Elizabeth David (New York Review of Books, 2002).
- William Evans Good Shoot Guide by Tony Jackson (Gibson Square Books, 2003).
- Garlic, The Mighty Bulb (aka The Goodness of Garlic) by Natasha Edwards (Kyle Cathie, 2012).

== Television ==
SERIES:

- Two Fat Ladies (1996–1999, 24 episodes), with Jennifer Paterson
- Clarissa and The Countryman (2000–2003, 24 episodes), with Johnny Scott
- Art School (October–November 2005, 6 episodes)
- The Great British Food Revival (3 episodes: 5 February 2011, 8 January 2012, 22 January 2013)
- Breakfast, Lunch and Dinner (3 episodes: 9 November, 19 November & 26 November 2012)

GUEST APPEARANCES:

- Grow Your Greens, Eat Your Greens (1993, 1 episode)
- In the National Trust - Chinese Silk Wallpaper (1 February 1995)
- The End of the Year Show (31 December 1996) (with Jennifer Paterson)
- All Over The Shop (8 January 1997) (with Jennifer Paterson)
- Songs of Praise: Food Praise (9 February 1997: Bournville) (with Jennifer Paterson)
- Comedy Zone (27 February 1997) (with Jennifer Paterson)
- Edinburgh Nights (18 August 1997)
- The Rosie O'Donnell Show (23 September 1997) (with Jennifer Paterson)
- The Tonight Show with Jay Leno (24 September 1997) (with Jennifer Paterson)
- Clive Anderson All Talk (September 1997) (with Jennifer Paterson)
- The End of the Year Show (31 December 1997) (with Jennifer Paterson)
- Live! with Regis and Kathie Lee (18 February 1998) (with Jennifer Paterson)
- Good Morning America (20 February 1998) (with Jennifer Paterson)
- In the Kitchen With Bob (21 February 1998) (with Jennifer Paterson) (QVC on The Shopping Network)
- Edinburgh Nights (28 August 1998)
- Organic Food Awards (28 October 1998) (with Jennifer Paterson)
- Question Time (1998–2003, 4 episodes)
- Entertainment Tonight (December 1998) (with Jennifer Paterson)
- Sophie Grigson's Herbs (3 March 1999)
- Royal Television Society Awards (29 March 1999) (with Jennifer Paterson)
- Have I Got News for You (7 May 1999)
- Mark Lamarr Leaving the 20th Century (8 August 1999)
- Sophie Grigson's Herbs (17 August 1999)
- Loose Women (1999–2012, 4 episodes)
- Songs of Praise (12 December 1999: Advent 3: Christmas is Coming)
- Parkinson (28 January 2000)
- Pass It On (20 March & 27 March 2000)
- Celebrity Rehab (19 July 2000)
- Live Talk (7 November 2000) (with Johnny Scott)
- Ruby (8 November 2000) (with Johnny Scott)
- Friends for Dinner - Friends for Christmas Dinner (20 December 2000)
- Breakfast with Frost (27 May 2001) (with Johnny Scott)
- Holiday (29 October 2001)
- Fifty Places to See Before You Die (10 November 2002)
- Saturday Kitchen Live (31 May 2003)
- Absolutely Fabulous (Episode: Huntin', Shootin' & Fishin) (7 November 2003)
- Today with Des and Mel (11 December 2003)
- The Nation's Favourite Christmas Food (18 December 2003)
- One Man and His Dog (29 December 2003)
- Today with Des and Mel (14 January 2004)
- Britain's Best Sitcom (Open All Hours 6 March 2004, Live Final 27 March 2004)
- Happy Birthday BBC Two (20 April 2004)
- The Wright Stuff (2004–2011, 4 episodes)
- GMTV (16 September 2004)
- Countdown (5 episodes from 16 to 21 February 2006)
- Hannah Glasse: The First Domestic Goddess (30 June 2006)
- Test the Nation: The National IQ Test 2006 (2 September 2006)
- Friends For Dinner: Christmas Dinner (30 December 2006)
- Balderdash & Piffle (2006–2007, 2 episodes)
- The New Paul O'Grady Show (29 November 2007)
- Clarissa and the King's Cookbook (7 May 2008)
- The One Show (2008–2010, 2 episodes)
- The Alan Titchmarsh Show (28 September 2009)
- The Big Food Fight (29 September 2009)
- Victoria Wood: Seen on TV (21 December 2009)
- Mr Pepys's Diary (11 January 2010)
- Newsnight at 30 (23 January 2010)
- The Michael Ball Show (13 September 2010)
- Fern Britton Meets Clarissa Dickson Wright (5 December 2010)
- Welly Telly: The Countryside on Television (29 May 2011)
- Meet The Author: Festive cooks (21 December 2011)
- Roundhead or Cavalier: Which One Are You? (15 May 2012)
- Fieldsports Britain (October 2012)
- The One Show (29 November 2012)
- Victoria Wood's Nice Cup of Tea (2 episodes 10 & 11 April 2013)
- The Mind of the Maker Clarissa Dickson Wright speaks at St Paul's Cathedral (30 April 2013)
- Celebrity Eggheads (13 December 2013)
- How to Get Ahead at Medieval Court (11 March 2014) (Final appearance)

== Awards ==
2008 BA/Nielsen BookData Author of the Year Award.

== DVD release ==
The Two Fat Ladies DVD set contains a 40-minute BBC tribute to Paterson that aired in 2004. The DVD box set was released in the United States of America in July 2008. The Acorn Media release contains all 24 episodes across four discs. The show had been released in Britain as a Region 2 DVD set.

== Reception ==
Her A History of English Food was described by The Independent as "richly informative" and "surely destined for classic status". The reviewer noted that she had seen badger hams on the bar in the West Country pubs of her childhood, and that a tripe seller in Dewsbury market sold "nine different varieties of tripe, including penis and udder (which is remarkably like pease pudding)."

Academic offices
Preceded by Allan Macartney	Rector of the University of Aberdeen; 1998–2004	Succeeded by Robin Harper
