= Lowell Goddard =

New Zealand High Court judge

The Honourable Dame Lowell Goddard DNZM KC
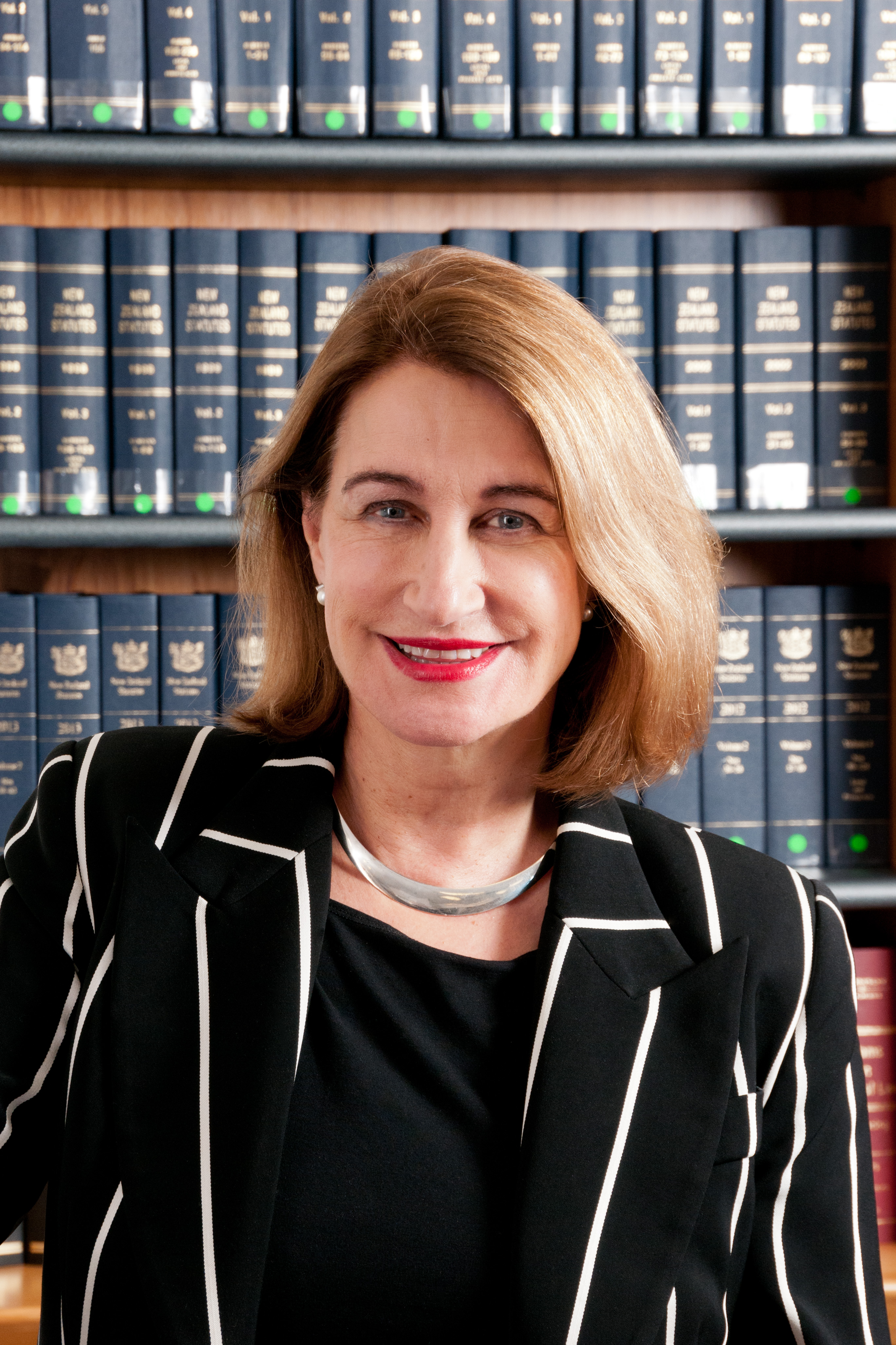

Justice of the High Court of New Zealand
- Incumbent
- Assumed office December 1995

Chair of the Independent Inquiry into Child Sexual Abuse
- In office 4 February 2015 – 4 August 2016
- Appointed by: Theresa May (as Home Secretary)
- Preceded by: Fiona Woolf
- Succeeded by: Alexis Jay

Chair of Independent Police Conduct Authority, New Zealand
- In office 2007–2012
- Preceded by: Ian Borrin
- Succeeded by: Sir David Carruthers

Personal details
- Born: Lowell Patria Goddard; 25 November 1948 (age 77) Auckland, New Zealand
- Spouse(s): Sir John Scott, 5th Baronet (m. 1969; div. 1971) Christopher Hodson (m. 1992)
- Children: 1

Dame Lowell Patria Goddard, DNZM, KC (born 25 November 1948) is a former New Zealand High Court judge, from 1995 to 2015. She is thought to be the first person of Māori ancestry to have been appointed to the High Court. In 1988, she was one of the first two women to be appointed Queen's Counsel in New Zealand and in 1989 became the first woman to hold a Crown warrant. In 1992, she became Deputy Solicitor-General for New Zealand. Between 2007 and 2012 she chaired New Zealand's Independent Police Conduct Authority (IPCA). In 2010 she was elected as an independent expert to the United Nations Subcommittee on the Prevention of Torture (SPT) and served in that capacity until 2016. From February 2015 until August 2016, she chaired the Independent Inquiry into Child Sexual Abuse in England and Wales.

== Early life ==
Lowell Goddard was born in Auckland, New Zealand. Goddard is Māori, and affiliates to Ngāti Kahungunu, Te Aitanga-a-Māhaki and Ngāi Tūhoe. Her father was Squadron Leader Pat Vaughan Goddard. She was educated at Diocesan School for Girls, Auckland, and then studied law at the University of Auckland, graduating in 1974.

== Career ==
Goddard was admitted to the bar in 1975, and started to practise as a barrister in 1977. Her work included a period as a member of the committee which helped establish a facility for victims of sexual abuse, which assisted police to establish a better approach to the examination and interviewing of victims. She also took part in a youth advocacy pilot for children and young people, and was a member of a panel on New Zealand's policy regarding children in care.

In 1988, she and Sian Elias were the two first women to be appointed Queen's Counsel in New Zealand. She was Crown Counsel and Head of the Criminal Law Team at the Crown Law Office in Wellington from 1989 to 1995, and served as Deputy Solicitor-General of New Zealand from 1992 to 1995.

In 1990, she was awarded the New Zealand 1990 Commemoration Medal, and in 1993 she received the New Zealand Suffrage Centennial Medal.

She became a High Court judge in December 1995, based in Wellington, and is believed to be the first person of Māori descent to have served as a High Court judge. She also sat as a member of the Criminal Division of the New Zealand Court of Appeal.

She was the first woman to serve as chair of New Zealand's Independent Police Conduct Authority, from 2007 to 2012. In that capacity she also served as an expert to the United Nations Subcommittee on Prevention of Torture from 2010 to 2016. She was appointed a Dame Companion of the New Zealand Order of Merit in the 2014 Queen's Birthday Honours, for services to the law.

In February 2015, she was appointed to head the statutory public inquiry to replace the Independent Panel Inquiry into Child Sexual Abuse in England and Wales. The British Home Secretary, Theresa May, described her as highly respected and an outstanding candidate with experience in challenging authority in this field. Goddard said she was honoured to lead the inquiry and was aware of the scale of the undertaking, saying that "the many, many survivors of child sexual abuse, committed over decades, deserve a robust and thorough investigation of the appalling crimes perpetrated upon them."

In August 2016, she tendered her resignation from the child abuse inquiry in a letter to the Home Secretary Amber Rudd. Shortly after she wrote a report to the Home Secretary outlining her concerns on issues faced by the Inquiry. Claims of racism and bullying made in British newspapers, more than two months after her resignation, were "strenuously denied" by her. In November 2016, Goddard announced that she would not be appearing in person before the Home Affairs Select Committee, citing legal advice; her decision was criticised by the committee's chairwoman, Yvette Cooper.

== Personal life ==
Goddard married John Scott (later Sir John Scott, 5th Baronet), a British journalist, in 1969. They had one daughter, born in 1970, before they divorced.

She married Christopher Hodson in 1992. He served in the Territorial Force (reserve) of the New Zealand Army, retiring as a lieutenant colonel in 1992. He is Judge Advocate General of the New Zealand Armed Forces, and the Chief Judge of the Court Martial of New Zealand, and also vice-president of the International Equestrian Federation.
