= Gentleman =

Title of address for a noble man

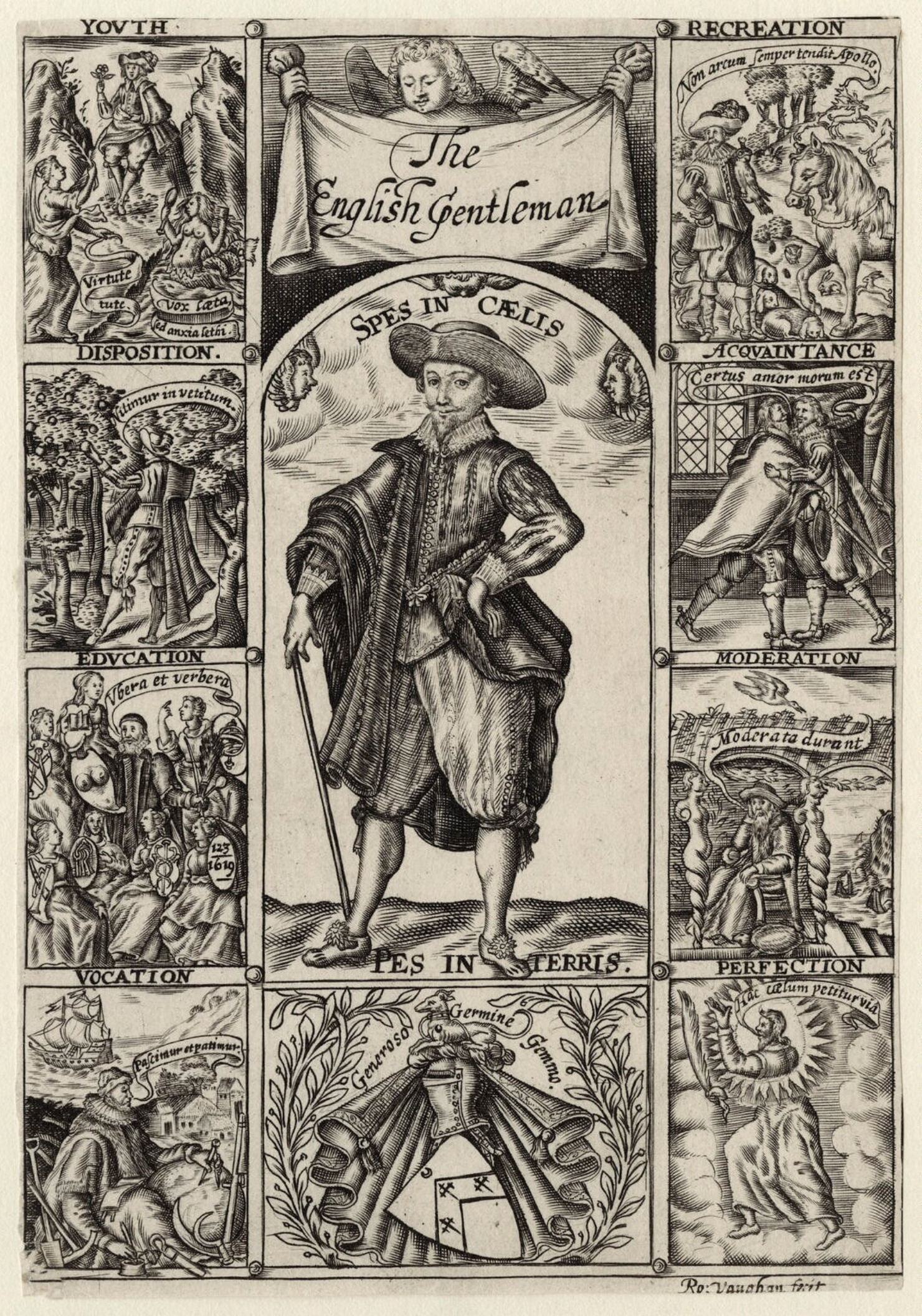
The Complete English Gentleman (1630), by Richard Brathwait, shows the exemplary qualities of a gentleman.

A gentleman (Old French: gentilz hom, "gentle man"; colloquial: gent) is a chivalrous, courteous, or honourable man. Originally, gentleman was the lowest rank of the landed gentry of England, ranking below an esquire and above a yeoman; by definition, the rank of gentleman comprised the younger sons of the younger sons of peers, and the younger sons of a baronet, a knight, and an esquire, in perpetual succession. As such, the connotation of the term gentleman captures the common denominator of gentility (and often a coat of arms); a right shared by the peerage and the gentry, the constituent classes of the British nobility.

Thus, the English social category of gentleman corresponds to the French gentilhomme (nobleman), which in Great Britain meant a member of the peerage of England. English historian Maurice Keen further clarifies this point, stating that, in this context, the social category of gentleman is "the nearest contemporary English equivalent of the noblesse of France." In the 14th century, the term gentlemen comprised the hereditary ruling class, which is whom the rebels of the Peasants' Revolt (1381) meant when they repeated:

When Adam delved and Eve span,
Who was then the gentleman?

In the 17th century, in Titles of Honour (1614), the jurist John Selden said that the title gentleman likewise speaks of "our English use of it" as convertible with nobilis (nobility by rank or personal quality) and describes the forms of a man's elevation to the nobility in European monarchies. In the 19th century, James Henry Lawrence explained and discussed the concepts, particulars, and functions of social rank in a monarchy, in the book On the Nobility of the British Gentry, or the Political Ranks and Dignities of the British Empire, Compared with those on the Continent (1827).

== Gentleman by conduct ==
The coat of arms of William Shakespeare.

In The Tale of Melibee (c. 1386), Geoffrey Chaucer says: "Certes he sholde not be called a gentil man, that . . . ne dooth his diligence and bisynesse, to kepen his good name"; and in The Wife of Bath's Tale (1388–1396):

Loke who that is most vertuous alway
Prive and apert, and most entendeth ay
To do the gentil dedes that he can
And take him for the gretest gentilman

In the French allegorical poem The Romance of the Rose (ca. 1400), Guillaume de Lorris and Jean de Meun described the innate character of a gentleman: "He is gentil bycause he doth as longeth to a gentilman." That definition develops until the 18th century, when in 1710, in the Tatler No. 207, Richard Steele said that "the appellation of Gentleman is never to be affixed to a man's circumstances, but to his Behaviour in them." Hence, the apocryphal reply of King James II of England to a lady's petition to elevate her son to the rank of gentleman: "I could make him a nobleman, but God Almighty could not make him a gentleman."

Selden said "that no Charter can make a Gentleman, which is cited as out of the mouth of some great Princes [who] have said it," because "they, without question, understood Gentleman for Generosus in the antient sense, or as if it came from Genii/[Geni] in that sense." The word gentilis identifies a man of noble family, a gentleman by birth, for "no creation could make a man of another blood than he is." In contemporary usage, the word gentleman is ambiguously defined, because "to behave like a gentleman" communicates as little praise or as much criticism as the speaker means to imply; thus, "to spend money like a gentleman" is criticism, but "to conduct a business like a gentleman" is praise.

=== William Harrison ===
In the 16th century, the clergyman William Harrison said that "gentlemen be those whom their race and blood, or at the least their virtues, do make noble and known." In that time, a gentleman usually was expected to have a coat of arms, it being accepted that only a gentleman could have a coat of arms, as indicated in an account of how gentlemen were made in the day of William Shakespeare:

Gentlemen whose ancestors are not known to come in with William duke of Normandy (for of the Saxon races yet remaining we now make none accompt, much less of the British issue) do take their beginning in England after this manner in our times. Who soever studieth the laws of the realm, who so abideth in the university, giving his mind to his book, or professeth physic and the liberal sciences, or beside his service in the room of a captain in the wars, or good counsel given at home, whereby his commonwealth is benefited, can live without manual labour, and thereto is able and will bear the port, charge and countenance of a gentleman, he shall for money have a coat and arms bestowed upon him by heralds (who in the charter of the same do of custom pretend antiquity and service) and thereunto being made so good cheap be called master, which is the title that men give to esquires and gentlemen, and reputed for a gentleman ever after. Which is so much the less to be disallowed of, for that the prince doth lose nothing by it, the gentleman being so much subject to taxes and public payments as is the yeoman or husbandman, which he likewise doth bear the gladlier for the saving of his reputation. Being called also to the wars (for with the government of the commonwealth he medleth little) what soever it cost him, he will both array and arm himself accordingly, and show the more manly courage, and all the tokens of the person which he representeth. No man hath hurt by it but himself, who peradventure will go in wider buskins than his legs will bear, or as our proverb saith, now and then bear a bigger sail than his boat is able to sustain.

=== William Shakespeare ===
In this way, William Shakespeare himself was demonstrated, by the grant of his coat of arms, to be no "vagabond", but a gentleman. The inseparability of arms and gentility is shown by two of his characters:

Petruchio: I swear I'll cuff you if you strike again.
Katharine: So may you lose your arms: If you strike me, you are no gentleman;
And if no gentleman, why then no arms.
—The Taming of the Shrew, Act II, Scene i

However, although only a gentleman could have a coat of arms (so that possession of a coat of arms was proof of gentility), the coat of arms recognised, rather than created, the status (see George Drewry Squibb, The High Court of Chivalry, pp. 170–177). Thus, all armigers were gentlemen, but not all gentlemen were armigers. Hence, Henry V, act IV, scene iii:

For he today that sheds his blood with me
Shall be my brother: be he ne'er so vile,
This day shall gentle his condition.
And gentlemen in England now abed
Shall think themselves accurs'd they were not here
And hold their manhoods cheap whilst any speaks
That fought with us upon St. Crispin's Day.

=== Superiority of the fighting man ===
The fundamental idea of "gentry", symbolised in this grant of coat-armour, had come to be that of the essential superiority of the fighting man, and, as Selden points out (page 707), the fiction was usually maintained in the granting of arms "to an ennobled person though of the long Robe wherein he hath little use of them as they mean a shield." At the last, the wearing of a sword on all occasions was the outward and visible sign of a gentleman; the custom survives in the sword worn with court dress.

A suggestion that a gentleman must have a coat of arms was vigorously advanced by certain 19th and 20th century heraldists, notably Arthur Charles Fox-Davies in England and Thomas Innes of Learney in Scotland. The suggestion is discredited by an examination, in England, of the records of the High Court of Chivalry and, in Scotland, by a judgment of the Court of Session (per Lord Mackay in Maclean of Ardgour v. Maclean [1941] SC 613 at 650). The significance of a right to a coat of arms was that it was definitive proof of the status of gentleman, but it recognised rather than conferred such a status, and the status could be and frequently was accepted without a right to a coat of arms.

=== Confucianism ===
In East Asia, the characteristics of a gentleman are based upon the principles of Confucianism, wherein the term Jūnzǐ (君子) denotes and identifies the "son of a ruler", a "prince", a "noble man"; and the ideals that conceptually define "gentleman", "proper man", and a "perfect man". Conceptually, Jūnzǐ included an hereditary elitism, which obliged the gentleman to act ethically, to:

- morally cultivate himself;
- participate in the correct performance of ritual;
- show filial piety and loyalty to whom due; and
- cultivate humanity.

The opposite of the Jūnzǐ is the Xiǎorén (小人), "petty person" and "small person". As in English, in the Chinese usage the word small, can denote and connote a person who is "mean", "petty in mind and heart", and "narrowly self-interested", greedy, materialistic, and personally superficial.

=== Southern United States ===
The Southern gentleman of the Antebellum South was expected to protect the honour and property of both himself and his family members, acting as a chivalric ideal of the white planter class supposedly descended from the knights and cavaliers of the medieval and colonial eras.

Robert E. Lee's definition speaks only to conduct.

The forbearing use of power does not only form a touchstone, but the manner in which an individual enjoys certain advantages over others is a test of a true gentleman.

The power which the strong have over the weak, the employer over the employed, the educated over the unlettered, the experienced over the confiding, even the clever over the silly—the forbearing or inoffensive use of all this power or authority, or a total abstinence from it when the case admits it, will show the gentleman in a plain light.

The gentleman does not needlessly and unnecessarily remind an offender of a wrong he may have committed against him. He can not only forgive, he can forget; and he strives for that nobleness of self and mildness of character which impart sufficient strength to let the past be but the past. A true man of honor feels humbled himself when he cannot help humbling others. As quoted by Bradford 1912, p. 233

Lee's conception is one of the better known expositions in favour of the Southern culture of honour.

== Landed gentry ==
That a distinct order of landed gentry existed in England very early has, indeed, been often assumed and is supported by weighty authorities. Thus, the late Professor Freeman (in Encyclopædia Britannica xvii. page 540 b, 9th edition) said: "Early in the 11th century the order of 'gentlemen' as a separate class seems to be forming as something new. By the time of the conquest of England the distinction seems to have been fully established." Stubbs (Const. Hist., ed. 1878, iii. 544, 548) takes the same view. Sir George Sitwell, however, has suggested that this opinion is based on a wrong conception of the conditions of medieval society and that it is wholly opposed to the documentary evidence.

The most basic class distinctions in the Middle Ages were between the nobiles, i.e., the tenants in chivalry, such as earls, barons, knights, esquires, the free ignobiles such as the citizens and burgesses, and franklins, and the unfree peasantry including villeins and serfs. Even as late as 1400, the word gentleman still only had the descriptive sense of generosus and could not be used as denoting the title of a class. Yet after 1413, we find it increasingly so used, and the list of landowners in 1431, printed in Feudal Aids, contains, besides knights, esquires, yeomen and husbandmen (i.e. householders), a fair number who are classed as "gentilman".

=== George Sitwell ===
Sir George Sitwell gave a lucid, instructive and occasionally amusing explanation of this development. The immediate cause was the statute 1 Hen. 5. c. 5. of 1413, which laid down that in all original writs of action, personal appeals and indictments, in which process of outlawry lies, the "estate degree or mystery" of the defendant must be stated, as well as his present or former domicile. At this time, the Black Death (1349) had put the traditional social organization out of gear. Before that, the younger sons of the nobles had received their share of the farm stock, bought or hired land, and settled down as agriculturists in their native villages. Under the new conditions, this became increasingly impossible, and they were forced to seek their fortunes abroad in the French wars, or at home as hangers-on of the great nobles. These men, under the old system, had no definite status; but they were generosi, men of birth, and, being now forced to describe themselves, they disdained to be classed with franklins (now sinking in the social scale), still more with yeomen or husbandmen; they chose, therefore, to be described as "gentlemen".

On the character of these earliest gentlemen the records throw a lurid light. Sir George Sitwell (p. 76), describes a man typical of his class, one who had served among the men-at-arms of Lord John Talbot at the Battle of Agincourt:

the premier gentleman of England, as the matter now stands, is "Robert Ercleswyke of Stafford, gentilman"... Fortunately—for the gentle reader will no doubt be anxious to follow in his footsteps—some particulars of his life may be gleaned from the public records. He was charged at the Staffordshire Assizes with housebreaking, wounding with intent to kill, and procuring the murder of one Thomas Page, who was cut to pieces while on his knees begging for his life.

If any earlier claimant to the title of gentleman be discovered, Sir George Sitwell predicted that it will be within the same year (1414) and in connection with some similar disreputable proceedings.

From these unpromising beginnings, the separate order of gentlemen evolved very slowly. The first gentleman commemorated on an existing monument was John Daundelyon of Margate (died circa 1445); the first gentleman to enter the House of Commons, hitherto composed mainly of "valets", was William Weston, "gentylman"; but even in the latter half of the 15th century, the order was not clearly established. As to the connection of gentilesse with the official grant or recognition of coat-armour, that is a profitable fiction invented and upheld by the heralds; for coat-armour was the badge assumed by gentlemen to distinguish them in battle, and many gentlemen of long descent never had occasion to assume it and never did.

==== Further decline of standards ====
This fiction, however, had its effect, and by the 16th century, as has been already pointed out, the official view had become clearly established that gentlemen constituted a distinct social order and that the badge of this distinction was the heralds' recognition of the right to bear arms. However, some undoubtedly "gentle" families of long descent never obtained official rights to bear a coat of arms, the family of Strickland being an example, which caused some consternation when Lord Strickland applied to join the Order of Malta in 1926 and could prove no right to a coat of arms, although his direct male ancestor had carried the English royal banner of St. George at the Battle of Agincourt.

The younger sons of noble families became apprentices in the cities, and there grew up a new aristocracy of trade. Merchants are still "citizens" to William Harrison; but he adds "they often change estate with gentlemen, as gentlemen do with them, by a mutual conversion of the one into the other."

=== A line between classes ===
A frontier line between classes so indefinite could not be maintained in some societies such as England, where there was never a "nobiliary prefix" to stamp a person as a gentleman, as opposed to France or Germany. The process was hastened, moreover, by the corruption of the Heralds' College and by the ease with which coats of arms could be assumed without a shadow of claim, which tended to bring the science of heraldry into contempt.

The prefix "de" attached to some English names is in no sense "nobiliary". In Latin documents de was the equivalent of the English "of", as de la for "at" (so de la Pole for "Atte Poole"; compare such names as "Attwood" or "Attwater"). In English this "of" disappeared during the 15th century: for example the grandson of Johannes de Stoke (John of Stoke) in a 14th-century document becomes "John Stoke". In modern times, under the influence of romanticism, the prefix "de" has been in some cases "revived" under a misconception, e.g. "de Trafford", "de Hoghton". Very rarely it is correctly retained as derived from a foreign place-name, e.g. "de Grey". The situation varies somewhat in Scotland, where the territorial designation still exists and its use is regulated by law.

With the growth of trade and the Industrial Revolution from 1700 to 1900, the term widened to include men of the urban professional classes: lawyers, doctors and even merchants. By 1841, the rules of the new gentlemen's club at Ootacamund was to include: "...gentlemen of the Mercantile or other professions, moving in the ordinary circle of Indian society".

== Formal court titles ==
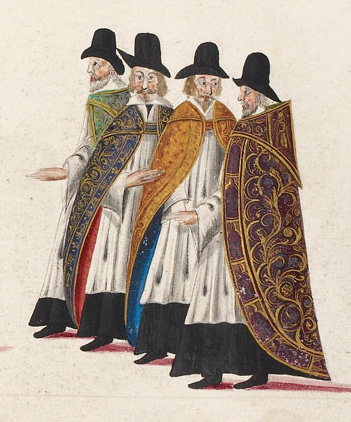
Gentlemen of the Chapel Royal at the funeral procession of Elizabeth I of England.

At several monarchs' courts, various functions bear titles containing such rank designations as gentleman (suggesting it is to be filled by a member of the lower nobility, or a commoner who will be ennobled, while the highest posts are often reserved for the higher nobility). In English, the terms for the English/Scottish/British court (equivalents may include Lady for women, Page for young men) include:

- Gentleman at Arms
- Gentleman-in-waiting
- Gentleman of the bedchamber
- Gentleman of the Chapel Royal
- Gentleman-usher

In France, gentilhomme

- ... rendered as "gentleman-in-ordinary"
- ... as gentleman of the bed-chamber

In Spain, e.g., Gentilhombre de la casa del príncipe, "gentleman of the house[hold] of the prince"

Such positions can occur in the household of a non-member of a ruling family, such as a prince of the church:

- Gentiluomo of the Archbishop of Westminster

== Modern usage ==
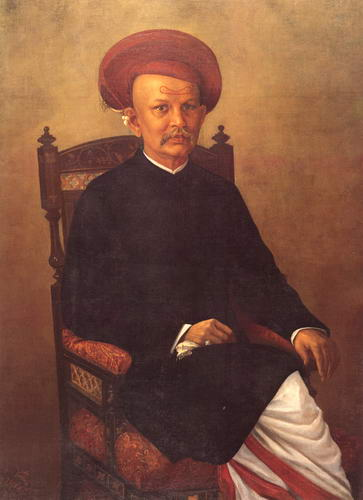
Raja Ravi Varma, Painting of a Gentleman; India, 19th century.

The word gentleman as an index of rank had already become of doubtful value before the great political and social changes of the 19th century gave to it a wider and essentially higher significance. The change is well illustrated in the definitions given in the successive editions of the Encyclopædia Britannica. In the 5th edition (1815), "a gentleman is one, who without any title, bears a coat of arms, or whose ancestors have been freemen." In the 7th edition (1845) it still implies a definite social status: "All above the rank of yeomen." In the 8th edition (1856), this is still its "most extended sense"; "in a more limited sense" it is defined in the same words as those quoted above from the 5th edition; but the writer adds, "By courtesy this title is generally accorded to all persons above the rank of common tradesmen when their manners are indicative of a certain amount of refinement and intelligence."

The Reform Act 1832 did its work; the middle classes came into their own, and the word gentleman came in common use to signify not a distinction of blood, but a distinction of position, education and manners. By this usage, the test is no longer good birth or the right to bear arms, but the capacity to mingle on equal terms in good society.

In its best use, moreover, gentleman involves a certain superior standard of conduct, due, to quote the 8th edition once more, to "that self-respect and intellectual refinement which manifest themselves in unrestrained yet delicate manners." The word gentle, originally implying a certain social status, had very early come to be associated with the standard of manners expected from that status. Thus, by a sort of punning process, the "gentleman" becomes a "gentle-man".

In another sense, being a gentleman means treating others, especially women, in a respectful manner and not taking advantage or pushing others into doing things they do not wish to do. The exception, of course, is to push someone into something they need to do for their own good, such as a visit to the hospital, or pursuing a dream they have suppressed.

In some cases, its meaning becomes twisted through misguided efforts to avoid offending anyone; a news report of a riot may refer to a "gentleman" trying to smash a window with a dustbin in order to loot a store. Similar use (notably between quotation marks or in an appropriate tone) may also be deliberate irony.

Another relatively recent usage of gentleman is as a prefix to another term to imply that a man has sufficient wealth and free time to pursue an area of interest without depending on it for his livelihood. Examples include gentleman scientist, gentleman farmer, gentleman architect, and gentleman pirate. A very specific incarnation and possible origin of this practise existed until 1962 in cricket, where a man playing the game was a "gentleman cricketer" if he did not get a salary for taking part in the game. By tradition, such gentlemen were from the British gentry or aristocracy - as opposed to players, who were not. In the same way in horse racing a gentleman rider is an amateur jockey, racing horses in specific flat and hurdle races.

The term gentleman is used in the United States' Uniform Code of Military Justice in a provision referring to "conduct befitting an officer and a gentleman."

The use of the term gentleman is a central concept in many books of American Literature: Adrift in New York, by Horatio Alger; "Fraternity: A Romance of Inspiration, by Anonymous, with a tipped in Letter from J.P. Morgan (1836); Gone with the Wind, by Margaret Mitchell (1936). It relates to education and manners, a certain code of conduct regarding women that has been incorporated in the U.S. into various civil rights laws and anti-sexual-harassment laws that define a code of conduct to be followed by law in the workplace. Scarlett O'Hara in Gone with the Wind states "You're no gentleman" on occasions when a lack of manners and respect toward her causes her to feel insulted.

"Ladies and gentlemen" is a common salutation used in formal speeches and other public addresses, sometimes followed by "boys and girls".

=== Gentlemen as members of the nobility ===
In its original, nobiliary sense, the term "Gentleman" is still used by the Commission and Association for the Armigerous Families of Great Britain, Britain's CILANE member association, as well as those orders of chivalry that require nobility for admission to their higher grades. Gentlemen in this sense form the lowest rank of the British historical nobility. It is the only social rank in Britain that is transmissible to all (male-line) descendants, not just by primogeniture. The class of Gentlemen under this definition usually consists of Gentlemen Armigers, i.e. all those who are entitled to armorial bearings, through grant or inheritance. As arms are still granted by the College of Arms and Lord Lyon, the British gentry remains open to new families unlike its Continental equivalents, which are usually not renewed by new ennoblements anymore either because the monarchy that would have the right to do so has been abolished or because the government has adopted a policy of treating the nobility as a closed and purely historical class.

Gentlemen possess gentility, that is, the condition corresponding to untitled nobility on the Continent. A grant of arms, at least in the English sense, does not confer gentility but rather confirms that it has been earned or demonstrated by the recipient. The evalutation of eligibility for a grant is, in fact, a test of gentility. Practically, this means that a grant of arms will consolidate gentility which has been acquired under one of the above definitions and turn it into a hereditary quality that is henceforth demonstrated by the grantee's descendants by proving the right to inherited arms (or, in Scotland, to matriculate a differenced version of his arms).

Gentility is also automatically accorded with certain offices and ranks, such as that of a barrister. It is however not hereditary in that case, and will not suffice for admission to most strictly "noble" organisations, unless a grant of arms is sought which gives hereditary gentility.

Formal gentility is of less social importance on the British Isles than on the Continent, and it is but one of the many factors that determine membership in the upper classes. However, those who belong to the upper or upper middle class are typically eligible for a grant of arms should they apply for it, and would then be able to use it as a formal proof of status in the Continental context.

== Sources ==
- Bradford, Gamaliel (1912). Lee the American. Houghton Mifflin Company.
- Craven, Wayne (2003). "Thomas Jefferson, Gentleman Architect". American Art: History and Culture. McGraw-Hill. ISBN 978-0-07-141524-8.
- Keen, Maurice Hugh (2002). Origins of the English Gentleman: Heraldry, Chivalry and Gentility in Medieval England, C.1300-c.1500. Stroud: Tempus. ISBN 978-0-7524-2558-0.
- Lawrence, Sir James Henry (1827) [1824]. The Nobility of the British Gentry or the Political Ranks and Dignities of the British Empire Compared with those on the Continent (2nd ed.). London: T.Hookham -- Simpkin and Marshall.
- Phillips, Walter Alison (1911). "Gentleman". In Chisholm, Hugh (ed.). Encyclopædia Britannica. Vol. 11 (11th ed.). Cambridge University Press. pp. 604–606.
- Selden, John (1614). Titles of Honour (1st ed.). London: William Stansby for Iohn Helme.
