= Jennifer Paterson =

British chef (1928–1999)

- Born: 3 April 1928; Kensington, London, England
- Died: 10 August 1999 (aged 71); Chelsea, London, England
- Resting place: Putney Vale Cemetery, London; 51.440358°N 0.238202°W
- Occupations: Celebrity cook; actress; food journalist
- Years active: 1982–1999
- Television: Two Fat Ladies (1996–1999)

Jennifer Mary Paterson (3 April 1928 – 10 August 1999) was a British celebrity cook, author, actress and television personality who appeared on the television programme Two Fat Ladies (1996–1999) with Clarissa Dickson Wright. Prior to this, she wrote cookery columns for The Spectator and for The Oldie.

Paterson and Dickson Wright were famous for their rich traditional meals made from scratch. Paterson was known for her liberal use of butter and cream, remarking on her television show in her usual manner with a shake of the hand, that yoghurt was only fit for vegetarians and those with "a poor tummy" (in relation to its use as a substitute for cream in cooking). They travelled to filming locations throughout the UK on Paterson's Triumph Thunderbird motorbike with Dickson Wright occupying the sidecar.

== Early life ==
Paterson came from an Army family, of which she later wrote, "My mother had no idea of how to cook and no wish to learn, existing on gorgonzola, coffee, and chocolates after the demise of any form of servant. My father, having gone through two World Wars, was far too frightened to put on a kettle and my brothers, who married young to very good wives... never showed any signs of wanting to whip up something delicious for a treat." Her father was Robert Paterson, an officer of the Seaforth Highlanders, and her mother was Josephine Bartlett. Paterson lived in China until she was four.

Paterson was expelled from convent school at 15 for being disruptive. She was later enrolled at Kingston School of Art.

== Career ==
Paterson worked at Padworth College, a girls' boarding school near Reading, where she rejoiced in the title of social secretary, before ending up as a cook for the Ugandan Legation in London and becoming a well-known figure on the London party circuit.

In the early 1950s, she met performer Jonathan Routh and began to work on the ITV show Candid Camera, helping to set up the hoaxes.

She later became a food writer for The Spectator; for 15 years, she provided weekly lunches for many prominent figures, including the Prince of Wales. She lived out of a suitcase or with friends, such as a flat lent to her by Viola Grosvenor, Duchess of Westminster, and became close friends with Olga Deterding.

She departed The Spectator in 1988, allegedly due to an argument with editor Charles Moore, after she had arrived to find her kitchen dirty and began throwing the dirty plates out the window. She later wrote a book of recipes and reminiscences from her time at The Spectator entitled Feast Days, Recipes from The Spectator, in the introduction to which the English writer A. N. Wilson professed, "Jennifer Paterson is the best cook I know."

== Personal life and death ==
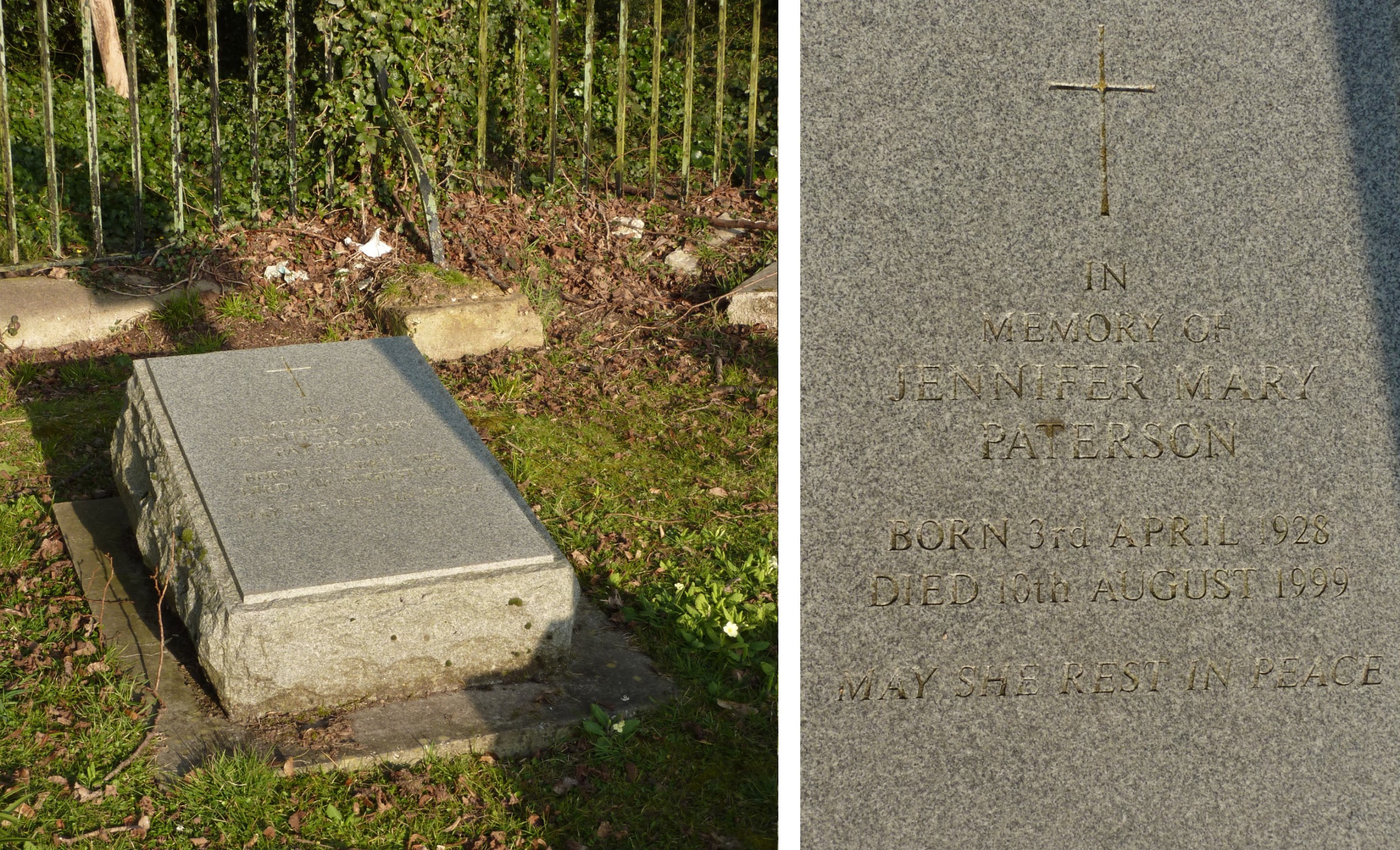

Paterson was a staunch Roman Catholic who never married or had any children. Paterson was the niece of Anthony Bartlett, the last Gentiluomo of the Archbishop of Westminster. In about 1980 Paterson moved into Bartlett's flat at 180a Ashley Gardens, Emery Hill Street, which is within sight of Westminster Cathedral, and she lived there with him until her death. She was diagnosed with lung cancer in July 1999 and died a month later in London on 10 August 1999. Paterson asked for caviar for her last meal but she died before she could eat it. Following a traditional Requiem Mass, she was cremated at Putney Vale Crematorium and her ashes were interred in the cemetery there.

Paterson was a parishioner of the London Oratory, and in her will she left a bequest to fund their choir programme.

== Bibliography ==
- Feast Days: Recipes from the Spectator (ISBN 978-0719548482) (1991)
- Two Fat Ladies: Gastronomic Adventures with Clarissa Dickson Wright (1996)
- Jennifer's Diary: By One Fat Lady (ISBN 978-1901170054) (1997 )
- Two Fat Ladies Ride Again with Clarissa Dickson Wright (1997)
- Seasonal Receipts (ISBN 978-0747276197) (1998)
- Two Fat Ladies Full Throttle with Clarissa Dickson Wright (1998)
- Two Fat Ladies – Obsessions with Clarissa Dickson Wright (1999)
- Enjoy!: A Celebration of Jennifer Paterson – Tribute to a Fat Lady by Her Friends (ISBN 978-0747272878) 2000.
- The Very Best of Two Fat Ladies : Over 150 Favourite Recipes from Their Best Selling Books with Clarissa Dickson Wright (Ebury Publishing, 2000)

== Forewords written ==
- Indian Cooking by Savitri Chowdhary (Cookery Classics – 1 September 1999)

== Television ==
- Food and Drink (1993–1995)
- Two Fat Ladies (1996–1999, 24 episodes) (With Clarissa Dickson Wright)
- Have I Got News For You (29 November 1996)
- The End of the Year Show (31 December 1996) (With Clarissa Dickson Wright)
- All Over The Shop (8 January 1997) (With Clarissa Dickson Wright)
- Songs of Praise: Food Praise (9 February 1997: Bournville) (With Clarissa Dickson Wright)
- The Rosie O'Donnell Show (23 September 1997) (With Clarissa Dickson Wright)
- The Tonight Show with Jay Leno (24 September 1997) (With Clarissa Dickson Wright)
- Jennifer Paterson's Diary (1997, 12 episodes)
- Clive Anderson All Talk (September 1997) (With Clarissa Dickson Wright)
- The End of the Year Show (31 December 1997) (With Clarissa Dickson Wright)
- Live! with Regis and Kathie Lee (18 February 1998) (With Clarissa Dickson Wright)
- Good Morning America (20 February 1998) (With Clarissa Dickson Wright)
- In the Kitchen With Bob (21 February 1998) (With Clarissa Dickson Wright) (QVC on The Shopping Network)
- Organic Food Awards (28 October 1998) (With Clarissa Dickson Wright)
- Wish You Were Here...? (1998)
- Entertainment Tonight (December 1998) (With Clarissa Dickson Wright)
- Carlton London Restaurant Awards (15 March 1999)
- Royal Television Society Awards (29 March 1999) (With Clarissa Dickson Wright)

== Films ==
- Fish and Milligan (1966) Lady Director
- Caravaggio (1986) as an Extra
- What Rats Won't Do (1998) as Justice Bradley

== DVD release ==
The Two Fat Ladies DVD set contains a 40-minute BBC tribute to Paterson that aired in 1999 (Ending Credits). The DVD box set was released in the United States in July 2008. The Acorn Media release contains all 24 episodes across four discs. The show had been released in Britain as a Region 2 DVD set.
