= Two Fat Ladies =

Television cooking programme

- Starring: Jennifer Paterson; Clarissa Dickson Wright
- Theme music composer: Peter Baikie
- Country of origin: United Kingdom
- Original language: English
- No. of series: 4
- No. of episodes: 24

Production
- Running time: 30 minutes
- Production company: Optomen Television for BBC

Original release
- Network: BBC Two
- Release: 9 October 1996 – 28 September 1999

Two Fat Ladies is a British cooking programme starring Jennifer Paterson and Clarissa Dickson Wright. It originally ran for four series – twenty-four episodes – from 9 October 1996 to 28 September 1999, being produced by Optomen Television for the BBC. Since then, the show has been repeated frequently on the Food Network and Cooking Channel in the US and on the Australian Broadcasting Corporation. In the UK, the show has been transmitted many times on the satellite channel Good Food.

== Overview ==
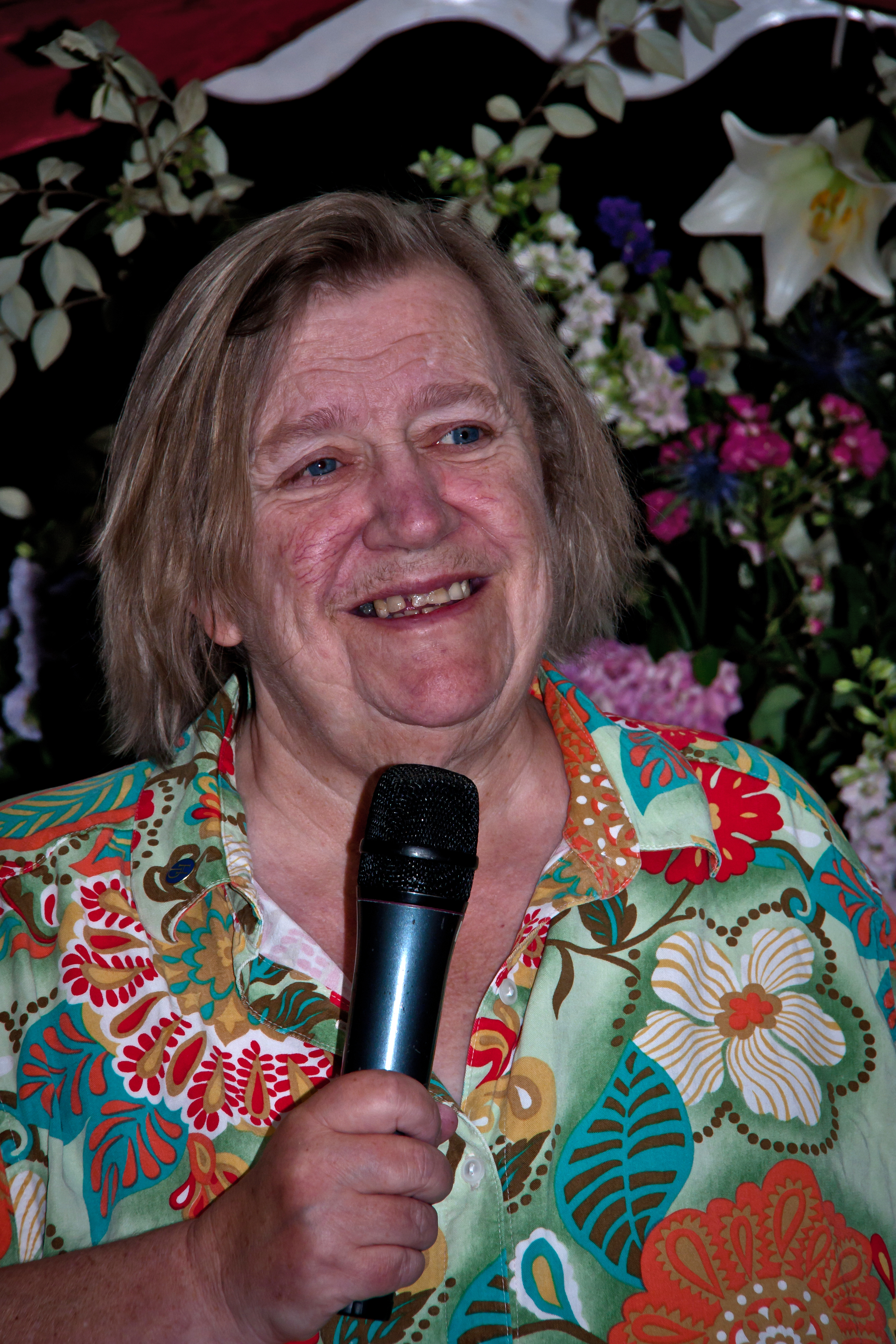
Clarissa Dickson Wright in 2011

The show centred on Jennifer Paterson and Clarissa Dickson Wright travelling the United Kingdom for most of the episodes, except for one episode in Ireland and a Christmas special in Jamaica, on a Triumph Thunderbird motorcycle driven by Paterson. It sported the registration N88 TFL (the British bingo call for number 88 is "Two Fat Ladies", initialised in the suffix "TFL" of the registration) and had a Watsonian Jubilee GP-700 "doublewide" sidecar where Dickson Wright rode. They travelled to various destinations, such as an army garrison and an all-girls school, where they prepared large meals, often with unusual ingredients.

Paterson's uncle, Anthony Bartlett, was Gentiluomo to the Archbishop of Westminster (Cardinal Basil Hume for nearly all of the show’s run), and so one episode was videotaped at Westminster Cathedral and another at an Irish convent. While cooking at Westminster Cathedral, Paterson cooked an original dish, Peaches Cardinal Hume.

Optomen Television's synopsis of the programme said, "The Ladies are cooks not chefs – they reject the pretensions and elaborations of haute cuisine and are aggressively unfashionable, delighting in such ingredients as clotted cream, lard and fatty meats."

== Cookbooks ==
"The Two Fat Ladies" produced four cookbooks which accompanied each of the four television series. In order: Two Fat Ladies: Gastronomic Adventures (with Motorbike and Sidecar), The Two Fat Ladies Ride Again, The Two Fat Ladies: Full Throttle and Two Fat Ladies Obsessions.

== Release ==
A 5 VHS boxed set was released in the United States in 1997 by New River Media. Each containing three episodes from the first two seasons, except for the fifth volume which contains "A Christmas Feast" for the Wolvesey Boys Choir. The Two Fat Ladies DVD set was released in the United States in July 2008. The Acorn Media UK set includes a 40-minute BBC tribute to Paterson, biographies of the stars and "six yummo recipes" in a booklet. It contains all 24 episodes across four discs. The show had previously been released in Britain as a Region 2 DVD set.

== Episode list ==
=== Series overview ===
Series	Episodes	Originally released	
Series	Episodes	First released	Last released
1	6	9 October 1996	13 November 1996
2	7	29 September 1997	24 December 1997
3	7	2 September 1998	22 December 1998
4	4	7 September 1999	28 September 1999

=== Series 1 (1996) ===
No. Overall	Episode Number	Title	Location	Clarissa's dishes	Jennifer's dishes	Air date
1	1	Fish & Shellfish	The Shark's Fin Hotel; Mevagissey, Cornwall	Crab, corn & coriander fritter; Gigot of monkfish with rosemary and anchovies	Fish pie; Scallops with leeks	9 October 1996
2	2	Meat	Westonbirt School; Gloucestershire	Beef à la Will Moreland; Chicken breasts with walnut aillade	Roast "Hedgehog" (meatloaf); A.N.'s slow shoulder of lamb	16 October 1996
3	3	Fruit & Vegetables	Westminster Cathedral; London	Bubble and squeak; Stuffed artichokes	Tomato summer pudding; Beanz meanz Fitz; Peaches Cardinal Hume	23 October 1996
4	4	Cakes	Hallaton, Leicestershire	Ginger bread; Danish apple & prune cake	Galette des Rois aux amandes; Chopped walnut & coffee cake	30 October 1996
5	5	Game	Lennoxlove House; East Lothian	Partridges with cabbage; Pheasant and pickled walnut terrine; Duntreath roast grouse	Rabbit with anchovies and capers; Medallions of venison with blackberries	6 November 1996
6	6	Food in the Wild	Hawkhirst Scout Camp; Kielder Forest, Northumberland	Muttachar (spiced eggs); Onion soup with Stilton; Trout from the Luau	Shooter's sandwich; Frittata with tomatoes, onions & basil	13 November 1996

=== Series 2 (1997) ===
No. Overall	Episode Number	Title	Location	Clarissa's dishes	Jennifer's dishes	Air date
7	1	Cocktail Party	The Brazilian Embassy; Mayfair, London	Blini (with sour cream and caviar); Prawns in mackintoshes (Gambas in gabardinas); Brazilian bean fritters (Acarajé)	Portuguese cod cakes (Bolinhos de bacalhau); Devils on horseback	29 September 1997
8	2	Lunch	Vintage motorcycle rally Hesket Newmarket, Cumbria	Clam chowder; Robert May's salmon	Loin of pork stuffed with cèpes or truffles; Chantal's stuffed tomatoes	6 October 1997
9	3	Picnic	Male choir in Llandudno	Welsh lamb pie; Mitton of pork	Tartine from Provence; Crème vichyssoise glacée	13 October 1997
10	4	Afternoon Tea	A cricket match Warborough, Oxfordshire	Queen Alexandra's favourite sandwiches; Rigó Jancsi's chocolate slices	Gentleman's savoury delights (shortcrust); Fresh fruit tartlets	20 October 1997
11	5	Breakfast	Black Sheep Brewery; Masham, North Yorkshire	Corn griddle cakes; Huevos rancheros	Devilled kidneys; Kedgeree; Jugged kippers	27 October 1997
12	6	Dinner	1st Battalion, The Royal Gurkha Rifles; Aldershot, Queen Elizabeth Barracks, Church Crookham	Turbot with watercress and pickled walnuts; Beef with chestnuts, pears and almonds	Coq au vin; Stuffed quail with white wine	3 November 1997
13	7 (Christmas Special)	Christmas	Winchester Cathedral Choir; The Pilgrims' School, Winchester, Hampshire	Swedish red cabbage; Christmas pudding ice cream bombe	Mousse of the egg; Roast goose with pâté and prune stuffing	24 December 1997

=== Series 3 (1998) ===
No. Overall	Episode Number	Title	Location	Clarissa's dishes	Jennifer's dishes	Air date	Viewers (millions)
14	1	Benedictine Nuns	Kylemore Abbey; Connemara, County Galway	Broad beans with dill; Tomato tartlets	Lobster and mayonnaise; Raspberry and strawberry shortcake	2 September 1998	3.85
15	2	Pony Club	The Cotswolds, Gloucestershire	Pork with clams; Chocolate crème brulée	Welsh rarebit soufflé; Pete's Pommy Pommes	9 September 1998	4.31
16	3	The Cambridge Eight	Boat club Cambridge University	Rabbit Isabel; Asturian bean and sausage soup	Peas with lettuce; Cheese and honey pie	16 September 1998	4.63
17	4	Barristers at Lincoln's Inn	Lincoln's Inn, London	Swiss chard with garlic and anchovies; Salmon mousse with cucumber sauce	Beef in pastry; Strawberry Breasts	23 September 1998	3.36
18	5	The Air Race	East Fortune Airfield, Scotland	Venison Pastie; Chocolate egg snowballs	Roasted salmon with scallops in a mustard butter sauce; Red peppers stuffed with aubergine purée	30 September 1998	4.21
19	6	Lock Keepers	Grindley Brook, Shropshire	Burnett's Woodcock; Quercyan apple cake	Soused herrings; Hoppin' John	7 October 1998	4.35
20	7 (Christmas Special)	A Caribbean Christmas	Chukka Cove Polo Club; Good Hope Country House, Jamaica	Rice and peas; Jerked suckling pig	Pumpkin Soup; Spiced bun; Rum Punch	22 December 1998	3.34

=== Series 4 (1999) ===
No. Overall	Episode Number	Title	Location	Clarissa's dishes	Jennifer's dishes	Air date	Viewers (millions)
21	1	Potatoes Galore	Jersey	Portuguese fish stew; Chocolate Pye	Boeuf Stroganoff; Crème Pierre le Grand (chicken soup)	7 September 1999	2.27
22	2	On Safari	Knowsley Safari Park; Lancashire	Devilled Poussin; Chillis stuffed with goat cheese, and tomato salsa	Lamb in filo pastry; Apple pandowdy	14 September 1999	2.87
23	3	Timber!	Ardnamurchan peninsula	Watercress mousse; Trout baked in sea salt with beurre blanc	Poule au pot; Grilled peaches and cream	21 September 1999	3.05
24	4 (Series finale)	A Day at the Races	Floors Castle, Kelso; St. Abbs, Northumberland	Green beans with Roman mustard; Barmbrack with rhubarb	Hot buttered crab; Stuffed baked codfish with a tomato sauce	28 September 1999	3.37

- Note: Series 4 was halted after the death of Jennifer Paterson shortly after completion of its fourth episode.
