= Herbert Ashman =

First Lord Mayor of Bristol

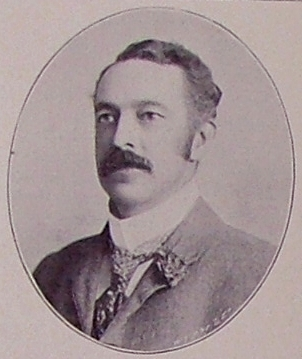
Herbert Ashman by the end of the 1890s

Sir Herbert Ashman, 1st Baronet (11 June 1854 – 26 September 1914) was the first lord mayor of Bristol.

== Early life ==
He was born in Yeovil, Somerset, the son of Thomas Nathaniel Ashman and was educated at the Independent College, Taunton.

His father moved the family to Bristol when he was only a few months old, where Herbert joined his father's leather processing business at the age of 15.

== Career ==
He later became head of his own company of Herbert Ashman & Co., leather factors, manufacturers and importers, based in Broadmead, Bristol.

He was the Liberal Councillor of St Paul's ward from 1890 to 1900 and elected Mayor of Bristol in 1898 and 1899. On 12 November 1899 he was knighted by Queen Victoria at the Council House and on 15 November 1899 became Bristol's first Lord Mayor when the Queen conferred the honour of a Lord Mayoralty on the city. In 1907 he was created a baronet. When World War I started he took on the important role of chairing the city's recruitment campaign.

He was also the president of the Anchor Society in Bristol in 1898.

== Personal life ==
In his private life he was a keen on motoring, rowing and golf.

== Death ==
He died at his home, Cook's Folly in Stoke Bishop, on 26 September 1914 after an operation for appendicitis. He is interred in the family vault in the Redland Parish Churchyard, Bristol. He had married Eliza Lorenzo in 1874 and was succeeded by their son Frederick Herbert Ashman, who died shortly after him in 1916. His youngest daughter Mary Louise married the surgeon, Sir Percy Sargent.

Baronetage of the United Kingdom
New creation	Baronet (of Thirlmere); 1907–1914	Succeeded by Frederick Ashman
