= Amberdale children's home =

Council run home in Stapleford in Nottinghamshire, England

Amberdale children's home was a council run home in Stapleford in Nottinghamshire, England, where staff committed serious sexual offences against girls and boys in the 1980s. Some staff received significant prison sentences.

== Site ==
Amberdale, in Stapleford near Nottingham, was operated by Nottinghamshire County Council from 1982 to 1996 as a centre for children experiencing problems such as abuse by their families, fostering difficulties or avoiding school.

The site later became Clayfields House Secure Unit.

== Abuse ==
Children in their mid teens were sexually exploited by staff in the 1980s, in various ways including rape. At least one girl ran away to escape ongoing sexual abuse.

Nottinghamshire Police Chief Superintendent Rob Griffin explained that its effects "can last a life-time, affecting not just the survivor themselves but also those closest to them." It persisted because "systems were not in place, across many institutions, to protect children from that abuse." Victims faced "obvious barriers to disclosure" and even successful disclosures "weren't always dealt with appropriately".

=== Child protection violations ===
Staff routinely violated safeguarding provisions, which were intended to prevent further abuse after an Amberdale carer was jailed in the 1980s for serious sexual offences. They disabled bedroom alarms at night and refused to maintain a presence on that floor. One former resident recalled having to "hold a girl up who was hanging from the staircase and shout – for what seemed an infinity – for help because there were no staff available on the floor."

No one questioned why sexually abusive staff member Dean Gathercole frequently took girls into his mother's house. His constant "touchy" physical contact child protection breaches were also mindlessly accepted.

=== Concealment ===
Some staff were suspicious of Myriam Bamkin, for example from hearing sexual activity in a boy's tent during a camping trip. They reported their concerns to Amberdale's head, who told them to keep the abuse secret.

Dean Gathercole warned a girl he raped twice in a nearby apartment not to speak about the crimes to anyone or she would be disbelieved. She only reported this to police decades later in 2014, finally enabling Gathercole to be charged.

== Victims ==
The testimony of three victims enabled the conviction of two Amberdale offenders.

Two were girls raped by Dean Gathercole – one in a nearby apartment and the other in his mother's bed. The third was sexually exploited as a boy by Myriam Bamkin.

=== Gathercole's "discharged" victim ===
The female who was raped by Dean Gathercole in his mother's bed had mixed experiences of seeking justice, including "dismissive attitudes towards young victims of abuse from the underclasses".

She was abused so severely that she ran away, fleeing Gathercole's intolerable campaign of harassment and sexual assaults. Afterwards, she could not live there because Gathercole said she was "discharged", which he said he was powerless to undo.

When she finally came forward in 2000, in Oxclose Lane police station, she was asked in an "accusatory tone" how she had been dressed and "whether I was a virgin". Police showed "no compassion, sympathy or the slightest bit of understanding", leaving her "feeling like I was the criminal, that I had done something wrong". She gave a statement and Gathercole was arrested. He was released without charge because the Crown Prosecution Service accepted his explanation for why she could describe his "undressed physique" and mother's bedroom. After police informed her that Gathercole had been sacked, she still worried about his access to other girls, causing "a mental health crisis I was not equipped to handle" and "a great deal of anxiety".

Her experience was very different after a second victim reported Gathercole to police in 2014. Operation Equinox officers worked with police in Ireland, where she was living and visited her there in 2017. She found these officers "understanding", "patient", "compassionate" and "straight-talking".

Then during the trial, she was forced to surrender all her medical, therapy and social media records to Dean Gathercole and his defence team. These intrusive demands felt like being abused "all over again".

== Sentences ==
Perpetrator	Conviction(s)	Sentence
Dean Gathercole	Rape (3 counts), indecent assault (6 counts)	17 years
Myriam Bamkin	Indecent assault	2½ years

=== Dean Gathercole ===
On 4 May 2018, social worker Dean Gathercole was convicted of serious sexual offences against a 15-year-old girl and a 16-year-old girl in Amberdale and initially jailed for 19 years, which was reduced to 17 years on appeal.

He worked in Amberdale between 1983 and 1989 and committed the crimes during that time. He was described by a victim as "a bully who instilled fear in young people".

His convictions were for raping and sexually abusing two teenage girls. He raped one girl twice in a nearby apartment that prepared teenagers for adult life and warned her that if she spoke about it, she would be disbelieved. She informed police decades later in 2014.

He raped the other girl on his mother's bed in 1987. He took the girl out in order "to run an errand" and gave her a tour of his mother's house, where he perpetrated the crime. He followed this attack with a sustained campaign of harassment and sexual assaults at Amberdale, including one in his car. In the end she fled the home. When she tried to return, Gathercole told her Amberdale had "discharged" her, which he said he was powerless to undo. She did not report the crime, fearing being disbelieved, until 2000.

In 1987 and again in 1988, Gathercole was arrested and released without charge after two girls in Amberdale reported him for serious crimes. Amberdale responded by transferring the girls elsewhere. In 1989, he left Amberdale and became a team leader in Repton Lodge – a children's home in Worksop. From 1991, he led a team in another children's home in Carlton and was sacked in 1997 for "inappropriate behaviour", suspicious financial activity and losing files on children.

When the Amberdale victim he was convicted of raping in his mother's bed reported it in 2000, Gathercole was arrested and released without charge. In 2014, when the other woman came forward, he was investigated under Operation Equinox and charged in May 2017 with eight sexual offences including two counts of rape.

After Gathercole was sentenced, Operation Equinox senior investigator Rob McKinnell thanked the two women for their "immense courage" in "showing that it can be done". He said a fear of being disbelieved "is something we have heard when it comes to non-recent cases" and nowadays "things are different, people are listened to". He continued: "I hope this case sends a message to survivors of non-recent child sexual abuse that Nottinghamshire Police takes any report very seriously. We strive to get justice for people so I would urge anyone who has experienced this to come forward and report it to us."

The NSPCC said: "Gathercole used his position of trust to groom and abuse extremely vulnerable children who needed guidance and support", causing "unimaginable pain and suffering".

Judge Jeremy Lea said Gathercole "got away with this for far too long" and it is "difficult to imagine a greater or more despicable breach of trust".

Nottinghamshire County Council apologised to Gathercole's victims, who "should have been offered the highest level of safety and protection". It said the convictions for his "horrific crimes" and "despicable" betrayal of trust was only made possible by their "determination, courage and bravery". It asked "anyone who has suffered abuse of any kind to come forward and report it either to ourselves or to Nottinghamshire Police".

=== Myriam Bamkin ===
Myriam Bamkin was jailed for 2½ years in 2018 for her sexual relationship in 1985 with a "troubled, vulnerable" 15-year-old boy and permanently added to the sex offenders' register. She was banned from work with children and had already been suspended as a fostering team manager.

The boy's childhood had been "difficult and violent", making him "troubled" and "vulnerable" when he arrived in Amberdale.

There, she "exerted authority over him" and groomed him with copious attention and extra privileges, such as letting him have cigarettes and go to the shops more often. She spent much time next to him, including in his bedroom watching TV and in the gym where she began a sexual relationship with him.

He reported her to police on 5 April 2016. She was investigated under Operation Equinox and charged in March 2017 with four sexual offences at Amberdale. She pleaded not guilty on 25 May 2017 and changed her plea to guilty for indecent assault a year later on 29 May 2018.

Detective Constable Vincent Clark welcomed the sentence and hoped it "will give the victim some closure on what happened all those years ago." He said Bamkin "manipulated" the boy into sex when he was "totally reliant on the adults around him".

Steve Edwards, the council's director of youth services and social work, praised the victim's "courageous step" of contacting police. He said "Bamkin betrayed the trust of the children she was responsible for and her colleagues" and assured victims: "All allegations of abuse, historical or current, are taken extremely seriously, and we as a council work tirelessly to bring the perpetrators to justice. I would encourage anyone who feels they have been abused to contact Nottinghamshire Police."

==== Pension controversy ====
Bamkin was allowed to retire from the council on a full pension, to the dismay of victims groups.

Nottinghamshire County Council said this was beyond its control because Local Government Pension Scheme (LGPS) Regulations enable employees to retire with a pension once they are aged between 55 and 75, and it "has no discretion to vary" this entitlement. She continued working for the council after the 1985 offences and was a fostering team manager when the crime was finally reported to police in 2016, resulting in her suspension. Then she retired before her conviction, making it impossible to apply for pension forfeiture from the Secretary of State, the council believed. It contacted "the Government and the LGPS technical team to confirm our interpretation and suggesting that they review the current regulations."

The Ministry of Housing, Communities and Local Government commented: "Forfeiture cases are rare, and each case is looked at on its own merits." It said the regulations are often reviewed.

Nottinghamshire Child Sexual Abuse Survivors Group questioned whether legal advice was sought at the time of Bamkin's suspension, because "if she had been dealt with at the time [...] the tax payer would not be footing her pension bill". It said that "in sharp contrast" to victims, Bamkin will enjoy "a very comfortable retirement". The East Midlands Survivors group said people guilty of "nasty crimes [...] should not be getting funded by the state for the rest of their lives."

== See also ==
- Beechwood children's home
