= Jenny Pearce =

Jenny Pearce is the Professor of Young People and Public Policy at the University of Bedfordshire. Her research interests include the investigation of child sexual exploitation. She was a member of the original panel of the Independent Panel Inquiry into Child Sexual Abuse prior to the inquiry's reconstitution in January 2015. She is an Officer of the Order of the British Empire. Bedfordshire University has been awarded the Queen's Anniversary Prize for applied research on child sexual exploitation influencing new safeguarding policy and practice that she has led in her role as director of The International Centre, researching child sexual exploitation, violence and trafficking.
