= Scott baronets of Beauclerc (1907) =

Escutcheon of the Scott baronets of Beauclerc

The Scott baronetcy, of Beauclerc in the County of Northumberland, was created in the Baronetage of the United Kingdom on 27 July 1907 for the businessman Walter Scott.

== Scott baronets, of Beauclerc (1907) ==
- Sir Walter Scott, 1st Baronet (1826–1910)
- Sir John Scott, 2nd Baronet (1854–1922)
- Sir Walter Scott, 3rd Baronet (1895–1967)
- Sir Walter Scott, 4th Baronet (1918–1992)
- Sir Walter John Scott, 5th Baronet (born 1948)

The heir apparent is the present holder's son Walter Samuel Scott (born 1984).

== Notes ==
Baronetage of the United Kingdom
Preceded by Philipson-Stow baronets	Scott baronets of Beauclerc; 27 July 1907	Succeeded by Ashman baronets
