= Independent Inquiry into Child Sexual Abuse =

Official inquiry in England and Wales

Logo of the Independent Inquiry into Child Sexual Abuse

The Independent Inquiry into Child Sexual Abuse (IICSA) in England and Wales was an inquiry examining how the country's institutions handled their duty of care to protect children from sexual abuse. It was announced by the British Home Secretary, Theresa May, on 7 July 2014. It published its 19th and final report on 20 October 2022.

It was set up after investigations in 2012 and 2013 into the Jimmy Savile sexual abuse scandal revealed widespread abuse, including claims of abuse stretching back over decades by prominent media and political figures, and inadequate safeguarding by institutions and organisations responsible for child welfare. Originally the inquiry was intended to be a Panel Inquiry supported by experts, similar to the Hillsborough Independent Panel. However, after strenuous objections related to the panel's scope and its independence from those being investigated, and the resignation of its first two intended chairs, the inquiry was reconstituted in February 2015 as a statutory inquiry under the Inquiries Act 2005, giving it greatly increased powers to compel sworn testimony and to examine classified information.

The first two chairs appointed to the original panel inquiry were Baroness Butler-Sloss (appointed 8 July 2014, stepped down 14 July 2014) and Fiona Woolf (appointed 5 September 2014, stepped down 31 October 2014). The reasons for their withdrawal in each case were objections related to their perceived closeness to individuals and establishments which would be investigated. There were also objections to the shape of the inquiry itself, concerning testimony, the scope of inquiry, and lack of ability to compel witnesses to testify. In December 2014, it was reported that Theresa May was reconsidering arrangements for the inquiry. On 4 February 2015, May announced that the inquiry would be chaired by Dame Lowell Goddard, a New Zealand High Court judge who had no ties to the UK bodies and persons likely to be investigated. The existing panel was disbanded, and the inquiry was given new powers as a statutory inquiry. Lowell Goddard resigned as chair in August 2016 and was replaced by Professor Alexis Jay.

The IICSA published 19 reports in all, with the last one coming on 20 October 2022, with many urgent recommendations. However, it was not until June 2026 that the government implemented any of the Inquiry's final recommendations in full through the Crime and Policing Act 2026 which abolished time limitations in cases of child sexual abuse by amending the Limitation Act 1980, s.11 (recommendation 15 of the final report).

== Background ==
In 2012, entertainer Jimmy Savile, who had died with reputation intact in 2011, was identified by police as having been a prolific child sexual abuser, who had accessed and abused children in hospitals, schools and other institutions during the previous six decades. In the ensuing investigations, a number of prominent household names in media and politics, among others, were alleged to have been responsible for, and in some cases were convicted of, child sexual abuse. Calls were raised from 2012 onwards for a public inquiry into child sexual abuse, and to examine how such failings had been possible, and to what extent those responsible for these institutions had known of the abuse, or had cause to be aware.

In June 2014 a cross-party group of seven MPs, co-ordinated by Tim Loughton and Zac Goldsmith, wrote to the Home Secretary, Theresa May, calling on her to set up an overarching investigation into a series of cases in the United Kingdom concerning allegations of historic child sex abuse within government and other institutions. Goldsmith said that "The Government should establish – and properly resource – an independent inquiry so that a line can be drawn, once and for all." Other MPs were quick to add their names to the call for an inquiry, and within three weeks more than 150 British MPs were backing the call for an inquiry.

An inquiry was set up in 2014, initially constituted as a panel. However, this led to public complaints on several grounds: that the panel's scope was too limited (and specifically it could not compel testimony, sworn or unsworn), and that those involved had past links to those persons and bodies known to have been sexual abusers or who might be investigated as part of the panel's work, and therefore that the panel's independence from the establishment was in question. Two chairs were appointed and resigned in 2014, both having had past links with possible subjects of the inquiry. The inquiry was, therefore, finally re-established as a statutory inquiry under the Inquiries Act 2005, in February 2015, and a New Zealand High Court judge appointed as chair, to address these concerns.

== Panel Inquiry (2014–2015) ==
=== Remit and scope ===
The inquiry was announced by Theresa May, on 7 July 2014. She said that "In recent years we have seen appalling cases of organised and persistent child sex abuse that have exposed serious failings by public bodies and important institutions...That is why the government has established an independent panel of experts to consider whether these organisations have taken seriously their duty of care to protect children from sexual abuse." She said that it was possible that it could become a full public inquiry with the power to subpoena witnesses.

The initial announcement stated that the inquiry would examine the duty of care taken by British public bodies and other notable institutions in protecting children from sexual abuse. Individual cases of abuse would not be investigated by the inquiry, but Baroness Butler-Sloss said that she would be willing to hear of such cases. The institutions to be scrutinised included the police, the courts, the education system, the BBC and the NHS. The expert panel would also have the power to examine the behaviour of political parties, the security services and private companies. The panel was expected to report interim findings in advance of the general election in May 2015.

=== Chair of inquiry ===
On 8 July, it was announced that Baroness Butler-Sloss would chair the inquiry. She stated that she was "honoured to have been invited to lead this inquiry...We will begin this important work as soon as possible." The Permanent Secretary at the Home Office, Mark Sedwill, said that Butler-Sloss had promised to "leave no stone unturned", and that he believed her report would "be thorough and complete". The former Parliamentary Under-Secretary of State for Children and Families, Tim Loughton MP, said that Butler-Sloss would "command great respect, great expertise and great knowledge which is absolutely what we need at the head of this inquiry".

Criticisms were raised over the choice of Butler-Sloss as chair of the inquiry, as she was described as part of "the establishment" due to her membership of the House of Lords and her brother Michael Havers having been Attorney General for England and Wales during the 1980s. The Labour Member of Parliament Simon Danczuk said that "We don't want it [to] look like an establishment inquiry—that would send out the wrong signal to the public." Former Solicitor-General Vera Baird said that Butler-Sloss was linked through her family "to the very establishment that this inquiry is being set up to look at... She is going to have to investigate the role played by her late brother." Questions were also raised about her report in 2011 into child abuse in the Church of England, with claims that she had been biased in favour of the church.

On 14 July, it was announced that Baroness Butler-Sloss was standing down from the inquiry, and that a new chair would be appointed. It was announced on 5 September that the new chair would be Fiona Woolf, a City solicitor then Lord Mayor of London, and that she would be assisted by Graham Wilmer, founder of the Lantern Project for abuse victims, and Barbara Hearn, former deputy chief executive of the National Children's Bureau. Alexis Jay, chair of the Independent Inquiry into Child Sexual Exploitation in Rotherham, would also be a member of the panel.

In October 2014, the chairing of the inquiry again became contentious after Fiona Woolf disclosed that she lived in the same street in London as Lord (Leon) Brittan and had, amongst other connections with them, invited the Conservative peer and his wife to dinner on three occasions. Lord Brittan was Home Secretary in 1984 when ministers were handed a dossier on alleged high-profile paedophiles which later disappeared; Brittan insisted that the proper procedures had been followed. Labour MP Simon Danczuk, who had campaigned for the inquiry to be established, told the BBC he thought Woolf should resign, accusing the Home Office of a "total error of judgement”. He added: “One mistake is forgivable... to make the same mistake twice looks like they're out to protect Leon Brittan. I don't buy the view that you can't choose someone to chair this inquiry who is not connected to Leon Brittan and yet the government seem to have been insistent on choosing chairpeople who are very much establishment, very much connected to people involved". A second Labour MP, John Mann, also criticised the appointment, saying it was “totally impossible for Fiona Woolf to now properly chair child abuse inquiry” given that "Leon Brittan oversaw significant inquiries that vanished". However, Woolf told MPs that Brittan was "one of thousands of people" she knew and was not a "close associate"; the government said it continued to back her appointment. Home Secretary Theresa May also supported Woolf's appointment, saying: "Fiona Woolf has a long and distinguished career throughout which she has demonstrated the highest standards of integrity. I am confident that she will lead the work of the panel with authority, and that under her leadership the panel will get to the truth of these issues".

On 22 October 2014, the BBC reported that it had seen a judicial review application launched by a victim of historical child sexual abuse which challenged the choice of Fiona Woolf as the chair of the inquiry on the basis that she is not impartial, has no relevant expertise and may not have time to discharge her duties. However, the judicial review became unnecessary on 31 October 2014, when Woolf announced that she was resigning as chair of the inquiry. Her decision came on the day that victims and survivors of child abuse said that they were "unanimous" that she should quit, citing her social links with ex-Home Secretary Lord Brittan; their announcement came immediately after a meeting with Home Office officials. In a statement, Home Secretary Theresa May said that she had accepted Woolf's decision "with regret".

After the other Panel members were announced, the First Minister of Wales, Carwyn Jones, and the Children's Commissioner for Wales, Keith Towler, both criticised the fact that none of the Panel members had direct experience of child protection in Wales, a devolved matter. Jones said: "If this is to be a process for the whole of England and Wales together as two nations then there has to be a Welsh representative on the body."

Chairs of the inquiry
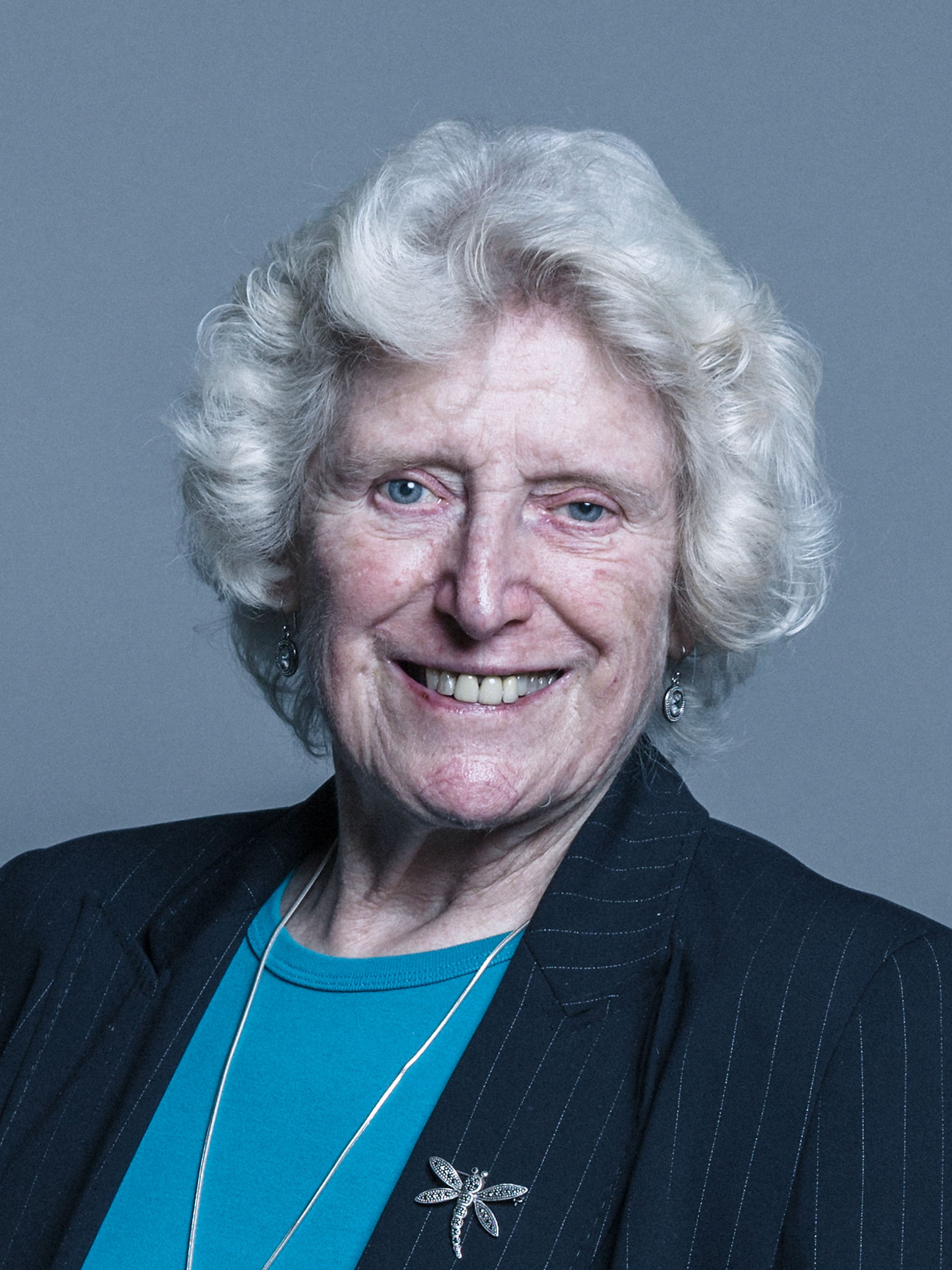
Baroness Butler-Sloss
(July 2014)

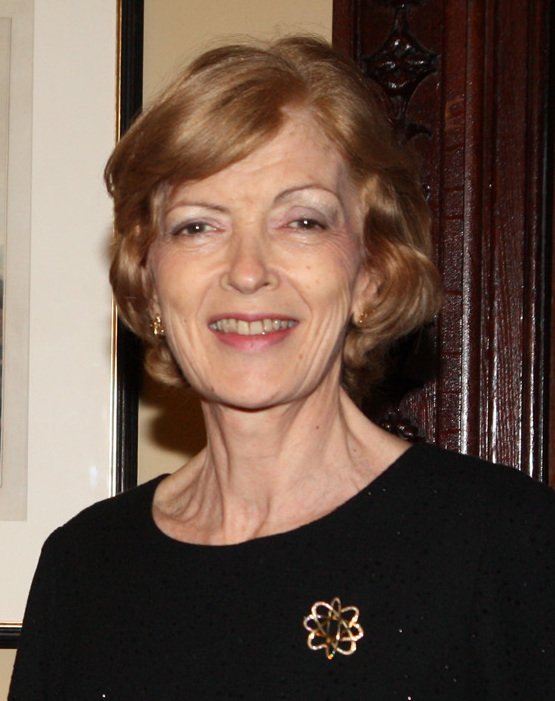
Fiona Woolf
(Sept—Oct 2014)

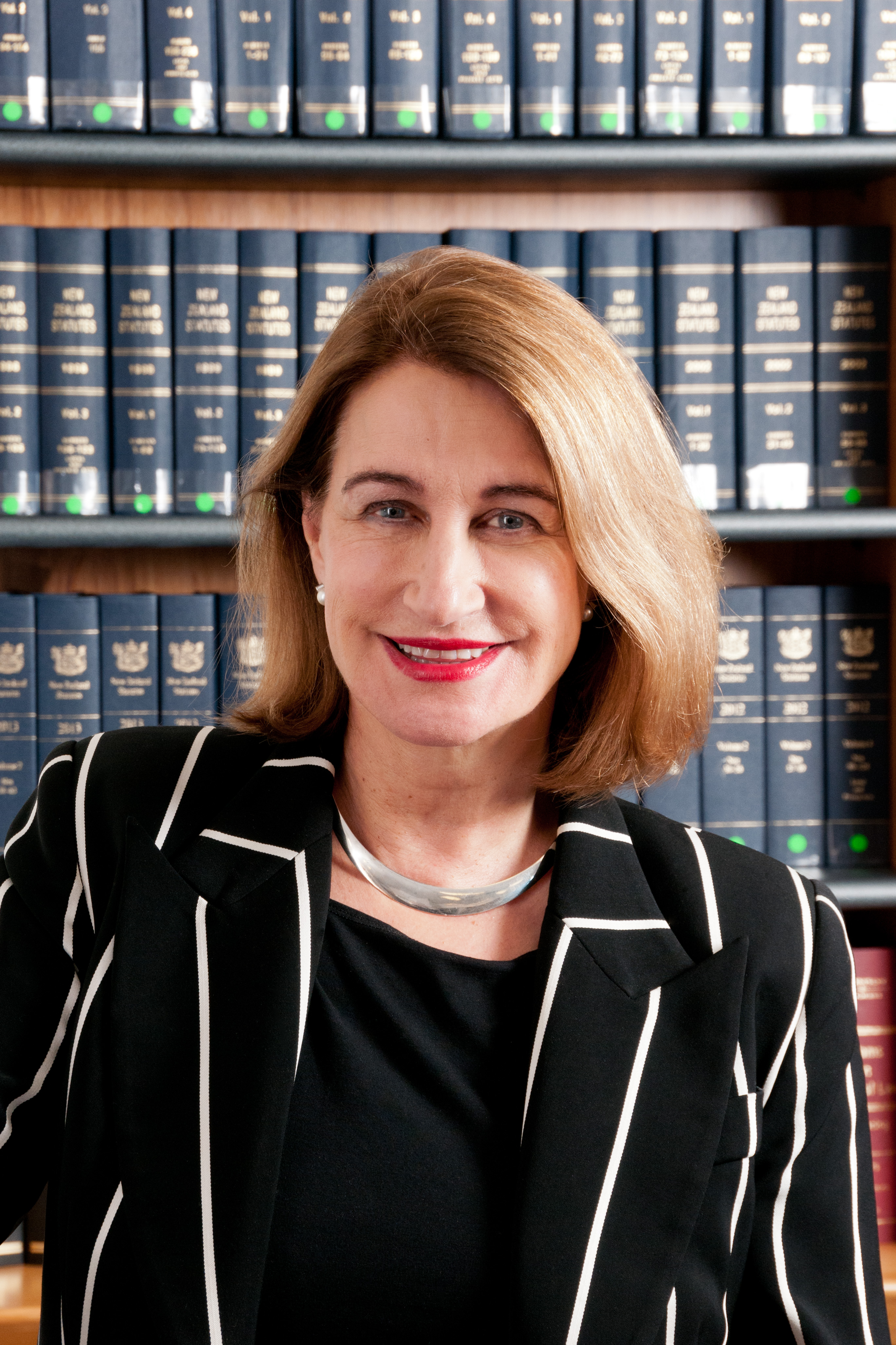
Dame Lowell Goddard
(Feb 2015—Aug 2016)

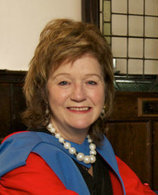
Alexis Jay
(Aug 2016—October 2022)

=== Panel members ===
The members of the panel until its reconstitution in February 2015 were:

- Counsel: Ben Emmerson QC
- Graham Wilmer
- Barbara Hearn
- Ivor Frank
- Professor Jenny Pearce
- Drusilla Sharpling
- Sharon Evans
- Moira Gibb
- Professor Terence Stephenson

=== Reconsideration of Inquiry arrangements ===
On 21 December 2014, it was reported that Theresa May was reconsidering arrangements for the inquiry, and that the panel could be abandoned. The options that were reportedly being considered included turning the existing inquiry into a statutory inquiry; setting up a fresh statutory inquiry; or establishing a Royal Commission. According to the Exaro news website, May wrote to each panel member with the proposals following a meeting with them earlier in the month, adding that existing panel members could be considered for roles under the new arrangements. One panel member, Sharon Evans, reported that she felt "devastated" at the proposal, but that it had been made clear that the panel would be abolished early in 2015. She highlighted that a greater number of survivors the inquiry panel had already met with had provided feedback, with 90% saying they had confidence in the existing panel. Representatives of abuse survivors groups wrote to May calling for a new inquiry with legal powers to compel witnesses to give evidence under oath.

== Materials found at National Archives ==
In January 2015, an academic researcher found in The National Archives a reference to a file regarding allegations of "unnatural" sexual behaviour taking place at Westminster that probably went to the Prime Minister (Margaret Thatcher) in the early 1980s. The file was entitled "Allegations against former public [missing word] of unnatural sexual proclivities; security aspects 1980 Oct 27 – 1981 Mar 20." The file was classified as it contained information from the security services and Law Officers. The Cabinet Office initially stated that any pertinent files would be made available to the forthcoming Independent Panel Inquiry into Child Sexual Abuse. The file was shortly afterwards made public, and related to the diplomat Sir Peter Hayman.

== Statutory inquiry ==
On 4 February 2015, Theresa May announced that the inquiry would be chaired by Dame Lowell Goddard, a New Zealand High Court judge. The existing panel would be disbanded, and the inquiry would be given new powers. It would be a statutory inquiry established under the Inquiries Act 2005, and Goddard would be able to compel witnesses to attend and give evidence. Criteria for selecting the panel were republished, and members of the outgoing panel were free to reapply. Ben Emmerson QC would remain as counsel to the Inquiry.

Emmerson said:

It is important to stress that this is a completely fresh start. The inquiry that the Home Secretary has announced today will be a statutory inquiry established under the 2005 Inquiries Act. Unlike the previous panel inquiry it will have powers to compel the attendance of witnesses and the production of evidence by institutions and individuals. Justice Goddard and her legal advisers will be able to review open and classified sources. This new inquiry will therefore have all the powers it needs to penetrate deeply into the institutions that have failed children in the past, and to identify those institutions that are reportedly continuing to fail children today. And it will do so under the leadership of an exceptionally experienced judge.

On 12 March 2015 the Home Secretary made a written statement establishing the Inquiry as a statutory inquiry, the Panel, and the Inquiry's terms of reference. The IICSA's terms of reference were:

To consider the extent to which state and non-state institutions have failed in their duty of care to protect children from sexual abuse and exploitation; to consider the extent to which those failings have since been addressed; to identify further action needed to address any failings identified; to consider the steps which it is necessary for state and non-state institutions to take in order to protect children from such abuse in future; and to publish a report with recommendations.

The inquiry opened on 9 July 2015, with an introductory statement by Justice Goddard setting out its procedures, timetables and remit. She said that the inquiry "provides a unique opportunity to expose past failures of institutions to protect children, to confront those responsible, to uncover systemic failures, to provide support to victims and survivors, in sharing their experiences, and to make recommendations that will help prevent the sexual abuse and exploitation of children in the future." Members of the new Inquiry Panel were announced as:

- Professor Malcolm Evans, an international lawyer specialising in freedom of religion and prevention of torture
- Ivor Frank, a barrister with experience in child protection, human rights and family law.
- Professor Alexis Jay, a former director of social services who led the inquiry into child sexual exploitation in Rotherham
- Drusilla Sharpling, a former chief Crown prosecutor who subsequently inspected policing responses to child abuse.

The statutory inquiry opened on 9 July 2015, with an introductory statement by Dame Lowell Goddard. In November 2015, she announced that 12 separate investigations would be undertaken as part of the inquiry, including investigations into MPs, local councils, and church organisations. On 4 August 2016, May's successor as Home Secretary, Amber Rudd, announced that Goddard had resigned. In a statement, Goddard said that she had taken the decision "with regret", citing, among other reasons, the inquiry's "legacy of failure". Rudd announced on 11 August that Professor Alexis Jay would become the fourth chairman for the Inquiry.

=== Scope ===
Justice Goddard announced on 27 November 2015 that 12 separate investigations would be undertaken. These would cover:

- Children in the care of Lambeth Council
- Children in the care of Nottinghamshire councils
- Cambridge House, Knowl View and Rochdale Council
- Child sexual abuse in the Anglican Church
- Child sexual abuse in the Roman Catholic Church
- The sexual abuse of children in custodial institutions
- Child sexual abuse in residential schools
- The internet and child sexual abuse
- Child exploitation by organised networks
- The protection of children outside the United Kingdom
- Accountability and reparations for victims and survivors
- Allegations of child sexual abuse linked to Westminster

She said that the scale of the inquiry was unprecedented, and that it would take five years, but she was determined that it would succeed. She added that all the investigations would start immediately, and that most if not all would include public hearings. As of November 2018, there were 280 individual complainants and seven groups of complainants:

- Minister and Clergy Sexual Abuse Survivors
- Shirley Oaks Survivors Association
- West London Benedictine Order Abuse Survivors
- Comboni Survivors Group
- White Flowers Alba
- Forde Park Survivor Group
- Stanhope Castle Survivor Group

In January 2016, a 13th investigation was launched into Lord Greville Janner, who had died the previous month so that no trial could take place. The Inquiry said it would not let down the victims and survivors. Edward Brown (barrister) was appointed as leading Counsel at Janner's investigation.

It was reported in February 2019 that many more cases of abuse than had been thought, sexual and physical, had taken place on children in custody in young offender facilities, secure training centres and secure children's homes. Most claims were made against staff.

In May 2020, it was revealed that a 2018 IICSA report regarding child sex abuse at the Downside School later resulted in major financial problems for the school due to spiralling legal costs, which in turn forced the school to sell some of its Renaissance-era paintings to raise money.

=== Replacement of Chair ===
On 4 August 2016, Home Secretary Amber Rudd announced that Goddard had resigned from the Inquiry with immediate effect. In a statement, Goddard said that she had taken the decision "with regret", and referred to the difficulty she had faced in "relinquishing my career in New Zealand and leaving behind my beloved family", adding: "The conduct of any public inquiry is not an easy task, let alone one of the magnitude of this. Compounding the many difficulties was its legacy of failure which has been very hard to shake off and with hindsight it would have been better to have started completely afresh." Her resignation followed a report in The Times that, during her first year as chair, she had spent three months on holiday or abroad. Keith Vaz, the chair of the Home Affairs Select Committee, said that Goddard should give a full explanation of her resignation to MPs, and there were reports of "friction" between her and the inquiry's officials.

Rudd announced on 11 August that panel member Professor Alexis Jay would now chair the Inquiry. Some survivor groups welcomed the appointment; others were critical, for example not wanting a social worker running the inquiry.

=== Senior legal advisers ===
In September 2016, there was press speculation that the Inquiry's most senior lawyer, Ben Emmerson, might leave the Inquiry. The Inquiry then announced on 28 September, without giving details, that Emmerson was to be suspended and put under investigation as it had become "very concerned about aspects of Mr Emmerson’s leadership of the counsel team". At the time of Emmerson's suspension, there were comments that the process was "careering out of control" and had been beset by "catastrophe after catastrophe" ... "a devastating blow for survivors". Former Director of Public Prosecutions Lord Macdonald said that Emmerson's suspension made it likely that the inquiry would end up as an "embarrassing fiasco". As of September 2016, the Inquiry had held no evidence session. The Home Office said that its commitment to the inquiry, owed to victims and survivors, continued.

On 29 September, Emmerson resigned from his position, saying that "it is now time for someone else to take the helm". He denied that his resignation was due to differences of opinion with the Inquiry's chair, Alexis Jay. It was confirmed that Emmerson's colleague and deputy, Elizabeth Prochaska, had also resigned.

In November 2016, it was revealed that several other senior lawyers to the Inquiry had left their positions. Shadow Home Secretary Diane Abbott said that the Inquiry faced a "crisis of credibility", and sought an explanation from the government. The Home Secretary, Amber Rudd, said that she had confidence in the Inquiry's leadership, but on 18 November the largest victims' group involved, the Shirley Oaks Survivors Association, representing people who had lived in children's homes run by Lambeth Council, said that it was withdrawing from involvement, and described the Inquiry as a "debacle" which "lurched from disaster to disaster".

On 10 January 2017, it was announced that Brian Altman QC would become the lead Counsel to the Inquiry.

== June 2017 withdrawal of SOIA ==
In June 2017, the group Survivors of Organised and Institutional Abuse (SOIA) withdrew "with deep regret" from the inquiry, as they considered it was "not fit for purpose". They said that survivors had been "totally marginalised" and that the inquiry had descended into a "very costly academic report-writing and literature review exercise". An IICSA spokesperson said that they regretted the withdrawal, but the inquiry would continue.

== November 2020 report on Catholic Church ==
In November 2020, IICSA published a 144-page report, Safeguarding in the Roman Catholic Church in England and Wales, which said that the Catholic Church of England and Wales "swept under the carpet" allegations of sex abuse by many individuals, including priests, monks and volunteers, in England and Wales. The report said about Vincent Nichols, a cardinal since 2014 and the leader of the Catholic church in England and Wales, "There was no acknowledgement of any personal responsibility", and that Nichols protected the reputation of the Church rather than protecting victims, and lacked compassion towards victims.

On 2 September 2021, the inquiry published Child protection in religious organisations and settings - Investigation Report, after examining evidence from 38 groups, including sects from Christianity, Orthodox Judaism and Islam. "Shocking failings" and "blatant hypocrisy" in the way major UK religious groups handle child sex abuse allegations were found. The report said that some religious organisations were "morally failing" children, discouraging the reporting of abuse to protect reputations, blaming victims for their abuse, and responding to allegations using religious dogma.

== Final Report ==
The IICSA published its final report on 20 October 2022. In accordance with the Inquiry's Terms of Reference, the Report set out the main findings about the extent to which state and non-state institutions failed in their duty of care to protect children from sexual abuse and exploitation and makes recommendations for reform.

The report included recommendations for government as "a matter of urgency". There were a number of recommendations:

- the introduction of a statutory requirement of mandatory reporting. In effect, it requires individuals in certain employments (paid or voluntary) and professions to report allegations of child sexual abuse to the relevant authorities;
- the establishment of a national redress scheme for England and for Wales, to provide some monetary redress for child sexual abuse for those who have been let down by institutions in the past;
- to secure the long-term spotlight on child sexual abuse through the creation of a Child Protection Authority (CPA) in England and in Wales;
- a single set of core data relating to child sexual abuse and child sexual exploitation;
- the creation of a cabinet-level Minister for Children;
- a public awareness campaign on child sexual abuse;
- a ban on the use of pain compliance techniques on children in custodial institutions;
- amendment of the Children Act 1989 to give parity of legal protection to children in care;
- registration of care staff in residential care, and staff in young offender institutions and secure training centres;
- improved compliance with statutory duties to inform the Disclosure and Barring Service about individuals who may pose a risk of harm to children;
- extending the disclosure regime to those working with children overseas;
- extended use of the barred list of people unsuitable for work with children;
- more robust age-verification requirements for the use of online platforms and services;
- mandatory online pre-screening for sexual images of children;
- a guarantee of specialist therapeutic support for child victims of sexual abuse;
- a code of practice for access to records pertaining to child sexual abuse;
- removal of the three-year limitation period for personal injury claims brought by victims; and
- further changes to the Criminal Injuries Compensation Authority.

=== Government response to the Final Report ===
Home Secretary Suella Braverman gave the government's response to the Final Report, which was published in May 2023. She wrote in the foreword, "I am delighted that we have accepted the need to act on all but one of the Inquiry’s recommendations, and so demonstrate how seriously the Government takes the Inquiry’s findings. Each of those recommendations covers an extensive programme of work which will deliver real change for the future. I hope you will take the time to read our response to each in detail. But here I want to highlight three key measures which underscore the weight of our commitment to victims and survivors".

However, core participant Stephen Bernard pointed out in a letter to the Guardian in late 2024, after the Archbishop of Canterbury's resignation had been forced due to his failure to act on abuse by John Smyth, that none of the recommendations had been implemented, with no progress by the Home Office or the Ministry of Justice; the MoJ had closed a further unnecessary consultation but published no response to the report. In December 2025, during the progress of the Crime and Policing Act 2026, Alison Levitt, Baroness Levitt, Under-Secretary of State for Justice, told the Lords that she had met with Jan Royall, Baroness Royall, and Bernard regarding time limitations and had been "moved by what Mr Bernard told me". In April 2026 she thanked Baroness Royall and Bernard ("who has played a big part in ensuring the government reached this decision") when she became the first minister to legislate to implement any of the twenty recommendations of the final IICSA report in full when the Crime and Policing Act 2026 abolished time limitations in cases of child sexual abuse.

== See also ==
- Operation Hydrant
- Child sexual abuse in the United Kingdom
- Northern Ireland Historical Institutional Abuse Inquiry
- Scottish Child Abuse Inquiry
- Royal Commission into Institutional Responses to Child Sexual Abuse, in Australia
- Jimmy Savile sexual abuse scandal
- Medomsley Detention Centre
- Beechwood children's home
