= Sir John Scott, 5th Baronet =

Sir Johnny Scott Bt
- Born: 1948 (age 77–78)
- Spouses: Lowell Goddard (m. 1969, divorced) Mary Gavin Anderson (m. 1977)

Sir Walter John "Johnny" Scott, (born 1948) is the 5th Baronet of Beauclerc in the County of Northumberland. He succeeded his father Sir Walter Scott as baronet in 1992. He is a natural historian, broadcaster, columnist, countryside campaigner and farmer.

As of 2016, he held the following positions:

- Joint Master, The North Pennine Hunt
- President, The Union of Country Sports Workers
- President, The Gamekeepers Welfare Trust
- President, The Tay Valley Wildfowlers Association
- Centenary Patron, British Association for Shooting and Conservation.

Sir John is best known for writing and co-presenting the BBC2 series Clarissa and the Countryman, with the late Clarissa Dickson Wright. He currently writes for a variety of magazines and periodicals on field sports, food, farming, travel, history and the countryside, including The Field.

== Marriage ==
He was married to Lowell Goddard in 1969 and they had one daughter, born in 1970; the marriage later ended in divorce. In 1977 he married Mary Gavin Anderson.

== Publications ==
- Clarissa and the Countryman with Clarissa Dickson Wright (Headline Publishing Group, 2000)
- Clarissa and the Countryman: Sally Forth with Clarissa Dickson Wright (Headline Publishing Group, 2001)
- Sunday Roast: The Complete Guide to Cooking and Carving withClarissa Dickson Wright (Headline Publishing Group, 2003)
- The Game Cookbook with Clarissa Dickson Wright (Kyle Cathie, 2004)
- A Greener Life: The Modern Country Compendium with Clarissa Dickson Wright (F&W Media International (previously David & Charles), 2007)
- A Book of Britain (HarperCollins, 2010)

Baronetage of the United Kingdom
Preceded by Walter Scott	Baronet (of Beauclerc); 1992–present	Incumbent
