= Gentiluomo of the Archbishop of Westminster =

Bodyguard to the Archbishop of Westminster

The Gentiluomo of the Archbishop of Westminster in the Roman Catholic Church of Great Britain was a bodyguard (compare the royal Gentleman at arms) and personal attendant to the Archbishop. The title originates from the Latin gentilis homo (gentleman) by way of Italian, gentile uomo. The Gentiluomo's job was to guard his master, as the Archbishop was not permitted to carry a weapon (in accordance with his role as a cleric). The position of Gentiluomo was, in effect, hereditary.

The post was abolished on the death of Cardinal Basil Hume in 1999, although the last holder, Anthony Bartlett OBE (1913–2000), was allowed to hold the title until his death. He had served five cardinals in this role, and his father had preceded him in the office.
