= Beechwood children's home =

Former care home in Nottinghamshire, England

Beechwood children's home was a care home for children in Mapperley in Nottinghamshire, England, where staff committed serious sexual and "sadistic" abuse against children spanning several decades before it closed in 2006. Some abusive staff received lengthy prison sentences.

By June 2019, 136 former residents had reported being sexually abused there, which police considered "the small tip of a very large iceberg".

Beechwood was described by witnesses as "intimidating", "like a prison", "a horrible place" and having a "really toxic mix" of people. It was considered "appalling and squalid" by staff and "atrocious" by a psychologist. A judge later called it "a home from hell".

== Site ==
The Beechwood site, in Mapperley, Nottinghamshire, is known to have been a children's home in 1966 and there were reports of Beechwood operating as one in the 1950s. It has also at various times been a remand home and an "observation and assessment centre". It was jointly run by Nottingham City Council and Nottinghamshire County Council. Some local residents opposed it with a "Close Beechwood" campaign.

Police found the centre was "riddled with abuse" between the late 1960s and late 1980s. Staff reports and a psychologist found it "appalling and squalid" and visiting psychologist asked "how is it we can place young people in such atrocious conditions?" A council social services leader in the 1990s said Beechwood had an "intimidating" atmosphere and a "macho" undercurrent and she "didn't feel comfortable". A second female professional visitor agreed: "It was a very macho place. You went in and there were a lot of male workers, with a lot of power. They were very keen to show who was boss."

Beechwood was closed in 2006.

=== Buildings ===
By 1976, Beechwood consisted of four buildings – the "Lindens", "Enderleigh" and "Redcot" units and an administration building.

The main "Lindens" building was built in 1887 and became the home of eye surgeon Charles Bell Taylor. Later, its owners included a brewing family. By the 1960s, it was a children's care home and sometimes had other names, until it closed in 1990. It was sold in 2013, with the £550,000 sale price divided evenly between the city and county council. The buyers converted it to a single-family home and moved in. In 2018, some abuse victims wanted the Lindens razed. Haunted by memories from the late 1970s, one victim who would often pass by said: "The sooner they knock the Lindens down the better, for me. Please, please, let's have that building demolished."

The "Enderleigh" building included a "notorious" padded cell. A victim later recalled it "looked like a lovely house" from the outside, but upon entering, "the atmosphere changed" and "it was a horrible place" with boarded up doors, a "damp and fusty" smell and "nothing in there that was soft or homely". The baths "were either freezing or boiling" and the bathrooms were missing doors, offering no privacy. It was a care home from 1967 to 1978 and was later demolished.

The "Redcot" building was a children's care home from the mid-1960s or earlier, until 2006. It housed 17 children in 1986, aged between 10 and 17. It was later demolished and replaced with private houses.

== Abuse ==
Staff subjected the children to numerous forms of serious sexual and physical abuse.

They raped children and forced them into fights and masturbation competitions, then punished them for trying to speak out about it. A victim who was sexually abused in Beechwood in the 1980s testified that it was a violent place with "a lot of shouting" and "challenging behaviour", where care staff made children scream by painfully twisting their arms, dragged girls by the hair and sadistically forced boys to fight each other before beating up the loser. She was sent there as a 12-year-old girl.

Children's basic dignity was routinely violated. Some were prevented from leaving by being stripped naked and one victim recalled that the bathrooms had no doors, "so anyone walking by could see whatever you were doing in there".

One girl who had been raped before being taken into care was raped again by the same man in Beechwood.

When Beechwood permanently closed in the 2000s, hundreds of children had lived there and many suffered life-long harm.

=== Concealment ===
Some children were punished when they tried to report being raped by care workers. Detective Inspector Mandy Johnson said children were too frightened to report abuse because of Beechwood's ferocious regime in which "Punishments were quite brutal, people being kicked and punched, and split lips and bloodied noses, which made it very difficult for the children to be able to go to staff to disclose what was happening to them".

A victim explained to an inquiry: "When a grown man turns around and says: 'I'm going to kill you' – what does a child say to that?" Another was repeatedly warned by her abuser: "It's my say-so whether you go home at the end of this term".

In the 2000s, staff ignored a report of an attempted sexual attack by one resident against another and stopped the male victim from informing police by threatening to move him elsewhere. Reporting the assault to Beechwood staff was "like I never told them" and "like talking to a brick wall".

==== IICSA witnesses ====
Some professionals involved with Beechwood described to the Independent Inquiry into Child Sexual Abuse (IICSA) being pressured into silence by council managers.

Michelle Foster, a Beechwood carer in the 2000s, described being visited by a council overseer the day before a Beechwood suicide victim's inquest. She testified that the overseer told her not to inform the inquest about the sexual activity and drug-taking at Beechwood or she would be sacked. Foster said managers "obstructed anything I put to them", wanted "yes men" and that "anybody else was called a trouble-[maker]". She described Beechwood as overcrowded, understaffed and having a "really toxic mix" of people.

Investigations officer Bronwen Cooper testified that in 2001, the same council overseer "convinced" her to withdraw a recommendation to close Beechwood from a draft investigation report that was meant to be independent. Cooper's independence was "slightly compromised", she said, by being a council employee. The retracted recommendation referred to staff's "inappropriate behaviour", which put children "at a high level of risk" of being abused.

The overseer accused of silencing Foster and Cooper denied this to the IICSA and denied Foster's assessment of Beechwood as overcrowded, saying that overcrowding happened on "emergency" occasions. She denied having "absolved myself of responsibility" for abuse at Beechwood. A second council manager also denied the dismissal threat against Foster.

=== Victims ===
Many Beechwood residents abused by staff, both male and female, suffered lifelong harm. Police believe the 136 former residents who contacted the Independent Inquiry into Child Sexual Abuse (IICSA) having been abused there are "the small tip of a very large iceberg".

==== Joni Cameron-Blair ====
Joni Cameron-Blair was placed in Beechwood in 1981 to protect her from her violent drunken father, who had struck her head with the back of an axe causing unconsciousness and an injury that necessitated hospitalisation.

When she reported her father's attack to police, the officer sexually assaulted her.

Beechwood proved to be even more unsafe than her family home. She found it "the most terrifying ordeal I have ever had" with most staff "beating kids and doing awful things". She said: "Staff would routinely punch children in the face. They would kick children down the stairs, spit in their food, spit in their faces, pull children round by the hair." She witnessed staff deliberately provoking a boy by spitting in his food, then severely assaulting him when he reacted angrily. She also witnessed staff sexually abusing the children.

She informed a social worker and a psychiatrist of her constant state of fear, to no avail. Only her mother's efforts enabled her to leave Beechwood after 10 weeks. Leaving involved returning to her dangerous father, who resumed physically abusing her.

==== "Laura" ====
"Laura" was sent to Beechwood's "horrible" Enderleigh unit for several weeks just before her 15th birthday, where John Dent sexually abused her.

She had felt "unloved" by her family and was brought there by a social worker when she returned home from school, leaving her feeling "abandoned" and "absolutely heartbroken". Laura recalled immediately noticing Enderleigh's dispiriting atmosphere, boarded up doors, "fusty" smell, missing bathroom doors, baths that were "either freezing or boiling" and "nothing in [Enderleigh] that was soft or homely".

John Dent initially groomed her by adopting a friendly demeanour and by giving her alcohol and tobacco. Then he climbed on top of her bed one night, waking her up and terrorising her. He covered her mouth with his hand, told her to "be quiet" and sexually assaulted her. There was no one she felt confident reporting it to. She feared being disbelieved because "people would just think I was a rebellious teenager and making excuses, that I was in a care home and I wanted to get out."

Then her roommate was moved away, leaving her alone each night. Dent sexually assaulted Laura again "at every available opportunity" and stopped her from reporting it by reminding her over and over again "It's my say-so whether you go home at the end of this term".

When she left Beechwood, she overdosed and spent years feeling "awful". Her "education was ruined" and the abuse left her suffering post-traumatic stress disorder (PTSD), vivid flashbacks and depression, for decades.

She was the first victim to report Dent to the police. Later, other victims also did so, leading to a conviction and a seven-year prison sentence. She remained terrified of retribution by Dent for decades afterwards.

She and other victims want all police officers working with abuse victims to be specially trained, and a new independent body to hold social services records to prevent them from being destroyed.

She wants councils held to account because "It's such an enormous scale of abuse" and "I can't believe the evil that happened in those places. I really can't."

==== Claire Blake ====
Claire Blake, who was abused in Beechwood from the late 1980s to the early 1990s, was "still suffering" in 2019. She "didn't even have respect for myself, never mind anyone else, I just existed." While welcoming that the abuse was acknowledged at long last, she wanted accountability: "The people that were in charge need to be held accountable. They knew, and they hid it, and I think people need to be held responsible."

==== Caroline Nolan ====
Caroline Nolan said because of abuse in Beechwood, she "withdrew within myself" and "as I got older, I had very bad anger issues".

==== "D37" ====
"D37" said Beechwood staff "picked out boys to be gagged" and sexually abused. He said he was raped there and "forced to participate in masturbation competitions with other boys and members of staff on multiple occasions", which he assumed "was normal".

==== "L17" ====
"L17" from Nottingham suffered racist abuse and was "restrained" violently, and other staff knew about it. One staff member sexually abused her and was later sacked from Beechwood for his sexual relationship with a former resident.

She "knew something wasn't right" with his sexual abuse. Her hope was that by obeying him she "would be allowed to go home".

==== "C21" ====
"C21" was sexually assaulted in a shower and on another occasion raped, by a care worker.

He was too frightened to report the crimes and said, "For years I blamed myself". After his time in Beechwood, he struggled for many years with drug and alcohol addiction.

==== "L45" ====
"L45" was visited and assaulted in Beechwood multiple times by a man who had previously repeatedly raped her in her foster home, having abused her there from the age of 11.

She had been moved to Beechwood to protect her from his abuse. When she reported his abusive visits, the visits simply continued as before. Andris Logins also sexually abused her.

==== Unnamed victim ====
A man who was sexually assaulted twice in Beechwood as an 11-year-old boy by an older "bigger and physically stronger" child in the early 2000s said he was "terrorised" by older children daily.

He said Beechwood was "just a horrible place to be in" and "I never wanted to stay there. I was always finding places to run off."

Despite reporting the abuse, he was too frightened to press charges because he feared being moved to a care home much further from his mother as a result. The abusive child continued living in the bedroom next door and the victim was still transferred to a different care home anyway.

== Investigations ==
Child abuse in Beechwood was eventually investigated by both the Independent Inquiry into Child Sexual Abuse (IICSA) and police.

=== Independent Inquiry into Child Sexual Abuse ===
As part of its investigations into historical child abuse nationwide, the Independent Inquiry into Child Sexual Abuse (IICSA) examined abuse in Beechwood from 1967 until it closed in 2006. 136 former residents contacted the inquiry to report being abused in Beechwood, which police believe is "the small tip of a very large iceberg".

==== IICSA Report ====
In July 2019, the IICSA published a report on historical child sexual abuse that severely criticised Beechwood.

It described Beechwood staff as "threatening and violent", with their sexual acts against children being "tolerated or overlooked, allowing abusers to thrive". It found that only two sexual abuse allegations in Beechwood led to disciplinary action and this action was "inadequate". It criticised the "serious failure of scrutiny and governance" by county councillors in how they "did not question the scale of sexual abuse or what action was being taken".

One victim, David Robinson, said "things should have been addressed decades ago, at the time when children were being abused" and was "astonished" to discover "that people who were put in a position of trust abused that trust, and were being paid for it".

The leader of Nottingham City Council David Mellen, himself a witness to the inquiry, said Beechwood should have been closed earlier and the council "let some young people down".

=== Police operations ===
From 2010, Nottinghamshire Police launched dedicated police operations to investigate historical abuse in Beechwood and throughout the Nottinghamshire care system.

==== Operation Daybreak ====
Operation Daybreak began in 2011 in response to reports of child abuse in Beechwood. Its suspects included serial rapist Andris Logins and the operation led to his conviction and imprisonment in 2016.

The Independent Inquiry into Child Sexual Abuse criticised Operation Daybreak for its "lack of urgency" and under-resourcing from 2011 to 2015. It said "senior police officers should have done more to support" it, "valuable time was lost" and "these failings had consequences for the children involved". The Chief Constable of Nottinghamshire Police from February 2017 Craig Guildford agreed "the number of police officers had reduced considerably" during those years because of "resourcing issues". He said the understaffing predated 2017 and that since his appointment the investigation "has been resourced" and "is a priority".

==== Operation Equinox ====
Operation Equinox began in 2010 to investigate historical child abuse across the Nottinghamshire care system. The investigation led to the conviction and imprisonment of several offenders including Beechwood sex offender Barrie Pick.

== Sentences ==
Perpetrator	Conviction(s)	Sentence
Andris Logins	Raping an under-14 (two counts), raping an under-16 (two counts), indecently assaulting an under-16 (seven counts), indecently assaulting a 14-year-old, child cruelty	20 years
John Dent	Rape of a child, indecently assaulting three children	7 years
Barrie Pick	Indecently assaulting a child (2 counts), indecency with a child (2 counts), possession of indecent images of children (6 counts)	6 years
Helen Logins	Accessing victims' confidential care records (6 counts)	1 year suspended

=== Andris Logins ===
Beechwood carer Andris Logins was jailed on 23 March 2016 for 20 years for sexually abusing teenage girls and boys there from 1981 to 1985.

One victim, who was sent to Beechwood in the 1980s as a 12 years old girl, having already suffered previously sexual abuse, said Andris Logins was known by other girls in Beechwood as "a pervert" who wore "really tight trousers in which his privates was on show" and often silently watched the girls. He groomed her by adopting a friendly demeanour and giving her "special privileges" including cigarettes and a different bedroom. He sexually abused her on multiple occasions, beginning when she became separated from the other children during a trip to the woods. When another child saw one of these sexual assaults, the victim ran away from Beechwood to her mother's house because she was afraid of being punished. Upon her return, she was told that Logins' crime was "being dealt with" and within weeks she was simply moved to another care home. It was years after her reporting the crime that police finally contacted her. She said, "It's made me really over-protective of my children. I'll live with this for the rest of my life. I'm still quite an angry person inside."

A female victim who testified at his 2016 trial said Logins' abuse caused her severe anxiety and "constant" panic attacks. She said "You live with it day in, day out. I feel like I'm doing a life sentence here. He wasn't a carer. He was just nothing more than an abuser."

His child cruelty conviction was for dragging a 14-year-old boy into his office, punching him so badly that the boy "cowed on the floor", making him strip, then ogling his penis. He said "All I remember is crying, thinking to myself why is he doing it to me? Every day is now a challenge to get up. I'm off work at the moment with stress. I drink every day, cry most days. It was wrong, evil."

His trial was told Logins also took a photograph of another care worker burning a boy with a cigarette and wrote on it: "Childcare at its best".

Logins was originally investigated in 1990 after reports of him sexually assaulting girls in a different home. When the investigation concluded in 1991, he faced no action and was allowed to resume working there, with no assessment of whether he might be a danger. He was eventually investigated again because of reports in 2010 of abuse in Beechwood and was arrested in 2013.

Judge James Sampson admonished the "grave breach of trust" and called Beechwood "a home from hell". He told Logins "You were compliant in physical violence, you dished it out in a sadistic fashion" to children "powerless to do anything about it".

The leader of Nottinghamshire County Council, Alan Rhodes welcomed the 20-year sentence and apologised for how the council "failed in our duty of care", adding "it was our role to keep children safe and we clearly didn't". Rhodes praised the victims' "bravery, courage and persistence".

Detective Superintendent Adrian Pearson called the sentencing "a very significant moment for [Logins'] victims" for whom "the past few years have not been easy" because "they have had to relive these harrowing and life-shaping events."

Andris Logins can seek parole after 10 years. He was banned from unsupervised contact with under-16s or any work with children upon his release and he was permanently added to the Sex Offenders' Register.

==== Helen Logins ====
Helen Logins, wife of Andris Logins, received a suspended 1-year sentence in April 2016 for abusing her managerial position in Nottingham City Council by unlawfully accessing his victims' case files and social care records.

As a manager in the city council's "children and adolescent mental health service team", she searched for this confidential data on the council's computers. This intrusive violation caused one victim "sleepless nights".

Helen Logins pleaded guilty to six counts of the offence. Judge James Sampson imposed a concurrent 1-year sentence for each, suspended for 1½ years. He described her crime as a "gross breach of trust".

The city council sacked her for the offence in June 2015, calling it "a significant breach of professional and ethical standards".

=== John Dent ===
On 25 January 2002, John Dent received a seven-year prison sentence for 11 sexual offences against four children in Nottinghamshire care homes, some of which he committed in Beechwood's Enderleigh unit where he was second in command. He was permanently added to the Sex Offenders' Register.

When one girl in Beechwood defied him by not skipping at exercise time, because Dent was watching the movement of her breasts, he retaliated by forcing her to scrub a floor and locked her inside a "punishment room" with barred windows and only a mattress for sleeping. He later sexually assaulted her. He also took another 15-year-old girl to his parents' house where he had sex with her.

Judge John Hopkin admonished Dent as "an appalling case of a man who used his position to satisfy his own lust."

In October 2018, a woman known as "D7", who was in care in Beechwood in the 1970s, told the Independent Inquiry into Child Sexual Abuse (IICSA) that Dent sexually abused her "on several occasions", beginning with an assault in her own bed. She was "really, really scared" and it was decades before she found the courage to report it because she expected to be disbelieved.

=== Barrie Pick ===
On 6 December 2017, Barrie Pick received a six-year sentence for repeatedly sexually assaulting 13-year-old boy in Beechwood and a concurrent six-month sentence for possessing child pornography.

Pick had been a social worker there in the 1970s and the crimes began in 1977.

Detective Constable Richard Jones said: "Pick abused his position of authority at the children's home to target this boy. He should have been ensuring the children under his care were given the best possible start in life, instead he subjected this boy to these horrendous offences." Detective Jones praised the victim's courage in reporting it.
