= Peter Gregory =

Peter Gregory may refer to:

- Peter Gregory (doctor), team doctor for the England cricket team
- Peter H. Gregory, American computer security writer
- Peter Gregory (footballer) (born 1992), English footballer
- Eric Craven Gregory (1887–1959), also known as Peter Gregory, British publisher and arts benefactor
- Peter Gregory (academic), professor at the University of Reading
- Peter Gregory (Silicon Valley), a television character
