= Chatham & Clarendon Grammar School =

Location
- Ramsgate, Kent, CT11 7PS; England; 51°20′11.61″N 1°24′58.21″E

Information
- Type: Grammar school; Academy
- Religious affiliation: None
- Established: 1797; 229 years ago
- Founder: Dr William Humble
- Local authority: Kent
- Department for Education URN: 136382 Tables
- Ofsted: Reports
- Chair: Mr John Waker
- Head teacher: Ben Chidwick (Interim)
- Gender: Coeducational
- Age: 11 to 18
- Enrolment: 1334
- Houses: Knight-Heath; Mann-Somerville; Rothschild-Pearce; Thomas-Sharman
- Website: www.ccgrammarschool.co.uk

Chatham & Clarendon Grammar School is a co-educational grammar school in Ramsgate, Kent, England, formed as a result of the merger of the boys-only Chatham House Grammar School and girls-only Clarendon House Grammar School in September 2011.

The school is based across three main sites. The Chatham House site for lower school students, the Clarendon House site for upper school students, and the Sixth Form Centre site for sixth form students. Students regularly have lessons across all three sites.

== History ==
=== Chatham House ===
Chatham House was founded in 1796 by William Humble at 5 Love Lane, later renamed Chatham Street, although there is evidence that the school had existed prior to its formal establishment in a room behind the Post Office in the High Street. The school underwent major changes during the 19th century. The buildings were renovated and expanded, rugby and hockey were also introduced into the sporting programme.

==== World War II ====
When Ramsgate was bombed during World War II, a bomb hit the school library (where a skylight now stands) but did not detonate. Prior to that, the library had been the school chapel, as evidenced by the amount of stained glass windows situated quite high up.

The school had numerous entrances to private shelters used in the second world war to shelter from air raids. Most of these entrances were covered up (now underneath the playing fields) but the last ones are still visible on the lower playground and have been used recently by the local fire authorities for training purposes.

In a carpark of the school there is also a slabbed-over entrance to the Ramsgate A.R.P. tunnels, which ran for around 3.5 miles. These are not connected to the school shelters.

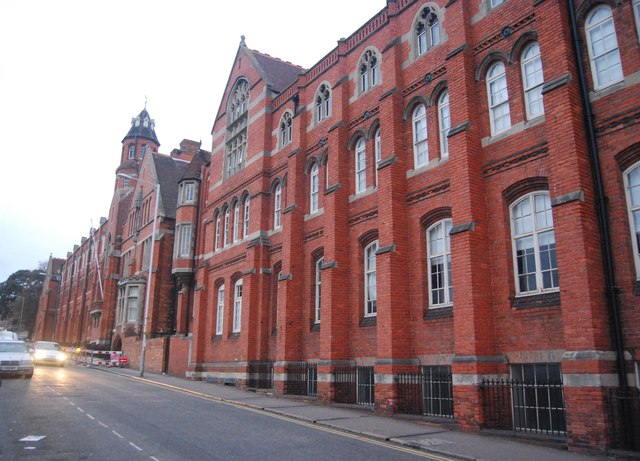
Exterior of Chatham House

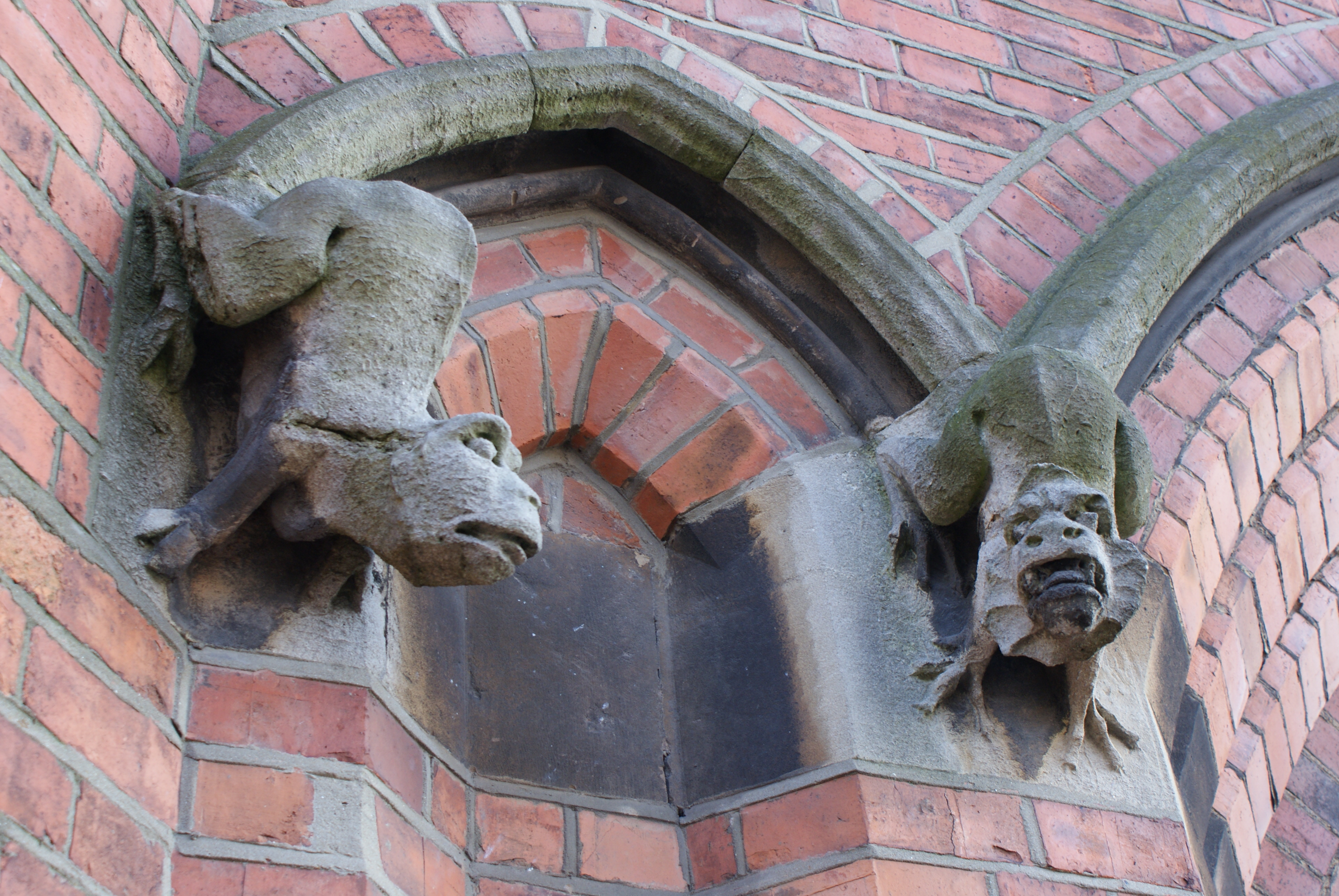
A pair of Grotesques; characteristic of the school's Gothic Revival style architecture.

The main building of the school as well as the railings were grade II listed.

From June 2 1940, both girls' and boys' schools were moved to Stafford; the boys moved to the King Edward VI School and the Technical School, and the girls moved to Stafford High School and the Technical School. These are now King Edward VI High School, Stafford. The girls were also taught at Baswich House, in Weeping Cross, later the headquarters of Staffordshire Police. The boys left at the end of October 1944, and the girls left in mid-December 1944.

== Merger ==
The two schools had often partnered with each other for extra-curricular activities and field trips. Both schools were single sex until sixth form, then allowing both male and female students. At sixth form, some AS and A level subjects were taught jointly by both schools; or by one school, however Clarendon House was unsubscribed.

The two schools federated in January 2011 to become a converter academy. bringing greater control over admissions, site & buildings and curriculum development as well as additional income. In this intermediate stage, Year 9 was moved to the lower school while the decisions about the sites were being taken. House systems were merged based on student voting.

Following an Ofsted assessment in 2025, the school progressed from a diamond model to fully coeducational classes.

== Academics ==
Virtually all maintained schools and academies follow the National Curriculum, and are inspected by Ofsted on how well they succeed in delivering a 'broad and balanced curriculum'. Schools endeavour to get all students to achieve the English Baccalaureate (EBACC) qualification- this must include core subjects, a modern or ancient foreign language, and either History or Geography. Schools are obliged to publish the philosophy governing their curriculum on their website.

=== Key Stage 3 (Years 7–9) ===
Key stage 3 is taught on the Chatham House site. Within KS3, all students study in mixed-sex classes with some ability setting in Mathematics and within the Year 9 Science syllabus.

All students study English, Mathematics, Science, Design & Food Technology, Geography, History, Art, Computer Science, Physical Education & Games, Religion and Philosophy, Music, Drama and PSHE. In Year 7 all students study French, as well as Spanish in years 8 and 9. Design & Food Technology covers Product Design, Catering, and 3D/Graphical Design.

=== Key Stage 4 GCSE (Years 10–11) ===
This schools offers a variety of GCSE-Level qualifications. All students take core subjects, whilst also selecting others from their preference with the requirement of taking at least one language and one humanity.

==== Core Subjects ====
Subject	Exam Board	Notes
English Language	Pearson Edexcel	
English Literature	Pearson Edexcel	
Mathematics	Pearson Edexcel	(higher ability students will also take the AQA Level 2 Certificate in Further Mathematics)
Sciences	AQA	(most students take the Combined Science (Double Award), whilst the higher-ability students take all three separate sciences (Biology, Chemistry, and Physics), known as "triple science")

==== Option Subjects ====
Subject	Exam Board
Art and Design	AQA
Business Studies	AQA
Computer Science	OCR
Design and Technology	AQA
Drama	AQA
French	AQA
Food Preparation and Nutrition	Eduqas
Geography	AQA
Health and Social Care	AQA
History	AQA
Physical Education	Pearson Edexcel
Product Design	AQA
Religious Studies	AQA
Spanish	AQA

All students by default will take the Higher Tier option of their GCSE course, with the Foundation Tier option available.

Students must select four options, including at least one language and at least one humanities subject (Geography, History, Religious Studies).

=== Key Stage 5 (Years 12–13) ===
The Sixth Form at this school offers 25 A-Level courses and 6 vocational courses. Sixth Form students may choose to study 3 or 4 courses.

Qualification	Qualification Type	Awarding Body
Applied Science	Level 3 Certificate and Extended Certificate	AQA
Art and Design	Advanced Level	AQA
Biology	Advanced Level	AQA
Business Studies	Advanced Level	Pearson Edexcel
Business	Pearson BTEC Level 3 National Certificate	Pearson Edexcel
Chemistry A	Advanced Level	OCR
Computer Science	Advanced Level	OCR
Design and Technology: Product Design	Advanced Level	AQA
Drama and Theatre	Advanced Level	AQA
Economics	Advanced Level	AQA
English Literature	Advanced Level	AQA
Film Studies	Advanced Level	OCR
French	Advanced Level	Pearson Edexcel
Further Mathematics	Advanced Level	Pearson Edexcel
Geography	Advanced Level	AQA
Health and Social Care (2016 Suite)	Level 3 Cambridge Technical Extended Certificate (360 guided learning hours) OR Level 3 Cambridge Technical Diploma (720 guided learning hours, known as 'double' H&SC)	OCR
History	Advanced Level	Pearson Edexcel
Information Technology	Pearson BTEC Level 3 National Certificate OR Pearson BTEC Level 3 National Extended Certificate	Pearson Edexcel
Mathematics	Advanced Level	Pearson Edexcel
Media Studies	Advanced Level	OCR
Music	Advanced Level	Eduqas
Music Technology	Advanced Level	Pearson Edexcel
Philosophy and Ethics	Advanced Level	OCR
Physics	Advanced Level	OCR
Politics	Advanced Level	AQA
Psychology	Advanced Level	AQA
Sociology	Advanced Level	AQA
Spanish	Advanced Level	AQA
Sport and Physical Activity	Level 3 Cambridge Technical Diploma	OCR
Travel and Tourism	Pearson BTEC Level 3 National Extended Certificate	Pearson Edexcel

==== Entry requirements ====
In order for a student to study three or four Advanced Level subjects, they must achieve at least 5x Grade 6s at GCSE. In order for a student to study a double Level 3 Vocational course, and one or two Advanced Levels, they must achieve at least 3x Grade 5s and 2x Grade 6s a GCSE. Where relevant, a student will need a Grade 6 in a subject to study the same subject at the Sixth Form. Students are expected to continue their chosen subjects until the end of Year 13.

There are special rules or exceptions for subject options for students. Students must achieve a Grade 7 in Mathematics at GCSE to study it at Advanced Level, and a Grade 8 in Mathematics at GCSE to study Further Mathematics at Advanced Level.

Students studying Further Mathematics will normally undertake the Mathematics Advanced Level exams at the end of Year 12.

== Notable alumni ==
- Iain Aitch – Author and journalist
- Herbert William Allingham – Surgeon to the Household of King Edward VII, and surgeon in ordinary to the Prince of Wales (later King George V)
- Allan Butler – Ambassador to Mongolia from 1984 to 1987
- Patrick Crawford – Commandant from 1989 to 1993 of the Royal Army Medical College
- Jamie Davies – Racing driver
- Matt Dunn – Romantic comedy novelist
- Marc Gascoigne – Fantasy writer
- Peter Gregory (academic) – Director since 2005 of the Scottish Crop Research Institute at Invergowrie near Dundee, and Professor of Soil Science from 1994–2005 at the University of Reading
- Geoffrey Colin Guy – Governor of Saint Helena from 1976 to 1981, and Commissioner of the Turks and Caicos Islands from 1958 to 1959 and 1959–1965
- Edward Heath – Prime Minister of the United Kingdom from 1970 to 1974
- Stewart Jackson – Conservative MP for Peterborough from 2005 to 2017
- Sean Kerly – Olympic field hockey player
- Claire Kohda – Writer and violinist
- Marc Lawrence – Sea King observer of 849 Naval Air Squadron, killed on 21 March 2003 in a crash in Kuwait
- John Marek – Labour MP for Wrexham from 1983–2001
- Frank Muir – Humourist
- Edward Norman – Gave the BBC Reith Lecture in 1978
- John Ovenden – Labour MP for Gravesend from 1974 to 1979 and Leader of Kent County Council from 1994 to 1997
- Geoff Parsons – Olympic high jumper
- Charles Robson – Middlesex and Hampshire wicket-keeper, and secretary (manager) of Southampton Football Club
- Robert Tavernor – Emeritus professor of architecture and urban design at the London School of Economics (LSE)
- Peter Terry – Station commander from 1968 to 1970 of RAF El Adem (in Libya) and Governor of Gibraltar from 1985 to 1989.
- Nik Turner – Founder of the space rock band Hawkwind
- Gregory James Venables – Archbishop of South America since 2001
- Bill Wratten – Air Officer Commanding-in-Chief of RAF Strike Command during the first Gulf War, station commander from 1980 to 1982 of RAF Coningsby
