= Edward Heath =

Prime Minister of the United Kingdom from 1970 to 1974

The Right Honourable Sir Edward Heath KG MBE
- Portrait by Allan Warren, 1987

Prime Minister of the United Kingdom
- In office 19 June 1970 – 4 March 1974
- Monarch: Elizabeth II
- Preceded by: Harold Wilson
- Succeeded by: Harold Wilson

Leader of the Opposition
- In office 4 March 1974 – 11 February 1975
- Monarch: Elizabeth II
- Prime Minister: Harold Wilson
- Preceded by: Harold Wilson
- Succeeded by: Margaret Thatcher
- In office 28 July 1965 – 19 June 1970
- Monarch: Elizabeth II
- Prime Minister: Harold Wilson
- Deputy: Reginald Maudling
- Preceded by: Alec Douglas-Home
- Succeeded by: Harold Wilson

Leader of the Conservative Party
- In office 28 July 1965 – 11 February 1975
- Deputy: Reginald Maudling (1965–1972)
- Preceded by: Alec Douglas-Home
- Succeeded by: Margaret Thatcher
Ministerial offices
President of the Board of Trade
In office 20 October 1963 – 16 October 1964
Prime Minister	Alec Douglas-Home
Preceded by	Fred Erroll
Succeeded by	Douglas Jay
Secretary of State for Industry, Trade and Regional Development
In office 20 October 1963 – 16 October 1964
Prime Minister	Alec Douglas-Home
Preceded by	Office established
Succeeded by	Office abolished
Lord Keeper of the Privy Seal (Deputy Foreign Secretary)
In office 14 February 1960 – 20 October 1963
Prime Minister	Harold Macmillan
Preceded by	The Viscount Hailsham
Succeeded by	Selwyn Lloyd
Minister of Labour
In office 14 October 1959 – 27 July 1960
Prime Minister	Harold Macmillan
Preceded by	Iain Macleod
Succeeded by	John Hare
Government Chief Whip in the House of Commons; Parliamentary Secretary to the Treasury
In office 30 December 1955 – 14 October 1959
Prime Minister	Anthony Eden; Harold Macmillan
Deputy	Martin Redmayne
Preceded by	Patrick Buchan-Hepburn
Succeeded by	Martin Redmayne
Government Deputy Chief Whip in the House of Commons
In office 28 May 1952 – 30 December 1955
Prime Minister	Winston Churchill; Anthony Eden
Preceded by	Harry Mackeson
Succeeded by	Martin Redmayne
Lord Commissioner of the Treasury
In office 7 November 1951 – 30 December 1955
Prime Minister	Winston Churchill; Anthony Eden
Preceded by	William Wilkins
Succeeded by	Edward Wakefield
Shadow cabinet offices
Shadow Chancellor of the Exchequer
In office 16 February 1965 – 28 July 1965
Leader	Alec Douglas-Home
Preceded by	Reginald Maudling
Succeeded by	Iain Macleod
Parliamentary offices
Father of the House of Commons
In office 9 April 1992 – 14 May 2001
Preceded by	Bernard Braine
Succeeded by	Tam Dalyell

Member of Parliament
- In office 23 February 1950 – 14 May 2001
- Preceded by: Ashley Bramall
- Succeeded by: Derek Conway
- Constituency: Bexley (1950–1974); Sidcup (1974–1983); Old Bexley and Sidcup (1983–2001)

Personal details
- Born: Edward Richard George Heath; 9 July 1916 Broadstairs, Kent, England
- Died: 17 July 2005 (aged 89) Salisbury, Wiltshire, England
- Resting place: Salisbury Cathedral
- Party: Conservative
- Education: Balliol College, Oxford
- Occupation: Civil servant; musician; politician; yachtsman
- Civilian awards: Order of the Garter

Military service
- Branch/service: British Army
- Rank: Lieutenant colonel
- Unit: Royal Artillery; Honourable Artillery Co.
- Battles/wars: Second World War
- Military awards: Mentioned in dispatches; Order of the British Empire
- Service number: 179215

Sir Edward Richard George Heath (9 July 1916 – 17 July 2005) was a British statesman who served as Prime Minister of the United Kingdom from 1970 to 1974 and Leader of the Conservative Party from 1965 to 1975. Heath also served as a Member of Parliament (MP) from 1950 to 2001. Outside politics, Heath was a yachtsman, musician and author.

Heath was born in Broadstairs, Kent to a chambermaid and a carpenter. He became a leader within student politics whilst studying PPE at Balliol College, Oxford. During World War II, Heath served with distinction in the Royal Artillery. Afterward, Heath briefly joined the civil service but resigned to stand for Parliament, and was elected for Bexley at the 1950 election. He was promoted to Chief Whip by Anthony Eden in 1955, and stayed in the cabinet of Harold Macmillan as Minister of Labour and Lord Privy Seal, as well as that of Alec Douglas-Home as President of the Board of Trade. After the Conservatives were defeated at the 1964 election, Heath was elected to succeed Douglas-Home in 1965 as party leader and Leader of the Opposition. Although he led the Conservatives to a landslide defeat to Labour's Harold Wilson at the 1966 election, Heath remained as leader, and in 1970 his party won an unexpected victory.

During his tenure, Heath oversaw the decimalisation of British coinage in 1971, and a sweeping reform of local government in 1972. He also successfully negotiated British entry into the European Economic Community (EEC). However, his premiership also coincided with heightened violence during the Troubles in Northern Ireland, in response to which he imposed direct rule and approved internment without trial. Unofficial talks with Provisional Irish Republican Army delegates broke down, as did the Sunningdale Agreement of 1973, which led the MPs of the Ulster Unionist Party to resign the Conservative whip. Heath's attempts to deregulate the economy, to reform British trade unionism with the unpopular Industrial Relations Act, and to transition from direct to indirect taxation, such as with the introduction of value-added tax in 1973, were undermined by a miners' strike at the start of 1974 that severely damaged the Government. In response, Heath introduced a Three-Day Week to conserve energy and called an election for February 1974 in an attempt to obtain a mandate to face down the miners' wage demands. Instead, the result was a hung parliament, with the Conservatives losing their majority. Despite receiving fewer votes, the Labour Party had four more seats than the Conservatives, and Heath resigned as Prime Minister on 4 March after talks with the Liberal Party to form a coalition government failed.

After losing a second successive election to Wilson in October 1974, Heath's leadership of the party was challenged by his former Education Secretary, Margaret Thatcher. On 4 February 1975, she unexpectedly outpolled him in the first round of votes. Heath withdrew from the race and returned to the backbenches. Although he campaigned with Thatcher for the successful "yes" side of the 1975 referendum on British membership in the EEC, Heath would become an embittered critic during her time as prime minister, speaking and writing against the policies of Thatcherism. Following the 1992 election, he became Father of the House, until his retirement from the Commons in 2001. Heath died in 2005, aged 89. He has been described by the BBC as "the first working-class meritocrat" to become Conservative leader in "the party's modern history" and "a One Nation Tory in the Disraeli tradition who rejected the laissez-faire capitalism that Thatcher would enthusiastically endorse."

== Early life ==
Edward Richard George Heath was born at 54 Albion Road, Broadstairs, Kent, on 9 July 1916, the son of William George Heath, a carpenter who built airframes for Vickers during the First World War, and was subsequently employed as a builder and Edith Anne Heath (née Pantony), a lady's maid. His father was later a successful small businessman after taking over a building and decorating firm. Heath's paternal grandfather had run a small dairy business, and when that failed worked as a porter at Broadstairs Station on the Southern Railway. Edward was four years old when his younger brother, John, was born; there was no question that Edward was the "favoured brother". Heath was known as "Teddy" as a young man. He was educated at Chatham House Grammar School in Ramsgate, and in 1935 with the aid of a county scholarship he went up to study at Balliol College, Oxford.

In later years, Heath's peculiar accent, with its "strangulated" vowel sounds, combined with his non-Standard pronunciation of "l" as "w" and "out" as "eout", was satirised by Monty Python in the audio sketch "Teach Yourself Heath" (released on a 7" flexi-disc single included with initial copies of their 1972 LP Monty Python's Previous Record). Heath's biographer John Campbell speculates that his speech, unlike that of his father and younger brother, who both spoke with Kent accents, must have undergone "drastic alteration on encountering Oxford", although retaining elements of Kent speech.

== Oxford ==
A talented musician, Heath won the college's organ scholarship in his first term (he had previously tried for the organ scholarships at St Catharine's College, Cambridge, and Keble College, Oxford) which enabled him to stay at the university for a fourth year; he eventually graduated with a Second Class Honours BA in Philosophy, politics and economics in 1939.

While at university Heath became active in Conservative Party politics. On the key political issue of the day, foreign policy, he opposed the Conservative-dominated government of the day ever more openly. His first Paper Speech (i.e. a major speech listed on the Order Paper along with the visiting guest speakers) at the Oxford Union, in 1936, was in opposition to the appeasement of Germany by returning her colonies, confiscated during the First World War.

In June 1937 Heath was elected President of the Oxford University Conservative Association as a pro-Spanish Republic candidate, in opposition to the pro-Franco John Stokes (himself later a Conservative MP). In 1937–38 Heath was chairman of the national Federation of University Conservative Associations, and in the same year (his third at university) he was Secretary and then Librarian of the Oxford Union. At the end of the year he was defeated for the Presidency of the Oxford Union by another Balliol candidate, Alan Wood, on the issue of whether the Chamberlain government should give way to a left-wing Popular Front. On that occasion, Heath supported the government.

In his final year Heath was the president of Balliol College's Junior Common Room, an office held in subsequent years by his near-contemporaries Denis Healey, who would become a lifelong friend and political rival and Roy Jenkins, and as such was invited to support the Master of Balliol Alexander Lindsay, who stood as an anti-appeasement 'Independent Progressive' candidate against the official Conservative candidate, Quintin Hogg, in the 1938 Oxford by-election.

Heath, who had himself applied to be the Conservative candidate for the by-election, accused the government in an October Union Debate of "turning all four cheeks" to Adolf Hitler, and was elected as President of the Oxford Union in November 1938, sponsored by Balliol, after winning the Presidential Debate that "This House has No Confidence in the National Government as presently constituted". He was thus President in Hilary term 1939; the visiting Leo Amery described him in his diaries as "a pleasant youth".

As an undergraduate, Heath travelled widely in Europe. His opposition to appeasement was nourished by his witnessing first-hand a Nuremberg rally in 1937, where he met leading Nazis Hermann Göring, Joseph Goebbels, and Heinrich Himmler at an SS cocktail party. He later described Himmler as "the most evil man I have ever met". He was in Germany for two months to learn German but did not keep up any fluency in the language in later life. In 1938 he visited Barcelona, then under attack from Spanish Nationalist forces during the Spanish Civil War. On one occasion a car in which he was travelling came under machine-gun fire, while on another a bomb hit his hotel whilst he was observing an air raid from outside. In the summer of 1939, accompanied by his Jewish friend Madron Seligman, he travelled to Danzig and Poland. They made the return journey by hitchhiking and rail across Germany through mobilising troops, returning to Britain just before the declaration of war.

== Second World War ==
Heath spent late 1939 and early 1940 on a debating tour of the United States before being called up. On 22 March 1941, he received an emergency commission as a second lieutenant in the Royal Artillery. During the war he initially served with heavy anti-aircraft guns around Liverpool (which suffered heavy German bombing raids in May 1941) and by early 1942 was regimental adjutant, with the substantive rank of captain.

Heath participated as an adjutant in the Normandy landings, where he met Maurice Schumann, French Foreign Minister under Pompidou. As a temporary major commanding a battery of his own, he provided artillery support during the Allied campaigns in France and Germany in 1944–45, for which he received a mention in despatches on 8 November 1945.

Heath later remarked that "[it's] one thing to be in the war, and you see the enemy on the other side and so you bombard them, and then later on when you pass over their ground, you see dead bodies lying around". In September 1945 he commanded a firing squad that executed a Polish soldier convicted of rape and murder. He was appointed a Member of the Order of the British Empire, Military Division (MBE) on 24 January 1946. He was demobilised in August 1946 and promoted to the substantive rank of lieutenant-colonel on 1 May 1947.

Heath joined the Honourable Artillery Company as a lieutenant-colonel on 1 September 1951, in which he remained active throughout the 1950s, rising to commanding officer of 2 Regiment HAC; a portrait of him in full dress uniform still hangs in the Queens Room of the HAC's Armoury House. In April 1971, as prime minister, he wore his lieutenant-colonel's insignia to inspect troops.

== Post-war, 1945–1950 ==
Before the war, Heath had won a scholarship to Gray's Inn and had begun making preparations for a career at the Bar, but after the war he was placed in joint top position in the civil service examinations. He then became a civil servant in the Ministry of Civil Aviation (he was disappointed not to be posted to the Treasury, but declined an offer to join the Foreign Office, fearing that foreign postings might prevent him from entering politics).

Heath joined a team under Alison Munro tasked with drawing up a scheme for British airports using some of the many Second World War RAF bases, and was specifically charged with planning the home counties. Years later she attributed his evident enthusiasm for Maplin Airport to this work. Then much to the surprise of civil service colleagues, he sought adoption as the prospective parliamentary candidate for Bexley and resigned in November 1947.

After working as news editor of the Church Times from February 1948 to September 1949, Heath worked as a management trainee at the merchant bankers Brown, Shipley & Co. until his election as Member of Parliament (MP) for Bexley in the February 1950 general election. In the election he defeated an old contemporary from the Oxford Union, Ashley Bramall, by a margin of 133 votes.

== Early political career (1950–1965) ==
=== Member of Parliament ===
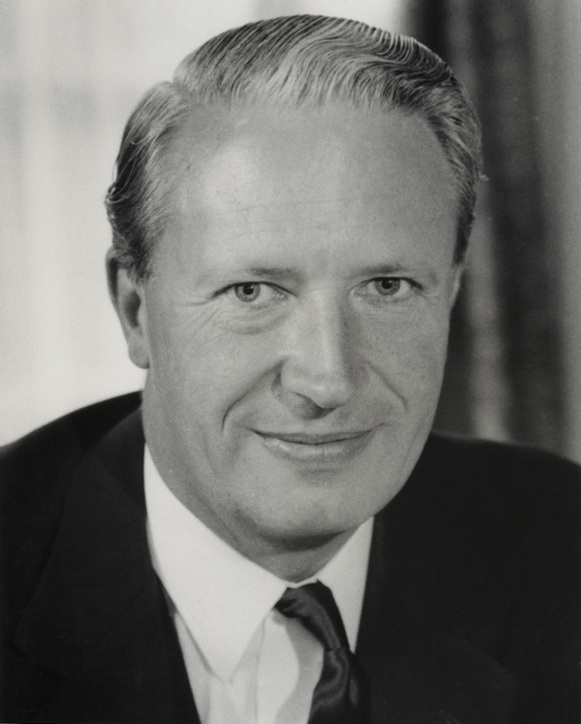
Official portrait, 1960

Heath made his maiden speech in the House of Commons on 26 June 1950, in which he appealed to the Labour government to participate in the Schuman Plan. As MP for Bexley, he gave enthusiastic speeches in support of the young candidate for neighbouring Dartford, Margaret Roberts, later Margaret Thatcher.

He was appointed as an opposition whip by Winston Churchill in February 1951. He remained in the whip's office after the Conservatives won the 1951 general election, rising rapidly to Joint Deputy Chief Whip, Deputy Chief Whip and, in December 1955, Government Chief Whip under Anthony Eden. Journalist Geoffrey Wheatcroft has observed that "Of all government jobs, this requires firmness and fairness allied to tact and patience and Heath's ascent seems baffling in hindsight".

=== In office ===
Due to the convention that whips did not speak in Parliament, Heath managed to keep out of the controversy over the Suez Crisis. On the announcement of Eden's resignation, Heath submitted a report on the opinions of the Conservative MPs regarding Eden's possible successors. This report favoured Harold Macmillan and helped to secure Macmillan the premiership in January 1957. Macmillan later appointed Heath Minister of Labour, a Cabinet Minister—as Chief Whip Heath had attended Cabinet, but had not been formally a member—after winning the October 1959 election.

In 1960 Macmillan appointed Heath Lord Privy Seal with responsibility for the negotiations to secure the UK's first attempt to join the European Communities (or Common Market, as it was then more widely known). After extensive negotiations, involving detailed agreements about the UK's agricultural trade with Commonwealth countries such as New Zealand, British entry was vetoed by the French President, Charles de Gaulle, at a press conference in January 1963 – much to the disappointment of Heath, who was a firm supporter of European common market membership for the United Kingdom. He oversaw a successful application when serving as prime minister a decade later.

Following this setback, a major humiliation for Macmillan's foreign policy, Heath was not a contender for the party leadership on Macmillan's retirement in October 1963. Under prime minister Alec Douglas-Home he was President of the Board of Trade and Secretary of State for Industry, Trade and Regional Development, and oversaw the abolition of retail price maintenance, as well as the move of the August Bank Holiday to extend the holiday season and reduce congestion.

== Leader of the Opposition (1965–1970) ==
=== Party leadership ===
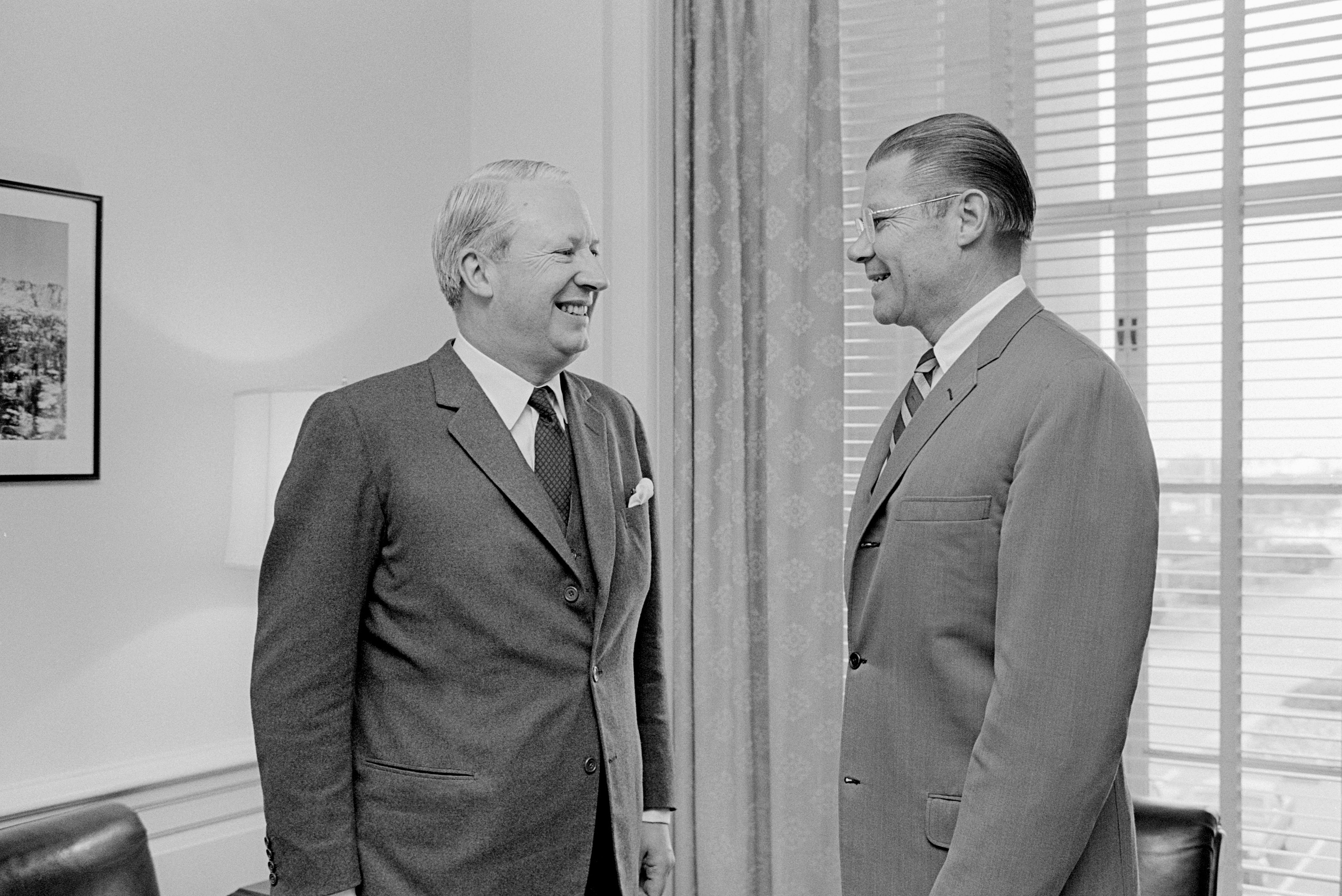
Heath at the Pentagon with US defense secretary Robert McNamara in 1966

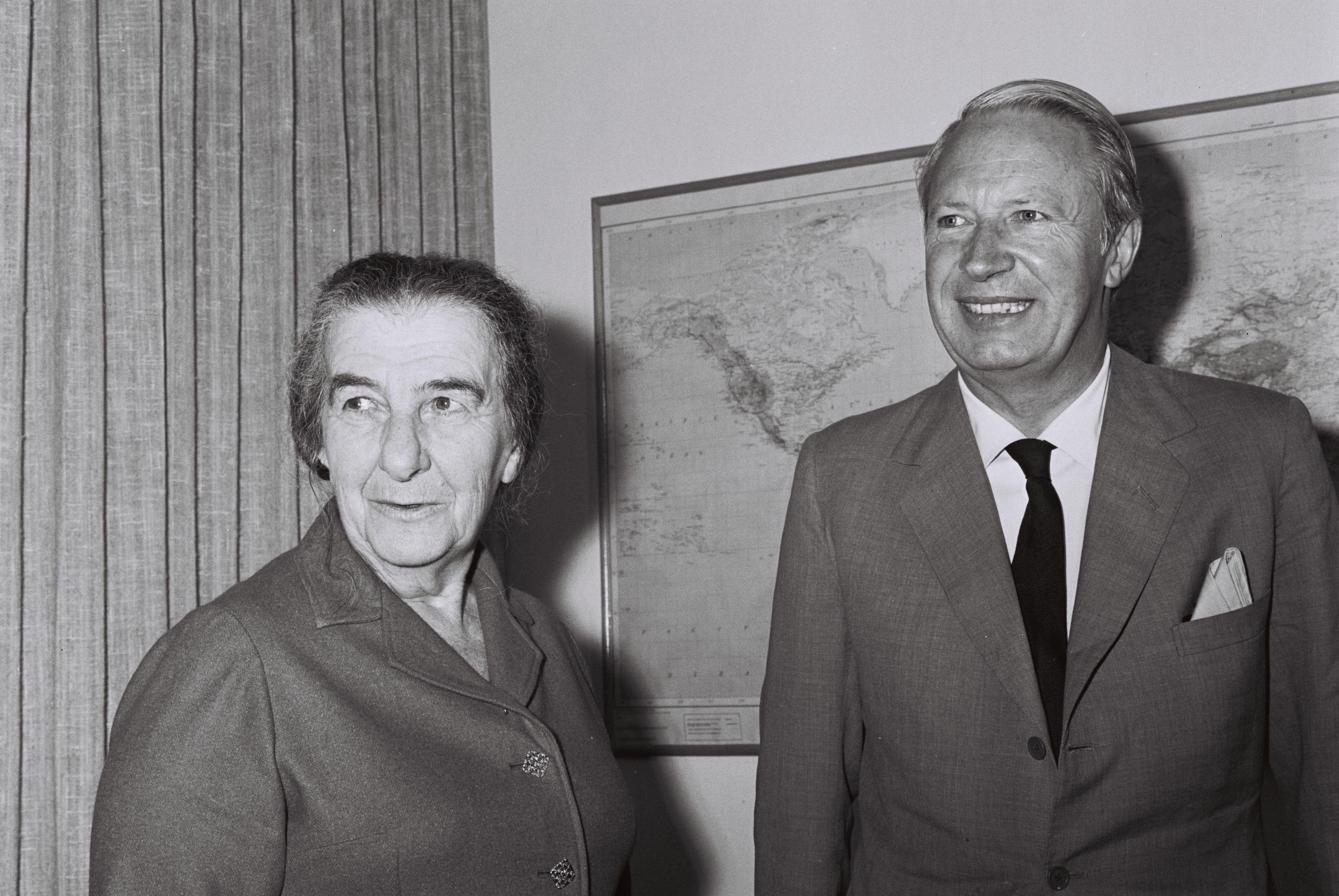
Heath with Israeli prime minister Golda Meir in 1969

After the Conservative Party lost the general election of 1964, the defeated Home changed the party leadership rules to allow for a ballot by MPs and then, in July 1965, he resigned. Heath—who was Shadow Chancellor at the time, and had recently won favourable publicity for leading the fight against Labour's Finance Bill—unexpectedly won the party's leadership contest, gaining 150 votes to Reginald Maudling's 133 and Enoch Powell's 15. Heath became the Conservatives' youngest leader and retained office following the party's defeat in the general election of 1966.

In April 1968 Enoch Powell made his controversial "Rivers of Blood" speech, which criticised immigration to the United Kingdom. Soon afterwards Heath telephoned Margaret Thatcher to inform her that he was going to sack Powell from the Shadow cabinet; she recalled that she "really thought that it was better to let things cool down for the present rather than heighten the crisis". The next day Heath sacked Powell. Several Conservatives on the right protested against Powell's sacking. According to Heath, he never spoke to Powell again.

=== 1970 election ===
With another general election approaching in 1970 a Conservative policy document emerged from the Selsdon Park Hotel that offered free-market–oriented policies as solutions to the country's unemployment and inflation problems. Heath stated that the Selsdon weekend only reaffirmed policies that had actually been evolving since he became leader of the Conservative Party. The Labour prime minister, Harold Wilson, thought the document a vote-loser and dubbed it the product of Selsdon Man – after the supposedly prehistoric Piltdown Man – to portray it as reactionary. Heath's Conservative Party won the general election of 1970 with 330 seats to Labour's 287. The new cabinet included the future prime minister Margaret Thatcher (Education and Science), William Whitelaw (Leader of the House of Commons) and the former prime minister Alec Douglas-Home (Foreign and Commonwealth Affairs).

== Premiership (1970–1974) ==
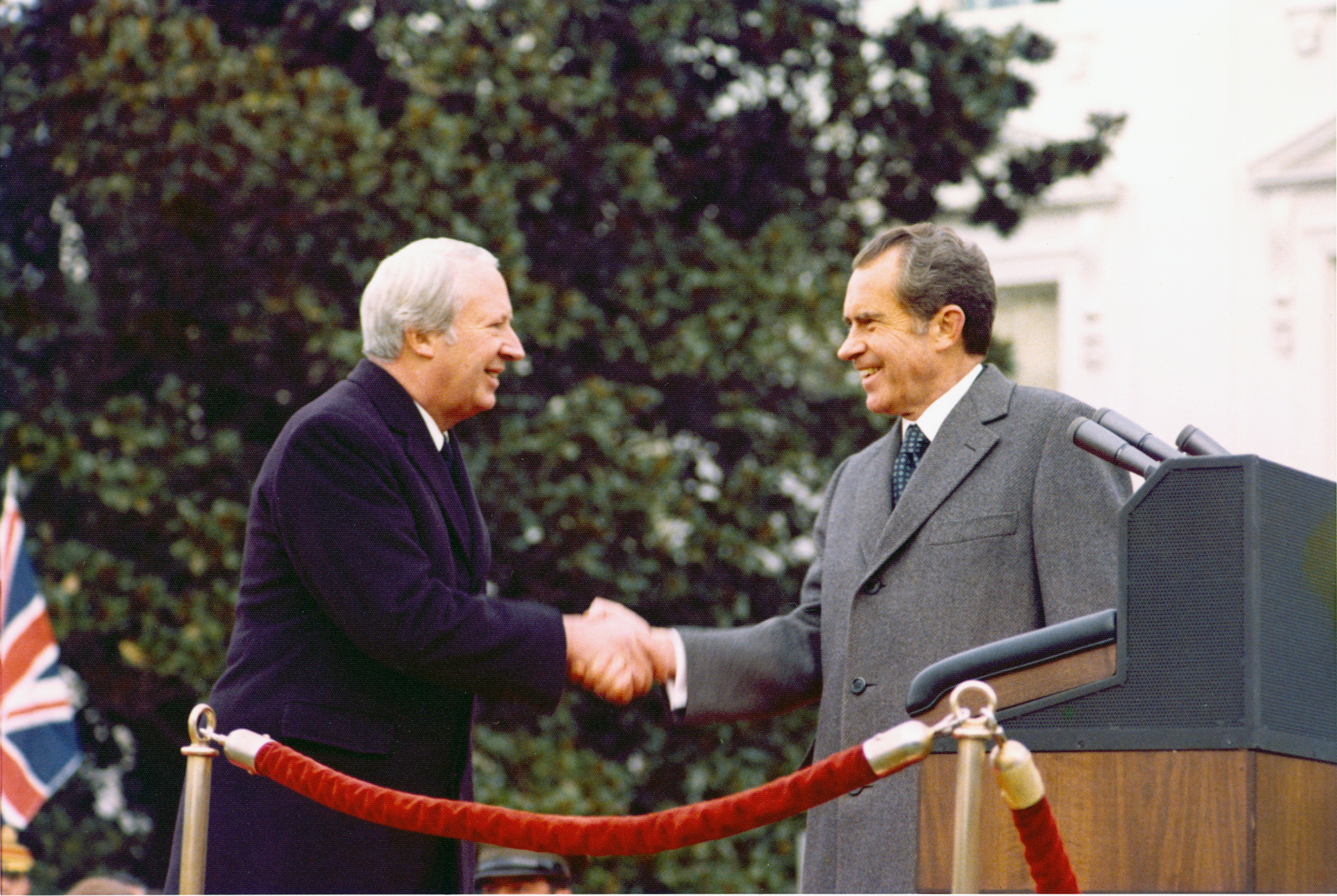
Heath with US president Richard Nixon at the White House in 1973

=== Welfare state ===
During Heath's first year in office, higher charges were introduced for benefits of the welfare state such as school meals, spectacles, dentistry, and prescriptions. Entitlement to State Sickness Benefit was also changed so that it would only be paid after the first three days of sickness. In 1971 a series of measures was introduced designed to limit the availability of supplementary benefit. In particular, as noted by one study, "tax rebates and strike pay were treated as resources, subject to a £4 disregard."

The Social Security Act of 1971 increased the financial penalty for leaving work or refusing a job without good cause, and also withdrew benefit for the first three days of unemployment and industrial injury. The same Act imposed a 40% reduction for voluntary unemployment. The 1971 Social Security Act also made provision for supplementary benefit to be automatically reduced for claimants disqualified for unemployment benefits and also (as noted by one study) "of all those claimants whose unemployment benefits are suspended while insurance officers investigate the circumstances of their leaving their jobs or being sacked."

In 1972, a procedure was introduced under which claimants from outside an area who had moved to that area in search of work had one week to find a job before being cut off. From April 1972 a man returning from work after being on strike had to pay back any supplementary benefit received to tide him over during the first 15 days at work before he got his pay. In February 1973, the rules about help in urgent cases were made more stringent. Also in regards to strikers, the Social Security Act of 1971 reduced the disregards (the normal sums, the principal strike payments and the tax refunds) that were disregarded in calculating the entitlement of a family to benefit. Also, from 3 April 1972 onwards, as noted by one MP

any payment for supplementary benefit made in the fortnight following a return to work is recoverable, normally by means of a deduction from pay by the employer. Further, supplementary benefit will not normally be paid in the first fortnight of a dispute when employees have their first week's wages and a week's "wages in hand" available to them. Nor is benefit paid to meet commitments incurred before a strike began, such as hire-purchase instalments, rent arrears or outstanding gas or electricity bills.

Noting the impact of the 1971 Social Security Act, one MP argued that

The Social Security Act, 1971, causes a great deal of misery and hardship within my area. It affects people who have been disqualified from benefit because they have left their job for no good reason, and other unfortunate people who have been charged with industrial misconduct. Industrial misconduct is hard to define but the unfortunate people who are charged with it find it extremely difficult to survive on the payments they receive under Section 1(2) of the Act. They now receive 40 per cent. less than do the people who are on supplementary benefit. Under the previous legislation there was a discount of 75p, but perhaps that amount was not considered by this Government to be a sufficient deterrent to people leaving their jobs. The application of a 40 per cent. reduction in the allowance given to these persons who have been refused unemployment benefit causes a great deal of hardship and misery.

Unemployment benefit refunds for 'waiting days' were also ended, as noted by one study:

Until 1971, benefit for the 'waiting days' was refunded if unemployment continued beyond twelve days. Single days can be combined if they fall within a period of thirteen weeks. For the supplementary earnings-related Benefit scheme, the waiting day period is twelve days. Before the Social Security Act 1971, unemployment benefit was refunded for any 'waiting days' if unemployment lasted for more than twelve days, but this is no longer available; the only possibility is to apply for emergency Supplementary Benefits during this period.

As a result of the squeeze in the education budget, the provision of free school milk was ended for 8- to 11-year-olds (it had already been ended for older children by Harold Wilson); the tabloid press christened Margaret Thatcher, the then Education Secretary as "Margaret Thatcher: Milk Snatcher".

Despite these measures, the Heath government encouraged a significant increase in welfare spending, and Thatcher blocked Macleod's other posthumous education policy: the abolition of the Open University, which had recently been founded by the preceding Labour government. In addition, despite the end of cheap milk provision, 700,000 school children remained entitled to free milk. The Legal Advice and Assistance Act 1972 provided for better facilities for advice and assistance at an early stage in a dispute. The Social Needs (Grants) Act 9NI) 1970 "made provision for the authorisation of the payment of grants towards expenditure incurred due to special social need in urban areas." From 1971 onwards, in regards to supplementary benefit, the requirements of a striker (his normal requirements) were disregarded in full.

In January 1973, the Criminal Justice Act 1972 came into effect in England and Wales. It extended the court's power "to order an offender to pay compensation for personal injury, loss, or damage." In June 1973 a new lower rate of attendance allowance was introduced for those aged 16 to 64, while lower rates "for the aged under 15 and those over 65 were introduced on 1 October and 3 December respectively." Another change allowed for small claims of less than £75 to be dealt with in a less formal manner within the County Court system. Rules of evidence and requirements of legal representation were relaxed to make it viable to claim such small sums under the County Court Act 1959 as amended by the Administration of Justice Act (E&W) 1973. The Land Compensation Act of 1973 "increased compensation for persons displaced by public development projects."

Provision was made under the National Insurance (Old Persons' and Widows' Pensions and Attendances Allowances) Act 1970 for pensions to be paid to old people who had been excluded from the pre-1948 pension schemes and were accordingly excluded from the comprehensive scheme that was introduced in 1948. About 100,000 people were affected by this change, half of whom were receiving Supplementary Benefit under the social security scheme. The Act also made improvements to the Widow's Pension scheme by introducing a scale that started at 30 shillings a week for women widowed at the age of 40 and rose to the full rate of £5 at the age of 50.

Considerable support was provided for nursery school building, and a long-term capital investment programme in school building was launched. A Family Fund was set up to assist families with children who had congenital conditions, while new benefits were introduced benefiting hundreds of thousands of disabled persons whose disabilities had been caused neither by war nor by industrial injury. An Attendance Allowance was introduced for those needing care at home, together with Invalidity Benefit for the long-term sick, while a higher Child Allowance was made available where invalidity allowance was paid. Widow's Benefits were introduced for those aged between forty and fifty years of age, improved subsidies for slum clearance were made available, while Rent Allowances were introduced for private tenants.

In April 1971, the right to education was given to all children with Down syndrome for the first time. The National Insurance (Married Women) Amendment Regulations 1971 extended the provisions of the National Insurance (Married Women) Regulations 1948. A change was also introduced under which the wives of invalidity pensioners were able to earn much more without losing benefit, while invalidity pensioners now received (as noted by one study) "the same specially higher rates of children's benefits as widows." A Home Office Circular from 1971 made arrangements (as noted by one study) "to increase the discretion of probation committees to provide financial support for activities related to probation, such as probation camps or adventure courses."

The Pneumoconiosis, Byssinosis and Miscellaneous Diseases Benefit (Amendment) Scheme of 1971 made various improvements to the previous Pneumoconiosis, Byssinosis and Miscellaneous Diseases Benefit scheme introduced in 1966. The Workmen's Compensation (Supplementation) Amendment Scheme 1971 increased the weekly rate of lesser incapacity allowance that was payable under certain circumstances. Provision was also made (in regards to interest on compensation for injurious affection where no land is taken) for interest to payable on injurious affection, for the injurious affection claim, on farm loss payments, and on disturbance payments. In 1972, pensions for the widows of teachers were introduced.

The school leaving age was raised to 16, while Family Income Supplement was introduced to boost the incomes of low-income earners. Families who received this benefit were exempted from NHS charges while the children in such families were eligible for free school meals. According to one study, the number of working families living below the Supplementary Benefit level fell from 63,000 in 1970 to 50,000 in 1972; a fall that was largely attributable to the introduction of the Family Income Supplement. Non-contributory pensions were also introduced for all persons aged eighty and above, while the Social Security Act 1973 was passed which introduced benefit indexation in the United Kingdom for the first time by index-linking benefits to prices to maintain their real value. An amendment to the Social Security Act of 1973 required the secretary of state to publicize benefits for the disabled.

The National Insurance Act of 1971 introduced a special addition with no means test for all pensioners over 80, while in 1972 a £10 Christmas bonus was introduced. Annual upratings for all pensioners was also introduced. The Conservatives had previously promised in 1970 to review pensions every two years, but instead instituted an annual review. From October 1973 onwards a higher ' long – term rate ' of supplementary benefit "was paid to those who had received supplementary benefit for a continuous period." A decision was also made (from October 1973 onwards) to uprate long-term benefits by a larger amount than short-term benefits. That same year, a basic short-term rates were introduced for everyone else; the short-term sick and unemployed in the main. From 1972 onwards, "while there is no statutory commitment to this effect, the same cash increases have been made in the leading supplementary benefit scale rates as in their national insurance counterparts." In 1973, a statutory commitment to uprate national insurance benefits in line with prices was introduced. In December 1973, the four-week rule was suspended; a procedure introduced in July 1968 under which supplementary allowances were withdrawn from claimants regarded as fit for work if employment was available in the locality.

The Industrial Relations Act of 1971 gave employees "the right, depending on a minimum qualifying period, to appeal to an industrial tribunal, where compensation for unfair dismissal could be awarded based on length of service," and in 1972 preservation of accrued pension benefits after 5 or more years' service was introduced. The Legal Advice and Assistance Act 1972 set up a Green Form scheme under which advice of up to two hours, free of charge to the poorest or at reduced rates to those of modest means, became available. The Housing Finance Act 1972 "introduced a national formula for rent increases in the public sector and a mandatory system of local rent and rate rebates that survived subsequent legislation." The Supplementary Benefit (Determination of Requirements) Regulations 1972 increased the rent addition for non-householders and removed the present age qualification. The Students' Dependents' Allowances Regulations 1973 enabled the Secretary of State "to pay allowances to students attending first degree university etc. courses and courses for the training of teachers." A social security amendment of 1973 provided for allowing the Supplementary Benefits Commission "to make payments to cover funeral expenses without having regard to the powers of local authorities, so that the commission will not be inhibited by the fact that local authorities have certain powers concerning the disposal of bodies." Subsequently, the Commission "revised its policy on payments towards funeral expenses. Claimants are no longer advised to ask the Local Authority to make funeral arrangements, and the Commission will consider paying towards the costs of a private funeral under its powers to meet exceptional needs."

The Redundant Mineworkers and Concessionary Coal (Payments Schemes) Order 1973 provided for three new types of benefits, including "lump sums based on length of service for men redundant between age 35 and 55, and for men over 55 who due to lack of service in the industry do not qualify for basic benefit; a new benefit equivalent to the current rate of unemployment benefit to be paid to men when they have exhausted their 156 weeks of basic benefit until they reach age 65; and concessionary coal benefits for men made redundant between age 55 and 60, and certain men redundant over age 60. (Most men redundant over age 60 already receive concessionary coal under existing arrangements.) In addition, "The amount of benefit which a beneficiary may retain if he obtains other employment has also been increased."

The Employment and Training Act 1973 included various provisions. For instance, as specified in the text of the Act, "The Secretary of State may— pay to any person appointed in pursuance of the preceding paragraph such subsistence and travelling allowances and such compensation for loss of remunerative time as the Secretary of State may determine with the approval of the Minister for the Civil Service." In addition, "An industrial training board may— pay maintenance and travelling allowances to persons attending courses provided or approved by the board; make grants or loans to persons providing courses or other facilities approved by the board, to persons who make studies for the purpose of providing such courses or facilities and to persons who maintain arrangements to provide such courses or facilities which are not for the time being in use; pay fees to persons providing further education in respect of persons who receive it in association with their training in courses provided or approved by the board; make payments to persons in connection with arrangements under which they or employees of theirs make use of courses or other facilities provided or approved by the board."

The Redundant Mineworkers (Payments Scheme) Order 1972 was intended to be available for 3 years "to any miner who is made redundant after he has reached 55 to help him to adjust to the new situation and to the difficulties which confront him." It included a number of provisions for miners and their dependents including the addition of cost of living increments, a basic scheme benefit, an increase from £3 to £6 a week to the benefit "which can be kept if a redundant mineworker finds a new job and enters new employment, because if he did he would probably incur income tax, perhaps National Insurance contributions, travelling expenses and other expenses which might well have exceeded the £3 which he would have been able to draw if he had continued to draw that from the redundant mineworkers payment scheme." The rent allowance which is payable to a redundant mineworker was made transferable to a new house if he were to move his home, the rules regarding the offsetting of State and other coal industry benefits against the total of the mineworkers' redundancy payment benefit were eased, and the scheme was changed "so that in the event of a second redundancy—if a miner is made redundant a second time—his earnings are computed on the wages paid in the year immediately before the second redundancy as opposed to his previous level of earnings."

Also, "these last three concessions will apply to men who are in the existing scheme, not only to miners who might be made redundant in future, but to all those who are part of the existing scheme at the present time." The scheme also provided that the general increases in benefits, such as the special hardship allowance and workmen's compensation supplementation would not be offset as at present, and also provided for increases in benefits paid to men on workmen's compensation as a result of becoming total or major incapacity cases, award of special hardship allowance in respect of an accident or disease sustained after redundancies.

In addition, "any general increase in unemployment benefit between 6th April, 1972, and 6th April, 1973, will be offset against the benefit of men made redundant after 6th April, 1973." Also, "the maximum amount of benefit that can be kept by those who get a job is increased from £3 to £6" weekly, and "the table of basic benefit appropriate to the various ranges of pre-redundancy earnings set out in Appendix 4 has been recalculated so that the basic benefit, plus the 1971 rate of unemployment benefit for a man and one adult dependant, equals, after tax and on average over the three years, 90 per cent. of previous take-home pay." Other provisions included service in the coal industry "before nationalisation can now count towards the 10 qualifying years" and that women "who are not paying the full National Insurance stamp will be able to get some benefit despite not being eligible for unemployment benefit." In addition, "days of absence from home which disqualify a person from unemployment benefit, and also from 72 scheme benefit, will be counted as days rather than one day in a week resulting in a whole week's disqualification as at present." Also, "a man made redundant within the terms of the scheme and reemployed in the coal industry for more than a year and then made redundant a second time can choose on which of the two pre-redundancy earnings he wishes his benefit to be calculated." In addition, "the requirement that in order to continue getting the rent allowance a person must continue to live in the same house in which he was living when he was made redundant, and that this house must continue to be owned by the board, is removed." Also, "the relevant tax year on which pre-redundancy earnings are based will now be the previous tax year for everybody, instead of being two years ago for those made redundant during April."

Also, as noted by one MP, "Following the introduction of the first redundant mineworkers payments scheme in 1968, which provided benefits for men aged 55 or over on redundancy who otherwise satisfied the requirements of the scheme, there was pressure to enhance the terms available to enable such men to receive concessionary coal as though they had reached normal retirement age. The Government responded to this pressure in the Coal Industry Act 1973, amending the power to make schemes benefiting redundant mineworkers in the 1967 Act." Also in 1973, the first concessionary coal payments scheme was introduced by order, which provided for reimbursement to the National Coal Board "of the full cost of concessionary coal to men aged 55 to 59 who qualified for benefits under the redundant mineworkers payments scheme from 14 December 1969, and half the cost of providing concessionary coal to such men age 60 to 65."

A number of new superannuation provisions were introduced for various categories of workers. For those in the NHS, this included years and days used in benefit calculations instead of years and half years, the introduction of practitioner dynamising introduced i.e. 1.4% pensions, best of the last 3 years Total Superannuable Remuneration introduced instead of average of last 3 years, 3 x lump sum introduced for post 24 March 1972 service (married men), the introduction of a half rate widow's pension (was previously 1/3), a new rate of Child Allowance, a reduction in the qualifying period for pensions from 10 years to 5 years, the abolition of the qualifying period for Death Gratuities (DG), the introduction of double incapacity build up for service between 5 years and 9 years 364 days (or to age 65 if less), the introduction of 3 months initial widows pension, the introduction of widows limited pension (for 3, 4.5 or 6 months) for those widows who do not have title to continuing widows pensions, the introduction of a Limited Child Allowance, the introduction of automatic payment of benefits at age 70, the introduction of Added Years purchase, "Pensions Increase Supplement may apply" from January 1973 to October 1975, the extension of service to take account of untaken annual leave introduced for ancillary staff, and "Part time service may be superannuable provided half or more of the w/t basic is worked." The Pensions (Increase) Act of 1971 provided for regular increases in public service pensions by statutory instrument. The Act was later amended in 1972 and 1974 "to lower the minimum qualifying age for pensions increase from 60 to 55 and to provide for all pensions paid to widows of scheme members to be increased."

The Superannuation Act of 1972 provided for new arrangements for premature retirement on grounds of limited efficiency, granted civil servants rights to their pensions and established the Principal Civil Service Pension Scheme, the Civil Service Additional Voluntary Contribution Scheme (CSAVCS), the Civil Service Compensation Scheme (CSCS) and the Civil Service Injury Benefits Scheme (CSIBS).

The Local Government (Retirement of Chief Officers) Regulations 1973 provided "for persons identified as chief officers and deputy chief officers of local authorities, and certain other persons affected by local government reorganisation, to elect for early retirement on enhanced pension terms and thereby forgo any right to claim compensation which might otherwise have been exercised under section 259 of the Local Government Act 1972." Section 27 of the Water Act 1973 empowered water authorities to establish and administer pension schemes and funds. The Social Security Act of 1973 made further provisions "for occupational pensions, established the Occupational Pensions Board and the contributory reserve pension scheme under a Reserve Pension Board for not recognised pensionable employment." The Legal Aid Act 1974 raised the upper disposable income limit for eligibility for civil legal aid.

=== Scottish nationalism ===
Scottish nationalism grew as a political force, while the decimalisation of British coinage, begun under the previous Labour government, was completed eight months after Heath came to power. The Central Policy Review Staff was established by Heath in February 1971, while the Local Government Act 1972 changed the boundaries of the counties of England and Wales and created Metropolitan Counties around the major cities (e.g. Merseyside around Liverpool): this caused significant public anger. Heath did not divide England into regions, choosing instead to await the report of the Crowther Commission on the constitution; the 10 Government Office Regions were eventually set up by the Major government in 1994.

=== Economic policy ===
The Chancellor of the Exchequer, Iain Macleod, died and was replaced on 20 July 1970 by Anthony Barber. Heath's planned economic policy changes (including a significant shift from direct to indirect taxation) remained largely unimplemented: the Selsdon policy document was more or less abandoned as unemployment increased considerably by 1972. By January that year, the number of unemployed reached a million, the highest level for more than two decades. Opposed to unemployment on moral grounds, Heath encouraged a famous "U-Turn" in economic policy that precipitated what became known as the "Barber Boom". This was a two-range process involving the budgets of 1972 and 1973, the former of which pumped £2.5 billion into the economy in increased pensions and benefits and tax reductions. By early 1974, as a result of this Keynesian economic strategy, unemployment had fallen to under 550,000. The economic boom did not last, and the Heath government implemented various cuts that led to the abandonment of policy goals such as a planned expansion of nursery education.

=== Trade unions ===
Much of the government's attention, as well as the media and public opinion, focused on deteriorating labour relations, as the government sought to weaken the economic power of the trade unions, which had grown steadily since 1945. The Industrial Relations Act 1971 set up a special court under the judge Lord Donaldson. Its imprisonment of striking dockworkers was a public relations disaster and became an object lesson for the Thatcher government of the 1980s. Thatcher relied instead on confiscating the assets of unions that courts found to have violated anti-strike laws.

The trade unions responded with a full-scale counterattack on a government hobbled by inflation and high unemployment. Especially damaging to the government's credibility were the two miners' strikes of 1972 and 1974, the latter of which resulted in much of the country's industry working a Three-Day Week in an attempt to conserve energy. The National Union of Mineworkers won its case but the energy shortages and the resulting breakdown of domestic consensus contributed to the eventual downfall of his government.

=== Unemployment ===
There was a steep rise in unemployment for the first two years of the Heath ministry, but it was then reversed. Labour in 1964 had inherited an unemployment count of around 400,000 but saw unemployment peak at 631,000 in early 1967. At election time in June 1970, the unemployment numbers were still high at 582,000. Heath and the Conservatives were pledged to "full employment" but within a year it became clear that they were losing that battle, as the official unemployment count crept towards 1,000,000 and some newspapers suggested that it was even higher. In January 1972 it was officially confirmed that unemployment had risen above 1,000,000 – a level not seen for more than 30 years. Various other reports around this time suggested that unemployment was higher still, with The Times newspaper claiming that "nearly 3,000,000" people were jobless by March of that year.

=== Foreign policy ===
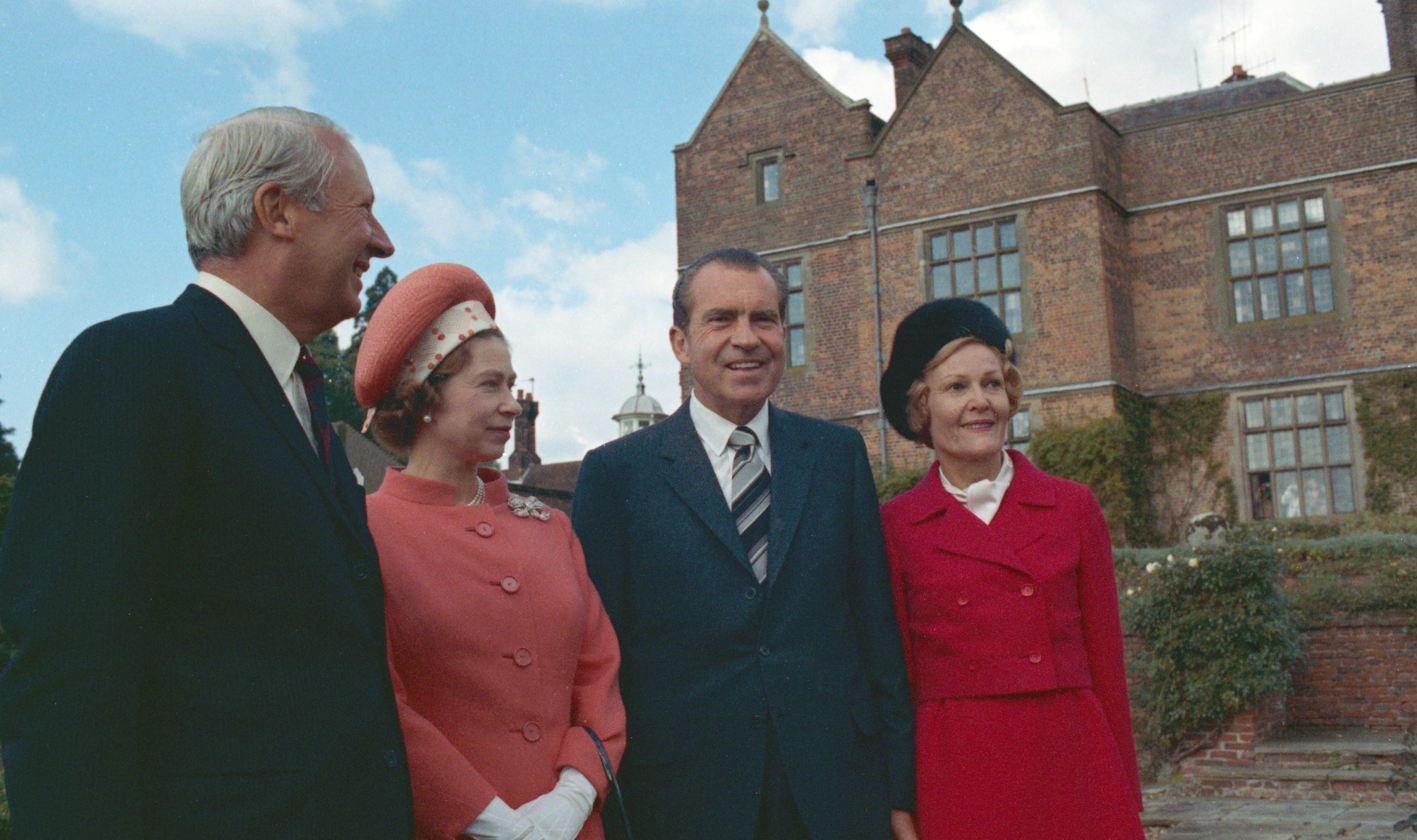
Heath and the Queen with the visiting US president Richard Nixon and first lady Pat Nixon in 1970

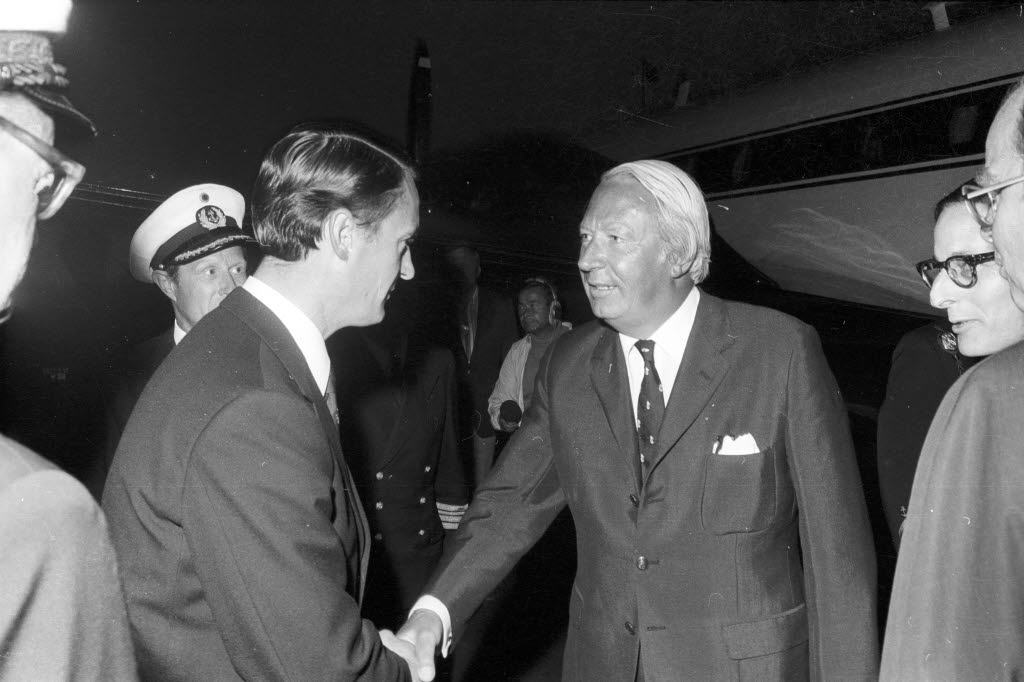
Heath with German CDU politician Uwe Barschel in 1972

Upon entering office in June 1970, Heath immediately set about trying to reverse Wilson's policy of ending Britain's military presence East of Suez. Heath took the United Kingdom into Europe on 1 January 1973, following passage in Parliament of the European Communities Act 1972 in October.

He publicly supported the massive U.S. bombing of Hanoi and Haiphong in December 1972.

According to John McEvoy and Mark Curtis of Declassified UK, his government quickly recognised the military regime of Augusto Pinochet in Chile and maintained good relations with it, despite the illegal nature of the Pinochet regime's coup d'état.

In October 1973 he placed a British arms embargo on all combatants in the Arab-Israeli Yom Kippur War, which mostly affected the Israelis by preventing them obtaining spares for their Centurion tanks. Heath refused to allow US intelligence gathering from British bases in Cyprus, resulting in a temporary halt in the US signals intelligence tap.

He favoured links with the People's Republic of China, visiting Mao Zedong in Beijing in 1974 and 1975 and remaining an honoured guest in China on frequent visits thereafter and forming a close relationship with Mao's successor Deng Xiaoping. Heath realised that to become closer to Europe he needed to be further from the United States, so he downplayed the Special Relationship that had long knitted the two nations together. The two nations differed on such major crises as Britain's EC membership, the Nixon economic "shocks" of 1971, the Bangladesh Liberation War, détente with Soviet Union, Kissinger's Year of Europe and the Middle East crisis of 1973.

=== Northern Ireland ===
Heath served as Prime Minister during an especially violent period of the Troubles in Northern Ireland. Events such as the Falls Curfew, Operation Motorman and Bloody Sunday led to the near-collapse in relations between the Irish Catholic community and British security forces. In 1971, Heath sent MI6 officer Frank Steele to hold talks with the Provisional Irish Republican Army (IRA) and find common ground to begin official negotiations. In July 1972, Heath permitted the Secretary of State for Northern Ireland, William Whitelaw, to hold unofficial talks in London with an IRA delegation led by Seán Mac Stíofáin. In the aftermath of these unsuccessful talks, Heath pushed for a peaceful settlement with Northern Irish political parties exclusively committed to nonviolence.

The 1973 Sunningdale Agreement, which proposed a power-sharing deal, was strongly repudiated by many Unionists, including the Ulster Unionist Party, which withdrew its MPs at Westminster from the Conservative whip. The proposal was finally brought down by the Unionist Ulster Workers' Council strike in 1974, by which time Heath was no longer in office.

Heath was targeted by the IRA for introducing internment without trial in Northern Ireland. In December 1974, an IRA active service unit threw a bomb onto the first-floor balcony of his home in Wilton Street, Belgravia where it exploded. Heath had been conducting a Christmas carol concert at Broadstairs and arrived home 10 minutes after the bomb exploded. No one was injured in the attack, but a landscape painted by Winston Churchill – given to Heath as a present – was damaged. In January 2003, Heath gave evidence to the Saville Inquiry and stated that he had never sanctioned unlawful lethal force in Northern Ireland.

== Fall from power ==
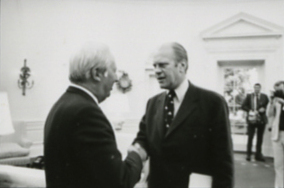
Heath greeting US president Gerald Ford in September 1974

=== 1974 general elections ===
Heath tried to bolster his government by calling a general election for 28 February 1974, using the election slogan "Who governs Britain?". The result of the election was inconclusive with no party gaining an overall majority in the House of Commons; the Conservatives had the most votes but Labour had slightly more seats. Heath began negotiations with Jeremy Thorpe, leader of the Liberal Party, but when these failed, he resigned as prime minister on 4 March 1974, and was replaced by Wilson's minority Labour government, eventually confirmed, though with a tiny majority, in a second election in October. To date, Heath is the last British Prime Minister to have both assumed and lost their term of office by means of a general election.

=== Rise of Thatcher ===
Heath came to be seen as a liability by many Conservative MPs, party activists and newspaper editors. His personality was considered cold and aloof, annoying even to his friends. Alan Watkins observed in 1991 that his "brusqueness, his gaucherie, his lack of small or indeed any talk, his sheer bad manners" were among the factors costing him the support of Conservative backbenchers in the subsequent Conservative leadership election.

He resolved to remain Conservative leader, even after losing the October 1974 general election, and at first it appeared that by calling on the loyalty of his front-bench colleagues he might prevail. In the weeks following the second election defeat, Heath came under tremendous pressure to concede a review of the rules and agreed to establish a commission to propose changes and to seek re-election. There was no clear challenger after Enoch Powell had left the party and Keith Joseph had ruled himself out after controversial statements implying that the working classes should be encouraged to use more birth control. Joseph's close friend and ally Margaret Thatcher, who believed that an adherent to the philosophy of the Centre for Policy Studies should stand, joined the leadership contest in his place alongside the outsider Hugh Fraser. Aided by Airey Neave's campaigning among backbench MPs — whose earlier approach to William Whitelaw had been rebuffed, out of loyalty to Heath — she emerged as the only serious challenger.

The new rules permitted new candidates to enter the ballot in a second round of voting should the first be inconclusive, so Thatcher's challenge was considered by some to be that of a stalking horse. Neave deliberately understated Thatcher's support to attract wavering votes from MPs who were keen to see Heath replaced even though they did not necessarily want Thatcher to replace him.

On 4 February 1975, Thatcher defeated Heath in the first ballot by 130 votes to 119, with Fraser coming in a distant third with 16 votes. This was not a big enough margin to give Thatcher the 15% majority necessary to win on the first ballot, but having finished in second place Heath immediately resigned and did not contest the next ballot. His favoured candidate, William Whitelaw, lost to Thatcher in the second vote one week later (Thatcher 146, Whitelaw 79, Howe 19, Prior 19, Peyton 11). The vote polarised along right-left lines, with in addition the region, experience and education of the MP having their effects. Heath and Whitelaw were stronger on the left, among Oxbridge and public school graduates, and in MPs from Northern England or Scotland.

Thatcher had promised Heath a seat in the Shadow Cabinet and planned to offer him whatever post he wanted. His advisors agreed he should wait at least six months, so he declined. He never relented and his refusal was called "the incredible sulk". Thatcher visited Heath at his home shortly after her election as leader and had to stay for coffee with his PPS Timothy Kitson so the waiting press would not realise how brief the visit had been. Heath claimed that he had simply declined her request for advice about how to handle the press, whilst Thatcher claimed that she offered him any Shadow Cabinet position he wanted and asked him to lead the Conservative campaign in the imminent EEC referendum, only to be rudely rebuffed.

== Later career (1975–2001) ==
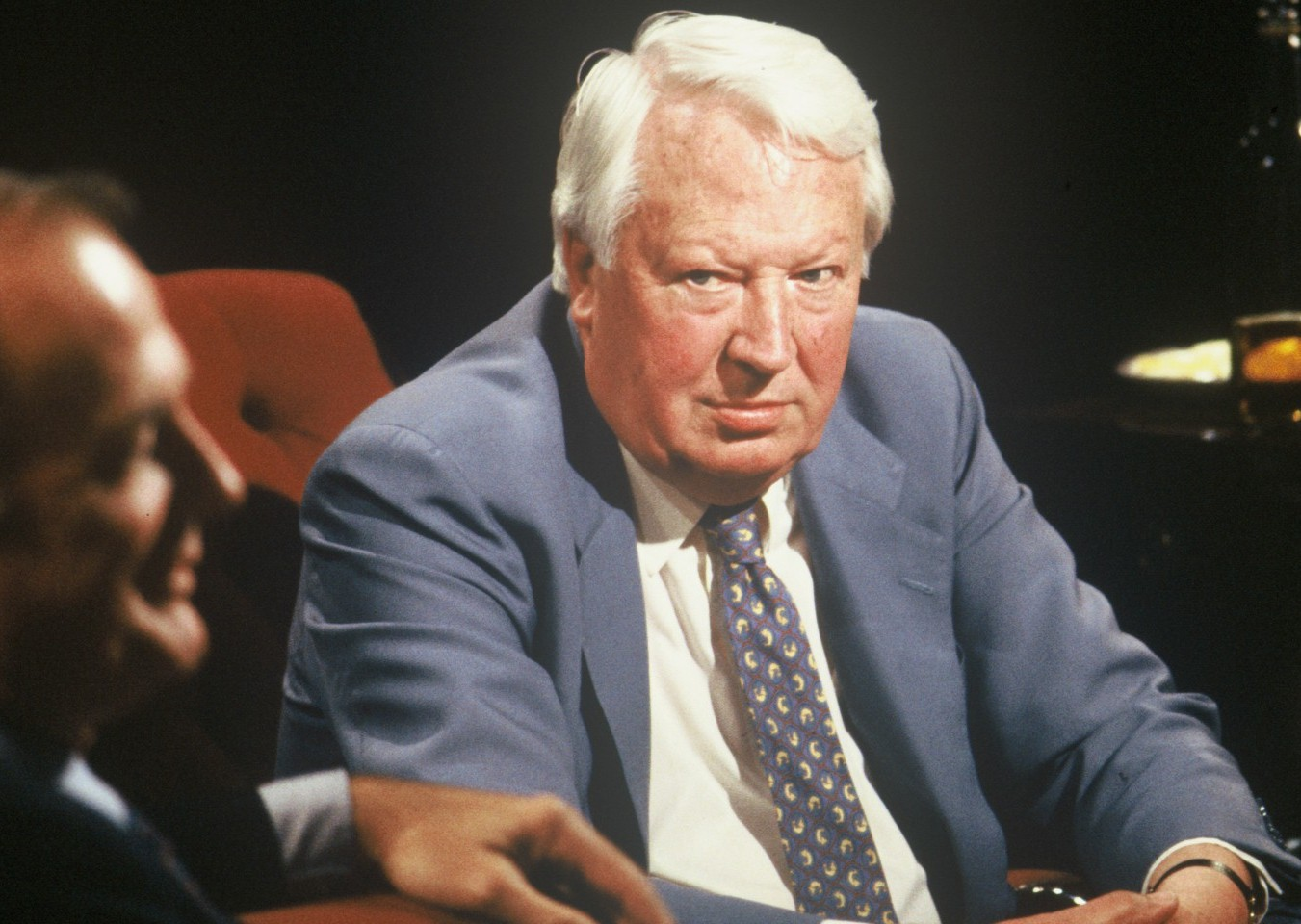
Appearing on television discussion programme After Dark in 1989

For many years, Heath persisted in criticism of the party's new ideological direction. At the time of his defeat, he was still popular with rank-and-file Conservative members and was warmly applauded at the 1975 Conservative Party Conference. He played a leading role in the 1975 referendum campaign in which the UK voted to remain part of the EEC, and he remained active on the international stage, serving on the Brandt Commission investigation into developmental issues, particularly on North–South projects (Brandt Report).

His relations with Thatcher remained poor, and in 1979–80, he turned down her offers of the positions of Ambassador to the United States and Secretary General of NATO. He continued as a central figure on the left of the party and, at the 1981 Conservative Party conference, openly criticised the government's economic policy of monetarism, which had seen inflation rise from 13% in 1979 to 18% in 1980 then fall to 4% by 1983, but had seen unemployment double from around 1.5 million to a postwar high of 3.3 million during that time.

In 1990, he flew to Baghdad to attempt to negotiate the release of aircraft passengers on British Airways Flight 149 and other British nationals taken hostage when Saddam Hussein invaded Kuwait. Following the events of Black Wednesday in 1992, he stated in the House of Commons that government should build a fund of reserves to counter currency speculators.

In 1987, he was nominated in the election for the Chancellorship of the University of Oxford but lost to Roy Jenkins as a result of splitting the Conservative vote with Lord Blake.

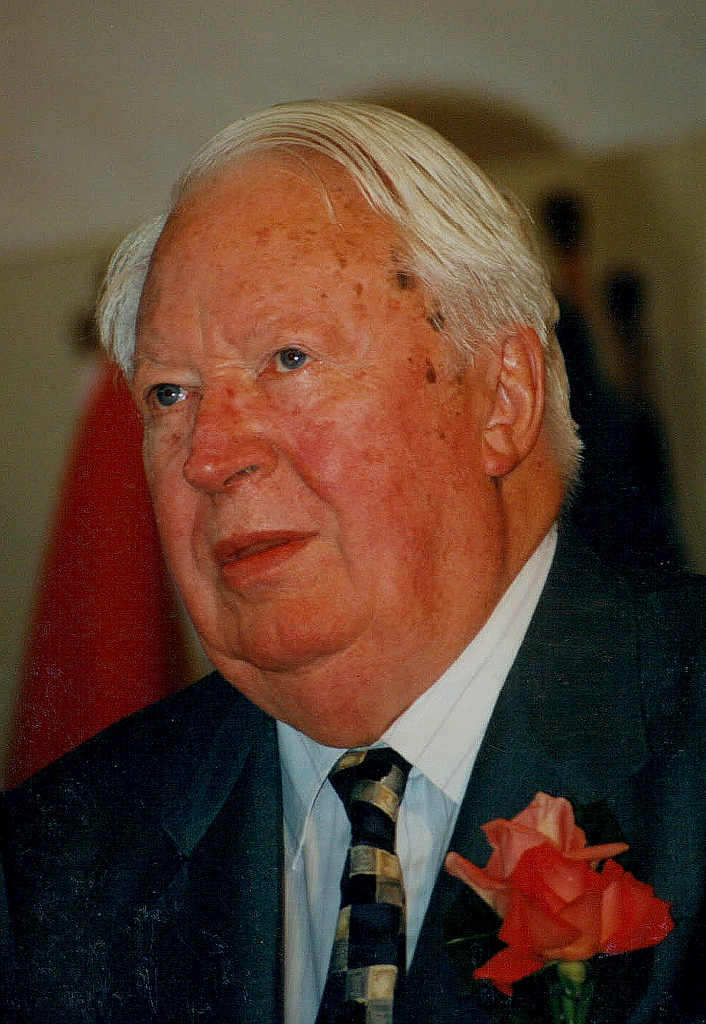
Heath in 1995

Heath continued to serve as a backbench MP for the London constituency of Old Bexley and Sidcup and was, from 1992, the longest-serving MP ("Father of the House") and the oldest British MP. As Father of the House, he oversaw the election of two Speakers of the Commons, Betty Boothroyd and Michael Martin. Heath was created a Knight Companion of the Garter on 23 April 1992. He retired from Parliament at the 2001 general election. Heath and Tony Benn were the last two serving MPs to have been elected during the reign of George VI, with Heath serving continuously since 1950.

Heath maintained business links with several companies including a Saudi think tank, two investment funds and a Chinese freight operator, mainly as an adviser on China or a member of the governing board. According to Chris Patten, the last Governor of Hong Kong, his commercial interests in China could have been one of the reasons why he denounced the democratic reforms introduced in the run-up to the handover of Hong Kong.

Parliament broke with precedent by commissioning a bust of Heath while he was still alive. Commentators have noted how the statue of Margaret Thatcher appears to overshadow Heath's bust. The 1993 bronze work, by Martin Jennings, was moved to the Members' Lobby in 2002. On 29 April 2002, in his eighty-sixth year, he made a public appearance at Downing Street alongside the then–prime minister Tony Blair and the three other surviving former prime ministers at the time (James Callaghan, Margaret Thatcher and John Major), as well as relatives of deceased prime ministers, for a dinner which was part of the Golden Jubilee of Elizabeth II. This was to be one of his last public appearances, as the following year saw a decline in his health.

== Personal life ==
=== Private residence ===
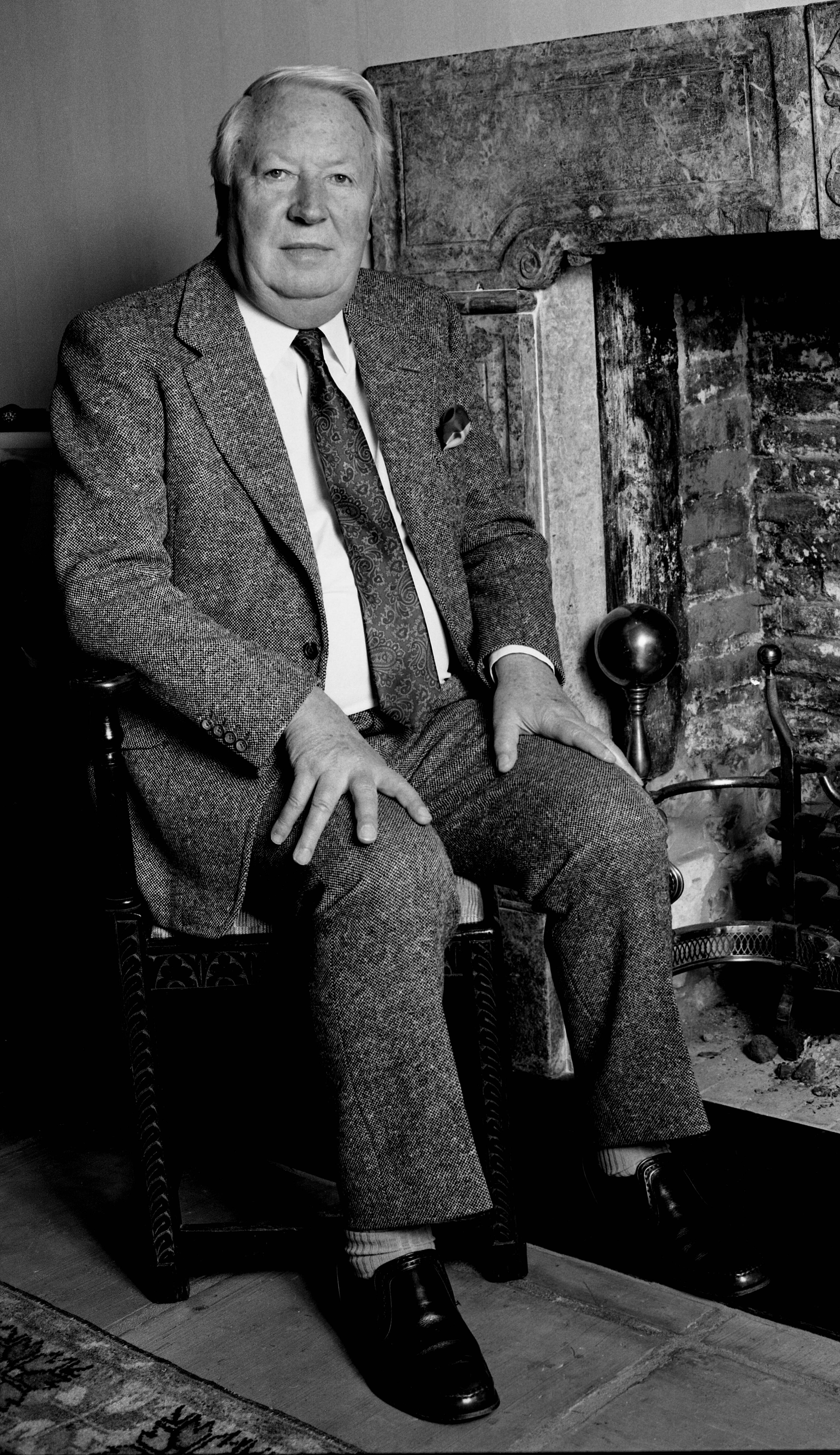
Heath in his Salisbury home, 1987

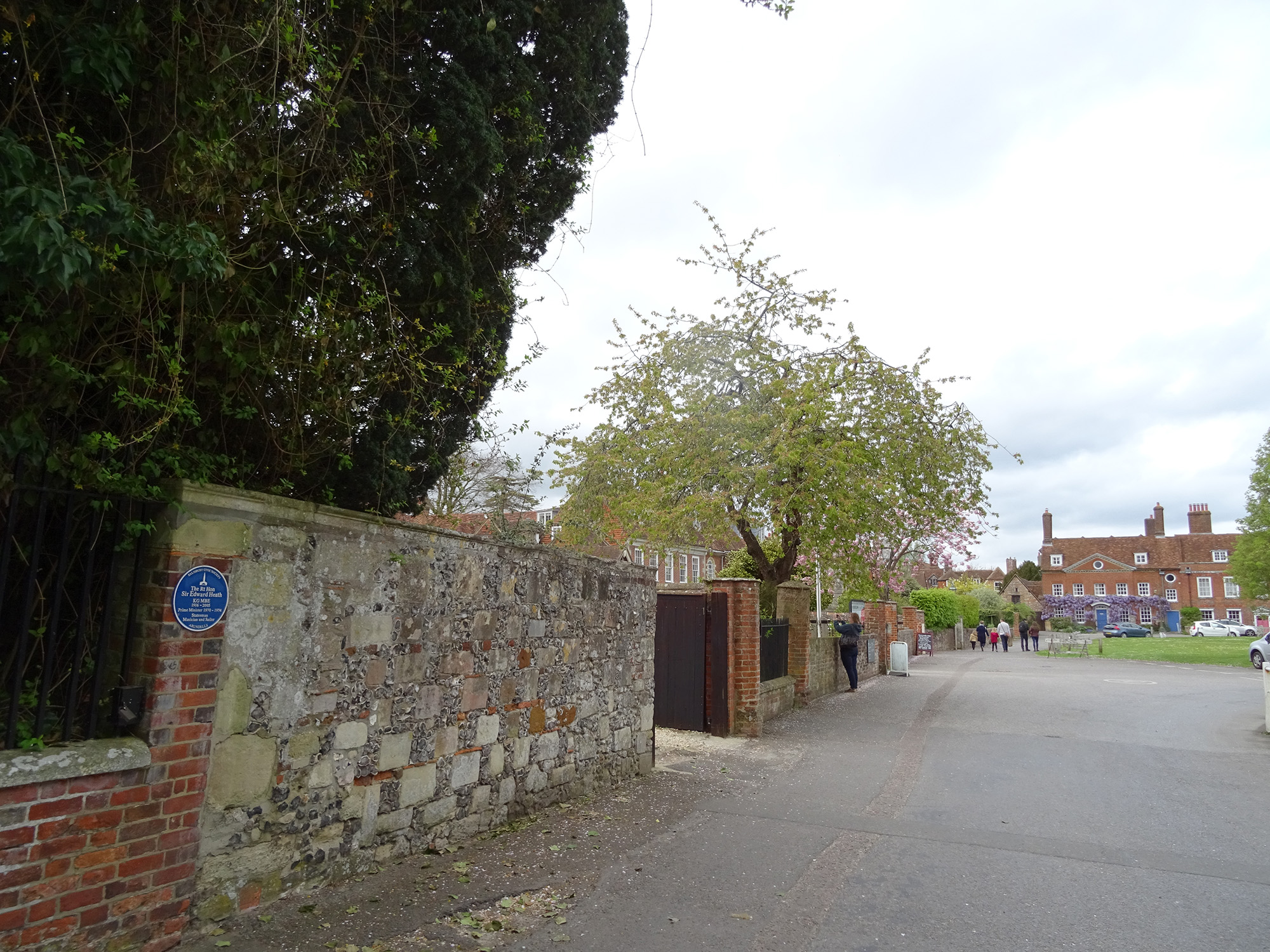
Blue plaque located on the boundary wall of Arundells

In the 1960s, Heath had lived in Albany, off Piccadilly; at the unexpected end of his premiership, the French couple living there refused his demand that they move out so that he could have his flat back ("So much for European Unity!" Heath later wrote in his memoirs). For four months, Heath took the flat of Conservative MP Timothy Kitson; Kitson declined his offer to pay rent but later recalled an occasion when his own watch broke, and Heath in response invited him to take one of a large collection that he had been given on his travels. In July 1974, the Duke of Westminster, a major London landowner and ardent Europhile, allowed Heath to rent a property in Wilton Street, Belgravia, for an annual rent of £1,250 (£11,851 at 2025 prices), a tenth of the market value. The house had three storeys and a basement flat for Heath's housekeeper, and he continued to use it as his London home until old age prevented him from climbing the stairs.

In February 1985, Heath acquired a Wiltshire home, Arundells, in the Cathedral close at Salisbury, where he resided until his death twenty years later. In January 2006, it was announced that Heath had placed his house and contents, valued at £5 million in his will, in a charitable foundation, the Sir Edward Heath Charitable Foundation, to conserve the house as a museum to his career. The house is open to the public for guided tours from March to October; displayed therein is a large collection of personal effects as well as Heath's personal library, photo collections, and paintings by Winston Churchill.

In his will, Heath, who had no descendants, left only two legacies: £20,000 to his brother's widow, and £2,500 to his housekeeper.

=== Yachting ===
Heath was a keen yachtsman. He bought his first yacht Morning Cloud in 1969 and won the Sydney to Hobart Yacht Race that year. He captained Britain's winning team for the Admiral's Cup in 1971 – while prime minister – and also captained the team in the 1979 Fastnet Race. He was a member of the Broadstairs Sailing Club, where he learnt to sail on a Snipe and a Fireball before moving on to success in larger boats.

=== Classical music ===
Heath maintained an interest in classical music as a pianist, organist and orchestral conductor, famously installing a Steinway grand in 10 Downing Street – bought with his £450 Charlemagne Prize money, awarded for his unsuccessful efforts to bring Britain into the EEC in 1963, and chosen on the advice of his friend, the pianist Moura Lympany – and conducting Christmas carol concerts in Broadstairs every year from his teens until old age.

Heath conducted the London Symphony Orchestra, notably at a gala concert at the Royal Festival Hall in November 1971, at which he conducted Sir Edward Elgar's overture Cockaigne (In London Town). He also conducted the Royal Liverpool Philharmonic and the English Chamber Orchestra, as well as orchestras in Germany and the United States. During his premiership, Heath invited musician friends, such as Isaac Stern, Yehudi Menuhin, Clifford Curzon and the Amadeus Quartet, to perform either at Chequers or 10 Downing Street. Heath was the founding President of the European Community Youth Orchestra (in 1976), now the European Union Youth Orchestra.

In 1988, Heath recorded Beethoven's Triple Concerto, Op. 56 (with members of the Trio Zingara as soloists) and Boccherini's Cello Concerto in G major, G480.

=== Football ===
Heath was a supporter of the Lancashire football club Burnley, and just after the end of his term as prime minister in 1974 he opened the £450,000 Bob Lord Stand at the club's Turf Moor stadium.

=== Author ===
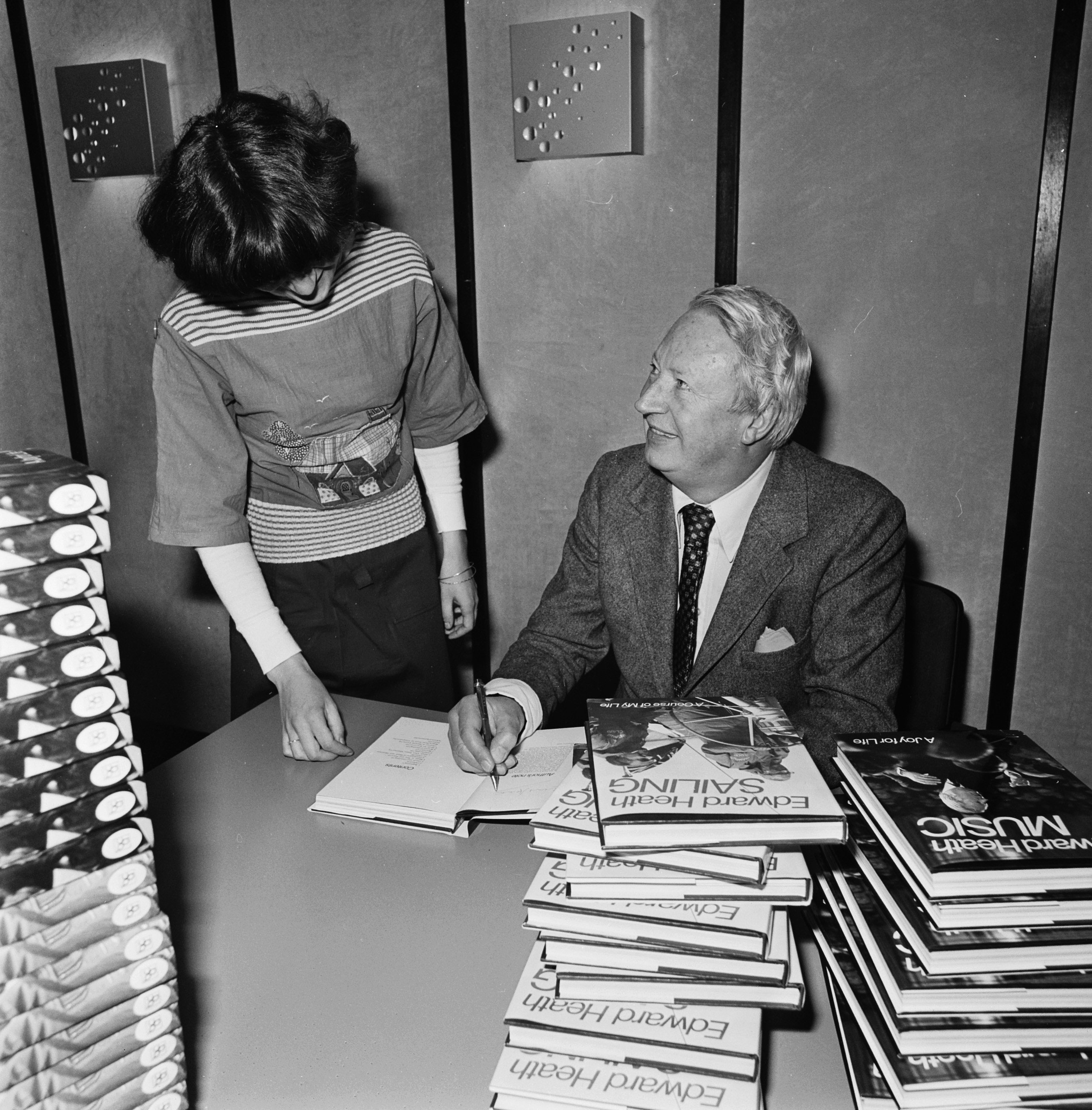
Heath book-signing in 1977

Heath wrote several books in the second half of the 1970s: Sailing, Music, and Travels. He also compiled a collection of carols called The Joy of Christmas, published in 1978 by Oxford University Press, which contained the music and lyrics to a wide variety of Christmas carols, each accompanied by a reproduction of a piece of religious art and a short introduction by Heath.

Heath's autobiography, The Course of My Life, appeared in 1998. According to his obituary in The Daily Telegraph, this "had involved dozens of researchers and writers (some of whom he never paid) over many years".

=== "Grocer Heath" ===
In 1964, despite substantial opposition from many Conservative MPs and independent grocers and shopkeepers, Heath led a successful fight to abolish resale price maintenance.

Private Eye, a satirical current affairs magazine, thereupon persistently ridiculed him as "Grocer Heath". The magazine also parodied him as the managing director of a struggling small company, "Heathco". The nickname was coined as a parody of Keith West's 1967 hit single "Excerpt from 'A Teenage Opera'", which features the phrase "Grocer Jack" sung during its refrain.

=== Sexuality ===
Heath never married. He had been expected to marry childhood friend Kay Raven, who was reportedly tired of waiting and married an RAF officer whom she met on holiday in 1950. In a four-sentence paragraph of his memoirs, Heath claimed that he had been too busy establishing a career after the war and had "perhaps ... taken too much for granted". In a 1998 TV interview with Michael Cockerell, Heath said that he had kept her photograph in his flat for many years afterwards.

His interest in music kept him on friendly terms with female musicians, including pianist Moura Lympany. When Heath was prime minister she was approached by the Conservative MP Tufton Beamish, who said: "Moura, Ted must get married. Will you marry him?" She said she would have done but was in love with someone else. She later said the most intimate thing Heath had done was to put his arm around her shoulder.

Bernard Levin wrote at the time in The Observer that the UK had to wait until the emergence of the permissive society for a prime minister who was a virgin. In later life, according to his official biographer Philip Ziegler, at dinner parties Heath was "apt to relapse into morose silence or completely ignore the woman next to him and talk across her to the nearest man"; others at the time claimed Heath was just not talkative at parties.

There were many innuendos in Private Eye about his being homosexual and chants insinuating the same could be heard outside Downing Street during protests by trade unionists against his Industrial Relations Bill.

John Campbell, who published a biography of Heath in 1993, devoted four pages to a discussion of the evidence concerning Heath's sexuality. While acknowledging that Heath was often assumed by the public to be gay, not least because it is "nowadays ... whispered of any bachelor", he found "no positive evidence" that this was so "except for the faintest unsubstantiated rumour" (the footnote refers to a mention of a "disturbing incident" at the beginning of the Second World War in a 1972 biography by Andrew Roth). Campbell ultimately concluded that the most significant aspect of Heath's sexuality was his complete repression of it.

Brian Coleman, the Conservative Party London Assembly member for Barnet and Camden, claimed in 2007 that Heath, to protect his career, had stopped cottaging in the 1950s. Coleman said it was "common knowledge" among Conservatives that Heath had been given a stern warning by police when he underwent background checks for the post of privy counsellor. Heath's biographer Philip Ziegler wrote in 2010 that Coleman was able to provide "little or no information" to back up this statement, that no man had ever claimed to have had a sexual relationship with Heath, nor was any trace of homosexuality to be found in his papers, and that "those who knew him well" insist that he had no such inclination. He believes Heath to have been asexual, although he does mention a letter from one "Freddy", who seems hurt that "Teddie" had spurned his advances (chapter 2 of his book).

Lord Armstrong of Ilminster, who was Heath's friend and former private secretary, stated his belief that Heath was asexual, saying that he "never detected a whiff of sexuality in relation to men, women or children." Another friend and confidant, Sara Morrison, former vice-chairman of the Conservative Party, said Heath had "effectively" told her "that he was sexless". Charles Moore, in his authorised biography of Margaret Thatcher, said that Bill Deedes believed that Thatcher "seem[ed] convinced" Heath was gay, whilst Moore believed it is "possible" that Thatcher's reference, in interview in 1974, to Heath not having a family, was a deliberate hint that he was gay, in order to discredit him. Thatcher certainly seems to have disliked Heath. "When I look at him and he looks at me," she once remarked, according to Ziegler (Chapter 4), "it doesn't feel like a man looking at a woman, more like a woman looking at another woman."

When he moved to Arundells in 1985, Heath hired Derek Frost, life partner of Jeremy Norman, to modernise and redecorate the house in Salisbury. He became friends with the couple, though never close. When they asked Heath why he had not supported homosexual law reform (he was either absent from the debates in the 1960s or voted against Lord Arran's first Bill in May 1965), he replied that he had always been in favour but that "the rank and file of the party would never have stood for it." Norman's view is that Heath was "a deeply closeted gay man" who "decided early in life to sublimate his sexuality to his political ambitions."

Similarly, Michael McManus, who was Heath's private secretary in the 1990s and helped with his memoirs, writes in his book on gay conservative politicians that he "was left in no doubt whatsoever that Heath was a gay man who had sacrificed his personal life to his political career, exercising iron self-control and living a celibate existence as he climbed the 'greasy pole' of preferment."

=== Allegations of child sexual abuse ===
In April 2015, a rape claim against Heath was investigated by the Metropolitan Police but was dropped. In August 2015, several police forces were investigating allegations of child sexual abuse by Heath. Hampshire, Jersey, Kent, Wiltshire, Gloucestershire and Thames Valley constabularies and London's Metropolitan Police investigated such claims. It was reported that a man had claimed that at the age of 12 years he had been raped by Heath in a Mayfair flat in 1961, after he had run away from home. Allegations about Heath were investigated as part of Operation Midland, the Metropolitan Police inquiry into claims of historic child abuse and related homicides. A witness called "Nick" was introduced to the police by the former Exaro website, who had asked him about alleged child sexual abuse by prominent figures at the Dolphin Square apartment complex in Pimlico, London; Heath was reported to be one of the figures. In 2018 "Nick", whose real name is Carl Beech, was arrested and charged over child pornography offences and in January 2019 he pleaded guilty. Beech, who had fabricated allegations against Heath and other prominent politicians and civil servants, was sentenced in July 2019 to eighteen years in prison.

Also in August 2015, Sky News reported that Jersey police were investigating allegations against Heath as part of Operation Whistle, and a similar investigation, Operation Conifer, was launched by Wiltshire Police at the same time. The Sir Edward Heath Charitable Foundation, which operates the museum at Arundells, his home in Salisbury, said it welcomed the investigation. In November 2016, criminologist Richard Hoskins said that the evidence used against Heath in Operation Conifer, including discredited allegations of satanic ritual abuse, was "preposterous", "fantastical" and gained through the "controversial" practice of recovered-memory therapy. Operation Conifer was closed in March 2017, having cost a reported £1.5 million over two years, as no corroborating evidence had been found in any of the 42 allegations by 40 individuals (including three different names used by one person).

In September 2017, it was announced that the Independent Inquiry into Child Sexual Abuse would review the police investigation into Heath. Police said that if Heath were still alive they would have interviewed him under caution in relation to seven out of the 42 allegations, but nothing should be inferred about his guilt or innocence.

In his summary report, Chief Constable Mike Veale confirmed that "no further corroborative evidence was found" to support the satanic abuse claims.

== Illness and death ==
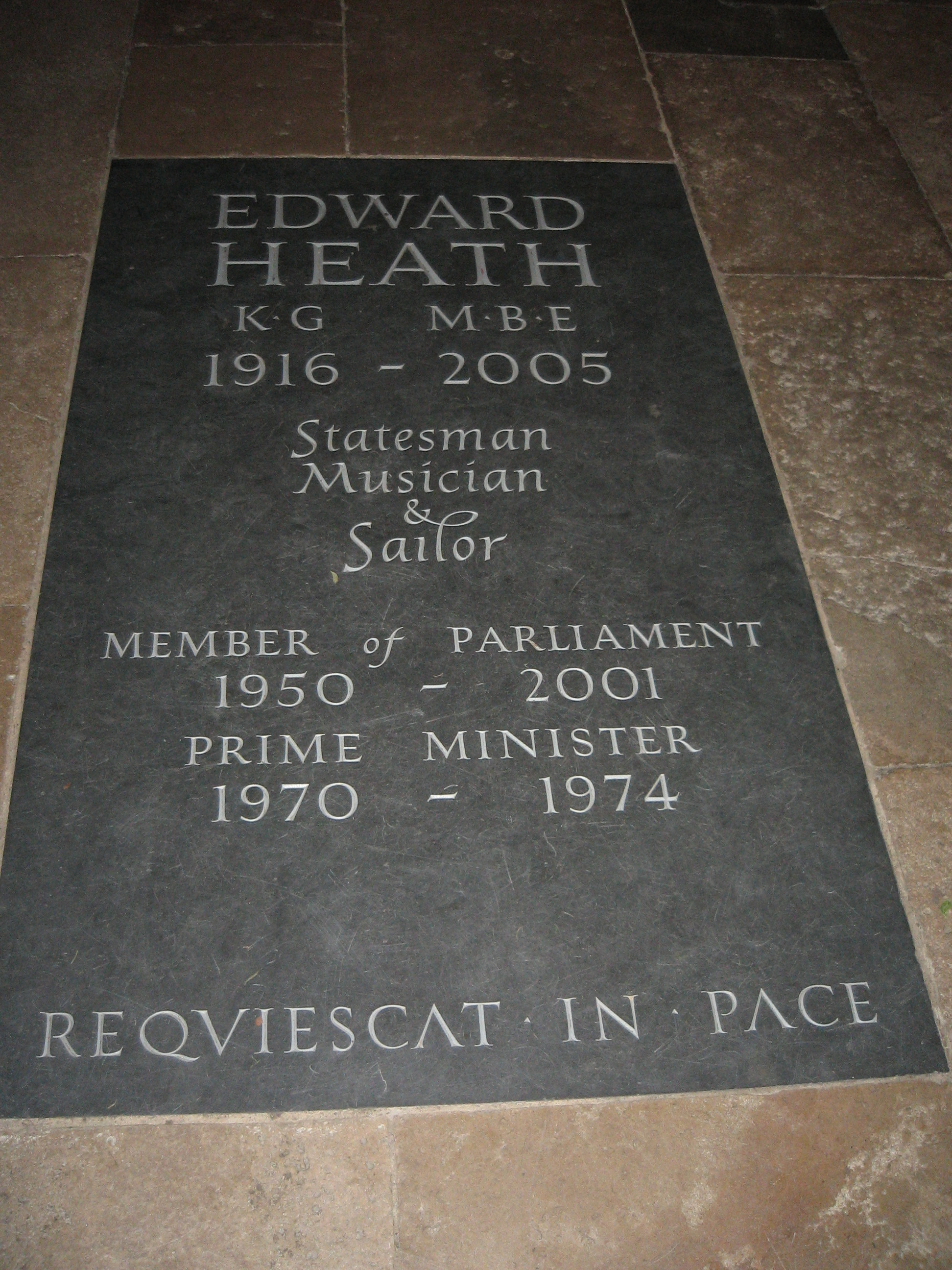
Heath's monument in Salisbury Cathedral

In August 2003, at the age of 87, Heath suffered a pulmonary embolism while on holiday in Salzburg, Austria. He never fully recovered, and owing to his declining health and mobility made very few public appearances in the last two years of his life. His last appearance was at the unveiling of a set of gates at St Paul's Cathedral dedicated to Churchill on 30 November 2004.

In his final public statement, Heath paid tribute to James Callaghan, who died on 26 March 2005, saying "James Callaghan was a major fixture in the political life of this country during his long and varied career. When in opposition he never hesitated to put firmly his party's case. When in office he took a smoother approach towards his supporters and opponents alike. Although he left the House of Commons in 1987 he continued to follow political life and it was always a pleasure to meet with him. We have lost a major figure from our political landscape."

Just under four months later, Heath died at his home from pneumonia at 7.30 pm on 17 July 2005, at the age of 89, the day after his spokesman said he was "nearing the end of his life". He was cremated on 25 July 2005 at a funeral service attended by 1,500 people. On the day after his death, the BBC Parliament channel showed the BBC results coverage of the 1970 election. A memorial service was held for Heath in Westminster Abbey on 8 November 2005, which was attended by 2,000 people. Three days later his ashes were interred in Salisbury Cathedral. In a tribute to him, the then-prime minister Tony Blair stated "He was a man of great integrity and beliefs he held firmly from which he never wavered".

== Honours ==
Heath received several accolades and honours.

=== Coat of arms ===
Coat of arms of Edward Heath
Crest Out of a Naval Coronet Or, a Swan close proper resting its foot on a closed Cup Or. Escutcheon Per bend Purpure and Vert, over all a Bend grady Or, issuant in sinister chief a Cloud, irradiated proper, and in dexter base a Portcullis chained Or. Supporters On the dexter Sea-Lion Or charged with a voided Escutcheon Vert and on the sinister a Horse Argent gorged with a Ducal Coronet Vert. Motto Plus Fait Douceur Que Violence (lit. Sweetness does more than violence) Orders The Garter circlet; motto: Honi soit qui mal y pense (Shame be to him who thinks evil of it). & Medal of the Member of the Order of the British Empire Symbolism The arms symbolise various parts of Heath's life. The bend grady represents the zig-zag pattern of the Royal Artillery tie, as well as Broadstairs, his birthplace. The green colour is for heath, while the purple is for heather, which refers to his surname. The cloud symbolises 'Morning Cloud', his yacht. The irradiations issuing from it symbolise entering the European communities. The portcullis is the symbol of Parliament and represents his career as a politician. The swan and the gold cup in the crest represent two livery companies: the Worshipful Company of Musicians (of which he was an honorary freeman) and the Goldsmiths' Company (of which he was a liveryman), respectively. Heath's captaincy of yachting teams is symbolised by the naval crown in the crest. The sea-lion and white horse supporters are both taken from the Kent county coat of arms, honouring the county that Heath was born in as well as the location of his parliamentary constituency. The voided escutcheon on the sea-lion's neck also appears in the arms of Balliol College, Heath's alma mater. The horse is gorged with a ducal coronet, which refers to the crown in the arms of the Diocese of Salisbury. This symbolises the location of Heath's home in Salisbury. Heath's motto was taken from a motto that appeared on his clavichord.

=== Honorary degrees and fellowships ===
Heath was awarded a number of honorary degrees:

Country	Date	School	Honour
England	1966	Royal College of Music	Fellow (FRCM)
England	1971	University of Oxford	Doctor of Civil Law (DCL)
England	1971	University of Bradford	Doctor of Technology (DTec)
USA	1975	Westminster College (Utah)	Doctor of Laws (LLD)
France	1976	University of Paris (Sorbonne)	Docteur
USA	1981	Wesleyan College (Georgia)	Dr of Public Administration (DPA)
USA	1982	Westminster College (Missouri)	Doctor of Laws (DL)
England	19 July 1985	University of Kent	Doctor of Laws (LL.D)
Canada	7 June 1991	University of Calgary	Doctor of Laws (LL.D)
England	1994	Goldsmiths, University of London	Honorary Fellow
USA	1994	Bellarmine College (Kentucky)	Doctor of Laws (HLD)
England	21 June 1997	Open University	Doctor of the University (D.Univ)
Wales	1998	University of Wales	Doctor of Laws (LL.D)
England	18 July 2001	University of Greenwich	Doctor of Laws (LL.D)
England	—	Royal College of Organists	Fellow (FRCO)
Canada	—	Royal Canadian College of Organists	Honorary Fellow

=== Awards ===
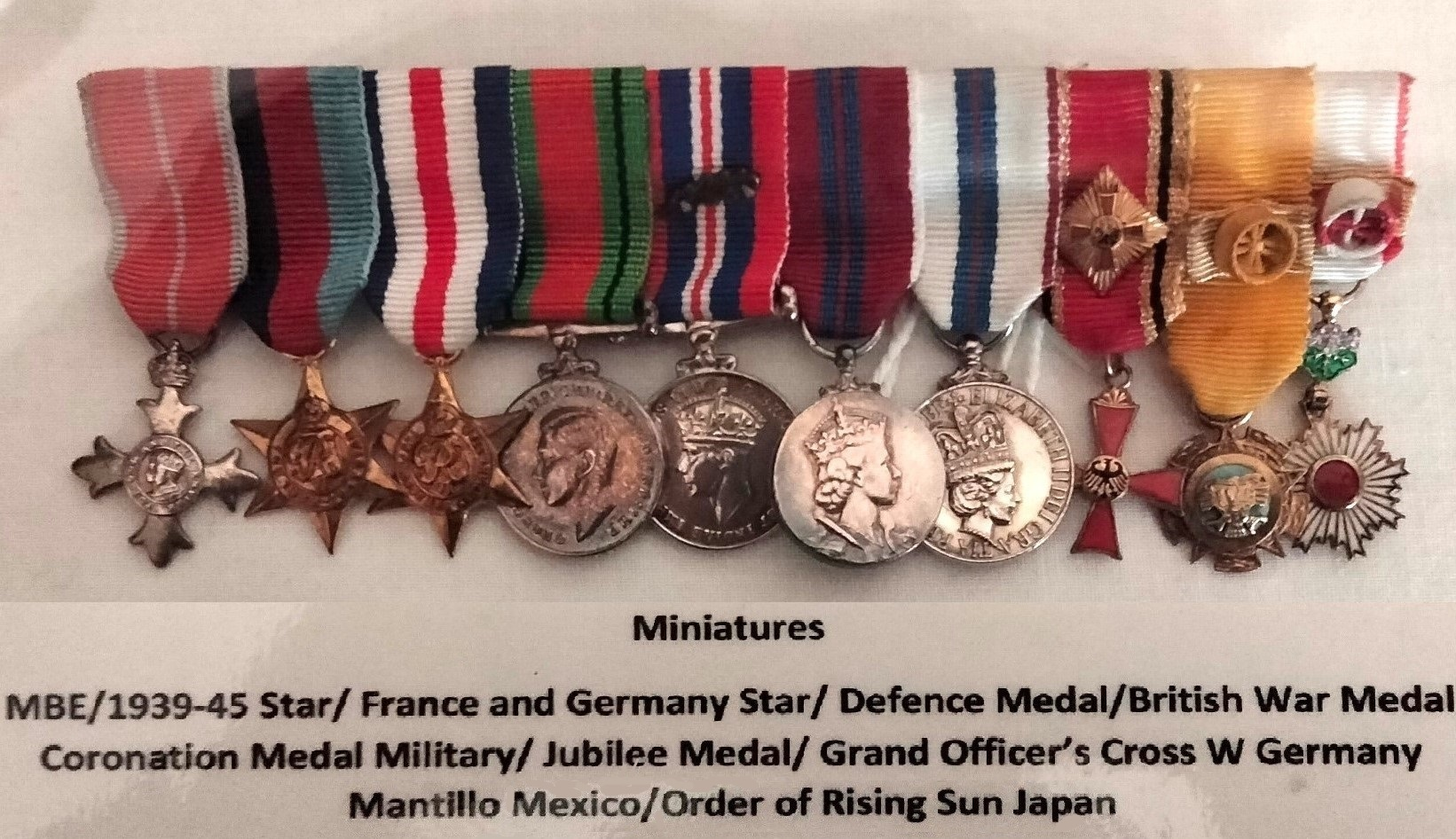
Heath's miniature medals

Including the year of award.

- Order of the Garter (1992)
- Member of the Order of the British Empire, Military Division (MBE) (1946)
- Mentioned in dispatches (1945)
- Order of Merit of the Federal Republic of Germany (1993)
- Order of the Aztec Eagle (1994)
- Order of the Rising Sun, Grand Cordon (1998)
- Bangladesh Liberation War Honour (Bangladesh Muktijuddho Sanmanona) (2012, posthumous award)

== Books by Heath ==
- Heath, Edward (1970). Old World, New Horizons: Britain, Europe, and the Atlantic Alliance. Harvard University Press. ISBN 978-0674492493.
- Heath, Edward (1975). Sailing: A Course of My Life. Stein and Day. ISBN 978-1135465292.
- Heath, Edward (1976). Music: A Joy for Life. Sidgwick & Jackson. ISBN 978-0283983498.
- Heath, Edward (1977). Travels: People and Places in My Life. Sidgwick & Jackson. ISBN 978-0283984143.
- Heath, Edward (1977). The Joy of Christmas: A Selection of Carols. Sidgwick & Jackson. ISBN 978-0195200812.
- Heath, Edward (1998). The Course of My Life. Hodder & Stoughton. ISBN 978-0340708521.

Parliament of the United Kingdom
Preceded by Sir Ashley Bramall	Member of Parliament for Bexley; 1950–1974	Constituency abolished
New constituency	Member of Parliament for Sidcup; 1974–1983	Constituency abolished
New constituency	Member of Parliament for Old Bexley and Sidcup; 1983–2001	Succeeded by Derek Conway
Political offices
Preceded by William Wilkins	Lord Commissioner of the Treasury; 1951–1955	Succeeded by Sir Edward Wakefield
Preceded by Harry Mackeson; Herbert Butcher	Deputy Chief Whip of the House of Commons; 1952–1955; Served alongside: Herbert Butcher (1952–1953)	Succeeded by Martin Redmayne
Preceded by Patrick Buchan-Hepburn	Government Chief Whip in the House of Commons; Parliamentary Secretary to the Treasury; 1955–1959	Succeeded by Martin Redmayne
Preceded by Iain Macleod	Minister of Labour; 1959–1960	Succeeded by The Viscount Blakenham
Preceded by The Viscount Hailsham	Lord Keeper of the Privy Seal; 1960–1963	Succeeded by Selwyn Lloyd
Preceded by Office established	Secretary of State for Industry, Trade and Regional Development; 1963–1964	Office abolished
Preceded by The Baron Erroll	President of the Board of Trade; 1963–1964	Succeeded by Douglas Jay
Preceded by Reginald Maudling	Shadow Chancellor of the Exchequer; 1965	Succeeded by Iain Macleod
Preceded by Alec Douglas-Home	Leader of the Opposition; 1965–1970	Succeeded by Harold Wilson
Preceded by Harold Wilson	Prime Minister of the United Kingdom; 1970–1974	Succeeded by Harold Wilson
Preceded by Harold Wilson	Leader of the Opposition; 1974–1975	Succeeded by Margaret Thatcher
Party political offices
Preceded by Harry Mackeson	Conservative Deputy Chief Whip in the House of Commons; 1952–1955	Succeeded by Martin Redmayne
Preceded by Patrick Buchan-Hepburn	Chief Whip of the Conservative Party; 1955–1959	Succeeded by Martin Redmayne
Preceded by Alec Douglas-Home	Leader of the Conservative Party; 1965–1975	Succeeded by Margaret Thatcher
Honorary titles
Preceded by Bernard Braine	Father of the House; 1992–2001	Succeeded by Tam Dalyell
Awards and achievements
Preceded by Walter Hallstein	Recipient of the Charlemagne Prize; 1963	Succeeded by Antonio Segni
Records
Preceded by Michael Foot	Oldest-sitting member of Parliament; 1992–2001	Succeeded by Piara Khabra
