= Nick Peirce =

English medical doctor and sports physician

Nicholas Sheridan Peirce MBE
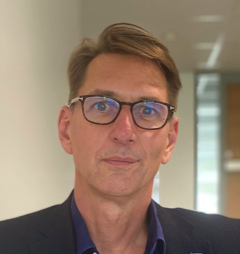
- Citizenship: British
- Education: BMedSci; BMBS; MRCOG; MSc; FISM; FSEM
- Occupation: Chief medical officer
- Employer: England and Wales Cricket Board
- Honours: Member of the Most Excellent Order of the British Empire
- Website: Professor Nicholas S Peirce

Nicholas Sheridan Peirce is an English consultant physician specialising in sports and exercise medicine.

Peirce holds the position of chief medical officer (CMO) for the England and Wales Cricket Board. Additionally, he serves as an Honorary Professor of clinical sports medicine at Loughborough University and is a former columnist for the Guardian newspaper.

== Career ==
He originally trained in family medicine but shifted his focus to sport and exercise medicine in 1995 and completed an MSc in sports medicine. In 2001, he began a two-year Lectureship at the University of Nottingham and a sports medicine fellowship at the Australian Institute of Sport.

His early roles in sports medicine included CMO positions with the World University Games, British Canoeing, and British Rowing. In 1998, after receiving a BASEM travelling scholarship, he undertook a clinical fellowship at the Australian Institute of Sport. Concurrently, he worked with Team GB at the 2000 Summer Olympics in Sydney. Subsequently, he worked with Team GB at the 2004 Summer Olympics in Athens and the Commonwealth Games.

He was appointed as an NHS Consultant at Nottingham University Hospital Trust in 2001 and helped establish regional and national organisations such as the English Institute of Sport at Loughborough University and the National Centre for Sport and Exercise Medicine.

Peirce also served as the team physician for the Lawn Tennis Association's (LTA) Davis Cup team from 2001 to 2006 and Nottingham Forest F.C. from 2001 to 2018.

When Peter Gregory stepped down as CMO for the England cricket team in November 2006, Peirce accompanied the team to the ICC Champions Trophy in India.

During the 2020 pandemic, he worked as a special advisor in sports medicine with Public Health England and contributed to the development of UK guidelines for the safe return of sport. The 2022 Platinum Jubilee Honours list acknowledged his sports contributions, making him a Member of the Most Excellent Order of the British Empire (MBE).

His Ask Dr Nick Column in The Guardian ran from 2008 to 2009 and covered topics ranging from caffeine's impact on performance to the prevalence of eye surgery in sports.
