= Operation Whistle =

Criminal investigation of sexual abuse

Operation Whistle is an investigation by the States of Jersey Police into allegations of historical sexual abuse of children in Jersey. In a press release by the States of Jersey Police, they have stated that it is being carried on under the auspices of Operation Hydrant. It is cooperating with Operation Yewtree due to the involvement of entertainer Jimmy Savile.

BBC reported that the scope of the investigation includes allegations relating to activities at the Haut de la Garenne children's home. Also in August 2015, Sky News reported that Jersey police were investigating allegations against Edward Heath. (Note: The allegations against Heath have since proven to be false, with the accuser Carl Beech being found to have made false accusations against him and other prominent politicians of the 1970s and the police finding no evidence of wrongdoing on Heath's part.) The States of Jersey Police reported on 25 September 2015 that they have established a total number of 32 victims and 60 suspects, most of whom have died; 14 suspects were influential and 16 victims reported being sexually abused by Savile.
