= Family Fund =

- Family Fund
- Headquarters: Alpha Court, Unit 3, Monks Cross Dr, Huntington YO32 9WN
- Services: The UK's largest charity providing grants for families raising disabled or seriously ill children and young people
- Website: https://www.familyfund.org.uk/

Family Fund is a UK based registered charity for disabled children and their families. The Chief Executive of this charity is Cheryl Ward.

Formed in 1973 by the UK Government to give practical help to families with severely disabled and seriously ill children under the age of 18. For over 20 years the Family Fund operated under the wing of the Joseph Rowntree Foundation but in 1996 became an independent charity.

The charity aims to help families with disabled or seriously ill children and young people aged 17 and under to have choices and the opportunity to enjoy ordinary life by giving grants to families on the lowest of incomes to help relieve the stress of everyday life.

The charity operates under its own definition of severe disability and income criteria. The charity aims to help eligible families once every 2 years with grants for things that make life easier and more enjoyable for the disabled child, young person and their family - items such as white goods, outdoor play equipment, computers and holidays.

The national governments of England, Northern Ireland, Scotland and Wales provide grants to the charity, as part of their commitment to disabled children and young people. The charity is the UK's largest grant giving organisation and currently helps around 66,000 families in the UK with around £33 million in grants a year.
