= Peter Gregory (doctor) =

English medical doctor and sports physician

- Years active: 2002 till 2006
- Organization: England cricket team
- Known for: Sports Medicine
- Successor: Nick Peirce
- Website: NHS Profile

Peter Gregory was the team doctor (chief medical officer) for the England cricket team from November 2002 to 15 November 2006.

Gregory was the first person to be appointed to the role of chief medical officer (CMO) by the England and Wales Cricket Board in 2002. He is a general practitioner and holds an MSc in sports and exercise medicine from the University of Nottingham.

Gregory left his post to do voluntary work in Romania.
