= Peter Gregory (academic) =

Peter J. Gregory is a former professor of Global Food Security at the University of Reading where he was also previously dean and pro-vice chancellor until 2005. He was the chief executive of the Scottish Crop Research Institute. He was later chief executive of East Malling Research.

He is an honorary life president of the International Society of Root Research.
