= List of serial rapists =

A serial rapist is someone who commits multiple rapes, whether with multiple victims or a single victim repeatedly over a period of time. This list does not include serial killers who raped their victims, then killed them; only serial rapists who non-fatally attacked their victims and raped them should be included here. This list should include serial rapists with at least three victims. Serial killers who raped at least three victims without murdering them are also included.

Name	Country	Years active	Victims	Notes
Dhu Shanatir	Yemen	c. 517 CE	Unknown	Himyarite king who, according to traditional histories, regularly sodomised young boys at his royal apartments, afterwards sticking a toothpick in their mouths so that everyone would know how he had dishonoured them. His goal was to disgrace and humiliate other males of royal blood so that they would be unable to succeed him as king. In 517 he was stabbed to death in self-defense by an intended victim.
Thomas Thistlewood	Jamaica	1751–1781	138	Plantation owner whose diaries recorded numerous brutalities against his slaves, including a total of 3,852 acts of rape against 138 enslaved women. He began abusing enslaved women within days of beginning work at the "Egypt" plantation in 1751 and continued until 1781, when he developed the syphilis that would eventually kill him.
Marquis de Sade	France	1772–1776	11	French aristocrat notorious for his sexual perversion who was implicated in the rape and sexual torture of multiple women and teenagers of both genders. He largely avoided punishment thanks to his influential connections, but was eventually committed to an asylum at the command of Napoleon Bonaparte and died there in 1814. The term sadism is derived from his name.
Albert Fish	United States	1890–1934	3–100+	Fish was a sadist, pedophile, serial killer, and cannibal who murdered at least three children in New York City in the 1920s. In addition to murders, he claimed to have sexually abused numerous young boys, mostly around the age of 6, in New York from 1890 onwards. The majority of these victims were black and/or intellectually disabled, as Fish felt they would be easier prey, and many were also sexually mutilated. He boasted of having victimized hundreds of children in every state, though it is unclear if he was referring to rapes or murders. Executed in 1936.
Carl Panzram	United States, Angola	1910–1928	20–1,000+	Serial killer and rapist who victimized men and boys of all ages across the United States and in Portuguese Angola. By his own estimation he had committed 21 murders and over a thousand rapes. Executed in 1930.
Georgia Tann	United States	1920–1950	5,000	Child trafficker and suspect serial killer who kindapped, trafficked, and abused an estimated 5,000 children; with at least 19 believed to have been killed. According to "The Baby Thief: The Untold Story of Georgia Tann" by Barbara Bisantz Raymond, Tann had sexually abused the children she had trafficked and kidnapped, including molesting the children herself.
Edith Cadivec	Austria	???–1924	8	Austrian teacher and author, who was arrested in 1924 for sexually abusing eight underage girls (including her own daughter). The testimony of the trial indicates that Cadivec indulged in sex acts with the children and invited paying guests to watch.
Lavrentiy Beria	Soviet Union	1930–1953	Unknown	Leading official in the Soviet Union who serially raped women under threat of execution if they resisted. Number of victims is unknown, although evidence suggests a victim count in the hundreds. Executed for treason in 1953 after a trial during which his sexual crimes were brought to light.
Theodorus van Berkel	United States; Netherlands	1930–1960	14	Dutch machinist who raped a young woman and three young girls in Green Bay and Milwaukee in 1930; sentenced to 15 years imprisonment and later deported to the Netherlands, where he was linked to three murders and ten child molestations from 1941 to 1960; sentenced to 15 years imprisonment and died a free man in 1982.
Ronald Carroll McDonald	United States	1937–1997	8–45+	American man known for playing Santa Claus for over 25 years before confessing to his crimes. McDonald had been a prominent figure in Lake Forest Park, Washington working as a year-round Santa. He volunteered at least six days a week, working with children, including those in the Seattle area hospitals.
Paul Ogorzow	Nazi Germany	1939–1941	31+	Serial killer known as the "S-Bahn Murderer." Executed for the murders of eight women, but also convicted of thirty-one rapes committed before his murder spree.
Clement Freud	United Kingdom	1940s–1960s	3	Anglo-German MP and TV presenter who was posthumously implicated in the sexual abuse of three underage girls between the 1940s and 1960s.
George Joseph Cvek	United States	1940–1941	15–156	Known as "The Aspirin Bandit"; Pennsylvanian who robbed and raped at least 15 women around New York City, and was linked to at least 66 others in Maine and New Orleans. Cvek was nicknamed "The Gentleman Killer" after being convicted of raping and killing Kitty Pappas in the Bronx, for which he was later executed in 1942.
Irma Grese	Nazi Germany	1942–1945	Unknown	Known as "The Hyena of Auschwitz"; female Nazi German SS guard who, confirmed through historical documentation and witness testimony, raped male and female prisoners.
Anneliese Kohlmann	Nazi Germany	1944–1945	Unknown	Female Nazi German SS guard who, confirmed through historical documentation, sexually abused/exploited female prisoners. Contemporary scholarship describe these acts as "rape" due to the power imbalance rendering any consent invalid.
Willi Kimmritz	East Germany	1946–1948	13–45+	Known as "The Horror of the Brandenburg Forest"; robbed and raped women in the forests around Berlin, killing four. To shorten the trial, Kimmritz was only convicted of thirteen rapes and three murders, however, estimates place his total number of victims around 45. He was executed in 1950.
Jimmy Savile	United Kingdom	1955–2009	217–589	British celebrity who sexually abused hundreds of people, mostly children, during a fifty-year period. After Savile's death, an inquiry revealed that he was quite possibly the most prolific sex offender in British history.
Albert DeSalvo	United States	1956–1964	3–16+	Known as "The Measuring Man" and "The Green Man". Serial rapist and serial sexual assailant of women in Boston, Massachusetts, as well as prime suspect of the Boston Strangler murders. Started shortly after his military discharge with a series of molestations of women in their homes, pretending to be a modeling scout to get in their homes and "take their measurements". Was arrested and imprisoned for burglary in 1960, sentenced to less than a year in prison despite confessing to the sexual assaults. Later committed rape of women in their homes, wearing green work uniforms, tying them to their own beds, and raping them at knifepoint. Richard Sproules, who would later be Brockton chief of police, was nearly burglarized by DeSalvo when he came to the door as a motorist. Sproules fired his shotgun to keep DeSalvo from running or breaking in, resulting in his arrest. Represented by F. Lee Bailey, especially when DeSalvo confessed to the Strangler murders with precise and publicly unrevealed details; Bailey tried to argue for an insanity plea, but settled for taking the death penalty off the table. DeSalvo was sentenced to life imprisonment, then murdered in the prison infirmary, with no convictions brought to suspects.
Mike DeBardeleben	United States	1956–1983	4+	Full name James Mitchell DeBardeleben, Jr.; known as "The Mall Passer". Counterfeiter of fake bills across the country to steal the change, to the point of being tracked by the Secret Service. Reportedly also a serial rapist, usually using a ruse of a "plainclothes officer" disguise, then kidnapping and physically and sexually torturing them, often sexually assaulting women with foreign objects out of sexual impotence. The women remembered being forced to call DeBardeleben "Daddy" and were threatened with pictures and tapes of the torture if they told. Police arrested DeBardeleben on charges of counterfeiting, where paraphernalia and photos and audio recordings of raped and tortured women were abundantly found among DeBardeleben's belongings. He was sentenced to life imprisonment for counterfeiting, but police could not definitely connect DeBardeleben to the women in the photographs, let alone identify many of them. A popular theory is DeBardeleben decided whether to blur his and the women's faces in the photos based on whether they were raped and released or they were murdered. DeBardeleben is the prime suspected in murdering Edna Terry McDonald, Jean McPhaul, and Joe Rapini. Also has a preceding criminal record of physical abuse of his mother, physical and sexual abuse of his wives, illegal possession of firearms and drugs, car theft, kidnapping, attempted murder, assault, armed robbery, reckless driving, and sodomy. Died from pneumonia in prison in Butner, North Carolina in 2011.
Edward Paisnel	Jersey	1957–1971	13	Notorious sex offender known as the "Beast of Jersey", terrorised the island for nearly 15 years and was convicted in 1971 of 13 counts of rape, assault and sodomy.
Paul Schäfer	Chile and Germany	1958–2005	28+	Christian minister and cultist founder of Colonia Dignidad who was charged with two rapes in his native Germany, along with another 26 offenses in Chile.
Alton Coleman	United States	1960–1984	8–10+	Spree killer with a long-standing criminal record, starting in 1960. Assisted in a cross-country killing spree with his girlfriend Debra Brown, who was ordered to participate in a particular portion of the crimes. Previous crimes included a series of violent rapes and other sexual abuse, including several girls, three male inmates, an American military servicewoman, and reportedly, his own niece. The charges were pleaded down or acquitted in court, except for one Coleman was to be tried for when the killing spree started. Motives previously cited included horrific abuse, personality disorders and other psychiatric diagnoses, and bullying by peers. Debra had a better upbringing with no previous criminal records, but her efforts turned in Coleman's direction when starting a relationship. Coleman was executed on convictions regarding the spree, and Debra remains in prison.
Cyril Smith	United Kingdom	1960s–1970s	144	Prominent Liberal politician who was posthumously implicated in the physical and sexual abuse of up to 144 young boys at schools and youth hostels during the 1960s and 1970s. It emerged that he was repeatedly investigated and arrested during his lifetime but was never charged. According to Simon Danczuk, the MP for Rochdale where the abuse took place, there is "little doubt" that Smith's abuse included rape.
Sidney Cooke	United Kingdom	1960s–1980s	3–20	Known as "Hissing Sid". One of Britain's worst violent sexual criminals and child sex offenders. Amusement park worker and leader of a gang of pedophiles responsible for procuring and kidnapping boys to drug, gang-rape, and torture in an acquired flat, identified boys including two brothers who were never publicly named. Definitely connected to the murder of one boy and suspected in the murders and disappearances of other boys. Arrested on charges of indecent assault in a bathroom and was later charged on eighteen counts of child sex offenses. Cooke pleaded guilty to half of those charges, bragging about more crimes the police did and did not connect, but refusing to disclose details or discuss it with the police, grieving families, or whomever else it concerns. Public outrage and protests resulted from the revelation of Cooke's syndicate and crimes.
John Allen	United Kingdom	1960s–1995	26	Preyed on victims in Welsh children's homes from the late 1960s to early 1990s. He was convicted of abusing six boys in 1995 and later convicted again in 2014 of 33 sexual offences relating to the abuse of 19 boys and one girl.
Ray Teret	United Kingdom	1960s–1999	8	British radio DJ who was a friend of Jimmy Savile. In 2014, after Saville was revealed to be a serial sex offender, Teret was also investigated and convicted of seven counts of rape committed against children in the 1960s and 70s. In 1999 he was also convicted of statutory rape against a 15 year old. He was cleared of other charges, including for attacks alleged to have been committed with Saville.
Brian Lunn Field	United Kingdom	1960s–2001	3+	Brian Lunn Field was a pedophile and serial offender against young boys. He was convicted and sentenced to life in prison in 2001 for the murder of Roy Tutill, who he had also buggered. He had six other criminal convictions for sexual offences against young boys, including for a sexual assault in the 1970s and two counts of buggery in the early 1980s. He was also convicted for abducting two young boys in his car in 1986 and attempting to rape them, but they managed to escape after jumping from the car. He is the prime suspect in the case of two boys, Patrick Warren and David Spencer who vanished from the street in Solihull in December 1996 when he was driving around in a van in the area. He is also suspected of another murder of a boy in the area in 1984. Died in prison in February 2024.
Robert Garrow	United States	1961–1973	3+	Serial rapist of women and girls in New York, with additional records of crimes including assault, kidnapping, and attempted rape. Jumped bail during a trial after the rapes of two girls, starting a spree of killings, rapes, and assaults that lasted for 18 days. Was shot by a conservation officer in a park and detained, being found guilty on all charges. Attempted to escape again with a gun smuggled in by his son, but was shot dead when found by corrections officers. His lawyers were indicted in the "Buried Bodies Case", in which Garrow disclosed the locations of two people he murdered under attorney-client privilege. A motion to dismiss the indictment was granted.
Fred West	United Kingdom	1961–1992	8+	Serial killer and rapist along with his accomplice and second wife, Rosemary West. Sexual predator and sadist since early youth, guilty of raping and brutalizing dozens women and girls, ones who were identified including his sister, his first wife, his daughters, his niece, and nannies and borders in his family's home, who were sexually assaulted, tortured, degraded, and even prostituted from the household. One woman, Caroline Owens, was subjected to sexual harassment, then physical and sexual violence in captivity, reporting the crimes when she escaped. The couple pleaded guilty to lesser charges when she struggled to testify, and the Wests were only meagerly fined in euros. Arrested on charges of rape regarding the youngest daughter of the family, Fred was helpless to prevent the police from eventually getting warrants to search the Wests' "House of Horrors", leading to unearthing the remains of nine women and girls either Fred or Rosemary murdered, including two daughters. Fred was also conclusive tied to three other murders: his ex-wife, a teenager who lived in his caravan, and a café waitress Fred had stalked who was never found dead. After Rosemary was arrested, Fred gave full confessions in hopes she would be released, then committed suicide by hanging. Rosemary was charged and convicted on felony charges regarding the rapes, tortures, murders, and domestic abuse, and was incarcerated.
Francis Evrard	France; Belgium	1962–2007	9	French-Belgian pedophile who sexually abused young boys in both countries, who admitted to about 40 assaults. Following a notorious abduction, kidnapping and rape of a 5-year-old boy from his hometown of Roubaix in 2007, Evrard was sentenced to 30 years' imprisonment. His case led to a renewal on the debate concerning the treatment of sex offenders in France.
Stewart Murray Wilson	New Zealand	1962–2013	16+	Recidivist rapist and sex offender of women and girls with decades of criminal history. He barely received rehabilitation and was released in 2012 under the strictest conditions of a New Zealand inmate. Was recalled in 2013 over a phone call outside of his requirements, later convicted of additional sex crimes. Died at the prison hospital from natural causes in 2021.
Léopold Dion	Canada	1963	23	Serial rapist of 21 boys, as well as a female schoolteacher who was gang-raped, stabbed, and left for dead with the collaboration of Dion's brother. Later became a serial killer of boys who were lured under the same ruses as his adult female victim, which was a photographer. Was arrested within a month of the killings taking place, while bailed out after raping the schoolteacher, thanks to a report from an escaped boy Dion tried to assault. Confessed after a month in prison and directed police to the four boys who were murdered. Convicted and sentence to death, which was commuted to life imprisonment when Canada abolished capital punishment in the nation. Stabbed to death in 1972 by another inmate found not guilty by reason of insanity.
Christopher Wilder	Australia; United States	1963–1984	7+	Known as "The Beauty Queen Killer" from targeting young, pretty women and girls under the guise as a modelling photographer. Australian sexual predator guilty of an extensive list of sex offenses, in Australia and the United States (he was a dual citizen), ranging from sexual harassment to sexual assaults, including the gang-rape of a teenager in Australia and three oral rapes of a woman and two girls in Florida. While awaiting trial, Wilder went on a killing spree across the U.S., raping, torturing, and murdering numerous women and girls over six weeks in 1984. One woman and two girls survived; one being held hostage for a prolonged period of time. Wilder was shot dead in a struggle with two state troopers over his Colt revolver. Suspected of numerous other disappearances and murders of other women and girls, being exonerated from some of these posthumously.
William Vahey	United States; Nicaragua; United Kingdom	1963–2014	90+	American teacher with a repertoire of international schools. Was first convicted and put on the sex offense registry for child molestation as a Boy Scout starting at age 14. After being released from prison, Vahey traveled abroad and sexually abused more boys who were students at the schools, feeding them Oreo cookies with sleeping medicine in them and making child pornography while molesting the boys. Vahey did not sign the registry, which is how the schools never found out records. Vahey allegedly molested boys for all his life, having been previously molested as a child, by his own account. Because of barely being penalized, despite evidence of child pornography recovered in raids in Nicaragua and London, Vahey fled back to America and committed suicide by stabbing in the chest while in Minnesota, after a previously failed attempted years before in Nicaragua, dying at age 64. Dozens of victims and their families filed lawsuits and demanded compensation. Vahey was married and had two adult children.
Nathaniel Bar-Jonah	United States	1964–1999	7+	Born David Paul Brown. Severely dangerous, violent child predator dating back to his youth, ranging kidnappings, rapes, violent assaults, attempted murders, and eventual convictions regarding the disappearance and suspected murder of Zach Ramsey. He is suspected of killing multiple children, even of cannibalism of their remains after finding "recipes" among numerous other documented evidence of his crimes and predispositions against him. Died in 2008 from heart problems attributed to poor health and overeating. Ramsey is declared legally dead in absentia as of 2011.
Willie Crain Jr.	United States	Mid-1960s–1980s	8+	American sex offender who raped and molested at least eight young girls from the mid-1960s to 1980s, and was sentenced to 20 years in prison for five child molestation charges. Released on probation after serving 6 1/2 years out of his prison term. Later sentenced to death for kidnapping and murdering a seven-year-old girl in 1998.
William Goad	United Kingdom	1965–2004	14	Paedophile millionaire businessman from Plymouth who repeatedly abused boys and who was convicted of 14 counts of sexual assault (statutory rape) in 2004. His first known offence was committed in 1965. He once boasted of beating his own "record" of sexually abusing 142 boys in a year.
Robert Anderson	United States	1966–2003	1,050+	General and sports physician of the University of Michigan, died in 2008 with no criminal record. During his long career as a physician, he was alleged to have raped over a thousand men and women during routine medical exams. The university reached a settlement of $490 million with 1050 victims in 2022.
Valery Devyatyorov	Soviet Union	1967–1968	31+	Known as "The Alma-Ata Strangler"; sent away to live with relatives after raping a young woman in his native Yakutia; proceeded to rape at least 30 additional young girls and women, killing at least three; suspected of raping more than 100 women; executed in 1968.
Joro the Paver	Bulgaria	1968	6–7	Active in Sofia's Konyovitsa neighborhood, Joro the Paver earned his nickname from the handkerchiefs he left on pavements next to the victims. As a result of one of his attacks, one victim died from her injuries in hospital. A deaf-mute named Milcho Milanov, from Rakita, was initially convicted and served time for the crimes, but later released due to lack of evidence. Joro the Paver is not to be confused with Georgi Yordanov known as Joro the Paver, the Second.
Larry Fisher	Canada	1968–1980	9	Fisher was responsible for the 1969 rape and murder of Gail Miller, for which David Milgaard was wrongly convicted and served 23 years in prison. He served time in prison for six rapes committed in Saskatoon and Winnipeg, and for another committed in North Battleford in 1980. He had also raped his wife Linda in 1968.
Shlomo Haliva	Israel	1969–1975	7	Known as "The Weeping Rapist"; sexually assaulted and raped at least seven women around Acre, Israel and murdered one in Netanya; suspected of other rapes and possibly four additional murders; sentenced to life imprisonment, but expected to be released on parole in 2024.
Roy Norris	United States	1969–1979	3	One of the two “Toolbox Killers” along with Lawrence Bittaker, severely dangerous and violent rapists, torturers, and murderers working together after their releases from the prison they met in. Killed five girls and young women before their arrests. Norris also had a history of three rapes and one attempted rape, not all of them resulting in convictions.
Andre Rand	United States	1969–1987	2–6+	Child kidnapper, sex offender, and suspected serial killer from Staten Island, the United States. May have been the source of the urban legend of "Cropsey".
Adrian Schwartz	Israel	1969–1990	8–14	Former backgammon champion who was convicted of two child sex offences in the Central District and Jerusalem. First sex offenses conviction was around two decades earlier, before entering high stakes competitions of backgammon and chess. Acquitted of six other charges of child rape, and suspected of around seven more child rapes. First convict to be retried after being linked with a rape via DNA; sentenced to 20 years imprisonment, and released under house arrest in 2019. The investigative a judicial systems in the regional jurisdiction have been repeatedly scrutinized for reported struggles and inabilities to follow protocol and charge and prosecute based on more conclusive evidence than circumstantial, resulting in years of legal battles between Schwartz and agencies, and agencies between each other.
Rosemary West	United Kingdom	1969–1994	11+	Serial killer, rapist and co-conspirator with her husband Fred West. The couple sexually abused their daughters, their niece, and female boarders in their house, among dozens of other women and girls who were never identified. Rosemary, known as Rose, worked as a prostitute and enjoyed inflicting intense pain on unwitting victims, having a propensity for sexually aggression with female partners. She also physically and sexually abused the family's children, and had even sexually abused her brothers. After a woman named Caroline Owens was imprisoned, raped, and tortured in captivity by the couple and later took the couple to trial when she escaped, the couple pleaded guilty to lesser charges and were only fined when she was too traumatized to testify. The couple them escalated to sexually motivated murders of women and girls the couple raped and tortured, before their remains were buried in the cellar and garden of the property, as well as two daughters. Fred was arrested for raping the youngest daughter, and Rose was charged as well when a search warrant revealed nine dead women on the property, with Fred being tied later to three other murders. Rose would often kill in fits of rage, including murders of her stepdaughter and a boarder at the house. Rose remains incarcerated after convictions regarding the couple's crimes. Fred claimed primary responsibility for the crimes before hanging himself dead in his cell.
Georgi Yordanov	Bulgaria	1970s	10	In the beginning of the 1970s, a serial rapist, known as "Joro the Paver, the Second", raped ten victims and committed a double murder. In 1975, the perpetrator Georgi Yordanov was captured, sentenced to death and subsequently executed by firing squad.
Ralph Rowe	Canada	1970s–1980s	60–500	One of Canada's worst pedophiles. Sexually assaulted hundreds of indigenous Canadian children, specifically boys, during careers as an Anglican Church of Canada priest, Ontario Provincial Police official, and Boy Scout leader. Sentenced to five years in prison due to a plea bargain.
John Taylor	United Kingdom	1970s–2001	11+	Known mostly for the murder of Leanne Tiernan, Leeds man John Taylor was also further convicted in 2003 of two rapes in the city in 1988 and 1989 respectively. In 2018 he was convicted of 16 further historical offences, including at least nine rapes and sexual offences. He is suspected of many other offences.
Geoffrey Evans and John Shaw	United Kingdom; Ireland	Early 1970s–1976	3	Pair of career criminals who together raped three women in England before fleeing to Ireland in 1974 to escape being arrested and charged. While on the run in Ireland, and while the UK authorities were seeking their extradition, they raped and murdered two women and were imprisoned in the country. The two are known to have planned to rape and kill one woman each week.
Gabriel Matzneff	France, Asia	1970s–1985	Unknown	French writer who admitted in multiple autobiographies and interviews to having had sexual intercourse with an undisclosed number of very young children, mostly boys, in France and Asia during the 1970s and 1980s. No efforts were made to criminally charge him until 2020, when he was investigated for the rape of a child under 15, but the statute of limitations meant he could not be prosecuted.
John Albert Taylor	United States	1970s–1989	5+	Convicted and sentenced to death for the rape and murder of Charla King in 1989 on the girl's 12th birthday. Was previously imprisoned for stabbing his stepfather and raping and sodomizing numerous girls, including his sister and half-sister. Was in and out of prison for petty crimes, then controversially paroled after being imprisoned for parole violations, being acquitted of other charges of burglary, robbery, and sexual assault. He returned to live with his father's family, where he raped and strangled Charla. Her mother Sherron moved because her neighbors did not intervene to save her daughter's life. Taylor was found guilty of rape and murder in the first and sentenced to death, Taylor choosing an execution by firing squad while proclaiming innocence in 1996.
Gene Morrison	United Kingdom	1970s–2007	3	Fraudulent forensic detective who for three decades operated in Hyde, Greater Manchester and who regularly gave phony evidence at criminal trials under the title "Doctor". He was eventually revealed to be a fraud and in 2009 he was convicted of a series of sexual offences against children between the 1970s and 2007, including three rapes.
Gary Glitter	United Kingdom; Cambodia; Vietnam	1970s–2000s	18+	Disgraced British glam rock icon with long histories of repeated convictions, deportations, and violations of releases on parole pertaining to international sexual assaults and exploitation of prepubescent and teenage girls.
Mohamed Al-Fayed	United Kingdom	1970s–2014	20–200+	Egyptian billionaire and businessman who owned Harrods, a luxury department store. Posthumously accused of raping over 200 women.
Melvin Carter	United States	1971–1980	11	Known as the "College Terrace Rapist"; raped women at knifepoint in College Terrace, Palo Alto, California; confessed to over 100 rapes in multiple cities across California.
Eddie Mosley	United States	1971–1987	43	Recidivist serial killer and rapist in the state of Florida. Originally tied to a series of 150 kidnappings and rapes of women and girls, being conclusively tied to 43 women and girls being raped by their identification. Was convicted and served time before being released, before extending his criminal record, including to eight murders of women and girls being raped and murdered. Mosley was arrested on theft charges and eventually matched by DNA evidence. Was found not competent to stand trial due to diminished capacity and mental instability and was repeatedly switched between correctional institutions, later being tied to more murdered women and girls, including two separate murders where two separate men were wrongfully convicted and eventually exonerated after Mosley's confirmed culpability. Had increasing health issues in the last decade of his life and eventually died from COVID-19 in 2020.
John Svahlstedt	Sweden	1971–2013	22	Known as the "Södermannen"; raped and assaulted women in Södermalm and Haga during the 1970s and 1980s; after release, arrested again in 2013 for the rape of a child; sentenced to four years' imprisonment.
Green Vega Rapists	United States	1972	7+	Gang of serial rapists active in the Washington, D.C. and Maryland area in the early 1970s. Name derived from the victims being lured into a green Chevrolet Vega before being robbed and sexually assaulted at gunpoint.
Scott Erskine	United States	c. 1972-1993	8+	A recidivist rapist sentenced to death by the state of California for the 1993 double rapes and strangulations of a 13-year-old boy and an 8-year-old boy, and also sentenced to a life without parole term by the state of Florida for the 1989 rape and drowning of a 26-year-old woman. Erskine opportunistically and indiscriminately preyed on male and female adults and children alike, and his earliest known offenses occurred when he was approximately 10 years old. At least seven of Erskine's surviving victims were identified by court documents, which included his younger sister, her 10-year-old friend he reportedly raped inside a wooden fort, a 12-year-old girl and a 27-year-old woman he attacked at knifepoint on the same day, a 14-year-old boy he sodomized next to a school, another inmate he orally copulated while incarcerated for the 14-year-old boy's sexual assault, and a woman he kidnapped and held captive in a motel room. In 2020, Erskine died of COVID related complications on death row.
Andrzej Kunowski	Poland; United Kingdom	1972–2001	27	Known as "The Beast of Mława"; sexually assaulted young girls in and around Warsaw; fled to London, England in 1997, where he murdered a young girl and was sentenced to life imprisonment; suspect in three other murders in both countries; died of heart failure in 2009.
Phillip Garrido	United States	1972–2009	3	One of two kidnappers, along with his wife Nancy, of Jaycee Lee Dugard, who was held captive and repeatedly raped over the course of eighteen years, starting in 1991. She was rescued in 2009, along with her two daughters conceived from the rapes, giving up for adoption at least one other child also conceived during Jaycee's captivity. Also guilty of the kidnappings and repeated rapes of a teenager and a young woman, not being arrested the first time when the girl did not testify, but served a reduction of a fifty-year federal prison sentence. Met Nancy when she visited her uncle in prison, later marrying before his release and recruiting her as his accomplice.
São Paulo Monster	Brazil	1973	3	Serial pedophile rapist who attacked three girls in São Paulo, Brazil at the Bari and Pari regions. Unsuccessfully attempted to rape other girls. Remains unidentified and with an unknown criminal status.
Joseph Clarence Smith Jr.	United States	1973	3+	Serial rapist who attacked three female hitchhikers between 1973 and 1976, and also sentenced to death for two further rape-murders of female hitchhikers.
Frank Beck	United Kingdom	1973–1976	100+	Prolific abuser at the centre of Britain's largest inquiry into institutional child abuse. Implicated in the torture and sexual abuse of over one hundred children in care homes in Leicestershire where he served as officer-in-charge during the 1970s. Several of his victims went on to sexually abuse children themselves. Died at HMP Whitemoor while serving six life sentences in 1994.
Stephen Collins	United States	1973–1994	3	Former actor, confessed to sexually assaulting three women when they were underage once a police investigation into a tape of his confession was publicly announced.
Clarence Alligood	United States	1974	3+	North Carolina prison guard responsible sexually harassing and raping numerous female inmates, bribing them with small privileges such as snacks, magazines, cigarettes, and even false promises of freedom. Killed by Joan Little on August 27, 1974, with the same ice pick Alligood had used to threaten Joan while orally raping her. She escaped, hid out with an elderly black man, and later turned herself in when police were ordered to kill her on sight. Feminist and civil rights advocates widely supported her defense of necessary killing by self-defense, which was confirmed in Alligood's autopsy. The emotional testimony of her, her lawyer Karen Bethea-Shields, and several other women whom Alligood had also raped, shocked the jury and judge enough for Little to be the first woman in America acquitted of murder on the grounds of self-defense against sexual violence, let alone the first black woman who killed a white assailant/rapist on such grounds.
Peter Samuel Cook	United Kingdom	1974–1975	6	Serial rapist who attacked women in Cambridge, England and so became known in the press as the Cambridge Rapist. He was active between October 1974 and April 1975, and was also called the 'hooded rapist' because of a distinctive leather mask he wore while carrying out his crimes.
Billy Milligan	United States	1975–1977	4	Known as "The Campus Rapist". Raped four women, including three on the campus of Ohio State University; was not convicted on grounds of insanity when revealed to have an extreme case of dissociative identity disorder, with over a dozen identified personalities, including one attributed to the rapes. Milligan was studied for years while institutionalized, with findings reporting Milligan had alters since an early age, the disorder partly being attributed to Milligan's father grappling with substance abuse and gambling, eventually committing suicide after at least one failed attempt. Was released and briefly disappeared, until being found to have died from cancer. A film production is in the works based on Milligan's crimes, and a documentary reveals Milligan confessed to murder, and has since been subsequently linked to two murders.
Samuel Christopher Hawkins	United States	1975–1977	30–40+	Known as "The Traveling Rapist"; itinerant butcher and preacher who broke into homes and raped white women in order to exact revenge on white people for their injustices against African-Americans; linked to two murders in Texas and between 30 and 40 rapes in Texas, Oklahoma, Florida and Colorado. Sentenced to death for the murders and ultimately executed in 1995.
John Lambe	United Kingdom	1975–1980	12	Known as the "M5 Rapist"; builder and lorry driver who raped women across the M5 motorway, reportedly as a way to get at the police force, which had gotten him convicted him of a burglary charge. Sentenced to life imprisonment.
John Brennan Crutchley	United States	1975–1985	3+	Known as "The Vampire Rapist". Security system engineer convicted of the kidnapping, rape, and nonfatal exsanguination by blood draws of Laura Murphy. Also has a history of raping intimate partners, women and men, reportedly including his wife. Suspected in as many as thirty murders of women and girls across the United States. Was released, then returned to prison on marijuana possession and denied parole under the three strikes law. Died by suicide in 2002.
Peter Moore	United Kingdom	1975–1995	39	British gay serial killer who murdered four men at random in north Wales in 1995, but who was also convicted of 39 sex attacks on men across Merseyside and north Wales over the proceeding 20 years.
Donald Blom	United States	1975–1998	5+	Convicted of the murder of Katie Poitier, and suspected of murdering other women and girls. Was a registered sex offender from at least five kidnappings and sexual assaults and one kidnapping and attempted rape of two girls, which preceded Blom moving repeatedly and using aliases after each crime.
Joseph James DeAngelo	United States	1976–1979	51	Serial rapist, murderer, burglar, and former police officer who committed at least 13 murders, 50 rapes, and over 100 burglaries in the 1970s and 1980s. He carried out three crime sprees, each of which spawned a different nickname in the press. His known offenses began series of burglaries which culminated in a murder, and he became known as the "Visalia Ransacker" during this spree. He then moved to the Sacramento area, where he carried out a serial rape spree and became known as the East Area Rapist before moving to Southern California and committed a series of murders, often accompanied with sexual assaults, becoming known as the Original Night Stalker. He later became known as the EARONS (East Area Rapist/Original Night Stalker) and the Golden State Killer. He was arrested in 2018 and sentenced to life imprisonment after pleading guilty to 13 murders. As required by his plea deal, he also admitted to the rapes, which could not be prosecuted due to the statute of limitations.
Gary Heidnik	United States	1976–1987	8	Known as "Brother Bishop". Falsely imprisoned and repeatedly raped and tortured eight women, including his ex-wife and his previous girlfriend's sister, killing two of them. Primarily targeted black-American women in their teens and young adult years, and obsessed with holding a "harem" of women captive to subjugate them from violence and degradation. Was arrested when one woman tricked Heidnik into letting her escaping, running to her boyfriend and calling the police. Executed by lethal injection in 1999.
Paul Hickson	United Kingdom; France	1976–1992	3+	British Olympic swimming coach and serial rapist and recidivist predator of girls and women under his instruction. Was arrested in 1994 after absconding from charges in France and convicted and sentenced to life imprisonment, with a rejection of parole in 2002.
David Smith	United Kingdom	1976–1999	3	Murderer of prostitutes who infamously was acquitted of a murder of a sex worker in 1993 only to go on to murder another. Convicted of raping a young mother in front of her children in 1976. He committed two other attempted rapes.
Erik Andersen	Norway	1976–2008	60	Serial molester and oral rapist of boys across Norway, known as "The Pocket Man" or "The Bandage Man" for tricking boys to reach through a hole in his pocket or up his pant leg. Convicted of sexually abusing and assaulting 60 boys by frotteurism and oral rape, but has only admitted to sexually assaulting 20 boys, despite Norwegian police tying Andersen to around 160 cases spanning decades across the country. Sweden also investigated Andersen briefly on suspicion of a child sex crime in Svinesund. Andersen was sentenced to preventative detention, but was released in 2014.
Thomas Grettenberg	United States	1977	10	Known as the "Austin Choker"; attacked and sexually assaulted predominantly Jewish co-eds at the University of Texas, choking them into unconsciousness before raping them; suspected of 24 rapes in total; died in prison from cancer in 1989.
Donald Andrew Bess Jr.	United States	1977–1985	3	Convicted in the murder of Angela Samota, raping her in her apartment before stabbing her heart. The rape and murder was committed in 1984, with Bess being tried and convicted in 2010 after being identified decades later. Bess was found out to have raped three other women, each woman being tricked into Bess coming in before being brutally forced upon. The first reported woman Bess raped never saw charges at the time, and the second woman did report, leading to Bess' conviction. Bess was paroled, murdering Angela Samota and raping yet another woman once released. Bess was convicted and sentenced to life in prison after committing the final rape, where Bess was at the time of being identified as the murderer. Bess' ex-wife also reported she and her daughter were repeatedly abused by Bess before she and Bess divorced. Bess was sentenced to death for Samota's murder but died in prison while awaiting execution in October 2022.
Peter Ball	United Kingdom	1977–1992	20	Church of England bishop and co-founder of Community of the Glorious Ascension, with his twin brother, bishop Michael Ball. Confessed to sexually assaulting 18 boys and young men during his tenure, with two additional charges regarding another boy and another man on file if needed. Released on license in 2017; died from a fall in 2019.
James Edward Wood	United States	1977–1993	3	Violent sex offender who confessed to raping at least ten women in various states, but was convicted of only three in Louisiana and Idaho from 1977 to 1993. He was later convicted and sentenced to death for the murder of an 11-year-old girl in Idaho, and was suspected in other killings in Louisiana, but died on Death Row in 2004.
Robert Hohenberger	United States	1978	4	Former California police deputy and kidnapper who raped women in several counties at gunpoint; suspect in the murders of five teenagers in Morgan City, Louisiana, committed between March and May 1978. Committed suicide to avoid arrest.
Todd Hodne	United States	1978–1979	12	Penn State University linebacker in local college football arrested and convicted on charges regarding a spree of raping and attempting to rape twelve women in the city. Women gave accounts of being tied, often with their own clothes, violently raped at knifepoint, often robbed of their money, and even witnesses were attacked. Evidence showed Hodne stalked each woman beforehand, calling them based on personal ads, and breaking into their homes to hide before attacking when the assaults happened within their residences. Hodne also had records of other crimes and showed other signs of violence, including throwing a knife in the direction of a teammate and robbery. Part of Hodne's rape spree was while not being remanded after one conviction on a charge of rape. Hodne pleaded guilty to additional charges and served approximately six years, with the parole board unanimously voting to release Hodne despite a letter from the prosecutor vehemently fighting the verdict with graphic details of Hodne's rapes. Hodne tried to rob a cab driver, Jeffrey Hirsch, and broke Hirsch's neck when Hirsch fought back. Hodne fled and was caught by a K-9 unit, then was charged, tried, and convicted of Hirsch's murder after his life support was turned off. Hodne admitted the murder was not self-defense at his only parole hearing. Hodne died of cancer in 2020. ESPN published an investigative report in 2022 to spread awareness of Hodne's crimes, in retaliation over the revelation of football coach Jerry Sandusky sexually abusing boys and men in the community, which were ignored and covered up by staff and university officials, most notably fellow coach Joe Paterno. Paterno also stymied investigations into Hodne, and both Hodne and Sandusky shared attendance periods at the university. A short documentary, Betsy & Irv, was released to detail the friendship of Betsy Sailor, a woman who was raped by Hodne while she was a young woman, and Irv Pankey, one of Hodne's teammates who came to support Betsy throughout her testimony against Hodne and collaborated with her to fight for justice.
Kevin Coe	United States	1978–1981	43	Known as the "South Hill Rapist"; former Las Vegas radio announcer who sexually assaulted and injured women in Spokane, Washington, ramming his fist down the victims' mouths or throats; sentenced to life imprisonment. Blended in with the vigilante groups trying to capture him to avoid suspicion. His mother, Ruth Coe, was convicted of trying to hire a hitman to kill the judge and prosecutor on Coe's trial.
José Antonio Rodríguez Vega	Spain	1978–1988	3+	Known as "The Motorcycle Rapist" and "The Vespa Rapist". Guilty of rapes and attempted rapes of women in Spain, but with a reduced sentence for the crimes due to manipulation of the women who were attacked and the court system. Also physically and sexually abused his second wife. Later escalated to rapes and murders of a confirmed 16 elderly women out of a projected obsession to rape his own mother Vega never fulfilled. Was arrested and known as "El Mataviejas", or "The Old Lady Killer". Stabbed to death over 100 times by two inmates in 2002, and would have been up for parole about six years later.
Graeme Joblin	New Zealand	1978–2008	10	A former teacher and busker, Joblin would ply underaged boys with alcohol and cannabis, and then sexually molest them. In 2012, he was sentenced to a prison term of 20 years, with a non-parole period of nine years. As of 2025, he is still incarcerated.
Paul Taylor	United Kingdom	1979	3	Paul Taylor, the murderer of Sally Ann McGrath in Peterborough in July 1979, also raped three separate women in the months leading up to the killing in the area. He was not convicted of the crimes until 2012. After the offences, he moved to Fareham, Hampshire with his wife and started a new life as a "charismatic and womanizing" builder.
House for Sale rapist	United Kingdom	1979–1980	20	An unidentified rapist who targeted women in homes for sale in the west Midlands in 1979 and 1980. 20 women were assaulted and raped in properties in the area, and no one was ever arrested for the crimes. Police suspect that John Cannan (himself a serial rapist in his own right) was responsible for these offences, and that he began committing them after his marriage began to fail. The rapes stopped in early 1980 when Cannan began a new relationship with a woman named Sharon Major. Detectives noted the offences bore all the hallmarks of Cannan's later crimes and also noted the similarities to the Suzy Lamplugh case, in which he is the prime suspect (Lamplugh was an estate agent).
Jon B. Simonis	United States	1979–1981	80+	Dubbed "The Ski Mask Rapist", Jon B. Simonis would break into homes, steal property, and rape the women inside as he wore a ski mask. If others were in the home, he would make them watch. He became the most wanted sex offender in the country. The FBI Behavioral Science Unit created a profile of Simonis that ultimately led to his capture. Overall, he confessed to over 80 rapes and was prosecuted in Louisiana. His confession led to the exoneration of two men. He was given 21 life sentences and is currently serving his time in Louisiana State Penitentiary.
John Cannan	United Kingdom	1979–1987	5+	Cannan is infamous for the 1987 murder of Shirley Banks and for being suspected of being responsible for the murder of Suzy Lamplugh, who disappeared in 1986 and has never been found. He is also suspected of another abduction and murder and has been convicted of three separate rapes and two attempted rapes. He is also suspected to be the unidentified "House for sale rapist" (who has their own entry on this list), who committed 20 attacks on women in homes for sale between 1979 and 1980, meaning he may have raped at least 25 women. He will be eligible for parole in 2022.
Dominic Devine	United Kingdom	1979–1987	4–8	Known as the "Beast of Ibrox", Devine was responsible for a series of attacks against women in the Glasgow area in the 1980s, including at least four rapes and one attempted rape. He has been linked to eight rapes in total, although one police detective who helped to capture him speculated that he "may have carried out other rapes which the victims were too frightened to report".
Richard Strauss	United States	1979–1998	47	Athletic physician at Ohio State University responsible for countless sexual assaults by molestation and rape of men and boys. Reports started at the university from 1979 to 1996, where Strauss was reported for excessive genital handling of athletes and other sexual assault, as well as voyeurism in shower rooms, saunas, and locker rooms, along with other staff and even students, where there would be masturbation and spying through peepholes. Strauss was placed on leave and later fired, but shortly after opened a private clinic to molest and rape more boys and men who came as patients. Strauss died by suicide in 2005 after reported chronic medical problems. The full compilation of reports revealed 1,430 molestations and 47 rapes were committed by Strauss that were rebuffed and buried at Ohio State.
Luc Tangorre	France	1979–2019	10	Known as the "Marseille Southern Districts Rapist"; assaulted ten women and children, possibly more, in the span of a few decades. Tangorre was partially exonerated for his first series of rapes, but was later reconvicted after raping two American students. He was given an additional three and a half years for raping three minors between 2012 and 2019, and is due to stand trial for another such rape in Lyon from 2018.
Ronnie Shelton	United States	1980s	30	Known as "The West Side Rapist"; broke into homes in Cleveland, Ohio and raped the inhabitants; may have been responsible for over 50 rapes. Committed suicide in prison in 2018.
Paul Callow	Canada	1980s	5	Known as the "Balcony Rapist"; after stalking his victims, he would break into their homes in Toronto by climbing onto balconies or entering through broken windows or doors; his last victim later successfully sued the Toronto police for their inaction regarding the rapist; Callow received a 20-year-to-life sentence, but was released in 2007.
Jonathan King	United Kingdom	1980s	5	Music mogul and paedophile who lured teenage boys to his home before having sex with them. A later trial in 2018 resulted in King's acquittal on eighteen further charges.
James Lloyd	United Kingdom	1980s	4	For a period of a least four years during the 1980s, a man violently attacked and raped at least four lone women and attempted to assault at least two others in the Rotherham area. His victims were aged between 18 and 54 and were typically attacked during the early hours of the morning while returning from a night out. In April 2006, Lloyd was arrested and charged. He pleaded guilty to four rapes and two attempted rapes in July 2006, but denied responsibility for one other rape.
Ronald Henry Stewart	United States	1980s	3+	Serial rapist of numerous women in Mississippi and Florida, specifically in Harrison County and Broward County, accordingly. Was arrested and convicted of the murder of Regina Harrison in Hollywood, Florida, due to resembling a composite sketch and testimony of a witness. Took a nolo contendere plea to 50 years in prison to avoid the death penalty, the sentences consecutive with sentencing for the rapes. Died in prison from cancer in 2008. Was posthumously exonerated after the real killer, serial killer Jack Harold Jones, left a written confession behind shortly before his execution in April 2017. Jones' exhumation and DNA testing, as announced in February 2019, was a match and proved Jones' guilt, exonerating Stewart and opening the door for vacating his conviction.
Michael Guider	Australia	1980s–1995	13+	Pleaded guilty to the disappearance and murder of Samantha Knight, and is the prime suspect in the disappearance and presumed murder of Renee Aitken. Was already in prison for drugging and sexually assaulting children he babysat for women he knew. Was paroled, but violated his terms with possession of child pornography and was imprisoned again.
Somsak Ponnarai	Laos; Thailand	1980s–1995	4+	Known as "The Rapist from the Mekong Basin"; Laotian national who self-admittedly raped numerous women in his native country and supposedly killed two; fled abroad to Thailand, where he raped a tricycle driver and killed a 15-year-old teenager in 1995; sentenced to death for the latter crimes and executed in 1999.
Alun Kyte	United Kingdom	1980s–1997	4+	Kyte, convicted of the rape-murders of two women and suspected in at least eleven more, was also convicted of raping a woman in Weston-super-Mare in 1997. In 2023 he was convicted of historic sexual offences relating to the rape of young boys during the 1980s.
Randy Comeaux	United States	1980s–1999	14	Known as "The South Side Rapist". A former sheriff's deputy at the police department in Lafayette, Louisiana and a confessed serial rapist of fourteen women. Ernest "Randy" Comeaux would threaten women with his service gun while raping them, leaving little to no forensic evidence behind at the scene. The crimes spanning two decades, it was the first reported use of geographical profiling in criminal investigation to track familiar locations and areas of the rapist, which Canadian profiler Kim Rossmo was employed for. That, along with an anonymous tip and DNA from a discarded cigarette butt, led to Comeaux. Comeaux confessed to the rapes and pleaded guilty to six rape charges, now currently serving a life sentence from each rape conviction. Forensic Files documented the investigation in the episode "Badge of Deceit".
Warren Jeffs	United States	1980s–2006	Unknown	Cult leader and convicted child sex abuser who runs the Fundamentalist Church of Jesus Christ of Latter-Day Saints.
Mark Dixie	United Kingdom; Australia; Spain	1980s–2006	4–6	Best known for the rape and murder of Sally Anne Bowman in 2005, Dixie was also convicted in 2017 of two separate rapes committed in the UK in 1987 and 2002. After his arrest for the Sally Anne Bowman murder he was positively linked by DNA to a rape of a woman in her house Australia in June 1998 and to a rape of a woman in Spain in 2003. An innocent man was convicted of the latter but was eventually freed in 2016 after a long bureaucratic process and after Dixie formally confessed to the rape. Spanish prosecutors are certain that Dixie also committed two other rapes in the same place within two hours of this attack, and Dixie said he may have committed them but could not remember as he was supposedly high on drugs at the time.
Telford child sex abuse ring	United Kingdom	1980s–2009	1,000+	British-Pakistani gang who sexually abused teenage girls in Telford. Seven men were convicted, although many more were implicated. An inquiry into institutional failings revealed that over 1,000 girls were thought to have been victimized by the gang, and that the abuse had started in the 1980s and continued for several generations before it was finally exposed.
Harvey Weinstein	United States	1980s–2010s	20	Former film producer who exploited his influential position to commit numerous sexual assaults. Accused by twenty women of rape; was arrested in May 2018 and convicted of two charges in February 2020 including one count of rape in the third degree. He was convicted on three further rape charges in December 2022. Extradited to additional jurisdictions to await around a dozen current additional sexual assault charges.
Aijaz Sheikh	India	1980s–2014	5,000	As an Imam, he used his power to abuse thousands of children. A single victim of Sheikh's stated that he was subjected to over 500 rapes in a three year period.
Mark Profit	United States	1981–1996	4+	The prime suspect in the "Theodore Wirth Park Killer" case. Raped three women and girls before the murders began. Was convicted of one murder and raping a fourth woman, always professing his innocence. Died by drug overdose in a presumed suicide in 2001.
Wang Wanming	China	1981–1998	54	Committed two rapes in his native Liaoning in 1981 and in the mid-1980s, for which he was imprisoned for a combined total of 24 years. He later escaped from a prison hospital and moved to Shaanxi, where he subsequently raped a further 52 women from 1992 to 1998, killing 20. Wang was later arrested, convicted and executed in 1999.
Altemio Sanchez	United States	1981–2006	9	Known as the "Bike Path Rapist/Killer"; Puerto Rican man who raped between 9 and 15 women in Buffalo, New York, killing at least three of them; another man was wrongfully convicted for his crimes; sentenced to 75 years to life.
Erich Hauert	Switzerland	1982–1983	11	Sex offender who committed 11 rapes and three murders from 1982 to 1983; sentenced to life imprisonment; his case impacted treatment of dangerous sexual offenders in Switzerland tremendously.
Richard Allen Minsky	United States	1982–1999	100+	Known as "The Con Artist Rapist". Recidivist con artist, extortionist, and serial rapist of woman for nearly two decades across a dozen states. Minsky would randomly trick women in the phone book by distressing them with ruses of their loved ones, then lure them to extort them or rape and brutalize them. Minsky would be in and out of prison for the few sporadic crimes he would be caught for, before eventually being arrested as a fugitive and connected with hundreds of women being targeted, conned, and attacked nationwide. LAPD Detective John Metcalf, who was assigned to track Minsky when he started on the job, put in all his efforts even down to appealing to the public to track Minsky down. When Minsky was arrested, his motive for the crimes was reportedly refusing to put in paying work for a living as a parolee. The sentencing judge remarked it being wonderful criminals in the world like Minsky were a rarity. Was sentenced to life in prison and remains incarcerated.
Phillip Pizzo	United States	1983–1984	7	Known as "The Mall Rapist"; kidnapped young girls from malls in Natick and Peabody, Massachusetts, taking them to his home in Westford, where he would repeatedly abuse and sodomize them; confessed to 20 rapes in total; sentenced to 11 terms of life imprisonment with a chance of parole.
Danny Bible	United States	1983–1998	10+	Known as "The Ice Pick Killer"; sexually abused and raped adult women and young girls across Montana, Texas and Louisiana, most of whom were his relatives; additionally responsible for a 1979 rape-murder in Houston and a 1983 triple murder in Weatherford, Texas. Convicted for the 1979 murder and executed in 2018.
Patrick Trémeau	France	1983–2005	19	Known as the "Parking Rapist"; active in Paris, he would follow young women to buildings with underground car parks, where he would subsequently threaten them with a knife and rape them. His case influenced the debate on recidivism in France, and currently, he is serving a 20-year sentence.
Malcolm Fairley	United Kingdom	1984	4+	Known as "The Fox", which comes from Fairley's habit of squatting in victims' homes and helping himself to their groceries and other utilities. Petty criminal and domestic abuser before escalating to a series of break-in physical assaults, sexual assaults on women and at least one man, and rapes of women, often fashioning masks and gloves out of cloth and even fabrics from the homes he burglarized tying up the homes' occupants during the assaults or while squatting. Reportedly confessed to feeling more empowered when using a shotgun, but was fought back against in several attacks and fled when failing to dominate people in the home. Was a highly disorganized criminal, from burying a shotgun without remembering where it was left to scraping paint off his car in a frantic escape that was left on bushes. The paint forensics and Fairley's confirmed left-handedness led to his arrest. Was convicted and imprisoned on six life sentences.
Oleg Kosarev	Soviet Union; Russia	1984–2011	40	Known as the "Elevator"; robber and pedophilic rapist who assaulted teenage girls in elevators around several cities in Moscow Oblast; claims to have committed at least 140 rapes; sentenced to 20 years' imprisonment.
Marc Dutroux	Belgium	1985–1996	9+	Considered Belgium's worst repeat felony offender. Originally arrested for five kidnappings and rapes with accomplices. Also confessed to domestic physical abuse. Was paroled despite objections citing Dutroux as still dangerous, Kidnapped and raped four more girls, two who were buried alive and two who died of starvation and dehydration when Dutroux was arrested for auto theft and his accomplices did not nourish the girls. Was arrested after kidnapping and raping two more girls, as well as found to have abundant violent child pornography and four different properties used as locations for the crimes, two with buried remains of the murdered girls and an accomplice Dutroux had slaughtered. With Dutroux finances, properties, child pornography which was allegedly made to be internationally disseminated, Dutroux's early release against confirmed professional testimony of Dutroux's culpability and imposed dangers, and the fiascos in arresting Dutroux and saving the girls, including the girls who starved to death after police were in the house they were captive in, Belgian citizens were outraged, and there were allegations and investigations over infiltration of criminal conspiracies and syndicates corrupting the governing, legal, and judicial systems and exploiting Belgium in the interest of organized crime with elite and systemic ties. Trust between citizens and law enforcement was destroyed, resulting in the famous White March protests by victims, their loved ones, and crowds of citizens in support, as well as massive reformation of the systems. Despite Dutroux and accomplices being convicted and sentenced to hard prison time, one accomplice, businessman Michel Nihoul, was acquitted on major charges in the case, despite being imprisoned after other criminal conspiracies, and dozens of deaths and disappearances of witnesses and other affiliated people in the case have been deemed suspicious and possibly involved in presumed conspiracies. Investigations and testimonies throughout the country to collect evidence and bring cases to court and accused parties to justice are far from complete. Dutroux requested parole in a letter sent to the courts in 2021, which sent the public up in arms and would later be denied.
Benny Sela	Israel	1985–1999	24	According to police, Sela committed at least 24 and possibly as many as 34 rapes, sexual assaults, and sexual molestations of women and girls in central Israel over the course of five years in the 1990s, though it is suspected that he committed his first rape as a teenager in 1985. In 1995, he was arrested and sentenced to two years in prison for having systematically molested his cousin from the time she was eight to when she was fifteen and resumed his rape spree upon his release. After being arrested for an attempted rape in 1999, he was identified as a serial rapist. He pleaded guilty as part of a plea bargain and was sentenced to 35 years in prison.
Keith Simms	Australia	1985–2001	31	Known as the "Centennial Park rapist", the "Bondi rapist", the "tracksuit rapist" and lastly the "Bondi Beast". Identity uncovered only in 2022, a few months after his death, by DNA match. Most of his victims were abducted while jogging, while some others were assaulted after he broke into their home at night. Victims were threatened with a knife.
Bala Kuppusamy	Singapore	1985–2008	7+	From 1985 to 2008, Bala Kuppusamy went to prison thrice for three separate crime sprees, which involved the robbery and rape of several females (both adults and minors alike). In 1987, Bala was jailed for 11 years and given 24 strokes of the cane on a charge of raping a 19-year-old girl. In 1993, after his release, Bala attacked four women in separate incidents and sexually assaulted two of the victims, and received a sentence of 23 years in jail with 24 strokes of the cane. In 2008, after his release, Bala re-offended again by robbing seven women and even raped four of these victims. As a result, he was given 42 years' jail and 24 strokes of the cane.
The 'Beast of Buckland'	United Kingdom	1986–1987	3+	The 'Beast of Buckland' is the name given to an unidentified attacker who appeared to primarily target victims in Buckland, Portsmouth. A 5-year-old girl raped in June 1987 was believed to be a victim of the man, and he committed other sex attacks in the area. He was also said to be the perpetrator of the murder of Linda Cook which occurred nearby in 1986, for which there is now DNA evidence (which demonstrated that a man previously convicted had been wrongly imprisoned).
Mustapha Tabet	Morocco	1986–1992	518-1600+	Corrupt police commissioner who kidnapped and raped young girls and women at his apartment in Casablanca, always recording his assaults on tape. His case was infamous for the fact that he used his power and influence to destroy evidence of his wrongdoings. Tabet was convicted, sentenced to death and executed for his crimes in 1993, the last person to be executed in Moroccan history.
Paul Bernardo	Canada	1986–1992	14–24	Known as "The Scarborough Rapist" and "The Schoolgirl Killer". Originally a serial rapist of numerous women and girls, with propensities of sexual sadism and an obsession with targeting women and girls who still retained their virginity. As "The Scarborough Rapist", Bernardo stalked women and girls on the streets and anally raped them at knifepoint and was even interviewed due to fitting a composite sketch, volunteering a DNA sample that would not be tested for two years. Bernardo married Karla Homolka, battering and degrading her throughout the marriage. Escalating further, Bernardo committed "The Schoolgirl Murders" by kidnapping, raping, torturing, and murdering teenage girls with Homolka as an accomplice. The crimes were recorded on camera, and Homolka was ordered by Bernardo to steal drugs to incapacitate the girls, as well as carry out tortures and rapes on four of the girls, including Homolka's sister Tammy who choked to death after being given an overdose of the substance. Bernardo strangled two other girls to death, and another girl was raped twice by the duo and released, with little to no recollection until after the second rape. Homolka reported Bernardo and filed charges for a severe beating. The DNA test was finally conducted from Bernardo's rape spree, and Homolka's confessed to her participation in the remaining crimes and Bernardo's involvement in other rapes that were not previously connected. Both were convicted and imprisoned, considered the most dangerous criminals in Canada's history. The duo were collectively nicknamed "The Ken and Barbie Killers" due to their higher-class statuses. Bernardo confessed in 2006 to raping ten other women and girls a year before the Scarborough rape spree, and was denied parole in 2021. Karla was eventually released long after divorcing Bernardo, with all her restrictions lifted by court order, marrying a relative of her legal representative and starting a family.
João Teixeira de Faria	Brazil	1986–2017	9+	Also known as João de Deus (John of God), In 2018, after over 600 accusations of sexual abuse, Faria turned himself in to police. In December 2019, he was sentenced to 19 years and four months for the rapes of four women. On 20 January 2020, 40 years were added to his prison time for the rape of five additional women. The sentences add up to 63 years and four months.
Tony Alexander King (a.k.a. Tony Bromwich)	United Kingdom	1986, 1997	8	King is infamous for being convicted of murdering Rocío Wanninkhof and Sonia Carabantes in southern Spain in 1999 and 2003 respectively. An innocent woman was originally convicted of the former murder. King had fled to Spain from his native England because he had featured on Crimewatch in September 1997 for an attempted rape of a woman in Leatherhead. He had previously been convicted of sexually assaulting seven women across north London in 1986 and was caught attempting to attack another woman, becoming known then as the "Holloway Strangler". He was never able to fully penetrate the victims because he was impotent.
Mr. Cruel	Australia	1987–1990	3	Serial pedophile rapist who attacked three girls in the northern and eastern suburbs of Melbourne, Victoria in the late 1980s and early 1990s and is the prime suspect in the abduction and murder of a fourth girl.
Kelvin Lim Hock Hin	Singapore	1987–1996	10	A pedophilic sex offender who committed various sexual offences against young boys between 1987 and 1996. In 1988, Lim was jailed for 15 months for raping four young boys. Lim was given 32 months' jail in 1993 for four counts of sexually abusing a nine-year-old boy. Between 1995 and 1996, after his release, Lim targeted five boys aged between nine and 13 and sexually abused them. Lim was sentenced to a total of 40 years' imprisonment after his pedophilic disorder was assessed to be chronic and carried a high propensity to re-offend.
Roland Cazaux	France	1987–2002	36	Known as "The Cat"; raped women in Arcachon and Landes, sneakily entering through open windows at night and managing to avoid detection. Sentenced to 14 years' imprisonment, but paroled in 2012.
Harold Wayne Nichols	United States	1988–1989	12+	Known as the "Red-Haired Stranger"; raped several women in and around Chattanooga, Tennessee, killing one of his victims in September 1988. Sentenced to death for murder in May 1990 and executed by lethal injection on December 11, 2025.
Dennis Rabbitt	United States	1988–1997	14	Known as "The South Side Rapist"; burgled various homes in St. Louis and surrounding counties, where he raped female victims ranging from young girls to elderly women. Although convicted of only 14 rapes, Rabbitt is suspected in more than 100+ rapes across Missouri and Illinois, starting in 1973.
Robert Lee Walden	United States	1989–1991	4	Stalked women around apartment complexes in Tucson, Arizona from 1989 to 1991, later breaking into their apartment and raping them under the threat of a knife. During the rapes, surviving victims noted that Walden frequently taunted them, and always pretended to leave several times before finally fleeing. He was convicted of two murders and four rapes, for which he was given a death sentence and five life terms, respectively. He has also confessed to a third murder, for which he has never been charged.
Jon Schillaci	United States; Mexico	1989–2007	3+	Serial sexual abuser of boys, starting in 1989 with an accomplice, luring the boys with meals and movies for sexually exploiting them and videotaping the sexual assaults. Was arrested and convicted, sentenced in 1990 to ten years in prison, when trying to sell the tape. Schillaci graduated from prison, studied several languages, and wrote poetry for a literary magazine, which was used to write to a family and manipulate them with his alleged "rehabilitation". Was released in 1999 and moved in with the family, only to have been revealed to have sexually exploited the family's young son during piano lessons and shown him child pornography. Schillaci fled to Mexico with incrimination evidence left behind, moving between several different cities in the country under numerous aliases and raping and molesting countless boys in each city. Schillaci even lived with another sex offender, Gregory Alan Phillips, a witness to Schillaci's crimes in Mexico. Gained a following in pedophile cultures, hosted an Internet radio show, and partook in online "boylovers" chat forums and a scrapped NBC news interview under an alias as a pedophile activism spokesperson. Vigilante groups tracked Schillaci's activities in 2007, and he was arrested and extradited in 2008. Pleaded guilty to charges to avoid a guaranteed life without parole sentence in prison.
Michael Oluronbi	United Kingdom	1989–2009	15	Church pastor who raped children after "holy baths" he claimed would ward off evil, as part of the Birmingham bathing cult. Targeted his victims over 20 years and told them they would fail exams or become a witch if they did not comply. Convicted in 2020, his wife was also jailed for her part in the rapes, and for arranging abortions for the victims who had been impregnated by Oluronbi.
Joël Le Scouarnec	France	1989–2014	299	A French surgeon who had 299 registered victims, mostly of girls under 15 years of age and mostly his patients at the hospitals he worked at. He was put under trial in 2025, and his case became the largest child sexual abuse trial in France.
Yevgeny Litovchenko	Russia	1990s–2014	4–11+	Ukrainian child rapist active in Leningrad Oblast. Sentenced to 12 years imprisonment for three rapes committed in the 1990s, later paroled and committed one confirmed rape, but also suspected in at least four murders and several other rapes. Litovchenko escaped custody during an investigative experiment and fled to Ukraine, where he raped and murdered a young woman there. He was convicted in that case and sentenced to life imprisonment, with Ukrainian authorities refusing to extradite him back to Russia due to diplomatic breakdown between the two countries.
Quisi Bryan	United States	1990s-2000	5+	American cop killer who fatally shot a police officer during a traffic stop, and was sentenced to death in 2000 by the state of Ohio for the murder. On death row, Bryan was implicated in the unrelated kidnappings and rapes of at least five women that occurred in the 1990s by DNA testing, and he received an additional 72 years in prison for those offenses.
Alex Kelly	United States	1990	7	Known as "The Preppy Rapist". Was arrested for the kidnappings and rapes of two teenagers while in school. Afterwards, five more women and girls came forward and accused Kelly of rape as well. Kelly fled prosecution and hid in Europe for years, maintaining contact with his parents, who are alleged to have helped him stay out of jurisdiction. Kelly was extradited, convicted, and imprisoned to serve his sentence for two counts of aggravated kidnapping and rape. Kelly was paroled and was last reported to have been working as an instructor in skydiving.
Karla Homolka	Canada	1990–1992	4	Abused ex-wife of serial rapist and killer Paul Bernardo. Bernardo was previously a serial rapist and married Karla, who was battered and degraded by Bernardo from to proclivities of dominance and misogyny. Bernardo recruited Karla into a new spree of sexually motivated crimes named "The Schoolgirl Murders", where teenage girls were kidnapped by the duo because Bernardo wanted to target virgin women, raped and tortured on film by Bernardo and Karla at Bernardo's instruction, and three were murdered. The crimes started with Karla's sister Tammy Homolka, who overdosed on drugs Karla stole and sedated her with. A second teenage girl was raped and tortured twice while on drugs and did not recollect the crimes. Two more teenage girls were raped and tortured to death, buried in the Homolka house basement each time there was a family dinner, then their remains buried in cement. Karla charged Bernardo with a brutal assault, leading to his arrest around the same time his DNA was tested regarding the previous series of rapes Bernardo committed. Karla confessed to the remaining crimes and her involvement, taking guilty pleas of prison time in exchange for her testimony. Bernardo and Karla were considered the worst and most hated criminals in the history of Canada, the press spitefully nicknaming Karla "The Witch of Ontario". Karla soon after filed for divorce, but she lost her chance at parole due to her sexual relations with a convicted murderer. She eventually was released with tight restrictions, which were overturned by the courts over a couple of years. Karla spoke publicly from her own narrative, married a relative of her legal representative, and had children with him. She has continuously staved off public outrage and unwarranted reckless publicity and is now living separate from her more recent family.
Ajmer rape gang	India	1990–1992	250	Gang led by Farooq and Nafees Chishti who lured young women to isolated buildings and gang-raped them, photographing the act in order to blackmail the victims into remaining silent. Investigations beginning in 1992 identified around 250 victims aged between 11 and 20, although most victims opted not to proceed with charges. 18 men were prosecuted over the case.
Jean-Luc Blanche	France	1990–2003	9	Known as the "Backpacker Rapist"; active in several departments around France, Blanche would often kidnap and drive his victims to isolated areas, where he would repeatedly rape them. After he was finished, he acted nicely towards the victims, even driving them back to their homes. His case, which was highly publicized, contributed to the creation of the automated judicial file for sex offenders in the country.
Sergey Yarovoy	Kazakhstan	1990–2008	4	Known as "The Bloody Paramedic"; raped a woman in Boralday and imprisoned for 3 years. Upon release, he raped and murdered another woman and was sentenced to 15 years imprisonment, but was released yet again around 2004. Two years later, he started a crime spree in Ust-Kamenogorsk and Opytnoye Pole, attacking nine victims – six were murdered and three others were spared. Sentenced to life imprisonment.
Delroy Grant	United Kingdom	1990–2009	34	Convicted rapist who carried out a series of offences of burglary, rape and sexual assault dating between October 1992 and May 2009 in the South East London area of England, targeting primarily elderly women. He is positively linked to four reported rapes and around 30 other sexual assaults. Police believe he is also responsible for at least another two rapes where the victims felt unable to make any official allegation. The true total may be higher as his victims are often too traumatised to speak to police.
Byrd Dickens	Canada	1990–2016	6+	Canadian former actor on the Degrassi franchise and convicted pedophile, including sexually assaulting a girl with her mother's go-ahead and recorded acts of child sexual assault on discovered files of child pornography. Was previously accused, yet acquitted, of raping three women shortly after the conclusion of his role. Crimes happened in Ontario in areas of Toronto, Brampton, and London, Ontario.
The Creeper	Sweden; Norway	1990s–2003	8	Broke into the houses of female victims around Gothenburg, watching over them before eventually raping them under the threat of a knife. The perpetrator, whose name was not released, was later identified via DNA evidence as a man serving a rape sentence in neighboring Norway. Sentenced to forensic psychiatric care.
Colin Batley	United Kingdom	1990s–2010	11	Leader of the Kidwelly sex cult, which was uncovered by police in 2010. He was convicted of 11 counts of rape against children and other sexual offences, while his wife, two other women, and a second man were also convicted of sexual offences.
Jeffrey Epstein	United States	1990s–2019	350+	Financier with ties to many high-profile people who, along with Ghislaine Maxwell, built an international sex trafficking ring in which over 1,000 girls and young women were sexually abused. He was convicted in 2008 of procuring a child for prostitution and sex trafficking and sentenced to 13 months in prison. He was arrested again in 2019 on sex trafficking charges before his death in custody on August 10, 2019.
Demetrius Terrence Frazier	United States	1991–1992	8	Frazier had committed a total of eight rapes in Michigan, in addition to the 1991 rape-murder of Pauline Brown in Alabama and 1992 murder of Crystal Kendrick in Michigan. Frazier was found guilty by a Michigan court for murdering Kendrick and two of the rape cases and a robbery case, and sentenced to four life sentences plus 60 to 90 years in total. Frazier was also sentenced to death in Alabama for the killing of Brown. Frazier was eventually executed in Alabama on February 6, 2025.
Scott Lehr	United States	1991–1992	17	Dubbed the Baby Seat Rapist, Scott Lehr is a serial rapist and serial killer who raped at least 20 women, three of which died due to fatal assault wounds, between 1991 and 1992. Lehr was sentenced to death for the three murders, while receiving multiple life sentences for the other rape cases.
Potomac River Rapist	United States	1991–1997	9	The Potomac River Rapist is a serial rapist and murderer who was active in the Washington, D.C. metropolitan area from 1991 to 1998. Ten sexual assaults and one murder were linked to the suspect by DNA. Fatal rape attack on August 1, 1998, not included. A suspect was arrested and charged on November 13, 2019, then died reportedly by suicide on November 19, 2022.
Batman rapist	United Kingdom	1991–2000	17	The Batman rapist is an English unidentified serial sex offender who has committed at least 17 attacks on women in the city of Bath, Somerset. He was nicknamed after leaving a baseball cap bearing a logo from the Batman film series at the scene of one attack. Remains a suspect in the murder of Melanie Hall ever since she disappeared years before a portion of her skeleton was found and identified.
Akku Yadav	India	1991–2004	40	Rapist and murderer in India who was lynched by a mob of around 200 women. Yadav was stabbed over seventy times, and chili powder and stones were thrown in his face. One of his alleged victims also hacked off his penis.
Marcelo Sajen	Argentina	1991–2004	93	Car thief who raped young women in the City of Cordoba, Argentina. He committed suicide with a shot to the head to avoid arrest. Before and after his death, DNA tests linked him to 93 cases of rape, but his actual number of victims is believed to be 200.
Roy Charles Waller	United States	1991–2006	12	American man who was arrested in September 2018 as a suspect in a series of more than ten rapes and kidnappings committed between 1991 and 2006 in six Northern California counties (the "Norcal Rapist"). DNA evidence from crime scenes were matched on GEDmatch to a relative of Waller, and he was identified through genetic genealogy.
Aaron H. Thomas	United States	1991–2009	22	Rapist Aaron H. Thomas was arrested on March 4, 2011, after police matched his DNA to that of the rapist from a cigarette butt he discarded. On March 5, 2011, jailers reported that Thomas attempted to hang himself while in a jail cell.
Julie Wadsworth	United Kingdom	1992–1996	6	British radio presenter who forced six underage boys to have sex with her in the 1990s with help from her husband Tony, who acted as a lookout. The couple were both jailed for historic sexual offences in 2017.
Joji Obara	Japan	1992–2000	150–400	Korean–Japanese businessman who drugged and raped between 150 and 400 women, at least two of which died. Obara was tried for one of the deaths, and was sentenced to life imprisonment. Obara has been described as the worst serial rapist in the country's history, and his case received international coverage due to most of his victims being foreign tourists.
Martin Ney	Germany France (possible)	1992–2004	40	He wore a mask while killing three and sexually assaulting at least 40 children in school camps. He also raped victims in private homes and other places. Also known as the "Masked Man" and the "Black Man."
Ariel Castro	United States	1992–2013	3	Known as "The Monster of Cleveland". Puerto Rico-born serial kidnapper and rapist of three girls who knew Castro's children starting in 2002. Held them all captive and retrained them in a house not far from the places they were snatched, being repeatedly raped and brutalized for over a decade into their early adult years. Two girls were pregnant, one girl giving birth to a daughter, the other girl having miscarriages and left with damage to her sight and hearing from the violence of the assaults and other torture. One woman escaped with her daughter conceived from rape and went to the police. The two other women were rescued and Castro was arrested, everyone who was held captive being given medical treatment at the hospital and reunited with their families. Castro committed suicide by hanging while in prison custody. Castro is also guilty of holding his wife against her will and viciously beating her starting in 1992, which led her to develop an inoperable brain tumor from the violence that killed her in 2012. John Kasich, then-governor of Ohio, publicly met and commended the girls, the house where the captivity primarily happened was demolished with one woman in attendance with a crowd of supporters, and another woman later reunited with one of the neighbors who rescued her and her daughter.
Igor Irtyshov	Russia	1993–1994	7	Pedophile who raped young boys in St. Petersburg, killing two of them; sentenced to death, commuted to life imprisonment.
Larry James Harper	United States	1993–1994	3	El Paso resident sentenced to decades in prison for raping three women in their homes over a six-month period. Escaped from prison in December 2000 alongside six other inmates. Was eventually cornered by law enforcement in a motor home, where he committed suicide rather than be captured.
Larry Nassar	United States	c. 1994–2016	500+	Team doctor of the United States women's national gymnastics team, where he used his position to exploit and sexually assault hundreds of young athletes as part of the largest sexual abuse scandal in sports history.
Uni-Phantom	Germany	1994–2002	21	Unidentified sex offender responsible for 21 rapes of predominantly young women, first starting in Sprockhövel before moving into the vicinity of the Ruhr University Bochum. The Phantom usually threatened his victims with a knife at public transport stops before raping them. For unknown reasons, there were large gaps between his rape series, and the investigation into his crimes in still ongoing.
Earl Bradley	United States	1994–2009	103+	Disgraced former pediatric physician in the Northeastern United States, surrendered in 2009 to a trail where he was later convicted of dozens of sex crimes, often on videotape, against children in the office where we worked. Also physically and emotionally battered his son and stole psychiatric drugs from his employers. Regarded as one of America's worst child sexual predators. Although conviction on confirmed charges regarding sexually assaulting and exploiting over a hundred children, some as young as infants, hundreds more victims and their families have filed civil suits.
Jerry Sandusky	United States	1994–2009	52	Penn State football coach and founder of The Second Mile charity for at risk children. Was investigated, arrested, and convicted on charges of dozens of rapes and molestations of boys spanning decades, including his adopted son Matt. His adopted son Jeffrey was arrested and sentenced on charges of child sex offense and possession of child pornography. Deceased coach Joe Paterno was alleged to have been informed of the crimes and disregarded the reports. School president Graham Spanier, vice president Gary Schultz, and athletic director Tim Curley were all convicted on misdemeanor child endangerment charges, but not on conspiracy charges. The three were sentenced to jail, fines, and probation.
Kirk Reid	United Kingdom	1995–2007	28	Raped and sexually assaulted women in South London, most frequently in the districts of Wandsworth, Balham and Tooting; suspected of over 70 assaults, beginning in 1984; sentenced to life imprisonment.
Marcel Hansen	Denmark	1995–2010	6	Known as the "Amager Man"; football coach who raped six women between around Amager, in addition to murdering another two on separate occasions in 1987 and 1990; was also indicted for a seventh rape, but was acquitted due to lack of evidence; sentenced to life imprisonment.
John Williams Jr.	United States	1996	5	Homeless drifter who raped five women in the Raleigh, North Carolina area between January and December 1996, killing two of them; sentenced to death.
Mamadou Traoré	France	1996	5	Senegalese-born man who assaulted at least six female victims in Paris, raping five and killing two of them. At trial, he claimed to have been cursed by evil Vodun spirits, which caused him to kill. Sentenced to life imprisonment.
Vince Champ	United States	1996–1997	8	American stand-up comedian who raped at least eight women. He had a consistent method of operation in each of the rapes, he covered their heads so they could not identify him, he asked about their sexual history, engaged in anal sex, used his own saliva for lubrication, and he asked each of the women to pray for him afterward.
Cedric Maake	South Africa	1996–1997	14	Attacked couples parked in cars around the Wemmer Pan area whom Maake would assault, shooting the men and raping the women.
Andrei Roldugin	Russia	1996–2002	9	Known as "The Voronezh Maniac"; abducted and raped teenagers and young women in Voronezh, before resorting to raping and killing his final ones. The three murder victims, all teenagers, were raped, strangled and their bodies sexually abused post-mortem. After his capture, Roldugin confessed to all the crimes and was sentenced to life imprisonment for them.
Teardrop rapist	United States	1996–2012	35	The "teardrop rapist" is a moniker for an unidentified rapist responsible for 35 sexual assaults on women, including minors, in Los Angeles, California.
Tomasz Włodarek	Poland	1997–2000	6	Known as the "Vampire of Świnoujście"; raped young girls and women under the threat of a knife in the Świnoujście area, killing one woman and a female customs officer; sentenced to two counts of life imprisonment.
Troy Graves	United States	1997–2001	9	Known as "The Center City Rapist"; burgled homes in Philadelphia, Pennsylvania and Fort Collins, Colorado, raping the female occupants; killed a doctoral student in 1998; sentenced to life imprisonment.
Mark Wayne Rathbun	United States	1997–2002	16	Known as "The Belmont Shore Rapist". Between 1997 and 2002, Rathbun committed at least sixteen break-in rapes of women in Los Angeles County and Orange County, California. Many of Rathbun's attacks were committed in the Belmont Shore district of Long Beach, California, hence his nickname. In addition to striking in Long Beach, Rathbun was also active in the cities of Huntington Beach and Los Alamitos. Was convicted in August 2004 and October 2008 on dozens of charges regarding the rape spree.
Carl Leone	Canada	1997–2004	4–6+	Canadian businessman convicted of numerous counts of aggravated sexual assault, on the grounds of deliberately infecting sexual partners with HIV. Was also guilty of drugging, kidnapping, and raping teenage and virgin girls and women after luring them to nightclubs from online chatting and messaging forums.
Rochdale child sex abuse ring	United Kingdom	1997–2013	24	28 members of a grooming ring have been convicted as of 2022 for the systematic rape and sexual abuse of young girls, many younger than 16, in Rochdale between 2004 and 2013, although "thousands" of men are said to have been involved in the crimes and they are believed to have started in around 1997. The men have between them been convicted of 24 counts of rape, but were also convicted of multiple other counts of attempts to rape, conspiracy to rape and for other sexual crimes. The ring gained notoriety in the UK as the men were mostly British Pakistani men, which led to inflamed racial tensions.
Basharat Dad	United Kingdom	Late 1990s–early 2000s	6	Convicted in 2017 of six counts of rape of a child committed as part of the Rotherham child sexual exploitation gang.
Li Feng	China	1998–2002	19	Chinese teacher who was executed for sexually molesting and raping 19 girls. Li was an elementary school teacher in the city of Tonghua, in northeast China's Jilin province. He began teaching in 1998, and he began molesting his students in August of that year. He assaulted various girls in his class for the next four years. The victims were all under the age of 14.
John Jamelske	United States	1998–2003	5	Serial kidnapper and rapist of five different women of various ages and backgrounds in Fayetteville, New York. Jamelske, a reclusive hoarder that came into a lot of money, constructed a basement cell before regularly kidnapping a woman from the street, imprisoning her in the cell for months, and raping her repeatedly while directing and recording her activities. The woman would then be released, with Jamelske searching for another woman to abduct to repeat the cycle. After Jamelske was arrested, one woman who was held captive openly spoke out about her trauma and elaborated Jamelske's crimes on a radio show.
Niklas Lindgren	Sweden	1998–2005	9	Known as "Hagamannen"; convicted of sexual assaults in and around the area of Umeå, after one of Sweden's largest police investigations, which was marred with setbacks; sentenced to nine years and released on parole in 2015.
Assad Hussain	United Kingdom	1998–2005	5	Convicted of five counts of rape in 2018 committed as part of the Oxford child sex abuse ring.
Kameer Iqbal	United Kingdom	1998–2005	3	Convicted of three counts of rape in 2018 committed as part of the Oxford child sex abuse ring.
Ademir Oliveira Rosário	Brazil	1998–2007	23+	Known as "The Cantareira Maniac"; killed a man in 1991 and imprisoned at a mental institution, but was allowed probation on weekends. Using this, he sexually assaulted at least 23 teenage boys, with most of his victims being attacked at the Serra da Cantareira mountain range. Caught after killing two brothers in September 2007, for which he was sentenced to 57 years imprisonment.
Keith Raniere	United States	1998–2018	156	Leader of the NXIVM sex cult under the guise of multi-level marketing. Formed a division within the cult exclusively designated for women, with Raniere running the group at the chief position, where hundreds of women were recruited, sexually abused, and trafficked regularly, as well as branded with Raniere's initials. Also accused of statutory sexual abuse of underage girls and repeated rape outside of the group. Arrested along with several of his associates and sentenced to life in prison on convictions including sex trafficking, conspiracy to commit forced labor, and racketeering.
Kamar Jamil	United Kingdom	1998–2012	5	Convicted of five counts of rape in 2013 committed as part of the Oxford child sex abuse ring.
Akhtar Dogar	United Kingdom	1998–2012	5	Convicted of five counts of rape in 2013 committed as part of the Oxford child sex abuse ring.
Anjum Dogar	United Kingdom	1998–2012	3	Convicted of three counts of rape in 2013 committed as part of the Oxford child sex abuse ring.
Mohammed Karrar	United Kingdom	1998–2012	7	Convicted in 2013 of four counts of rape of a child and three counts of rape committed as part of the Oxford child sex abuse ring.
Bassam Karrar	United Kingdom	1998–2012	3	Convicted in 2013 of two counts of rape of a child and one count of rape committed as part of the Oxford child sex abuse ring.
Naim Khan	United Kingdom	1999–2001	8	Convicted in 2020 of eight counts of rape committed as part of the Oxford child sex abuse ring.
Mohammed Nazir	United Kingdom	1999–2001	7	Convicted in 2020 of seven counts of rape committed as part of the Oxford child sex abuse ring.
Sageer Hussain	United Kingdom	1999–2003	4	Convicted in 2016 of four rapes committed as part of the Rotherham child sexual exploitation gang.
2019 South Wales paternal sex abuse case	United Kingdom	1999–2017	3	In 2019, an unnamed man was convicted of repeatedly, and incestuously, raping his daughters over 20 years, one of whom was also his granddaughter. He fathered at least six children with his own daughter and repeatedly raped one of the daughters they gave birth to. His trial judge said the number of times he had raped his daughters was "well into the hundreds". He has not been named to protect his victims.
Andrew Luster	United States	2000	4	Heir to cosmetics fortune and adoptive grandson of Max Factor, Sr. Was arrested for four counts of drug-induced aggravated rape when a college student accused Luster of drugging and raping her at his home and search revealed tapes of more unconscious rapes. Luster fled prosecution into Central America, but was convicted in absentia for the rapes and captured by bounty hunter Duane Chapman to be extradited back to the US. Luster is now serving life in prison for the rapes.
Steven Lorenzo and Scott Paul Schweickert	United States	2000—2003	7	Both Lorenzo and Schweickert had drugged and raped a total of nine homosexual men, two of whom later died. Lorenzo was sentenced to 200 years in federal prison for these rapes, plus the death penalty for state murder charges in Florida. Schweickert was handed a life sentence for state murder charges and 40 years in federal prison for similar drugs charges.
Abid Mohammed Saddique	United Kingdom	2000s–2010	4	Gang leader convicted of four counts of rape, two counts of sexual assault and three counts of sexual activity with a child for crimes committed as part of the Derby child sex abuse ring.
John Worboys	United Kingdom	2000–2008	10–100+	Known as the "Black Cab Rapist"; cab driver who drugged and subsequently raped across England. He was convicted of six attacks in 2009. Police have concluded that he amassed more than 100 victims; his case resulted in scrutiny towards the investigating team's incompetence. He was initially sentenced to life imprisonment. In 2019 he pleaded guilty to four more charges of administering drugs to women with the intention of sexually assaulting or raping them.
Lawrence Ray	United States	2000–2020	5–8+	Cult leader responsible for subjugating and exploiting college students at Sarah Lawrence College, including his daughter, whose dorm room he lived in and worked from. Was a notable contact of high-ranking figures, but also a con artist splitting his family up to obtain his children and a pathological liar, including reportedly during the trial of past acquaintance Bernard Kerik. Isolated his daughter, her friends, and other college students in the dorm room, brainwashed them, and forced them into strict regimens, forced labor, and even prostitution and sex trafficking. They would be manipulated with tall tales of civil service and were forced to drop their future life ambitions and even identities, reciprocate Ray's lies that they were targeting Ray by only his accusations (such as by poisoning with a variety of substances), privately remodel his properties, give him their paychecks, and balance his finances. Ray would exploit and punish the members by forcing them to brutalize themselves and each other, as well as be degraded by and engage in sexual intercourse with each other and with Ray. Ray was arrested during sexual acts with one student, as tabloids reported, months after New York magazine ousted Ray with a cover story exposé. The college students returned to their families and testified at the trial, throughout which Ray had critical medical episodes. Ray was found guilty on all counts and sentenced to life in prison.
Larry Murphy	Ireland	2001	8	Irishman convicted of kidnapping, repeatedly raping, and attempting to murder a young woman. Suspected in the disappearance of eight women.
Richard Goldberg	United States	2001	6	American retired aircraft engineer, working as an amateur babysitter to lure girls to his home staged for their arrival and sexually abuse them, all the while taking photos and storing them on his computer. Two sisters saw images of their friends being exploited by Goldberg, and after Goldberg's arrest, he jumped bail and fled to Canada. While Goldberg lived under an alias and false records, a counselor tipped off American authorities in 2007, leaving to Goldberg's arrest and extradition. Pleaded guilty to one count of producing child porn and was sentenced to twenty years in prison. Scheduled to be released in 2024.
Antoni Imiela	United Kingdom	2001–2002	9	A German-born convicted rapist, Antoni raped nine women and girls. The crimes took place in Surrey, Kent, Berkshire, London, Hertfordshire and Birmingham. He died in HMP Wakefield prison on 8 March 2018.
Roberto Martínez Vásquez	Chile	2001–2002	6	Known as the "Psychopath of La Dehesa"; Raised into poverty and spent his early years as a delinquent youth. Between 2001 and 2002, he would frequent high-class homes and rape the women. Was arrested in 2002 for an unrelated murder and committed suicide in his cell later that year.
Ricardo Cepates	United States	2001–2003	7	A Honduran immigrant, Cepates attacked seven girls and women in New Brunswick, New Jersey. He often attacked his victims in the late afternoon or early morning in the area surrounding Rutgers University, where some of his victims were attending as students.
Graham Capill	New Zealand	2001–2005	6+	Former leader of the Christian Heritage Party, convicted in 2005 of sexually assaulting girls under the age of 12. Pleaded guilty to most charges and was imprisoned, dissolving the political party. Paroled in 2011, moved to Christchurch in 2014.
Julio Kopseng	Norway	2001–2013	18	Colombian-born dancer and minor celebrity who drugged and raped women he invited over for job interviews in Oslo; sentenced to 21 years' imprisonment, the harshest penalty for a rape case in Norwegian history.
Gabriel Turgeman	Israel	2002–2004	5	Known as "The Evasive Pedophile"; abducted, beat and raped 5, possibly 10, young girls in Ashdod and Ashkelon; sentenced to 45 years imprisonment, the highest sentence imposed on a sex offender in the country.
Lassana Coulibaly	France	2002–2005	12	Known as the "Sock Rapist"; delinquent who kidnapped and raped women in several areas around France, always gagging his victim with a sock or other items, thus the nickname. Convicted and sentenced to 20 years' imprisonment.
Naoki Akamatsu	Japan	2003–2004	9	Japanese pop rock musician, convicted in 2005 of raping 9 women in Tokyo and sentenced to 14 years imprisonment. Convicted of a further sexual offence in 2021 following his release from prison.
Malka Leifer	Australia	2003–2007	2–9+	Headmistress of a Jewish girls' school in Australia who was accused of sexually abusing young students in her charge. An investigation revealed accusations against her by at least nine girls, and she was eventually convicted on 18 counts.
David Carrick	England	2003–2020	14	Metropolitan Police officer convicted on 22 charges of rape in 2022, 2023 and 2025 court cases.
Alan Robert Webster and Tanya French	United Kingdom	2004	5	Babysitters who raped a 12-week-old baby repeatedly in February and March 2004. 19-year-old Tanya French pleaded guilty to four counts of rape, while Webster pleaded guilty to one count. They recorded the abuse and were also convicted for this and a number of indecent assaults.
Trent Benson	United States	2004–2007	4+	Abducted, raped and beat women in Mesa and Phoenix from 2004 to 2007, resulting in the deaths of two victims. He was convicted and sentenced to death for the two murders and to 135 years imprisonment for two other sexual assaults, and is currently on death row. Police believe he might be responsible for further rapes and murders.
Unknown Portuguese holiday home serial rapist	Portugal	2004–2010	5–12	Serial rapist of young girls in British families in vacation homes in Portugal, the rapes of five girls definitively connected. Twelve in total have been identified as possibly connected altogether. The girls and other witnesses reported the same features, smells, speech, and even distinctive clothing of the rapist, with an M.O. of breaking into the holiday homes and sexually assaulting the girls in the beds they were sleeping in. The local police had suspected Euclides Monteiro, a person of interest in the disappearance of Madeleine McCann, but he was cleared by DNA evidence.
Amere Singh Dhaliwal	United Kingdom	2004–2011	22	Convicted in 2018 of 22 counts of rape committed as part of the Huddersfield grooming gang.
Zahid Hassan	United Kingdom	2004–2011	10	Convicted in 2018 of six counts of rape committed as part of the Huddersfield grooming gang. Convicted of a further four counts of rape and an attempted rape in 2021.
Wiqas Mahmud	United Kingdom	2004–2011	3	Convicted in 2018 of three counts of rape committed as part of the Huddersfield grooming gang.
Nasarat Hussain	United Kingdom	2004–2011	3	Convicted in 2018 of three counts of rape committed as part of the Huddersfield grooming gang.
Mohammed Azeem	United Kingdom	2004–2011	5	Convicted in 2018 of five counts of rape committed as part of the Huddersfield grooming gang.
Unnamed 32-year-old Huddersfield grooming gang member	United Kingdom	2004–2011	5	Convicted in 2019 of five counts of rape committed as part of the Huddersfield grooming gang.
Sunil Rastogi	India	2004–2017	60-500+	Indian paedophile who was arrested on 15 January 2017, on charges of raping numerous underaged girls. He has self-confessed to abusing over 500 and attempted to assault more than 2,500.
Mark Goudeau	United States	2005–2006	15	Known as "The Baseline Killer"; raped women and young girls in the North Central area of Phoenix, Arizona, during a crime spree in which he also kidnapped and killed other victims. Sentenced to death.
Leo Kuvayev	Russia	2005–2009	11	Russian-American spammer who molested at least eleven orphaned or mentally disabled girls in his Moscow office between 2005 and 2009. Among his illegal online activities, he was also convicted of distributing child pornography.
Niklas Eliasson	Sweden	2005–2010	14	Known as the "Örebro Rapist"; considered one of Sweden's worst serial rapists, Eliasson was active in Örebro, acting upon an inner voice that told his to attack women; sentenced to 12 years in prison, and released on parole in 2018.
Marie Black	United Kingdom	2005–2015	5	Notorious female ringleader of a Norwich child sex abuse ring. She was convicted on 23 counts of sexual offences against children, including rapes. The attacks were committed against five different victims, who were abused at parties and possibly offered to others in raffles. Black was imprisoned for a minimum of 24 years, while three other members of the gang received shorter sentences.
Andrei Kiyko	Russia	2006–2007	5+	Known as "The Sosnovsky Maniac"; robbed and raped young girls and women in Saint Petersburg's Sosnovsky Park, sometimes killing them. His confirmed rape victims were attacked from September 2006 to January 2007, but he is suspected of possibly having additional victims dating back to early 2004.
Basharat Kaliq	United Kingdom	2006–2011	5	Convicted of five counts of rape in 2019 for crimes committed as part of the Halifax child sex abuse ring.
Parvaze Ahmed	United Kingdom	2006–2011	3	Convicted of three counts of rape in 2019 for crimes committed as part of the Halifax child sex abuse ring.
Asif Hussain	United Kingdom	2006–2012	3	Convicted of three counts of rape in 2015 for crimes committed as part of the Aylesbury child sex abuse ring.
Mohammed Imran	United Kingdom	2006–2012	3	Convicted of three counts of rape in 2015 for crimes committed as part of the Aylesbury child sex abuse ring.
Vikram Singh	United Kingdom	2006–2012	4	Convicted of four counts of rape in 2015 for crimes committed as part of the Aylesbury child sex abuse ring.
Richard Huckle	Malaysia (convicted); Cambodia; Singapore; Laos; India (suspected)	2006–2014	71	British paedophile who assaulted underage children in Malaysia, possibly up to 200 across Southeast Asia, posing in appropriate jobs to lure his victims; described as one of Britain's worst, and youngest, paedophiles; given 22 life sentences, murdered in prison in England in 2019.
Terry Hornbuckle	United States	???–2006	3	Protestant former pastor in Arlington, Texas. Convicted and imprisoned in 2006 for the drug rapes of three women, two in his congregation; psychiatrically committed in 2010 once classified by the courts as a dangerous sex offender.
Erasmo Moena	Chile	2007–2010	6	Serial rapist convicted of 6 sexual assaults, along with 2 murders; given a 60-year prison sentence for the murders in 2011.
Azuar Ahamad	Singapore	2008–2009	23	Formerly jailed for molestation in 2003, Azuar Ahamad, who worked as a logistics executive, had drugged and raped 22 women (aged between 18 and 38), pretending to meet up with the victims at nightclubs, and introduce himself as a dental surgeon or businessman or student. Azuar would also add sedatives like Dormicum pills to the alcoholic drinks he bought for the victims before giving them to drink. After the victims gradually lose consciousness, Azuar would bring them to hotels or their homes, where he molested or raped them, and even stole from some of them and filmed himself each time he raped or molested the victims. Azuar was sentenced to a jail term of 37 years and six months and given 24 strokes of the cane for these crimes in 2014.
Henrique Sotero	Portugal	2008–2009	40	Known as the "Telheiras Rapist"; engineer who raped predominantly underage girls in the Greater Lisbon area at knifepoint; sentenced to 25 years' imprisonment.
Plymouth child sex abuse ring	United Kingdom	2008–2009	64	Gang consisting of four women and one man who molested infant children for child pornography at Little Teds Nursery in Plymouth. Police believe the crimes were part of a contest to see who could produce the most depraved image.
Juan Carlos Sánchez Latorre	Colombia; Venezuela (suspected)	2008–2011	267	Known as "The Big Bad Wolf"; lured young boys to hotels, where he raped and recorded videos of the assaults; suspected of more than 500, with some occurring in Venezuela; sentenced to 60 years' imprisonment.
Marc O'Leary	United States	2008–2012	6	Stalked and broke into the homes of six women with various ages, backgrounds, and other personal information in suburbs near Seattle and Denver, raping them while holding them captive for prolonged time in their own homes. The first woman identified, publicly named Marie, was never believed in her report and harassed by the despondent local officers assigned to her case into saying she lied, resulting in her being charged, convicted, and briefly imprisoned for her statement allegedly being "false". Combined efforts from departments in Washington and Colorado led to O'Leary, a previously nearby stationed army veteran, being identified and arrested in Colorado, with evidence of all rapes, including the rape of Marie, found in O'Leary's home. Revelations leading to Marie's exoneration and settlement by the city also led to changes in the Lynwood police department's protocol and ethics once its excessive rejections of sex offense cases was revealed. An article published in ProPublica detailed the case, An Unbelievable Story of Rape, as well as an adapted miniseries Unbelievable.
Ian Watkins	United Kingdom	2008–2017	6–9	Former front man of the rock band Lostprophets. Would manipulate mothers into letting Watkins sexually abuse their infant-age children. Watkins was convicted on three counts of child sexual assault, six counts of child pornography, and one count of extreme animal pornography, being sentenced to 29 years in prison. The two mothers were also convicted and sentenced to prison time. Watkins was transferred between prisons to be closer to his mother after her kidney transplant, but Watkins was transferred back to his original prison after starting to manipulate another mother. Investigations revealed reports of Watkins' offenses as far back as 2008. Watkins was stabbed to death in prison in late 2025.
Roger Abdelmassih	Brazil	2009	52	In early 2009 he was accused of sexually abusing sedated patients. Abdelmassih was sentenced to 278 years in prison for 52 rapes.
Yap Weng Wah	Singapore	2009–2012	45	A Malaysian quality assurance engineer who gained employment in Singapore. He was notorious for having raped 31 teenage boys aged between 11 and 14 in Singapore between 2009 and 2012, as well as committing 14 additional rapes of teenage males in Malaysia. Yap was arrested in Singapore in September 2012 and charged with 76 offences of sexual assault of minors, which included charges of oral sex and anal sex and filming of his illegal sexual acts. However, his charges were only applied for those committed in Singapore and he did not face charges of his sexual crimes committed in Malaysia due to lack of jurisdiction. Yap was found to be suffering from hebephilia, a sexual disorder which dictates a sexual interest in pubescent males. Three years later, in March 2015, in view of his high propensity to reoffend, the highly aggravating nature of his crimes and his lack of remorse, Yap Weng Wah, then 31 years old, was sentenced to serve a 30-year term of imprisonment and he also received 24 strokes of the cane, after he was convicted of 12 out of 76 charges (the remaining were taken into consideration during sentencing). Yap Weng Wah was known to be one of Singapore's worst sexual predators of young children in the city state's history.
Rabidin Satir	Malaysia	2009–2012	5+	A Malaysian serial rapist and suspected serial killer who killed five to six people and had committed several rapes and property offences. Between 2009 and 2012, Rabidin raped at least five females, four of whom were minors aged eight to 17, and the fifth was a pregnant woman whose husband he had murdered in 2012. Rabidin was sentenced to 50 years' imprisonment and 36 strokes of the cane for these sexual offences, but he was also sentenced to death for two of the murders he committed.
Michael Emerton	United Kingdom	2010s–2017	4	Leader of the Berkhamsted paedophile network, convicted in 2015 of four counts of rape and various other sexual offences. Given nine life sentences.
Matthew McKnight	Canada	2010–2016	5–13	Nightclub promoter accused of sexually assaulting several women while they were intoxicated. McKnight met the women at bars, plied them with alcohol, lured them to his home and assaulted them. He was charged with assaulting thirteen women, and was convicted on five counts in January 2020.
Levith Rúa	Colombia	2010–2019	12	Known as "The Beast from the Slaughterhouse"; former police officer who lured victims with false offers for jobs, then raped and tortured them at a hut in Malambo; also responsible for the murder of a student; sentenced to 37 years' imprisonment.
Emayartini	Indonesia	2011–2013	6	The first woman in Indonesian history to be convicted of rape. She was found guilty of raping six teenage boys over a three-year period and jailed for eight years.
Darren Sharper	United States	2011–2014	16	Darren Sharper was a former NFL football player who played in the league for 14 seasons with three different teams. During that time he was a 5x Pro Bowler 2x 1st Team All-Pro as well as a Super Bowl Champion and 2000's All decade Team member. In 2014, he pleaded guilty to the drugging and raping of 16 different women across four different states and was sentenced to 20 years in prison.
Peter Scully	Philippines	2011–2015	7+	Prolific Australian-born child sex offender with a long-standing history of sexually abusing children in the Philippines, mostly girls. Targeted children of impoverished families and even children of one of his girlfriends, tortured them, often with accomplices, produced "hurtcore" films of physical and sexual violence on children, and reportedly ran dark web child pornography sites and an international child sexual abuse ring. Convicted of five counts of rape against underage girls and sex trafficking.
Zdeno Mirga	United Kingdom	2012	8	Convicted of eight counts of rape in 2014 for crimes committed as part of the Peterborough sex abuse ring.
Hassan Abdulla	United Kingdom	2012	4	Convicted of four counts of rape in 2014 for crimes committed as part of the Peterborough sex abuse ring.
Renato Balog	United Kingdom	2012	5	Convicted of five counts of rape in 2014 for crimes committed as part of the Peterborough sex abuse ring.
Yasir Ali	United Kingdom	2012	4	Convicted of four counts of rape in 2014 for crimes committed as part of the Peterborough sex abuse ring.
Thabo Bester	South Africa	???–2012	3+	Known as "The Facebook Rapist." Used the site to lure, date rape, and rob numerous women, killing at least one of them. Escaped from prison after faking his death from a fire in his cell. Was arrested in Tanzania with two other people, including a reported romantic partner of Bester.
Jennifer Fichter	United States	2012–2014	3+	Former middle and high school English teacher. Arrested and convicted for sexual relations with three 17-year-old male high school students. Previously resigned in 2008 from the last school she worked at over discipline of similar misconduct and offenses.
Daniel Holtzclaw	United States	2013–2014	8	Used his authority as a police officer to target African American women in his community. Convicted of raping or assaulting eight women, but his true number of victims is believed to be eighteen.
Interstate 80 rapist	United States	2013–2014	3	Series of rapes that was committed by an unidentified serial rapist in Sacramento, California. While many have been convinced that other assaults took place by the same man, only three have been successfully linked by DNA. Investigative efforts and DNA evidence ruled out previous suspects, and the investigation remains cold.
Richard Choque	Bolivia	2013–2021	77+	Lured women through false ads on Facebook and posed as a police officer in order to extort them for money and sex. After being convicted and sentenced to 30 years imprisonment for a 2013 murder conviction, Choque bribed his way out of prison on unsupervised release, whereupon he drastically escalated his crime spree, raping numerous women and killing at least two more. He was sentenced to 30 years imprisonment for the latter crimes, and his case sparked a heated debate on the treatment of recidivistic offenders across the country.
Reynhard Sinaga	United Kingdom	2015–2017	48	An Indonesian student in Manchester, UK, who was convicted on 136 counts of rape, 14 counts of sexual assault, eight counts of attempted rape and one count of assault by penetration. He targeted young heterosexual men who were leaving nightclubs and raped his victims by bringing them to his flat under non-sexual pretences and drugging them with GHB. He filmed the assaults, and police claim there are at least 195 victims.
Parizian Calin	United Kingdom	2016–2018	4	Convicted in 2019 of four counts of rape committed as part of the Manchester child sex abuse ring.
Stewart Weldon	United States	2017–2018	11	Habitual criminal from New York City; raped, beat, and tortured women in Springfield, Massachusetts; three of the women he ended up killing and hid their bodies in his house, which he was also sharing with his mother.
Gemma Watts	United Kingdom	2018	4–50	British woman who was jailed for grooming girls as young as 13 into sex by dressing up as a man.
Joseph McCann	United Kingdom	2019	11	English-born career criminal who sexually assaulted and raped victims, ranging from children to elderly women; sentenced to 33 counts of life imprisonment.
Zhenhao Zou	United Kingdom and China	2019–2024	10	Chinese serial rapist and former PhD student who drugged and raped 10 confirmed women in United Kingdom and China while studying at University College London, with police believing the true number of his victims may be as high as 50 or more. He filmed his attacks for his own sexual gratification. He was convicted of 28 offences at Inner London Crown Court on 5 March 2025 and sentenced to life imprisonment on 19 June 2025, with a minimum term of 24 years before he would be eligible for parole.
Kris Wu	China	2020	3+	Chinese-Canadian rapper and actor was publicly accused in July 2021 by Chinese university student Du Meizhu of raping her and 30 other women and girls. Wu was convicted of raping three women between November and December 2020 in November 2022.
Melissa Blair	United States	2020–2022	18	Serial rapist convicted of the statutory rapes of 18 underage boys, aged from 14 to 17 years old.
Ali Ghaffar	United States	2021–2022	6–8+	Serial rapist convicted of six attacks in West Springfield, Massachusetts, and is suspected of committing at least two others; sentenced in January 2025 to 22 years in prison.
Chao Xu	China	2021–2025	6	Committed multiple rapes, drug-facilitated sexual assaults, voyeurism offences and covert recordings of women in London between 2021 and 2025. In 2025, he pleaded guilty to 24 sexual offences against six women and was sentenced to life imprisonment with a minimum term of 14 years. The Metropolitan Police described him as one of the most prolific sexual predators they had investigated and believe he may have victimised hundreds of women. Police investigations uncovered evidence of repeated sexual offending, including assaults facilitated by drugs and the covert filming and photographing of women.

== See also ==
- Serial rapist
- Victimology
