= Andrei Kiyko =

Russian serial killer (born 1985)

- Born: Andrei Olegovich Kiyko; 1985 (age 40–41); Leningrad, RSFSR (present-day Saint Petersburg, Russia)
- Other names: "The Sosnovsky Maniac" "The Sosnovsky Ripper"
- Convictions: Murder x3 Attempted murder x3 Robbery involving sexual assault and rape x9
- Penalty: 22 years imprisonment (2008); 25 years imprisonment (2023)

Details
- Victims: 3+
- Span of crimes: 2004–2007
- Country: Russia
- State: Saint Petersburg
- Date apprehended: June 2008

Andrei Olegovich Kiyko (Russian: Андрей Олегович Кийко; born 1985), known as The Sosnovsky Maniac (Russian: Сосновский маньяк), is a Russian serial killer and rapist who assaulted at least fifteen women in Saint Petersburg from 2004 to 2007, three of whom were fatally injured.

Originally convicted of two murders and sentenced to 22 years, he confessed to one more in 2022, for which he was given an additional 25-year sentence.

== Early life ==
Little is known about Kiyko's early life. Born in Saint Petersburg in 1985, his parents divorced when he was five, after which his mother was granted full custody of him. At some point during his childhood, Kiyko suffered a severe head injury, which he later claimed caused him to experience visual hallucinations of a female silhouette carrying a lantern and clacking with heels to pursue him. Due to this, he was unable to sleep and would often walk aimlessly around the city.

This aspect of his personality was completely unknown to his mother due to her working the night shift, as well as to his friends and acquaintances, who simply regarded him as a friendly and calm man. Despite this, they noted that he seemingly had issues talking with women, frequently struggling to find interesting topics to talk about. He was also regarded well by his teachers, but some of them later noted that he seemingly enjoyed watching others fight, as he got along with hooligans and was always present as a spectator in brawls.

== Crimes ==
Starting sometime around early 2004, Kiyko began accosting random women he came across in Sosnovsky Park, asking them to go on walks with him. While he would occasionally steal their personal items and money, he later claimed that he only enjoyed the "process of the chase", and supposedly lost interest in the victim shortly after interacting with them.

As time went on, however, he grew more and more violent, resorting to physically attacking and raping his victims, which now also included minors. If a victim tried to resist him, Kiyko would either kill them or run away if the circumstances were against him. He was meticulous and very careful when perpetrating his crimes, wearing condoms to prevent catching venereal diseases and never sold things like phones to random buyers, fearing that they would remember him, and instead gave them to acquaintances. Most of his known attacks occurred in Sosnovsky Park, with victims sometimes being brought back to his mother's apartment or attacked at a bus stop on Prospekt Morisa Toreza.

=== Chronology ===
Local authorities have stated that they believe Kiyko's victims may number in the hundreds, as he accosted, assaulted, raped and even murdered on a frequent basis until his arrest. Due to this, his true number of victims is unclear, and the following list consists solely of his confirmed attacks:

- August 2004: attacked a 29-year-old acquaintance who sold flowers at a kiosk. After stealing her money, Kiyko suffocated her using her own bra. In another version of events, he dragged her to the grounds of a nearby sports school, raped her, and then strangled her with the laces of her sneakers. Not long after, he was drafted into the Russian Armed Forces.
- March 2005: attacked a young girl and dragged her to a secluded area, but was unable to rape her due to a non-standard zipper on her clothing. Using his confusion to her advantage, the girl pushed him away and started running - she eventually came across an elderly woman walking her dog, prompting her pursuer to run away. Soon afterwards, Kiyko was discharged from the army due to a head injury and returned to Saint Petersburg.
- April 25, 2005: murders a 27-year-old woman named Tatyana in Sosnovsky Park, after she attempted to break away from him. He initially confessed to this case after his arrest, but later recanted by recommendation of his lawyer and was thus not charged. It remained a cold case until his second confession in 2022.
- August 2005: Kiyko arranged to meet up with a former classmate, whom he lured to his own apartment on Sirenevy Boulevard and proceeded to rape her. He then dragged her out to Sosnovsky Park, where he drowned her in a nearby pond.
- December 2005: attacked a 23-year-old girl. In an attempt to save her life, the victim lied to him that she was pregnant, causing him to strangle her into unconsciousness. After robbing her, Kiyko left without killing her.
- April 2006: accosted a 15-year-old girl and, at knifepoint, forced her to walk with him to Sosnovsky Park. For reasons unclear, Kiyko felt sympathy for the girl, and after walking together for approximately two hours, he let her go without causing any harm.
- June 2006: dragged a 25-year-old woman into the park under the threat of a knife, intent on raping her. However, the victim's incessant screaming caused him to beat her into unconsciousness, after which he robbed her and fled. In another incident in that same month, Kiyko tried to drag away an 18-year-old woman walking her puppy, but the puppy distracted him long enough for her to break free from his grasp. The victim then went to a nearby road and flopped down on the asphalt in front of an approaching car. Kiyko unsuccessfully attempted to lift her up, and soon after fled.
- September 2006: he dragged away a 20-year-old woman into Sosnovsky Park, where he robbed and raped her. About an hour later, he robbed a 21-year-old woman, but released her without any further harm.
- December 2006: robbed and raped a 22-year-old girl in the park. On the following morning, he accosted and raped a 27-year-old pregnant woman.
- January 2007: Kiyko attempted to rape a 28-year-old girl, but her fierce resistance forced him to strangle her into unconsciousness instead and simply rob her. On another occasion, he stalked a 17-year-old girl after she left a taxi cab, then grabbed and dragged her to Sosnovsky Park, where he raped and then robbed her. His final victim, a 17-year-old girl, was raped in the park under knifepoint and then again at his home for the rest of the night. In an attempt to conceal himself, Kiyko blindfolded her and escorted her out of his house, abandoning her on the street.

== Investigation and arrest ==
The investigation into the sudden uptick of attacks and rapes in the area lasted about a year and a half. From the very beginning, investigators believed that they were perpetrated by a single offender, as most victims described their assailant as a very slender Russian man who appeared to be in his late teens or early 20s. At one point, one of the operatives decided to further look into the case of the girl who had drowned in the pond, finding that her former classmate - Andrei Kiyko - had reportedly arranged to meet with her on the day she was found dead.

After a closer look into the girl's death revealed that she had likely been murdered, and with victims' testimonies regarding the layout of the rapist's apartment, Kiyko was swiftly arrested. Not long after, he willingly started confessing to his crimes, attributing a total 14 attacks to himself - 9 robberies, three attempted murders and two murders.

== Trial and imprisonment ==
Before he could be put on trial, Kiyko was ordered to undergo a psychiatric evaluation at the Saint Petersburg Psychiatric Hospital No. 6, which concluded that he was insane. Unsatisfied with the results, Justice Elena Volkova ruled that he should be re-examined at the Serbsky Center in Moscow - the results from this ruled that Kiyko was sane, but suffered from unspecified health issues.

Eventually, he was put on trial for the cases to which he had confessed. While family members demanded that he be given a life sentence, prosecutor Natalya Kuznetsova took into account Kiyko's illness and willing confession and instead demanded 25 years imprisonment. In the end, he was found guilty of a majority of the charges and sentenced to 22 years imprisonment. Upon hearing the verdict, the mothers of the deceased victims expressed that while they felt disgust whenever they looked at Kiyko, they were still satisfied with the verdict and wanted to move on.

=== 2022 confession and sentence ===
In June 2022, news sites reported that Kiyko had spontaneously confessed to a third murder dating back to 2005. In said confession, he claimed that on April 25, 2005, he accosted a 27-year-old woman named Tatyana at Sosnovsky Park, using his usual method of threatening at knifepoint. However, she resisted him too heavily, which supposedly forced him to strangle her and discard the body within the park's confines.

Soon afterwards, Kiyko was charged with this murder and brought to court in Saint Petersburg. He eventually recanted his confession, claiming the police had extracted it from him by force, but as he had provided details only the killer could know, he was found guilty and given an additional 25-year sentence to be served concurrently with his previous one.

=== 2025 Russia-Ukraine war desertion ===
On May 27, 2026, it was reported that police was searching Kiyko after he disappeared, Kiyko who signed a military contract to being deployed in the Russia-Ukraine war deserted from a hospital in mid 2025, the information came one year later after officials tried to hide it. As for August 2026, there's no public information about localization.

According to Fontanka reports, its possible that Kiyko has died in the war, his mother claimed that she received a document that indicated that Kiyko disappeared after a drone attacked a trench were he was located but no body was recovered, his death has not been officially confirmed by Russian authorities.

== See also ==
- List of serial rapists
- List of Russian serial killers
