= Gabriel Turgeman =

Convicted Israeli serial rapist

Gabriel Turgeman (Hebrew: גבריאל תורג'מן; born 1957), known as The Evasive Pedophile, is an Israeli serial rapist who raped at least five young girls in Ashdod from 2002 to 2004. For his crimes, he was sentenced to 45 years imprisonment, the highest sentence imposed on a sex offender in the country.

== Biography ==
Little is known of Turgeman's background. Born in Ashdod in 1957, he had previous convictions for drug and property offences, was married and had four children at the time of his arrest.

Between 2002 and 2004, there was a spate of serial rapes in Ashdod and Ashkelon, each of which followed the same modus operandi: the victim was always a young girl aged between 6 and 10, lived in a Haredi Jewish neighborhood and was abducted by an adult male driving a Renault Express. The first recorded incident occurred in November 2002, when Turgeman forcibly abducted a 10-year-old girl from one of Ashdod's neighborhoods and drove to an isolated area outside the city. There, he undressed, choked and beat the girl, before raping her in the backseat of his van. According to the victim, he claimed to have abducted other children in the past and that he would "bring out the knives and cut [her]" if she resisted. After raping her, Turgeman then drove the girl to her home and dropped her off, threatening her not to tell anyone.

In another incident, in March 2003, Turgeman approached a 10-year-old girl walking home towards school, and after asking her a question, he forced her into his van. He then drove to an isolated area, where he beat and threatened to kill his crying victim. He then undressed and raped the girl, again dropping her off at her home.

== Investigation and arrest ==
A task force was set up to investigate the case, with officers organizing ambushes in order to possibly ensnare their suspect. In addition, vehicle databases were checked for any cars matching the one that the suspect was seen in, and an identikit was created and spread. A number of people were arrested, but later cleared of the crimes.

On May 9, 2004, Turgeman was arrested shortly after his final attack, as a result of a DNA test that matched him to the crimes. While his identity was initially kept a secret by court verdict, the investigators lodged a petition to the Supreme Court to allow his name and photo to be publicized in order to allow potential victims to come forward. This request was granted by Justice Mishael Cheshin, despite the protests of Turgeman's attorney Yair Lachan.

== Trial and imprisonment ==
While awaiting trial, Turgeman vehemently denied any involvement in the crimes. He was brought before the court in Beersheba for the rape of five victims and an assault from nine years ago, for which he had been released due to lack of evidence. Turgeman was found guilty on all charges, and sentenced to 45 years imprisonment by Justice Revital Yaffa-Katz. While reading out his final statement, Yaffa-Katz said that taking into account the five destroyed families and lost childhoods on behalf of the defendant, it was the only sentence he could impose.

Turgeman later appealed the sentence to the Supreme Court, claiming that there were flaws in the investigators' methodology and the DNA examination in the lab, which was promptly rejected in 2012.

== See also ==
- List of serial rapists
