= Juan Carlos Sánchez (rapist) =

Serial child abuser acting in Colombia

Juan Carlos Sánchez Latorre (born September 13, 1980), known as The Big Bad Wolf (Spanish: El Lobo Feroz), is a Colombian technologist and serial rapist.

Authorities claimed that he has molested over 500 minors, with some speculating there being additional victims in Venezuela. While searching through Sánchez's home, police found 1,450 files with data depicting child rape, and 276 videos of Juan raping children. The abuses occurred between 2008 and 2011, although there are reports of around 50 cases that happened in 2005; the victims from these events affirmed that it was Sánchez who had raped them.

Sánchez frequented shopping centers, where he lured children aged between 9 and 14 years of age. Then, he would take them to hotels and force them to undress, taking photos and record them on video before abusing them. Those who resisted were threatened with a knife. Sánchez Latorre was temporarily imprisoned from March 15 to November 12, 2008, and upon his release from Barranquilla, he fled to Maracaibo, Venezuela, where he presented himself as a Venezuelan national named Danillo Santiago Luna.

== Imprisonment ==
Following his extradition to Colombia by the Venezuelan government, Sánchez was sentenced to 60 years' imprisonment, the maximum penalty available in Colombia, handed down by a judge in Barranquilla.

== See also ==
- Luis Alfredo Garavito
- List of serial rapists
