= Phillip Pizzo =

American serial rapist

Phillip A. Pizzo (born 1950), known as The Mall Rapist, is an American serial rapist who committed numerous assaults against women and girls in the Greater Boston area between 1983 and 1984. In November 1984, Pizzo was convicted of kidnapping and raping seven, and received 11 life imprisonment terms with a chance of parole. He later confessed to having raped 20 women. Pizzo's crimes caused a moral panic, due to which any girl or woman was advised to refrain from visiting malls or shopping centers unaccompanied.

== Biography ==
Phillip Pizzo was born in 1950, in the town of Winchester, Massachusetts. His father was engaged in entrepreneurial activities, thanks to which the family was well off, but despite this, both Phillip and his mother were often beaten by his father. Being weak-willed, Phillip's mother was indifferent about raising her children and acted coldly towards them, rarely acting when they were beaten by their father. This attitude greatly affected the young boy's personality, from which he developed an inferiority complex and began to demonstrate signs of sexual deviations. In 1966, he became a voyeur and indulged in transvestic fetishism, using his sister's underwear to satisfy his sexual needs. In 1968, shortly before graduating high school, Pizzo was arrested on charges of indecent behavior after exposing his genitalia to girls in public, but was let off with only a fine. After graduation, he was drafted into the Army, ostensibly to fight in the Vietnam War. Thanks to his father's financial support, he dodged the draft and was instead enlisted in the National Guard. After serving his time, he enrolled into the Northeastern University, graduating in the mid-1970s with a bachelor's degree in Public Administration and Economics. In 1976, he moved to Westford and married a woman who, after six years, left him due to personal dissatisfaction with their relationship. Due to the strong emotional attachment he felt towards his partner, the divorce took a heavy toll on Phillip, who, in order to improve his mental health and motivate himself, began to frequent nightclubs and adult movie theatres. After multiple unsuccessful attempts to find a new girlfriend, Pizzo began to exhibit misogynistic behavior and developed anger issues, resulting in outbursts against other people.

== Crimes ==
Between August 13, 1983, and January 19, 1984, Phillip Pizzo committed a series of kidnappings and rapes against women: most of his crimes took place in the Meadow Glen Mall, South Shore Shopping Plaza, Woburn Mall and Clover Leaf Marketplace, located in Natick, as well as the North Shore Shopping Center in Peabody. As victims, he chose random women aged 19–28, whom he abducted from the parking lots of shopping centers in the evenings, threatening them with a knife. After successfully abducting the victims, Pizzo would blindfold, gag and then bring them to his home in Westford, where he sexually abused and sodomized them for hours. After committing these heinous acts, he plied them with alcohol and made them take showers to eradicate any biological traces, before returning the girls to the parking lots and dropping them off. On a singular occasion, he dropped his victim off in a wooded area, throwing out her clothes from the car later on.

In January 1984, while attempting to kidnap another victim, the woman managed to free herself from her bonds and began to fight back, as a result of which she was stabbed in the mouth, damaging her lips and tongue. She managed to get out of the car and flee, reporting the incident to the authorities, providing them with a detailed description of her assailant's car and his appearance.

In the following months, Pizzo's car was spotted several times cruising the parking lots of various shopping centers, with him displaying inappropriate behavior as well. After being positively identified by the woman he had injured, Pizzo was arrested at his parents' home on March 8, 1984. After the arrest, a number of victims also came forward, positively identifying him as their rapist, as well as the house as the place where they had been detained.

== Trial ==
Despite Pizzo's claims of having raped 20 women, he was charged with assault, attempted rape, kidnapping and raping six women, as most of the other victims refused to out themselves out of fear. On November 6, 1984, Phillip Pizzo plead guilty to all charges, and was sentenced to 11 life imprisonment terms, with a possibility of parole.

== Aftermath ==
In 1985, Phillip Pizzo was transferred to the Massachusetts Treatment Center, where over the next 24 years he participated in many sex offender rehabilitation programs. After 25 years in prison, he applied for parole in 2010, but his request was rejected.

In 2015, he filed a petition for parole a second time, but the parole board found him unable to comprehend the gravity of his actions and accept the moral values of society, which is why they concluded that he would probably reoffend. In the end, his application was rejected again. His next possible parole bid was in 2020.

== See also ==
- List of serial rapists
