= Roland Cazaux =

French serial rapist

- Born: September 1958 (age 68); Dax, France
- Other names: "The Cat", "The Spider-Man"
- Occupation: Construction company foreman
- Status: Convicted
- Criminal charges: Rape, sexual assault, indecent assault
- Penalty: 14 years imprisonment (with a 15-year probation period)

Details
- Victims: At least 36 (16 rapes, 20 attempted rapes confessed)
- Country: France
- Locations: Basque Country, Arcachon, Landes, Soorts-Hossegor
- Date apprehended: February 20, 2002

Roland Cazaux (born September 1958), known as The Cat, is a French serial rapist.

== Biography ==
Roland was born in September 1958, in the commune of Dax. Before his crimes, he was simply known as an honest, working father with two boys, employed as a foreman of a construction company.

== Crimes and investigation ==
From 1987 to 2002, Cazaux raped at least 36 victims in Basque Country (chiefly in Arcachon and Landes). He was not considered a suspect by authorities, despite a 1982 conviction for sexual assault, for which he served a year in prison, and another for indecent assault, for which he served three months. In addition, Roland underwent medical treatment for a whole year, but psychiatric experts considered he was unlikely to reoffend. He would select potential victims during business trips. The rapist was given the nicknames "The Cat" and "The Spider-Man" because of his discretion, attacking always at night, entering through windows and avoiding detection.

The examining magistrate hired a profiler, Pierre Leclair, to make a profile of their rapist and his modus operandi. Leclair noted that "The Cat" pierced holes through the shutters of victims' homes, so he could observe his victims and make sure they were alone. In 1999, a gendarme from Dax, Jean-Philippe Cheradame, made the link between the rapes that took place in Soorts-Hossegor and the ones in Arcachon, revealing that the rapist had widened his hunting grounds. The 'Rape Cell 40' unit was created, bringing together the judicial police of Bordeaux and the Research Section of Pau. The media coverage of the investigation attracted the attention of a retiree from Soorts-Hossegor, who noticed a suspicious man driving a van in his neighborhood, monitoring a nearby villa. He wrote down his license plate numbers, and not long after, the 43-year-old Roland Cazaux was arrested on February 20, 2002, at his home. During the police interrogation, he confessed to 16 successful and 20 attempted rapes, all of which played out in the same way: he would break into the home of a woman living alone at night, cut the power supply, woke her up, then tied her hands to her back with a cord. He would then assure the victim that this was a burglary, before raping her.

== Trial and imprisonment ==
On the day of his opening trial before the assizes court of Gironde on November 28, 2005, the journalist Michaël Hajdenberg claimed in his article on Libération that Cazaux "wanted to work on himself, and showed empathy to his victims [...] [He] believed he could drown his vices in his social life; he did not succeed." According to experts, he was not mentally-ill and was fully responsible for his actions. According to Dr. Jean-Pierre Bouchard, the expert psychologist who examined him, only ten months after his release, Roland's dangerous fantasies became active again.

On December 16, 2005, the Assizes Court of Gironde found Cazaux guilty of 34 rapes and sentenced him to 14 years imprisonment, with a 15-year probation period. He was forbidden to make any contact with his victims, and was ordered to stay in the regions of Gironde, Landes and Pyrénées-Atlantique for 10 years. He was paroled on February 20, 2012. According to "L'Heure du Crime", on May 13, 2015, his lawyer indicated that he currently lives according to the demands of the court, and regularly has psychiatric check-ups.

== Documentaries ==
- "Roland Cazaux, the Cat" on December 10, 2006, and April 2008 in Faites entrer l'accusé, presented by Christophe Hondelatte on France 2. (in French)
- "The Cat Affair" (third report) in "...in Gironde" on May 13 and June 20, 2013, in Crimes on NRJ 12. (in French)

== Radio broadcasts ==
- L'heure du crime, presented by Jacques Pradel:
  - The Roland Cazaux Affair, on RTL, May 13, 2015 (in French)
  - Complete: The Roland Cazaux Affair, "The Cat" (June 28, 2013) [in French]
- Hondelatte raconte, presented by Christophe Hondelatte:
  - Hondelatte tells about Roland Cazaux, on Europe 1, December 8, 2017 (in French)
- Affaires sensibles, presented by Drouelle:
  - "Le Chat" du Sud-Ouest, on France Inter, October 20, 2020 (in French)

== See also ==
=== Related articles ===
- List of serial rapists

=== External links ===
- "Trial of 'The Cat': the accused crushed by his mother" Article published on November 29, 2005, in the Associated Press. (in French)
- 'The mother and daughter attacked by The Cat', published by Chrystelle Vincent on December 13, 2005, on a blog. (in French)
- "14 years imprisonment for 'The Cat'" Article published on December 16, 2005, on LCI. (in French)
