= São Paulo Monster =

Brazilian criminal

- Known for: Abducting and raping young girls in São Paulo, one attack in which he left a note
- Capture status: Unapprehended
- Wanted since: March 8, 1973

Details
- Victims: 5–12+
- Date: March – April 1973

The São Paulo Monster was a criminal who attacked at least five young girls between March and April 1973 in São Paulo, Brazil. He was never identified or captured.

== Attacks ==
On March 8, 1973, an unidentified man convinced a young girl from Vila Prudente to walk with him to a nearby apartment near Vergueiro Street, where he promised a gift for her. Once inside, he attempted to rape the girl, whereupon she screamed for help and alarmed residents of the building. The attacker, fearing for his capture, threw the girl against a wall, injuring her.

Initially, three children were known to have been attacked by the Monster. On April 2, 1973, "MPR," a six-year-old girl, was waving to her father, who was exiting his house. Several minutes later, a man told her that her father was waiting for her at a nearby gas station. The kidnapper then led her 400 meters away to the third floor of an apartment building, where the kidnapper raped her. Hours later, the girl was found by someone in the hallway, and she was taken to the Hospital das Clinicas.

On April 23, 1973, at 4:30 p.m., six-year-old "AGS" left her home to visit a nearby bakery in Pari to buy roulade. About an hour later, her mother, concerned about her absence, went to search for her. She was informed that AGS did not visit the bakery and was not seen near it. Her mother went to look at neighbors' houses; however, she could not locate her daughter. She then contacted her husband, who had just come from work, and with the help of friends, parents, and neighbors, they went on another search for the girl. However, they still could not locate her; it was at this time that they decided to inform a nearby police station about the girl's disappearance. Various RONE and ROTA police cars searched for the girl throughout the Pari district and attempted to find a lead. Later, a woman with a child in her arms, Maria Alves da Cruz, along with her husband, Antonio Alves da Cruz, entered the police station and explained what had occurred.

According to Antonio Alves, while he was lying in bed, his doorbell rang, and his wife went to check who was outside. Before opening the door, she asked several times who was outside. She didn't hear a reply, but she could faintly hear a child crying. Maria then alerted her husband, and he opened the door. The child was leaning against the wall with her clothes covered in blood and semi-unconscious. The girl attempted to cry but could not. Beside her, there was a piece of paper that read:

I had much sorrow for her because she is six years old. She does not even know where she resides. This is why I write this below, because this is where I got her and kidnapped her. Take her to the nearby police station, and they will deliver her to her house. I cannot say my name. Greetings. Where I will go, I cannot take her with me because I live in Franco da Rocha. Lives in the street Rio Bonito, near the street Rua Oracilas, near the church. Bairro of the Alto de Pari. Church on the end of the street Barão de Ladário, in Bra... Dear young woman, please read this. I leave the child with you. Take care of her and read the other part.

The police chief, Waltrides Gonçalves Cyrino, seeing the state of the child, sent her to the Ipiranga PS, making contact immediately with the 30º Distrito Policial, to ask them if there was a record for a missing girl. It was there that the facts then matched. The girl's parents were alarmed, arriving at the 26º Distrito with enough time to visit their child in the Hospital das Clinicas, where the girl was recovering.

Five-year-old "PHMC," also a resident of Vila Prudente, was playing outside her home when she met a man (who matched the later description in the investigation) who told her to go with him to a nearby apartment, where her mother was waiting for her. Once inside, the girl was raped. Crying and terrified, the girl ran upstairs, and the offender walked out.

== Investigation ==
The perpetrator was being hunted by police officers Hélio Braga, Waltrides Cyrino, and José Campanella. The attack on MPR was linked to that of AGS and another on Cipriano Viana Street. Initially, they could not determine if the attacker was black, white, tall, or short. But they later ascertained that he had brown skin, blue eyes, no mustache, frizzy and long hair, and wore red pants and a white shirt with several balls in it. He always selected girls, aged five or six, with green or blue eyes. Motorists and taxi and bus drivers were alerted to identify the man who was accompanying the child. The offender may have used a vehicle to drive with his victims or walked on foot to the apartments where he would rape them. Although he had five confirmed victims, police suspected that over a dozen children were attacked by him. Police chief Aldo Gagliano, as soon as he heard about the first case, began an investigation concerning the attacker.

Taxi driver José Manuel Correia de Almeida reported that as he was exiting the Estrada das Lágrimas in Alto do Sacomã, he picked up a man who was with a girl six years or younger. According to de Almeida, the girl was the same one that was attacked by the Monster, who had left the note confessing to the crime. He said, "I attempted to see the face of the man in the rearview, but he hid himself, preventing me from seeing his physiognomy. The child was crying and calling for her mother. To explain the child's tears, the man said that he left his wife in S. Caetano, where we went to. Near Avenida Almirante Delamare, he ordered me to stop, and avoiding being seen by me, paid for the ride and left the car with the child in his arms." Police could not have MPR identify the taxi driver because she was seriously injured in the hospital.

Several suspects were arrested, including Pedro Batista dos Santos, a resident of Nossa Senhora da Consolata. However, de Almeida said that dos Santos was not the man he gave a ride to. Police chiefs who worked in the case include Alberto Barbour, Aldo Gagliano, Hélio Braga, and José Campanella among the suspects. They also released a composite sketch.

In a police lecture carried over the phone by Campanella, Gagliano, Barbour, Braga, and Cyrino regarding the letter and the part that said "because I live in Franco da Rocha," it was suspected to point towards one of two things: a red herring to the police or an indication that he had been a patient in the Hospital dos Alienados. The hospital theory was supported by the police officers, and they began to investigate at the aforementioned hospital.
