= Murder of Sally Ann McGrath =

1979 murder in Peterborough, England

Sally Ann McGrath
- Born: 1957; Peterborough, England
- Died: 1979 (aged 21–22); Peterborough, England
- Cause of death: Homicide
- Known for: Murder victim

Sally Ann McGrath, aged 22, who lived with her parents in Tower Street, Peterborough, England, is an English missing person who was last seen in Cathedral Square, Peterborough at 2.45pm on 11 July 1979, after telling friends at The Bull Hotel that she was heading to the unemployment office on Church Street. She was found murdered in 1980. After a series of cold case reviews, 59-year-old Paul Taylor was convicted of her murder in 2012, as well as three rapes and other sexual offences against three other women, committed in the months leading up to the murder.

== 1970s investigation ==
Her disappearance sparked a huge investigation that lasted into the 1980s and saw over 3,000 people interviewed by a murder squad based out of Peterborough's Thorpe Wood police station and generated around 10,000 statements. No arrests were made at the time.

On 1 March 1980, her badly decomposed body was found by gamekeeper Keith Dickenson. The corpse was partly hidden in dense woodland known as Wild Boar Spinney, near Castor and Ailsworth, about 3 miles north-west of Peterborough city centre. A post-mortem found that her body had been there for between three and six months and that she had suffered two head fractures and a broken nose. A police search of the area yielded no new clues.

== 2011 developments ==
On 9 October 2011, 59-year-old Paul Taylor was charged with murdering her. Taylor, of Valentine Close, Fareham, Hampshire, was also charged with three counts of rape, a sexual assault, and an indecent assault in 1979. He appeared at Peterborough Magistrates' Court on 10 October 2011. The arrest followed a cold-case review, started in 2009 and codenamed Operatiom Highfields, into the death of McGrath and seven other linked offences. On 4 December 2012, Paul Taylor was convicted of McGrath's murder along with crimes against three other women – crimes including rape, attempted rape, and serious sexual assault. He was sentenced on 5 December 2012 and received life imprisonment with a minimum term of 18 years.

== See also ==
- List of solved missing person cases: 1950–1999
