= Sunil Rastogi =

- Born: c. 1979
- Occupation: Tailor
- Years active: 2004 - 2017
- Known for: Rape and molestation
- Criminal charges: Rape

Details
- Victims: 60+ girls (aged 7-10)
- States: Uttarakhand, Delhi, Uttar Pradesh
- Date apprehended: 15 January 2017

Sunil Rastogi (born 1979) is a serial rapist who was arrested on 15 January 2017, on charges of raping numerous minor girls. Sunil, had been targeting girls walking home from school for at least 13 years before his arrest in 2017. Rastogi, a tailor by profession, from Rampur, Uttar Pradesh, used to allure minors school girls, when they would return from school. He used to give a falsified reference identity of being victim's father friend and alluring the victim with clothes and snacks. He had reportedly assaulted hundreds of school girls from 2004 onwards. Rastogi had superstitious beliefs of dressing in red and blue, before attempting the crime, and believed that he would not be caught by his beliefs. According to sources, Rastogi is married and, has five children. Rastogi, used to assault minor school girls, in pattern execution of crime. Rastogi used to catch the train Sampark Kranti Express only on odd dates and would reach Delhi in search of prey.

== Arrest ==
Rastogi, was staying with his family in Rudrapur in Uttarakhand when he was arrested by Delhi Police, in January 2017. Previously, Rastogi had been jailed in Haldwani, Uttarakhand in a case of kidnapping and molestation of a minor girl. Since 2008, he has also been arrested four times in cases related to possession of drugs and kidnapping. On 15 January 2017, Rastogi was caught in East Delhi near New Ashok Nagar. The police was investigating a case of rape case of 7 year old, in New Ashok Nagar, from which the identity of Rastogi, was traced based from CCTV footage, of 7 year old victim interaction with the criminal.
