= Keith Simms =

Australian serial rapist (1955 – 2022)

Keith Simms (31 December 1955 – February 2 2022) was an Australian serial rapist. Known as the Bondi Beast, Simms raped 31 women between 1985 and 2001. Simms was identified as the culprit only several months after his death, based on matching DNA to 12 cases, while 19 other cases were linked via the method and description of the crime.

== Life ==
A local of La Perouse, Simms was married for 43 years until his death. Simms is of Indigenous Australian descent. He was known as "Magoo" to his friends. He worked for a number of employers, including National Parks and Wildlife Service, Botany Council, Bonnie Doon Golf Course and the University of NSW.

== Attacks ==
Simms' first assault took place at Clovelly in 1985. His last assault was at Waverley Cemetery in 2001. His victims were women ranging in age from 14 to 55. Most of his victims were abducted while jogging, while some others were assaulted after he broke into their home at night. During his attacks, Simms threatened his victims with a knife or made them believe he had a knife.

== Death ==
He died of kidney failure in February 2022. At his funeral Simms was remembered as a fan of the South Sydney Rabbitohs.

== Investigation ==
All of Simms attacks were investigated at the time they took place, but police were unable to make a breakthrough. The case was given various names in the media including "Centennial Park rapist", the "Bondi rapist", the "tracksuit rapist" and lastly the "Bondi Beast". In 2005, detectives discovered a DNA link between five cases from around 2000. In 2016, police distributed sketches and a DNA profile globally. During 2016 DNA profiling showed a familial match in the police database, narrowing the search. In 2019 police made a Y-DNA match, further narrowing the search to 324 individuals in a family tree. After a process of elimination, police identified Simms in September 2022, obtained a DNA sample via a warrant, and made a DNA match.

== See also ==
- Washington and Colorado serial rape cases
