= Smygaren =

Swedish serial rapist

Smygaren (The creeper) is an unidentified serial rapist, active in Gothenburg, Sweden during the 1990s. In June 2007, a man was arrested on suspicion of being the perpetrator, and was charged with five counts of rape and two counts of sexual assault. The suspected perpetrator was linked to at least one of the crime scenes via DNA evidence, with authorities also discovering that he had been convicted of rape in neighboring Norway.

In November 2008, the suspect was convicted by the Gothenburg District Court for four cases of serious rape and one sexual assault, and sent off to a closed psychiatric care clinic. A month later, the verdict was upheld, and the convicted refused to appeal it.

The nickname "the creeper" was because the man climbed through open windows to get to his victims. The rapist had the habit of lounging over his victims, who were asleep in their bed, and then holding a knife to the victim's neck.

== Timeline ==
- 2000: Unlawful threats. Sentence: Forensic psychiatric care.
- 2002: Unlawful threats. Sentence: One month of imprisonment.
- 2003: Rape, illegal threats, drug offences in Norway. Given three years imprisonment.
- 2007: Drug offence. Given a year of imprisonment.
- 2008: Attempted drug offence. This penalty is included from the judgment above.
