= Joro the Paver =

Bulgarian serial rapist and murderer

- Born: Unknown
- Motive: Unknown

Details
- Victims: 6-7
- Locations: Sofia, Bulgaria

Joro the Paver, also known as the Bulgarian Jack the Ripper, is a serial rapist and murderer from the Konyovitsa neighborhood, who operated in Sofia in 1968.

In the span of a few months, between six and seven rapes occurred, as a result of which a 69-year-old woman died in hospital. The nickname "Joro the Paver" comes from the paver found on the scene, wrapped up in handkerchief next to one of the victims.

The deaf and mute Milcho Milanov, from Rakita, was accused of being the perpetrator and arrested by police. Although he was sentenced and spent a significant amount of time in prison, he was later released due to lack of evidence.

In the beginning of the 1970s, a new rapist occurred, known as "Joro the Paver, the Second", who raped 10 victims and committed a double murder. In 1975, the perpetrator Georgi Yordanov was captured, sentenced to death and subsequently executed by firing squad.

The true identity of Joro the Paver (the first one) remains unknown, and it is also theorised that some rapes in later years have been his doing.
