= Uni-Phantom =

German serial sex-offender from 1994-2002

The University Phantom of Bochum, shortened to the Uni-Phantom, is a German serial sex offender who is said to have committed up to 21 assaults until 2002, first in Ennepe-Ruhr-Kreis and later moving to Bochum. The first act was committed in 1994 at Sprockhövel, with the last rape assigned to him occurring in December 2002.

== Assaults and perpetrator profile ==
The Phantom's first victim was a 12-year-old schoolgirl from Sprockhövel. On January 7, 1994 at 1:10 PM, she was raped in a wooded area on her way home from school. In September 1994, the perpetrator struck for the second time in Sprockhövel, sexually abusing a 44-year-old. He continued with the assaults around the area until June 1996, when he attacked in Bochum for the first time. From then on, he preyed mostly on young women in the vicinity of the Ruhr University Bochum, continuing until 2002. In 2003, another victim of the rapist came forward, with her assault occurring in August 2001. All of the rapes were determined to have been committed by the same perpetrator, after DNA analysis of semen traces.

The detailed police investigations have led to various findings over the years. Early sketches of the Phantom showed the culprit as a slim middle-aged man with a mustache. He committed all his acts in disguise, dressed in all black and with a baseball cap. The police assumed based on statements that the offender likely has good local knowledge of the Sprockhövel area, where he may have lived or have family ties. All of the crime scenes were near public transport stops, where the Phantom may have met his victims. He chose young women as victims because they usually had a different recreational behavior than older women, and also used public transport at night. In the vicinity of the university, there were many student residences and thus many young women: this is considered the main reason for the Phantom relocating from Sprockhövel to Bochum. He used a knife to threaten his victims.

Strikingly, there were intervals between the rapes―most of his rapes never occurred more than half a year before the next rape. The first series of assaults happened from 1994 to November 18, 1997. Subsequently, he struck again after almost three years, in the summer of 2000. Another assault followed in August 2000, before he paused yet again. The next known case is dated from August 2001, with more rapes taking place between summer and December 1, 2002, when he committed his last known rape. Since then, the Phantom has not struck again, leaving many questions unanswered.

== Investigation of the Messer Commission ==
The serial offender, baptized "The Uni-Phantom" by the press, was the subject of a large-scale manhunt by the Bochum police. After his last assault in 2002, in Bochum, up to 40 civil servants spent months working on potential crime scenes. The investigating Messer Commission (shortened to EK Messer) included at times up to 20 officers, including a profiler from Scotland Yard. Students and employees of Ruhr University, as well as men from Sprockhövel and Bochum, were asked for saliva samples; this move was strongly criticized, especially by some students. One law student who refused to submit a sample unsuccessfully appealed to the Federal Constitutional Court. Despite this, the 10,000 samples collected by the profilers proved unsuccessful. The Bochum police turned the course of investigations to work with the ZDF, and a review of the rape series was broadcast as part of the Aktenzeichen XY… ungelöst programme.
