= Niklas Eliasson =

Swedish serial rapist (born 1986)

Niklas Erik Axel Eliasson (today Niklas Eriksson; born 13 November 1986), also known as the Örebro rapist, is a serial rapist who was convicted of 14 assaults on women and sentenced to 12 years in prison. He was considered one of Sweden's worst serial rapists of all time. According to his lawyer, "[t]here was a feeling and an inner voice that urged and triggered him to attack women."

After serving eight years in prison, he was released on parole in 2018.

He has changed his name to Niklas Eriksson.
