= Teardrop rapist =

Moniker for rapist in Los Angeles

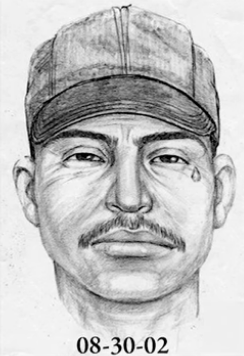
- Most recently released composite of the suspect
- Years active: 1996–2012
- Reward amount: $100,000
- Wanted by: FBI, LAPD
- Wanted since: LAPD: 1998, FBI: 2013

Details
- Victims: 35 sexual assaults
- State: California
- Date apprehended: Never

The "teardrop rapist" is a moniker for an unidentified rapist responsible for 35 sexual assaults on women, including minors, in the South Figueroa Corridor of Los Angeles, California, United States. The assaults began in 1996 and continued through 2012. He is believed to be a Hispanic male with a light complexion, and received his nickname from at least one teardrop tattoo under his eye.

The perpetrator was thought to have stopped his assaults in 2005, but in November 2011, a 15-year-old girl was attacked, and DNA evidence was linked to the same rapist, however, the victim did not see the tattoo that many of the previous victims had, perhaps due to tattoo removal. After an attempted assault on June 15, 2012, police announced plans to canvas the Hispanic neighborhoods of Los Angeles and offered a $50,000 reward for information leading to an arrest.

On July 27, 2013, LAPD announced their collaboration with the FBI, and increased the reward to $100,000, with $25,000 coming from the FBI. Also released was a new set of composite sketches.

== Crimes ==
DNA evidence from 11 of the sexual assaults were conclusively linked when the rape kits were tested.

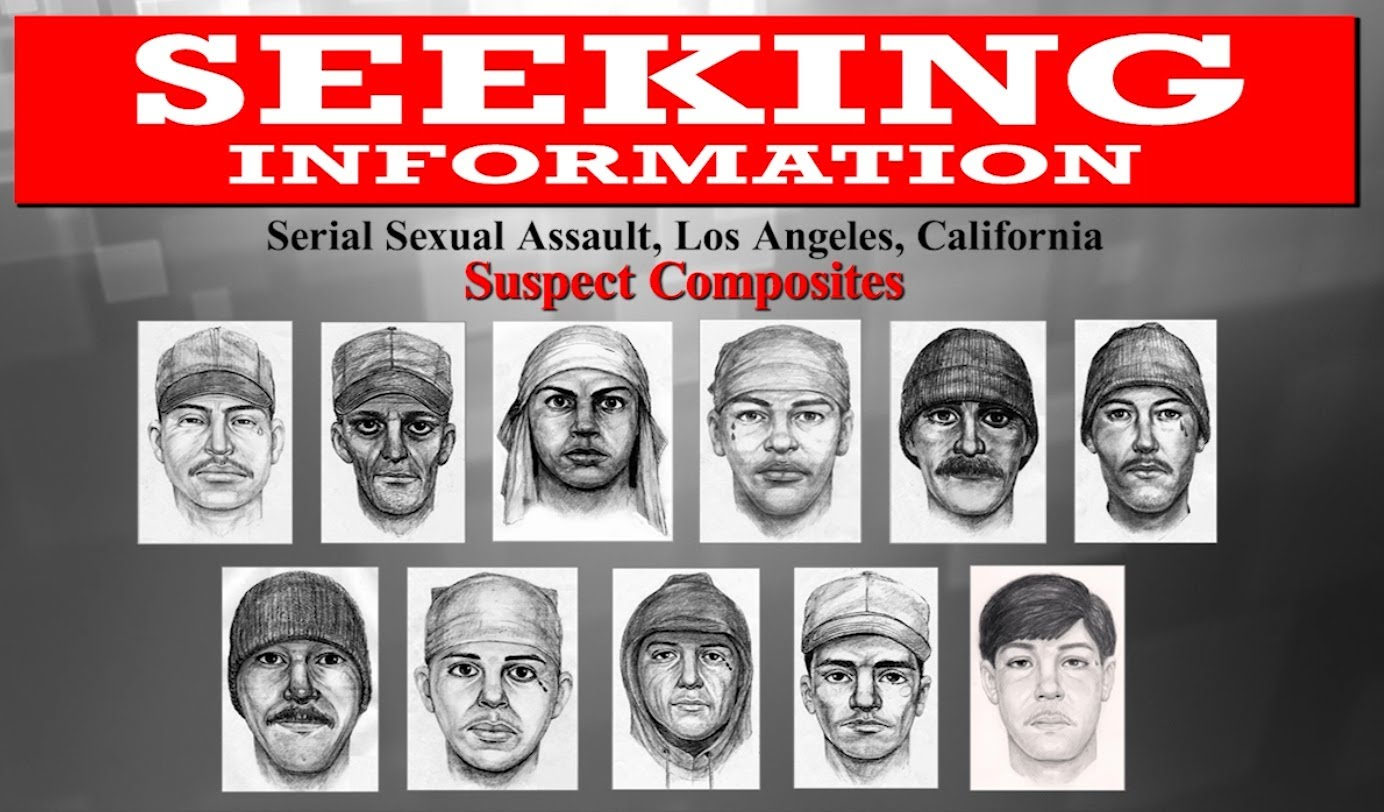
The 2013 set of composite sketches released by the FBI

== Mistaken identity exoneration ==
In 1999, Luis Vargas was sentenced 55 years to life for three sexual assaults that occurred throughout 1998 and 1999. The conviction relied mostly on eyewitness testimony by the victims, all three of whom identified Vargas as their attacker. Despite this, Vargas maintained his innocence the entire time he was in prison, filing as many appeals as he could. When the appeals went nowhere, Vargas contacted the California Innocence Project. The CIP requested that the evidence from the first victim who was allegedly attacked by Vargas be tested for DNA. The request was granted and it was found that the DNA from the rape kits did not match Vargas' DNA, but rather another man who had been sexually assaulting women for 16 years. Vargas was exonerated of the crimes in 2015 and given US$886,760 in state compensation.

== Suspect profile ==
=== Physical characteristics ===
While descriptions of the suspect have varied in sketches released by law enforcement, authorities believe the man who committed these crimes has these qualities:

- Hispanic male, possible light complexion
- Brown hair
- Approximately 5'2" to 5'6" in height
- Approximately 130 to 170 lbs
- May have a teardrop tattoo or some type of scar underneath an eye, if not removed
- Most likely between 40 and 55 years old (as of 2012)

=== Modus operandi ===
Throughout his crimes, this offender has exhibited similar behavior in his crimes:

- Preys on women and girls who are on their way to work or school
- Attacks between 5am and 8am
- The use of a handgun or a knife
- Talks to the victim beforehand, often asking for directions
