= Gene Morrison =

British rapist

Gene Anthony “Rocky” Morrison (born 1958) is a convicted sex offender and former fraudulent forensic detective who operated over three decades in the Hyde area of Greater Manchester, England, under the title Dr. Gene Morrison.

Known for his trademark sheepskin jacket, during the course of his deception, he managed to trick not only members of the public, but also many judges, lawyers and the police themselves, into believing he was a genuine expert in forensic science.

== Trial and imprisonment ==
During his trial held in 2007, he insisted on being referred to as Doctor throughout the entire trial, and the jury were supposedly reduced to laughter on many occasions throughout the proceedings. Morrison pleaded guilty to two charges and was found guilty on 20 of the remaining 23; he was sentenced to five years imprisonment, with police suggesting that Morrison may attempt to revive his forensic services upon release. It was reported that he had been paid at least £250,000 of taxpayers' money during the 27 years for his deception using fictitious qualifications.

A video documentary was made about Morrison. Entitled Crime Scene Conman, it was first shown on BBC1 on 25 March 2008.

== Sex offences ==
On 15 October 2009, Morrison was convicted of thirteen child sex offences (three counts of rape, six counts of indecent assault, four counts of engaging in sexual activity with a child) and one count of perverting the course of justice committed between the 1970s and 2007, with 19 other charges taken into consideration.

He was sentenced to an indeterminate term of imprisonment with a minimum of seven-and-a-half years, to be served cumulatively with the five-year sentence. Morrison became eligible for parole in 2017.

== See also ==
- Child sexual abuse in the United Kingdom
