= Tomasz Włodarek =

Polish serial rapist and murderer

Tomasz Włodarek (born 1975) is a Polish serial rapist and twice-convicted murderer, known as The Vampire of Świnoujście. Active between 1997 and 2000, mainly around the Świnoujście area, he brutally raped between six and fourteen young girls and women, in addition to killing a female customs officer and another woman. For his crimes, he was sentenced to life imprisonment.

== Early life and modus operandi ==
Little is known about Włodarek's early life. He was born on Mazowiecka Street in Świnoujście, where his family lived in a dilapidated house from the post-war era. Tomasz graduated from a vocational school with an unclear specialty, but did not have a permanent job - at some point, he is known to have worked as a cab driver. Włodarek rarely stayed at the family home, preferring the company of his girlfriend in nearby Karsibór. He was described as an inconspicuous man by his neighbors, who was constantly concerned for his companion. When she left for work for her afternoon shift, Włodarek would go out and search for victims in Świnoujście. Wearing a balaclava to hide his identity and carrying a knife, he would attack young women at different times of the day and locations, threatening them with the knife before sexually assaulting them. If the victims resisted, he would then proceed to kill them.

== Crimes ==
=== Murder of Jolanta Rzeszotarska ===
In September 1997, the 40-year-old customs officer had attended a work party, leaving in the early morning in the direction of Świnoujście's center. Some time later, her body was found by passer-by, hung from an oak tree in a forest near the Polish-German border. The autopsy showed that she had been strangled into unconsciousness, before her killer hanged her, probably to simulate a suicide. The only clue to the perpetrator's identity was epidermis found under Jolanta's fingernails.

There were several theories regarding the reason behind her murder. Since her jewelry had been stolen, some investigators considered robbery a possible motive, while others suspected that it was because the nature of her job. Jolanta had recently helped capture amphetamine smugglers from Poznań, and so, the police investigated several people related to the criminal underworld. Despite this, the case went cold, and in March 1998, the prosecutor's office discontinued the inquiry into her death.

=== Murder of Aneta Paśko ===
A 22-year-old student at the Medical College, Aneta Paśko lived in Świnoujście together with a roommate. On March 7, 2000, she left her apartment to go visit her boyfriend, but did not return the following day. The concerned roommate phoned Aneta boyfriend, who denied meeting her the previous day or being in contact with Aneta at all. The police were called in and they searched for her for two days. On March 9, Aneta Paśko's half-dressed body was found in a post-war bunker near the dunes, where she was supposed to meet her boyfriend. She had been brutally assaulted, with her physically-stronger attacker beating her with a blunt object and strangling her. The autopsy concluded that she had died as a result from these injuries, with only a single drop of semen serving as the evidence to her killer's identity. The macabre crime shocked the residents of Świnoujście, only to be shortly followed by a series of equally-brutal rapes.

=== Rapes ===
Despite the publicity surrounding his crimes, Włodarek was undeterred, instead increasing his activity even further. On June 17, donning his balaclava and a gun (it was never determined if it was a real or fake one, since police couldn't locate it), he attacked a 19-year-old girl on Świnoujście's dunes, forcing her into intercourse under the threat of the gun. On August 16, he repeats the procedure with a 17-year-old. Less than a week after that, in the Świnoujście Spa Park, Włodarek assaulted two girls - he raped only one, as the other asked him to leave her because she was pregnant. In December, the final rape against a 17-year-old occurred, this time in Warsaw. As a result of these attacks, residents were afraid for their lives and tourist visits to the islands dropped significantly. To counteract it, police had to take serious measures.

== Investigation, capture and sentence ==
In order to catch their rapist, authorities set up a special 8-member investigation group, composed of the Świnoujście Criminal Department and officers from the Criminal Investigations Department in Szczecin. Due to the high number of possible suspects, police asked for help Dr. Ryszard Pawłowski, a geneticist from the Medical University of Gdańsk. He used the same DNA tracing methods utilised for the capture of Leszek Pękalski and Krzysztof Gawlik, which revealed that the rapist had an AB blood type, common in only 40% of the Polish population. This eventually led to the so-called 'Sample 421' in April 2001, that of Tomasz Włodarek's brother. On June 16, Tomasz himself was arrested while he and a friend were eating fries at the "Gryf" bar. He did not resist arrest, but was visibly surprised.

Włodarek's trial began in April 2002, and was held in private out of respect for the victims. From the very beginning, Tomasz Włodarek denied all charges against him, claiming that he had been framed by smuggling groups with whom he allegedly had had a dispute. When that story was disproven, he pretended to be mentally ill, but subsequent psychiatric exams proved him to be sane. On June 19, 2002, the court sentenced him to life imprisonment with possibility of parole after 35 years. Włodarek appealed the verdict, but the Poznań Court of Appeal upheld it. However, that was not the end of his court appearances - an assistant professor noticed that his pubic hair connected him to the murder of Jolanta Rzeszotarska, as well as the 1997 rape of a 17-year-old girl committed shortly before the former crime. In 2003, he was given another count of life imprisonment, never to be released again. Despite the evidence against him, Włodarek continues to insist on his innocence. After learning of their son's crimes, his parents moved away from Świnoujście.
