= List of long-term false imprisonment cases =

This is a list of notable long-term false imprisonment cases.

== Cases involving children imprisoned by relatives ==
- Turpin case, Perris, California, United States, 29 years, discovered on 14 January 2018.
- Lydia Gouardo, Melun, France, 28 years, discovered on 20 November 1999.
- "M" and her children, Moe, Victoria, Australia, 28 years, discovered in February 2007.
- Mirella case, Świętochłowice, Poland, 27 years, discovered in July 2025.
- Elizabeth Wesson, her sisters, her children, her nieces and her nephews, Fresno, California, US, 26 years, discovered on 12 March 2004.
- Blanche Monnier, Poitiers, France, 25 years, discovered on 23 May 1901.
- Sheffield incest case, England, 25 years, discovered in November 2008.
- Alba Nidia Álvarez, Mariquita, Colombia, 25 years, discovered in March 2009.
- Mongelli case, Turin, Italy, 25 years, discovered on 27 March 2009.
- Elisabeth Fritzl and her children, Amstetten, Austria, 24 years, discovered on 26 April 2008.
- Paola Lucero, Mendoza, Argentina, 20 years, discovered in May 2009.
- South Wales paternal sex abuse case, Wales, 20 years, discovered in October 2019.
- "S", Waterbury, Connecticut, United States, 20 years, discovered on 17 February 2025.
- Rachael and Lisa Smart, Palm Springs, California, United States, 19 years, discovered in 1998.
- Rosalynn McGinnis, Poteau, Oklahoma, United States, 19 years, escaped in 2016.
- Piotr Kurek, Warsaw, Poland, 18 years, discovered on 21 August 1931.
- Unnamed 12-year-old girl, Puerto Mont, Chile, 17 years, discovered in 2022.
- "Genie", Arcadia, California, United States, 13 years, discovered on 4 November 1970.
- Schollenberger case, Lebanon, Pennsylvania, United States, 10 years, discovered in May 2020.
- Drenthe hermits family of six children, Ruinerwold, Netherlands, at least 9 years, discovered in October 2019.
- Viktoria, Katharina, and Elisabeth, Linz, Austria, 7 years.
- "Anna", Perryopolis, Pennsylvania, United States, 6 years, discovered on 6 February 1938.
- Jürgen Bartsch, Langenberg, Germany, 6 years, captivity ended in November 1952.
- Jeffrey Baldwin, Toronto, Canada, 4 years, discovered on 30 November 2002.
- Siders case, Hamden, Ohio, United States, 4 years, discovered on July 1, 2026.
- Byron Anthony McCane II, Kaw City, Oklahoma, United States, 2 years, discovered in 1983.
- Rader/Beighley case, Greenville, Pennsylvania, United States, 1 year, discovered in June 2014.
- Arthur Labinjo-Hughes, Solihull, West Midlands, England, 1 year, discovered in June 2020.

== Cases involving abducted children ==
- Sylvia Likens, a teenager tortured and repeatedly held captive in the basement by her caretaker and her children and their friends for three months in Indianapolis, US, discovered on 26 October 1965.
- Jaycee Dugard, kidnappers Phillip and Nancy Garrido, Antioch, California, US, 18 years, discovered on 26 August 2009.
- John Jamelske, serial rapist-kidnapper who, from 1988 to 2003, kidnapped a series of teenage girls and women and held them captive in a concrete bunker beneath the yard of his home in DeWitt, New York.
- Shawn Hornbeck and Ben Ownby, kidnapper Michael J. Devlin, Kirkwood, Missouri, US, 4 years, discovered on 12 January 2007.
- Sally Horner, kidnapper Frank La Salle, Camden, New Jersey, US, 1 year 9 months, discovered on 22 March 1950.
- Jayme Closs, kidnapper Jake Thomas Patterson, held for 88 days, discovered on 10 January 2019.
- Tanya Nicole Kach, kidnapper Thomas Hose, McKeesport, Pennsylvania, US, 10 years, escaped on 21 March 2006.
- Natascha Kampusch, kidnapper Wolfgang Přiklopil, Vienna, Austria, 8 years, discovered on 23 August 2006.
- Amanda Berry, Michelle Knight, and Georgina "Gina" DeJesus, kidnapper Ariel Castro, Cleveland, Ohio, US, 9 to 11 years, discovered on 6 May 2013.
- Katya Martynova and Lena Samokhina, kidnapper Viktor Mokhov, Skopin, Russia, 3 to 4 years.
- Anna Saito, kidnapper Kabu Terauchi, Tokyo, Japan, 2 years.
- Fusako Sano, kidnapper Nobuyuki Satō, Kashiwazaki, Niigata, Japan, 9 years, discovered on 28 January 2000.
- Santa Ana kidnapping accusation of 15-year-old girl, held by Isidro Garcia, Santa Ana, California, US, 10 years, discovered on 19 May 2014.
- Elizabeth Smart, kidnappers Brian David Mitchell and Wanda Barzee, Salt Lake City, Utah, and San Diego County, California, US, 9 months, discovered on 12 March 2003.
- Steven Stayner, kidnappers Kenneth Parnell and Ervin Murphy, Merced, California, US, 7 years, discovered on 1 March 1980.
- 7-year-old girl kidnapped by a school bus driver in Medellín, Colombia, 12 years, escaped in February 2024.
- Kaspar Hauser, Nuremberg, Germany, 16 years, released 26 May 1828.

== Cases involving sexual slavery of children ==
- Birmingham bathing cult
- Kidwelly sex cult
- Lambeth slavery case

== Cases involving adults ==
- Catharina Ulrika Hjort af Ornäs, Falun, Sweden, 33 years, discovered after 11 January 1837
- Colleen Stan, kidnappers Cameron and Janice Hooker, Red Bluff, California, US, 7 years, discovered August 1984
- Vera Talpayeva, Tatyana Melnikova, Yevgeny Shishov, Tatyana Kozikokova, Tatyana Nazimova, and Irina Ganyushkina, kidnappers Aleksandr Komin and Aleksandr Mikheev, Vyatskiye Polyany, Russia, 2 years, Ganyushkina escaped on 21 July 1997
- Omar bin Omran, Djelfa, Algeria, 26 years, discovered on 12 May 2024.
- Josefina Rivera, Sandra Lindsay, Lisa Thomas, Deborah Dudley, Jacqueline Askins, Agnes Adams, kidnapper Gary M. Heidnik, four months to one day, Philadelphia, US, escaped on 24 March 1987
- Zhang "Moumou", Zhang "Xuanxuan", Duan "Moumou", Jiang "Moumou", Cai "Moumou" and Ma "Moumou", kidnapper Li Hao, Luoyang, China, 21 to 2 months, Ma escaped on 3 September 2011
- Philadelphia basement kidnapping, US, 12 years, discovered on 17 October 2011
