= Lucero incest case =

Criminal case in Argentina

In May 2009, 67-year-old Armando Lucero was arrested by police in Mendoza, Argentina on incest charges. The main accuser, his daughter Paola, accused Armando of repeatedly raping her for over 20 years, during which time she gave birth to seven children. Paola decided to report the abuse after her father attempted to rape one of their shared daughters when she turned 16. DNA tests performed on Paola's seven children confirmed the paternity of Armando Lucero, who was subsequently nicknamed "The Monster of Mendoza" (Spanish: El Monstruo de Mendoza) and the "Jackal of the Fourth Section" (Chacal de la Cuarta Sección). The former name was coined due to similarities with the Fritzl case, in which the perpetrator, Josef Fritzl, was nicknamed "The Monster of Amstetten" by Spanish media.

Armando had eight children with his first wife. The pair had married when he was 22 and she was 13, with all their children born within ten years. He had six additional children (three sons and three daughters) through a mistress, whom he later married. Armando briefly held a job as a hotelier in the 1960s, but later forced his work duties on his wife, who eventually kicked Armando out of the house due to his inappropriate behaviour around their children. Psychoanalyst Hugo Marieden of the Argentine Psychoanalytic Association described Lucero as a psychopath who shunned the outside world and treated his children "without human dignity".

Armando began abusing Paola when she was nine, leading to her first pregnancy at age 15. Two other daughters also alleged that their father had also raped them beginning when they were around eight, which was preceded by groping in the years before. One of Armando's sons from his first marriage accused his mother of covering up the abuse through her position as a court officer. By the time of his arrest, the seven grandchildren he had fathered with Paola were aged 2 to 19. The births were all registered at clinics, with Paola presenting as a single mother and listing unknown fathers.

Armando was held at the penitentiary of Mendoza on charges of aggravated sexual assault in a paternal relationship (abuso sexual agravado por el vínculo paterno). He was twice hospitalized for a smoking-related respiratory disease. On 5 May 2010, Armando Lucero died at Central Hospital of Mendoza.

The case is similar to that of the 2016 Domingo Bulacio case which also took place in Argentina.

== See also ==
- List of long-term false imprisonment cases
- Kidnapping of Jaycee Lee Dugard
- Lydia Gouardo
- Mongelli case
- Natascha Kampusch
- Sheffield incest case
- Álvarez incest case
- Moe incest case
