= Linz sisters =

Child neglect case

The Linz sisters, Viktoria, Katharina, and Elisabeth, are three women whose mother gradually withdrew them from school by creating and reinforcing a story that their father was a monster, to the extent that they believed they must absolutely avoid him. This resulted in the children increasingly remaining indoors in a house of incredible filth for seven years between 1998 and 2005. They are known as the Linz sisters because the case took place in Gramastetten near Linz, Austria. Early media reports that the mother had kept the children prisoner and that they had invented a language were contradicted by a special report in Le Figaro. In that report, Margareth Tews, the tutor of the youngest two, stated they were busy re-accustomising them to the presence of their father.

== Background ==
The mother of the three sisters gained custody of them following her divorce at the age of 53. Afterwards, she suffered a mental breakdown. Le Figaro reported that the children, then aged 7, 11, and 13, gradually became absent from school, and they remained at home of their own accord in a smart, upper middle-class suburb. When they were discovered, the house had no running water and was filled with waste and excrement. The mother was said to have been summoned to court nine times during the seven years after complaints were made by the father, who was then a second magistrate of the court of appeal at Linz, and by neighbours, but officials were never persuaded to investigate the case more closely.

Official records, such as those made available to a wider public by the Austrian Parliament and by local education authorities following the outcry after initial publication of the case, show that the sisters were frequently absent from school but took part in school events: Elisabeth until 2000, Katharina until 2003, and Viktoria until 2005.

== Legal proceedings ==
In November 2007, the mother Ingrid L. was found guilty of child neglect by the Carinthian State Court and sentenced to indefinite detention at a facility for dangerously disturbed offenders. The Supreme Court overturned the conviction in May of the following year and ruled on 26 October 2008 that the mother be released, with court psychiatrist Reinhard Haller testifying that she would neither pose a danger to society nor would there exist any danger of her again committing acts of a similar nature, given that she did not retain, and would never again have, custody of her children.

== See also ==
- Fritzl case
- Natascha Kampusch
- List of long-term false imprisonment cases
