= Ohio House of Horrors =

Ohio House of Horrors may refer to:

- The Anthony Sowell case, where a man murdered 11 Ohio women and hid their corpses in his house from 2007 to 2009.
- The Siders case, a 2026 criminal case of severe, prolonged child neglect and abuse of 16 children ranging from 20 months to 18 years, with 4 adults arrested.
