= Isidro García =

Isidro García or Isidro Garcia may refer to:

- Isidro García (boxer), a former WBO Flyweight Champion boxer (named Isidro Ayala García)
- Isidro Medrano Garcia, a man accused in a 2014 Santa Ana kidnapping case involving allegedly kidnapping and raping a 15-year-old girl in 2004 and holding her captive until 2014
