= Mongelli =

Mongelli is a surname of Italian origin, a patronymic or plural form of the personal name Moncio, which means "little monk". Notable people with the surname include:

- Gianni Mongelli (born 1957), Italian politician
- Mario Mongelli (born 1958), French football player and manager

== See also ==
- Mongelli case, a sexual abuse case in Turin, Italy
- Mongillo, a variant
