= Luoyang sexual slavery case =

Long-term captivity and abuse case in Luoyang, China

- Native name: 洛阳性奴案
- Location: Luoyang, Henan, China
- Date: October 2009–September 2011
- Attack type: Kidnapping, rape, sexual slavery, false imprisonment, murder, torture
- Deaths: 2
- Victims: 6
- Perpetrator: Li Hao
- Verdict: Death
- Convictions: Rape; Murder; Prostitution; Illegal pornography; Illegal detention

The Luoyang sexual slavery case refers to the abduction, long-term captivity, and sexual enslavement of six young women between 2009 and 2011 in Luoyang, Henan, China. The perpetrator, Li Hao, confined the victims in a dungeon underneath his residence. Two of the women were killed by Li, who forced other victims to assist him in the killings. Li was arrested and the survivors were freed in September 2011 after one victim escaped.

In 2012, a Luoyang court convicted Li of rape, murder, organizing prostitution, producing illegal pornography, and illegal detention of sex slaves, and sentenced him to death. The Supreme People's Court approved the death penalty, and Li was executed in 2014.

== Background ==
=== Perpetrator ===
Li Hao after his arrest

Li Hao (Chinese: 李浩; pinyin: Lǐ Hào; born February 1977) was born in Xinye County, part of Nanyang, Henan, where he obtained a college degree. He worked as a firefighter with Luoyang's fire bureau, and by 2009 was employed as a clerk in the quality control sector of Henan's technology bureau. At the time of his arrest, Li was married to a 24-year-old woman, with whom he had an eight-month-old son.

According to Li, his wife had no knowledge of his dungeon and sex slaves, with whom he spent around two weeks per month. He told her he found a night time job. Li and his son lived in a separate building in Luoyang.

=== Victims ===
The six women, identified only by their surnames, were karaoke bar workers or hostesses. Two were surnamed Zhang (张), and the others were surnamed Duan (段), Jiang (姜), Cai (蔡), and Ma (马); The victims were between 16 and 23-years-old at the time of abduction and were kept in captivity between two to 21 months. Three of the four survivors were local to Luoyang and one from Xinxiang.

== Murder and rape case ==
=== Makeshift dungeon ===
In August 2009, Li bought a residential compound in Luoyang's central Xigong district and excavated a concealed underground structure connected by a narrow tunnel to rooms four meters below. The dungeon has been described as a 'fortified underground cellar' and 'subterranean prison'.

The cellar had an area of less than 20 square meters (220 sq ft). Li Hao installed seven metal doors to prevent his victims from escaping. The dungeon had a total area of 215 square meters.

Li testified that he was inspired by the financial success of pornographic websites he viewed in 2007 and intended to make money from online pornography and soliciting his victims for prostitution at nearby hotels. Li starved his captives so that they would have little energy to escape. He would feed them once every two days. Li later provided computers without internet access so the captives could watch films and play games, but permitted them to leave only when arranging commercial sex with clients. The women ate and defecated in the bedrooms, and the cellars were described as 'dank' and 'smelly'.

In October and December 2009, Li first lured two women, Zhang Xuanxuan (张宣宣, an alias) and 18-year-old Duan, into the basement, detaining them through violence, blackmail, and coercion.

In December 2010, Li used the same method to detain 19-year-old Jiang in his dungeon.

In March, May, and July 2011, Li successively brought 20-year-old Zhang Moumou (alias), 16-year-old Cai, and 23-year-old Ma. He raped the women repeatedly and impregnated Zhang Moumou.

He repeatedly abused and raped the six women, forcing them into prostitution. He filmed them and posted the pornography online for money. He later forced three of the captives to kill two of the other women.

=== Murder of Zhang Xuanxuan and Cai ===
In July and August 2010, Zhang Xuanxuan attempted to attack Li while he was working in the cellar. Li restrained her with handcuffs and later compelled another captive, Duan, to assist in strangling Zhang by telling Duan that he would release her; Zhang's body was buried under the bed area.

In May 2011, Cai was found to have a gynecological disease and could no longer participate in the forced pornography. He decided to kill her and directed Duan, Jiang, Ma, and Zhang Moumou to beat, starve, and torture Cai, as well as force her to eat feces and drink urine. Following another assault in late July 2011, Cai died and her body was placed in a concrete pit.

=== Pornography ===
Between March and April 2011, Li forced the women to perform in pornographic shows online. Li purchased a computer and webcam, opening a broadband connection into his dungeon. Li forced Duan, Jiang, Ma, Zhang Moumou to strip for 'customers' in his dungeon. He filmed these performances and sold them to viewers on Tencent QQ for prices of "50 yuan for 30 minutes" and "100 yuan for 50 minutes". At the time of his arrest, Li had produced more than 50 explicit videos and collected thousands of yuan from viewers through Alipay and other forms of online payment.

=== Prostitution ===
From August 2011 to early September 2011, Li took Duan and Zhang Moumou to a nearby hotel and welfare lottery shop in Xigong to engage in prostitution. He received 700 yuan in total. On the evening of 2 September 2011, Li forced Duan, Ma, and Zhang Moumou to go to the same place for prostitution. In the early morning of the next day, Ma seized the opportunity to escape and call for the police. With the cooperation of Ma, the public security personnel located the basement and rescued Jiang and later rescued Duan and Zhang Moumou from the hotel and welfare lottery shop.

Li tried to flee Luoyang and went to his sister Li Yuan to borrow money, receiving 1,000 yuan, but was detained soon afterwards on 6 September. Li Yuan was later convicted of harboring a criminal and sentenced to probation.

=== Arrest and execution ===
A reporter named Ji Xuguang from Guangzhou was one of the first people to expose the case to the media. On 30 November 2012, Li was sentenced to death. The Intermediate people's court of Luoyang found Li guilty of rape, murder, prostitution, illegal pornography, and illegal detention. A higher court upheld the sentence, and the Supreme People's Court approved the death penalty. Li was also deprived of his political rights and fined 10,000 yuan ($1640). He was expelled from the party and public office.

On 21 January 2014, after meeting relatives in the detention house, Li was executed, aged 36.

=== Victims ===
The two women who were murdered, Cai and Zhang Xuanxuan, had been dead for months by the time police found their corpses. The remaining four women were convicted for working with Li to kill Cai and Zhang Xuanxuan. Duan, Jiang, and Zhang Moumou were charged with murder, but were shown leniency and given lighter punishments in view of the coercion they faced. According to Xinhua, Jiang and Zhang Moumou were sentenced to probation and Duan was jailed for three years.

A lawyer from Changsha, Zhang Yan, represented the three women in court. Zhang said that Li's death penalty was predictable, but that she tried to lobby for lighter sentences.

Police said that the victims may have been suffering from Stockholm syndrome.

== Public response ==
In 2011, Director of the Luoyang Public Security Bureau, Guo Congbin suggested that the local police were ineffective in detecting Li's crimes. Guo said that four police officers were suspended and that entertainment areas such as nightclubs and bars were to be more thoroughly inspected. The internet was to be subject to intense cleansing of pornography sites.

Reporter Ji Xuguang, from the Southern Metropolis Daily, was covering the case and was detained for leaking 'state secrets'. Ji traveled to Luoyang to report on the Li Xiang case and brought it to national attention. For some time, local newspapers were forbidden from reporting on the case, as officials feared it would tarnish Luoyang's image and bid to win a 'Civilized City' award. At the time, local authorities were not aware of the case.

Authorities denied claims of coverup. Li's story was widely covered and spread by national media, with Li's crimes terrifying and being severely condemned by the public.

The sex slave case is described in detail in a book written by Liu Baiju (刘白驹) titled Sexual Offenders: Psychopathology and Control (性犯罪：精神病理与控制).

== See also ==
- Gary M. Heidnik
- Fritzl case
- Natascha Kampusch
- Ariel Castro kidnappings
