= Colt clan incest case =

Pseudonym of an Australian family who practised incest for several generations

The Colt family incest case concerns an Australian family discovered in 2012 to have been engaging in five generations of incest beginning with the parents of the matriarch, "June", being brother and sister. June met and married "Tim", who emigrated from New Zealand in the 1970s. They all lived on a farm near Boorowa, New South Wales. The family members' true identities remain unknown to the public; the name "Colt" is a pseudonym used by New South Wales courts and government agencies, as are all of the family's given names.

== Background ==
=== Immigration from New Zealand ===
"June", born in 1948, and "Tim Colt", born in 1943, were originally from New Zealand. June, who was the product of brother-sister incest, married Tim in 1966. The couple had seven children together: Martha, Frank, Paula, Cherry, Rhonda, Betty, and Charlie, before moving to Victoria in the 1970s. Tim Colt began to rape Betty when she was 12. In 1997, Betty, wanting to know if June could donate a kidney to a granddaughter, found out that her mother June was inbred.

=== Growth of the family ===
The family grew to nearly 40 members including grandparents, mothers, fathers, sons, daughters, aunts, uncles, nieces, nephews, and siblings, all engaging in various forms of incest. Many of the children suffered from deformities and medical problems. School attendance was transient and happened only when welfare officers visited the family, and once there the children needed remedial teaching. As a pastime, the children also engaged in mutilating the genitals of animals.

Children and adults had regularly engaged in sexual activities which conceived children, some with genetic deformities. Most of the children had fungal infections. In order to hide the truth of the pregnancies, the girls would sometimes miscarry on the farm or fatherhood was attributed to outsiders from outside Australia coming to the country for work or tourism. There were incidents of the girls being tied to trees and raped by the boys. They had no access to running water, showers, toilets, or hygiene products.

The case has been described by Detective Chief Inspector Peter Yeomans as "like nothing I've ever seen," and was considered by many to be so shocking that, in a rare move, the New South Wales Children's Court allowed full details to be made public, albeit with all names changed to pseudonyms for the children's protection, including the family name of "Colt."

=== Relations with outsiders ===
After the death of June in 2001 and Tim in 2009, the family was led by Betty Colt. Betty and her younger brother, Charlie, had twelve children together. The family received multiple welfare payments, including disability and family support.

Starting from the 1990s, the family was known to frequently relocate between South Australia, Western Australia, and Victoria before locals became suspicious of their activities. They relocated to New South Wales, thirty kilometers (19 miles) outside of the small town of Boorowa, three and a half hours southwest of Sydney. The police ultimately discovered nearly forty members of the family living under squalid conditions in tents and shacks. They sometimes performed as a musical band that was originally formed by Tim.

== Investigation ==
=== Discovery of the case ===
Knowledge of the family came to authorities in June 2010, which led to seven "risk of significant harm" reports. However, an official investigation was not opened until July 2012 when a child reported overhearing another child at a local primary school speaking of an unkempt girl, living in the bush, who was pregnant with a child fathered by a brother. The child heard the girl state that one of her sisters was pregnant and they did not know which of her brothers was the father.

=== Police and welfare services involvement ===
Over the next year, police tracked the family down and, after obtaining an understanding of the living conditions in the family's encampment, put several children in foster care, including Bobby (Betty's son with her younger brother) and Billy (Betty's son with her older son). Police discovered the living area of thirty-eight members of the family in the bush, living under squalid conditions in tents and shacks, on the outskirts of Boorowa. The family were charged with incest and child neglect.

Betty Colt legally disputed the charges and attempted to regain custody. After tracking the cell phone activities of Betty, police discovered text messages of a sexual nature sent to her son, Bobby. She and Bobby had made plans to abduct Billy from foster care. Genetic testing showed that Bobby was the product of incest between Betty and a father or full brother.

The case has been described as unique because of the reluctance of the victims to come forward.

=== Court findings ===
The Children's Court of New South Wales took the unusual step of publishing its decision permanently removing the children. In the court's findings, the neglect of the children and genetic evidence were viewed as dispositive in the matter. The court held that "there is no realistic possibility of restoration of any of the children [to their biological family]."

== Later issues ==
A number of attempts by the elder family members to establish connections with the younger have been blocked by the courts. While in care, the children started by often displaying sexual behaviour, whether between themselves or with caretakers, although these habits faded over time.

Australian police attempted to deport Betty to New Zealand, the country of her birth, after the completion of her sentence, but Betty fought the deportation. She was released from the deportation centre in November 2015 and is now residing in South Australia with her daughter Raylene and at least three other male relatives. She also attempted to contact other relatives through Facebook.

== See also ==
- Goler clan
- Moe incest case
