= 2019 South Wales paternal sex abuse case =

Child sexual abuse case in Wales

In October 2019, a 61 year-old man from South Wales was sentenced to 33 years in prison for serious sexual offences against three of his daughters, spanning 20 years, one of whom was also his granddaughter. He frequently raped his daughters from the ages of 12–14, fathering six of his own grandchildren with one. He also arranged for other men to rape his daughters.

The offender cannot be named to protect the lifelong anonymity afforded to his victims.

== Crimes ==
The offender brainwashed, manipulated, and systematically raped three of his daughters during a 20-year period.

=== Grooming ===
The offender groomed and controlled his daughters by invoking magic. He immersed them in a "false world" involving "witchcraft and mysticism" and convinced them that they were receiving emails from a psychic named Amelia Sanctuary, which were really from him. The messages demanded sex with him and with other men.

=== First daughter ===
The offender controlled and sexually abused his first daughter for about 20 years. He began raping her when she was 14 years old, making her pregnant in a matter of months. She agreed to deceive social services by claiming the baby's father was a boy at her school. Then her father raped her "nearly every night", making her pregnant a second time at 16. She became pregnant nine times in total, giving birth to six children. DNA evidence proved he is the father of all six. Two of the pregnancies ended with a miscarriage and one was ended by abortion tablets given to her by her father to conceal it. He was extremely controlling towards her and emotionally manipulated her, saying for example: "We are soul mates, we have been together through so many lifetimes. We are meant to be together." He gave her a "witch's ring" and emailed instructions to her that he pretended were from the psychic Amelia, including to drink his urine. He groomed her into believing all of this was "a normal upbringing". When on bail following his arrest, he continued raping her, pitching a tent near a beach for this purpose. After he covered up a resulting pregnancy by giving her abortion tablets, she was too frightened of him to seek medical treatment and later recalled, "I was too chicken to go to the clinic".

=== Second daughter ===
The offender raped his second daughter "hundreds of times" for four years during her teens and also had her raped by a second man. This daughter's first time being forced into sex by her father occurred in a forested area. Then he raped her "at least two to three times a week" in various locations including her bed and his car. The second man, a family friend, raped her in his own bedroom in a nearby flat, watched by her father. She believes he paid her father. She eventually escaped the abuse by leaving her home. She was initially too frightened to report the crimes due to fears about "losing contact with her siblings". She later reported the abuse to police because she feared for other "girls in the family of that age".

=== Granddaughter ===
The offender also controlled and systematically raped one of the daughters of his first victim from when she was aged 12 or 13 until her late teens. DNA evidence proved that he is both her father and grandfather. He intimidated and controlled her by again invoking witchcraft and by tying her up and sexually assaulting her when she rejected his demands, making her "too scared" to refuse him. He concealed the abuse by demanding she keep it a secret and by telling her "Nobody will believe you and you will be thrown in the loony bin". He raped her several times a week in various locations, such as the family home, his car, a caravan, and a lay-by. He continued sexually abusing her while on bail following his arrest.

== Trial ==
In late September 2019, the offender went on trial in Swansea Crown Court for 36 rape counts and for an assault by penetration count. One of the rape counts was for procuring rape. He denied all counts. He cannot be named due to the legal necessity of protecting the lifelong anonymity of his victims.

On 10 October 2019, the jury unanimously convicted him on all 37 counts, after deliberating for four and a half hours. He remained expressionless during the verdict and was remanded in custody.

Paul Jones, a Detective Chief Inspector at Dyfed–Powys Police, said the perpetrator committed "the most serious sexual offences" with an impact that "is very difficult to summarise". He thanked the victims for "their bravery and composure", which "led to the conviction of a very dangerous offender". He added: "I want anyone who has suffered abuse to know that if you find the courage to come forward, you will be taken seriously, and police will work tirelessly to bring offenders to justice.”

=== Sentencing ===
On 18 October, Judge Paul Thomas QC jailed the offender for 33 years, with a further seven years on extended licence, saying that his "totally evil" crimes "plumbed the depths of depravity". He told the "cowardly" and "wicked" abuser: "You raped them countless times, well into the hundreds. You took advantage of their extreme vulnerability caused by their age and circumstances and abused them cynically, mercilessly, evilly."

== See also ==
- Fritzl case
- Sheffield incest case
