= Mongillo =

Mongillo is a surname of Italian origin, a variant of Mongelli, a patronymic surname from the personal name Moncio, meaning "little monk". Notable people with the surname include:

- Aviva Mongillo (born 1998), Canadian singer and actress
- Casey Mongillo (born 1987), American voice actor
- Michael Mongillo (fl. 1997–present), American film director, screenwriter and producer
