= 3096 Days =

2013 film

- Film poster
- German: 3096 Tage
- Directed by: Sherry Hormann
- Written by: Bernd Eichinger; Martin Moszkowicz; Ruth Toma
- Starring: Antonia Campbell-Hughes; Thure Lindhardt
- Cinematography: Michael Ballhaus
- Music by: Martin Todsharow
- Production company: Constantin Film
- Distributed by: Midget Entertainment
- Release date: 28 February 2013
- Running time: 111 minutes
- Country: Germany
- Language: English

3096 Days (German: 3096 Tage) is a 2013 German drama film directed by Sherry Hormann. The film is based on the true story of Natascha Kampusch, a 10-year-old girl and her eight-year ordeal being kidnapped by Wolfgang Přiklopil. Northern Irish actress Antonia Campbell-Hughes portrays Kampusch, while Thure Lindhardt plays Přiklopil.

The film was writer Bernd Eichinger's last film before his sudden death, and Martin Moszkowicz, head of TV and Film at Constantin Film, and Ruth Toma (Gloomy Sunday) took over. It was also cinematographer Michael Ballhaus's final film.

== Plot ==
On the morning of 2 March 1998, 10-year-old Natascha Kampusch walks to school alone and angry after her mother slaps her during an argument. On the way, she is dragged into a van and later wakes up in a cellar. Her captor is 35-year-old technician Wolfgang Přiklopil. Although he is controlling and abusive toward Natascha, he appears socially isolated in public, with his main regular contact being his mother, who occasionally visits and brings him meals. Witness reports about the van lead police to question Wolfgang, but they find nothing suspicious.

For the next four years, Natascha is forbidden from leaving the cellar. Malnourishment, boredom, despair and Wolfgang's incessant psychological manipulation eventually discourage her from attempting to escape. Only when Natascha begins menstruating, she was allowed to leave the cellar and shower, and from then on, she is allowed to be out more often. When Wolfgang's mother is pleasantly surprised to find a girl's hair on his sweater, he shaves Natascha to avoid raising further suspicion. On Christmas Day of 2003, Natascha is renamed "Vivi" by Wolfgang, who also reveals his name for the first time. Meanwhile, Natascha's mother is still guilt-ridden for having allowed Natascha to walk to school alone.

Wolfgang begins building a new bedroom and forces Natascha to do heavy work, half-naked, despite her physical condition. Natascha's abuse also becomes sexual, with Wolfgang handcuffing them both with cable tie every time he rapes her. Although Natascha remains obedient, the abuse intensifies. On one occasion, she panics and punches Wolfgang in the face after he pretends to leave her to die in a pit for his amusement. Confident in his control over her, Wolfgang later takes her to a hardware store. Natascha briefly considers asking for help to a storekeeper but ultimately remains silent due to Wolfgang's prolonged psychological manipulation.

Through a radio report, Natascha learns that six years have passed since her disappearance and that the public remains unaware of her whereabouts. While speaking with her in the finished bedroom, Wolfgang reveals that he did not choose her at random, but became fixated on her after seeing her at a store and spent months constructing the cellar and planning the abduction. After another sexual assault, Natascha attempts to commit suicide by starting a fire in the cellar, but the smoke forces her to extinguish it. When Wolfgang notices the smell, he responds with violence after realizing what she has attempted. Determined to escape, Natascha begins documenting each instance of abuse on toilet paper.

Natascha anticipates Wolfgang's upcoming ski trip as a potential opportunity to seek help. Under constant supervision, her only chance arises when Wolfgang allows her to go to a public bathroom, but the only other woman there does not speak her language. Wolfgang notices the interaction and later responds with physical violence at home.

Soon after her 18th birthday, Wolfgang plans to sell his van and asks Natascha to vacuum it. While he attends a phone call, she escapes through the half-open gate entrance and asks a neighbor for help. Police inform Natascha that Wolfgang, knowing that he will be arrested at any moment, has committed suicide by lying down on a railway. Natascha is reunited with her parents, who hug her in tears of joy.

== Cast ==
- Antonia Campbell-Hughes as Natascha Kampusch
  - Amelia Pidgeon as Young Natascha
- Thure Lindhardt as Wolfgang Přiklopil
- Trine Dyrholm as Brigitta Sirny
- Vlasto Peyitch as Journalist

== Production ==
In late 2012, concerns arose about Campbell-Hughes' drastic weight loss for the film, but she stated in an interview in the Evening Standard that she wanted "to suffer as much as she – Kampusch – did". She also noted that she received a torn Achilles tendon, a broken toe, a fractured rib, and various cuts and bruises, due to the film set being similar to the dungeon in which Kampusch was placed.

== See also ==
- The Disappearance of Madeleine McCann
