= Goler clan =

Canadian family accused of incest

The Golers are a clan of poor, rural families in Canada, on Nova Scotia's South Mountain, near Wolfville, known for inter-generational poverty and the conviction in the 1980s of many family members for sexual abuse and incest.

== Background ==
The Goler family lived together in two shacks in a remote wooded area on South Mountain, located south of the community of White Rock, outside the town of Wolfville. Their ancestors occupied the area since at least the mid-1800s and, according to a sociologist at Acadia University, showed incest in the family dating back to the 1860s. Charles and Stella Goler, the matriarch and patriarch of the family, lived together with their five sons and grandchildren in a dilapidated shack.

Like most other mountain clans, they were isolated from most of the residents of the farming district in the Annapolis Valley and most of the nearby towns. The adults of the family, some of whom had intellectual disabilities, had little schooling and rarely worked. One sibling, Cecil (1939–1991), was non-verbal and born paralyzed from the neck down. The Golers supported themselves on a combination of social welfare and occasional labor at the many nearby farms, supplemented by fishing and foraging for berries and other fruits. The children performed chores, such as preparing food or removing trash.

From about 1980, several of the children had attempted to tell outsiders and authorities about the abuse they suffered, but they were disbelieved and returned to their family, who punished them. In 1984, one of the children, a 14-year-old girl, revealed the details of a long history of torture and abuse (physical, sexual, and psychological) to a school official. As the case was investigated, authorities learned that a number of Goler children were victims of sexual abuse at the hands of fathers, mothers, uncles, aunts, sisters, brothers, cousins, and one another. During interrogation by police, several of the adults openly admitted to, and even boasted about, engaging in many forms of sexual activity, up to and including rape, with the children many times. They often went into graphic detail, claiming that the children themselves had initiated the activity.

== Trial and aftermath ==
Eventually, fifteen men and one woman were charged with hundreds of allegations of incest and sexual abuse of children as young as five. Given the detailed confessions by the accused, authorities did not anticipate a trial. However, the accused eventually recanted their confessions and denied any wrongdoing. The case garnered significant attention in the media. The legal system of Kings County was strained by the Goler case. There was only one full-time prosecutor, who normally handled one or two rape cases per year alongside a relatively small number of assaults, thefts, disorderly conduct, and other crimes.

Thirteen of the accused received jail sentences of one to seven years, with William Dennis Goler receiving seven years imprisonment and his nephew, William James Goler, receiving 4.5 years, Wanda, William Dennis Goler's wife, receiving 4 years, and the rest receiving 1-3 years.

The event brought to greater attention the inadequate living conditions of many poorer Kings County residents, not only on North Mountain and South Mountain where some 4,000 poor people lived, but in the rich farmlands around Kentville where tar paper shacks blighted the landscape. These communities had been shunned by society, forcing them to look inward for support. Authorities had largely ignored them for a century or more, despite documents dating to the 1860s that showed the prevalence of intrafamilial relationships through high rates of birth defects and intellectual disabilities, although the county's low-income housing society had been working to build 565-square-foot 'hearth homes'.

Due to the sensational nature of the crimes, the trial received extensive national coverage. A book entitled On South Mountain: The Dark Secrets of the Goler Clan was written and published in 1998, covering their story in detail. Donna Goler, one of the abused children who was removed from the Goler household when she was 11, has become an outspoken activist for stricter child abuse laws and stronger protection of children from convicted child molesters. Donna's testimony was described by both the prosecutor and defense attorneys as the most important evidence presented at trial. A year after the book On South Mountain was published, she began a long fight to revise the Criminal Code, saying that it failed to protect the young relatives of convicted child molesters.

== See also ==
- Colt clan incest case
- Moe incest case
