= Verna L. Clayton =

American politician (1937–2024)

Mayor of Buffalo Grove
- In office 1979–1991

Village Clerk of Buffalo Grove
- In office 1971–1979

Village Collector of Buffalo Grove
- In office 1972–1978

Member of the Illinois House of Representatives from the 51st district
- In office 1992–1998

Personal details
- Born: February 28, 1937 Hamden, Ohio, U.S.
- Died: October 8, 2024 (aged 87) Anderson, Indiana, U.S.
- Party: Republican
- Spouse: Frank
- Children: 2 Children
- Education: Oklahoma State University, Harper College, University of Illinois

Verna L. Clayton (February 28, 1937 – October 8, 2024) was an American politician.

== Life and career ==
Born in Hamden, Ohio, Clayton went to Oklahoma State University, Harper College, and University of Illinois. She served as the clerk for Buffalo Grove, Illinois from 1971 to 1979 and then served as the mayor of Buffalo Grove from 1979 to 1991. Clayton served in the Illinois House of Representatives from 1993 to 1999 and was a Republican. Clayton died in Anderson, Indiana, on October 8, 2024, at the age of 87.
