= White Rock, Nova Scotia =

Community in Nova Scotia, Canada

Coordinates: 45°03′08″N 64°24′40″W

White Rock is a community in Kings County, Nova Scotia near the town of Wolfville.

The Stiver's Falls Hydroelectric Plant, also known as the old White Rock generating station, was built nearby in 1919 on the Gaspereau River, about 3 km south-west of Wolfville, and produced electricity for the first time on 25 February 1920. It had a capacity of 375 horsepower 280 kilowatts. The original machinery was replaced in 1950 with a 3,600 kW generating plant, and the dam replaced in 1994.

== Notable residents ==
- The Goler clan are a clan of poor, incestuous rural families in Canada, known for inter-generational poverty and the conviction in the 1980s of a large number of family members for sexual abuse and incest.
- Justin Schofield was named the top pitcher of the tournament at the Canadian senior men's softball championship in Quebec in 2015.

== Weather ==
Climate data for White Rock (1981–2010)
Month	Jan	Feb	Mar	Apr	May	Jun	Jul	Aug	Sep	Oct	Nov	Dec	Year
Record high °C (°F)	18.5 (65.3)	17.5 (63.5)	21.7 (71.1)	26.0 (78.8)	30.0 (86.0)	34.0 (93.2)	32.2 (90.0)	32.8 (91.0)	30.0 (86.0)	25.6 (78.1)	22.2 (72.0)	19.4 (66.9)	34.0 (93.2)
Mean daily maximum °C (°F)	−0.7 (30.7)	0.1 (32.2)	3.4 (38.1)	9.0 (48.2)	15.8 (60.4)	20.4 (68.7)	23.3 (73.9)	23.3 (73.9)	19.0 (66.2)	13.2 (55.8)	8.0 (46.4)	2.1 (35.8)	11.4 (52.5)
Daily mean °C (°F)	−4.3 (24.3)	−3.8 (25.2)	−0.3 (31.5)	5.1 (41.2)	11.1 (52.0)	15.5 (59.9)	18.5 (65.3)	18.6 (65.5)	14.9 (58.8)	9.6 (49.3)	4.9 (40.8)	−1.1 (30.0)	7.4 (45.3)
Mean daily minimum °C (°F)	−7.8 (18.0)	−7.6 (18.3)	−4.0 (24.8)	1.2 (34.2)	6.2 (43.2)	10.2 (50.4)	13.3 (55.9)	13.4 (56.1)	10.3 (50.5)	5.9 (42.6)	1.7 (35.1)	−4.1 (24.6)	3.2 (37.8)
Record low °C (°F)	−26.0 (−14.8)	−27.2 (−17.0)	−24.4 (−11.9)	−13.3 (8.1)	−6.1 (21.0)	−3.3 (26.1)	−1.1 (30.0)	0.0 (32.0)	−2.2 (28.0)	−8.3 (17.1)	−13.3 (8.1)	−23.9 (−11.0)	−27.2 (−17.0)
Average precipitation mm (inches)	114.4 (4.50)	85.2 (3.35)	94.3 (3.71)	94.7 (3.73)	86.4 (3.40)	74.4 (2.93)	68.7 (2.70)	68.5 (2.70)	110.3 (4.34)	120.4 (4.74)	125.3 (4.93)	112.5 (4.43)	1,155.2 (45.48)
Average rainfall mm (inches)	59.5 (2.34)	51.6 (2.03)	67.0 (2.64)	87.0 (3.43)	86.0 (3.39)	74.4 (2.93)	68.7 (2.70)	68.5 (2.70)	110.3 (4.34)	120.4 (4.74)	118.0 (4.65)	80.2 (3.16)	991.8 (39.05)
Average snowfall cm (inches)	54.9 (21.6)	33.5 (13.2)	27.3 (10.7)	7.7 (3.0)	0.4 (0.2)	0.0 (0.0)	0.0 (0.0)	0.0 (0.0)	0.0 (0.0)	0.0 (0.0)	7.3 (2.9)	31.2 (12.3)	162.4 (63.9)
Average precipitation days (≥ 0.2 mm)	13.7	10.9	11.3	11.3	11.0	11.1	8.6	8.3	10.2	11.2	13.2	12.9	133.5
Average rainy days (≥ 0.2 mm)	6.1	5.5	7.6	10.4	10.9	11.1	8.6	8.3	10.2	11.2	12.4	8.5	110.7
Average snowy days (≥ 0.2 cm)	9.2	6.4	5.0	1.7	0.05	0.0	0.0	0.0	0.0	0.0	1.4	5.2	28.9
Source: Environment Canada

== See also ==
- Goler clan
