= Fusako Sano =

Japanese kidnapping victim (born 1980)

- 佐野 房子
- Born: 28 November 1980 (age 45); Mitsuke, Niigata Prefecture, Japan
- Disappeared: 13 November 1990 (aged 9); Sanjō, Niigata Prefecture, Japan
- Status: Rescued on January 28, 2000
- Other name: Sachiko Yamada
- Known for: Victim of kidnapping

Fusako Sano (佐野 房子, Sano Fusako; also known by the pseudonym Sachiko Yamada (山田 幸子, Yamada Sachiko)) (born 28 November 1980) is a Japanese woman who was kidnapped at age nine by Nobuyuki Satō (佐藤 宣行, Satō Nobuyuki), and held in captivity for nine years and two months from 13 November 1990, to 28 January 2000. In Japan, the case is also known as the "Niigata girl confinement incident" (新潟少女監禁事件, Niigata shōjo kankin jiken).

== Abduction ==
Fusako Sano, then a fourth grade elementary school girl, disappeared on 13 November 1990, at age nine after watching a school baseball game in her home town of Sanjō, Niigata Prefecture, Japan. A large police search failed to find the missing girl. Police even considered the possibility that she had been kidnapped by North Korean intelligence operatives.

She had been kidnapped by Nobuyuki Satō (born 15 July 1962), then a 28-year-old mentally disturbed unemployed man, who forced her into his car, and subsequently held her in the upstairs floor of his apartment in a residential area of Kashiwazaki, Niigata Prefecture, for nine years and two months. The house is only 200 meters (660 ft) from a kōban (police substation), and 55 kilometers (34 mi) from the location where she was kidnapped.

== The missing years ==
Whilst Sano was initially scared, according to her own statements, she eventually just gave up and accepted her fate. Allegedly, Sato kept her tied up for several months and used a stun gun for punishments if she did not videotape horse races on television. Sano was also threatened with a knife and beatings. Her kidnapper shared his men's clothes with her and gave her food three times per day, either instant food or meals cooked by his mother, who lived downstairs in the house. He also cut Sano's hair. Since there was no bath or toilet upstairs where Sano was confined, she was only able to take a bath infrequently, when permitted by her captor.

She spent most of her time in captivity listening to the radio, and reportedly was allowed to watch TV only in the last year of her ordeal. While the door was never locked, Sano did not take a step outside for nine years. She later told the police: "I was too scared to escape and eventually lost the energy to escape."

Satō's mother lived downstairs and apparently had no contact with her son's captive since he became very violent whenever she tried to go upstairs. However, police believe the mother must have had some knowledge of Sano's presence; for example, it was alleged that she purchased feminine hygiene products for the victim.

== Discovery ==
Nobuyuki Satō's mother, then 73 years old, consulted the Kashiwazaki public health center in January 1996, because her son had been acting strangely and was violent to her. She called again on 12 January 2000, and again on 19 January requesting a visit to her home. Officials finally visited the home on Friday, 28 January 2000. Subsequently, Satō caused a disturbance that resulted in police being called to the scene. On this occasion, Sano, by then 19 years old, approached the officers and identified herself.

Upon her rescue Sano was found to be extremely thin and weak due to lack of exercise; she could barely walk. She was also dehydrated. Due to the lack of exposure to sunlight, she also had a very light skin tone and suffered from jaundice. Sano was reportedly acting like a child, and suffered from post-traumatic stress disorder.

Soon after her release, Sano was reunited with her family. Her mother did not initially recognize her, since they had last seen her at age 9.

The local newspaper Echigo Times (越後タイムス) compared the incident to the Yotsuya ghost story, based on the address of Satō.

== Aftermath ==
=== The victim ===
In the years following her release, Sano's physical health improved, and she now helps out in her family's rice paddy. As a result of her lack of normal social interactions during her captivity, she still has difficulties adjusting to normal life, has very few friends, and likes to take walks alone. She enjoys digital photography, especially of flowers, and obtained a driver's license. Neighbors comment that she is a fan of the local J. League soccer team Albirex Niigata, and goes to some of their games.

The Sano family have declined to comment on her ordeal.

In 2007, her father drowned in a pond, in her presence, when the two went out to have fun.

=== Prosecution ===
Nobuyuki Satō, then 37 years old, was hospitalized immediately on 28 January 2000, as mentally unstable. On 10 February 2000, his legal status was changed from suspect to criminal, and he was arrested on 11 February 2000.

The Niigata court opened his trial on 23 May 2000. In the proceedings, the prosecutors acted very carefully to avoid further damage to Sano's mental health. The prosecution's case included even minor charges against Satō (for example, shoplifting of women's underwear) with the goal of putting him in jail for as long as possible. Following a defense claim of criminal insanity, on 6 September 2001, psychiatrists found Satō to be mentally fit to face the charges, and he subsequently admitted the main charges. In the first instance, on 22 January 2002, the Niigata District court sentenced him to 14 years out of a maximum of 15 years.

The defense appealed on 24 January 2002, and the trial moved to the Tokyo High Court. On October 12, 2002, the Tokyo High Court judge Toshio Yamada (山田 利夫, Yamada Toshio) sentenced Satō to 11 years, reducing the initial sentence. Both the prosecution and the defense appealed on 24 December 2002, and the case moved to the Supreme Court of Japan on December 10, 2002. On July 10, 2003, the Supreme Court judge Takehisa Fukazawa accepted the prosecution's arguments, with the result that Satō was serving a 14-year prison sentence. Sato served his sentence at Chiba Prison until his release in April 2015. Around 2017, Sato was found dead, alone in an apartment in Chiba City. He was in his mid-50s at the time.

== Criticism of the police ==
After the discovery and rescue of Sano, the police in Japan were heavily criticized. Satō was already known to police for inflicting violence against another girl on 13 June 1989, for which he was convicted on September 19, 1989. However, his name somehow disappeared from the list of criminals, and he was not considered a suspect in the abduction of Sano in 1990. At the time of Sano's rescue, Niigata Prefectural Police chief, Koji Kobayashi, did not show up to the police station to supervise the situation, but spent his evening playing mah-jong with the head of the Regional Police Bureaus. Due to this, and subsequent errors by the police, Kobayashi resigned on February 26, 2000, and the head of the Regional Police Bureaus resigned on 29 February 2000.

== See also ==
- Child abduction
- List of people who disappeared mysteriously: post-1970
- List of kidnappings
- List of long-term false imprisonment cases
