= Gramastetten =

- Municipality
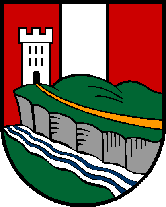
- Coat of arms

- Location within Austria
- Coordinates: 48°22′52″N 14°11′24″E
- Country: Austria
- State: Upper Austria
- District: Urfahr-Umgebung

Government
  - Mayor: Mag. Andreas Fazeni (ÖVP)

Area
  - Total: 40.2 km^{2} (15.5 sq mi)
- Elevation: 545 m (1,788 ft)

Population (2018-01-01)
  - Total: 5,102
  - Density: 127/km^{2} (329/sq mi)
- Time zone: UTC+1 (CET)
  - Summer (DST): UTC+2 (CEST)
- Postal code: 4201
- Area code: 0 72 39
- Vehicle registration: UU
- Website: Official website

Gramastetten is a municipality in the Austrian state of Upper Austria in the district of Urfahr-Umgebung in the upper Mühlviertel.

== Population ==
Historical population
Year	Pop.	±%
1991	4,201	—
2001	4,524	+7.7%
2009	4,652	+2.8%
2018	5,102	+9.7%
2019	5,136	+0.7%

== Tourism ==
=== Health resort Gramastetten ===
Near the state capital Linz you can find relaxation and impressive nature. The idyllic Rodlbad is a very popular nature styled bath. It is situated in a forest clearing with a playground, paddling pool and a pleasant buffet. The buffet offers frequently a barbecue with an impressive atmosphere.

== See also ==
- Linz sisters
