= Mongelli case =

Sexual abuse case in Italy

Michele Mongelli (born 1945) is a man from Turin, Italy, who was arrested on 27 March 2009 for allegedly sexually abusing his daughter over 25 years. His son Giuseppe (born 1968) was also arrested on the allegation of abusing his sister and his own four daughters. Because of the similarities, this case has been compared to the Fritzl case in Austria and the Sheffield incest case in Britain.

The 34-year-old daughter was given the pseudonym of Laura by the Italian press and other media. The victims had been kept in conditions of slavery and mistreatment.

In May 2012 Michele Mongelli was sentenced to 10 years of prison, and his son Giuseppe sentenced to 9 years.

== See also ==
- List of long-term false imprisonment cases
