= Kidwelly sex cult =

Group of Welsh child rapists, caught in 2010

The Kidwelly sex cult was a British cult that operated in Kidwelly, Wales, that raped children for decades until its perpetrators were arrested in 2010. Known by its members as simply "The Church", its leader Colin Batley psychologically terrorised and coerced vulnerable children into performing sexual acts, by using death threats and brainwashing. Batley, three female members, and a second man were convicted of child sex offences in 2011 and jailed.

== Cult ==
The cult sexually exploited vulnerable teenagers, using occult practices and literature as a means of justifying its abuse, and of brainwashing its victims. It was led by Colin Batley and his wife, as well as three other women. Its sexual abuse against children spanned several decades, and was carried out first in London, then in Kidwelly in southwest Wales.

The five members who went on trial departed from London for a single Kidwelly street in the 1990s. The leader, Colin Batley, moved first, followed by Shelly Millar, Batley's mistress, Jacqueline Marling, and their partners. Batley and three of the four female defendants were convicted of sexual offences. Colin Batley and the four female defendants indicated their membership with an ancient "Egyptian eye" tattoo of Horus, a hawk-headed god on their arms, and by collecting ancient Egyptian religious objects.

The cult targeted troubled, impressionable minors, forcing them to undergo an initiation ceremony that ended with child rape by an adult. Children were intimidated into participating with threats of murder. One girl testified that after this ceremony (which started with Batley preaching about the occult and finished with sex), she was regularly coerced into having sex with Colin Batley at his house, and with strangers at satanic orgies. In tears, she testified, "I did it because I was told to by Colin". A victim explained, "Colin knew how to manipulate you, to make you believe anything he said". Children also obeyed his demands for sex out of "fear of angering the Gods." Batley had Rottweiler dogs that were "vicious to everyone".

The sexual abuse was often preceded with satanic ceremonies in which passages from the occultist Aleister Crowley's books The Book of the Law, The Book of Magick, and Equinox of the Gods were read out. One ceremony featured an altar with salted bread, a chalice of red wine, and an incense burner. At the end of these satanic ceremonies, members "became skyclad", or disrobed, and had sex.

A neighbour, John Wheatland, claimed that while working in his garden, he once saw a girl in her early teens "done up to look like a film star", who asked him whether he wanted sex. He also stated that he heard a victim crying every night.

=== The Book of the Law ===
Aleister Crowley, whose literature was a major source of the cult's beliefs, was an occultist and magician who died in 1947. He wrote The Book of the Law in Cairo in 1904. Each member's home seemed to have a laminated version of it. The trial heard this book had "worrying trends and themes" about sex, including the statements "Let all chaste women be despised," "Sex with anyone is not just permissible, but to be encouraged. Prostitution is to be admired," and "Some of the most passionate and permanent attachments have begun with rape. Rome was founded thereon." Judge Paul Thomas QC admonished the book as "a ludicrous document".

=== Death of Damian Batley ===
Colin Batley's son Damian died on 1 February 2008, when he accidentally hanged himself during a sex act. He filmed the fatal accident on his mobile phone. An inquest was told he was found naked and hanging.

A neighbour said Damian's father was "laughing and joking like he didn’t have a care in the world" on the day of the funeral, which "no normal person could comprehend".

=== Similarity with other cults ===
According to the Cult Information Centre's general secretary Ian Haworth, the Kidwelly rape cult had the characteristics that are typical of a cult, which he had "heard year after year in the 32 years I've worked full time in this field". He estimated the UK has 500 to 1,000 cults, with these operating "in major cities", as well as "in quiet, rural areas". Haworth added that cult leaders often break people down, sometimes within three or four days, with methods including depriving them of food and sleep. He said this "seems to work best on people with very healthy minds".

== Victims ==
Five victims testified in court that they were lured or brought to cult members' homes where they were sexually abused, and that there were more victims who had not reported any of their abuse.

One 15-year-old girl who gave evidence described being shared like a "sex toy" between cult members. A second girl was raped by Batley when she was only 11 years old, and testified, "Sex with him was a test, and if I did not pass, I would go to The Abyss." A third girl also testified to being raped by Batley when she was 11 or 12, and being coerced into having sex on camera when she was 16.

Victims said the cult's abuse "has been a nightmare journey for each and every one of us".

=== Annabelle Forest ===
Annabelle Forest (a pseudonym), a daughter of cult member Jacqueline Marling, gave testimony which helped convict five abusers. She was forced at the age of seven to watch a sex act by her mother Jacqueline Marling on Colin Batley. When Forest was 11, Colin Batley raped her. In her early teens, she was coerced into group sex with Marling (her own mother), which became something Forest was regularly forced to participate in. She was also coerced into a relationship with a second older male. Forest said "I was a schoolgirl by day and a sex slave at night," which "got so bad that at one point I tried to take my own life." Three months after giving birth to a child of Batley, aged 18, Forest was forced into prostitution, having sex with an estimated 1,800 men, with her entire earnings being taken by the cult. She said that during her many years of being abused and exploited: "Too many people looked away, too many people ignored the signs. It astonishes me that we lived in that small cul-de-sac for so many years and not one person saw anything that gave them cause for concern."

Forest detailed her experiences in her book The Devil on the Doorstep: My Escape From a Satanic Sex Cult, which she wrote to "get others to start really paying attention to the community they live in", because "there are abused children everywhere".

== Investigation ==
In 2010, two adult victims, one male and one female, reported the cult's abuse to the police prompting the group's arrest the same year.

Chief Inspector Richard Lewis said the investigation by Dyfed–Powys Police "was a very protracted and complicated inquiry involving a very secretive group" that perpetrated "systematic and prolonged abuse of children" who "showed great courage" by reporting it. Mark Bergmanski, Detective Chief Inspector, agreed "it was a very complicated and complex inquiry".

The safeguarding children's board at Carmarthenshire County Council lambasted all perpetrators of "systematic, secretive and prolonged sexual abuse of children".

== Sentences ==
The cult's leader, Colin Batley, three female members, and a second man received prison sentences totalling 36 years, with the possibility of Colin Batley remaining in prison for life. They were found guilty on 47 charges including rape and other sexual crimes against children after a five-week trial in February and March of 2011. A fourth female member was acquitted after facing a single charge of child indecency.

The head of the Welsh complex case unit in the Crown Prosecution Service said, "all of those sentenced today are guilty of horrific crimes and therefore it is also right that they have received lengthy sentences."

The jury deliberated for four full days, and two half days, and were offered counseling, due to the distressing nature of the offences. The defendants had denied the cult's existence for the entire trial.

Perpetrator	Age	Conviction(s)	Sentence
Colin Batley (leader)	48	Rape (11 counts), indecent assault (three counts), pimping, causing a minor to have sex, buggery (six counts), possessing indecent photographs of an underage girl (12 counts).	Indeterminate – min. 11 years
Jacqueline Marling ("second-in-command")	42	Aiding and abetting rape, organising prostitution for profit, persuading a child to participate in sexual activity, indecency with a child (three counts)	12 years
Elaine Batley (leader's wife)	47	Indecency with a child (three counts), sex acts with a child	8 years
Shelly Millar (leader's "sex slave")	35	Indecent activity with a child, persuading a child to participate in sexual activity	5 years
Vincent Barden	70	Sexual assault against an underage girl (two counts)	3 years

== See also ==
- Birmingham bathing cult
- List of satanic ritual abuse allegations
