= Álvarez incest case =

Incest case in Mariquita, Colombia

The Álvarez incest case was uncovered late March 2009 when 59-year-old Arcedio Álvarez was arrested in Mariquita, Colombia, accused of imprisoning and sexually abusing his daughter Alba Nidia Álvarez over a period of 25 years, beginning from when she was nine years old. The rapes resulted in her giving birth to 14 children, six of whom died due to lack of medical care.

== Perpetrator ==
Arcedio Álvarez Quintero (1950–2011) was a convicted child molester and sex offender from Mariquita, Colombia. He grew up farming with his family, becoming a farmer himself as an adult.

In 2009, Álvarez was prosecuted for molesting and abusing his biological daughter for years, resulting in 14 children, six of whom died due to malnutrition and lack of proper care. Álvarez claimed that his crimes were part of "God's plan" and furthermore denied any biological relationship to the victim, but this was later disproved by DNA testing. Álvarez became known as "the Monster of Mariquita" and "the Colombian Fritzl", after infamous Austrian murderer, rapist, and child molester Josef Fritzl.

== Crime ==
After the death of Álvarez's wife, he began to abuse his young daughter Nidia. The rapes are believed to have started when she was about seven years old, and continued for roughly 26 years, resulting in 14 pregnancies, the first when Nidia was just 13 years old. Of the 14 children to come from this abuse, six died due to denial of medical care by Álvarez. Álvarez never allowed his daughter to leave their home unsupervised and would often tell her that their relationship was simply "God's will". As the children grew, Álvarez allegedly began to assault his young daughters and may have been grooming his sons to do the same.

== Victims ==
Arcedio Álvarez's victims included his daughter Alba Nidia, 35 at the time of the trial, and her children by him who were also his grandchildren. Alba Nidia grew up poor in their small home in rural central Colombia. Álvarez reportedly taught her to read and write, but neither she nor her children were allowed to attend school. All her children were born at home, and six of them died in childhood when Álvarez refused to take them to the hospital. Of the eight surviving children (five girls and three boys), the oldest was 19 years old at the time of the trial, and the youngest was only a few months old.

== Investigation ==
Arcedio Álvarez was arrested in March 2009, after Alba Nidia left town with her six youngest children. The two eldest children had wanted to stay. She then acknowledged to a child welfare worker the sexual abuse she had endured for almost 30 years. Local councilwoman Gilma Jiménez made public the extreme conditions in which Alba and her children were living with her father and how poor their health was. The investigation later revealed that many in the rural area where they lived knew of the suspicious things occurring and had not said anything about it.

When the case first came to light, Álvarez repeatedly claimed that Alba Nidia was adopted. However, several lab tests proved that Alba Nidia was Álvarez's biological daughter. He also claimed that he and Alba Nidia had a consensual, loving romantic relationship.

During the investigation, Álvarez needed police protection when attending his court dates due to the hatred the community felt toward him.

Álvarez was found guilty of crimes against his daughter and their children. In October 2009, he was sentenced to a minimum of 15 years in prison, but died in prison in September 2011, having served a little under 2 years of his sentence.

== See also ==
- Inbreeding
- Incest
- List of long-term false imprisonment cases
