= Stefanie Marsh =

British journalist and writer

Stefanie Marsh is a British journalist, author and a senior features writer at The Times. She has been a correspondent in Palestine for The Times, and was one of the first English-speaking reporters to cover the Fritzl case in 2008.

In 2006, Marsh was nominated as feature writer of the year at the British Press Awards for her reports from Mount Everest.

== Publications ==
- Stefanie Marsh and Bojan Pancevski, The Crimes of Josef Fritzl, Harper Element, 2009, ISBN 0-00-730055-7
