= Hamden, Ohio =

- Village
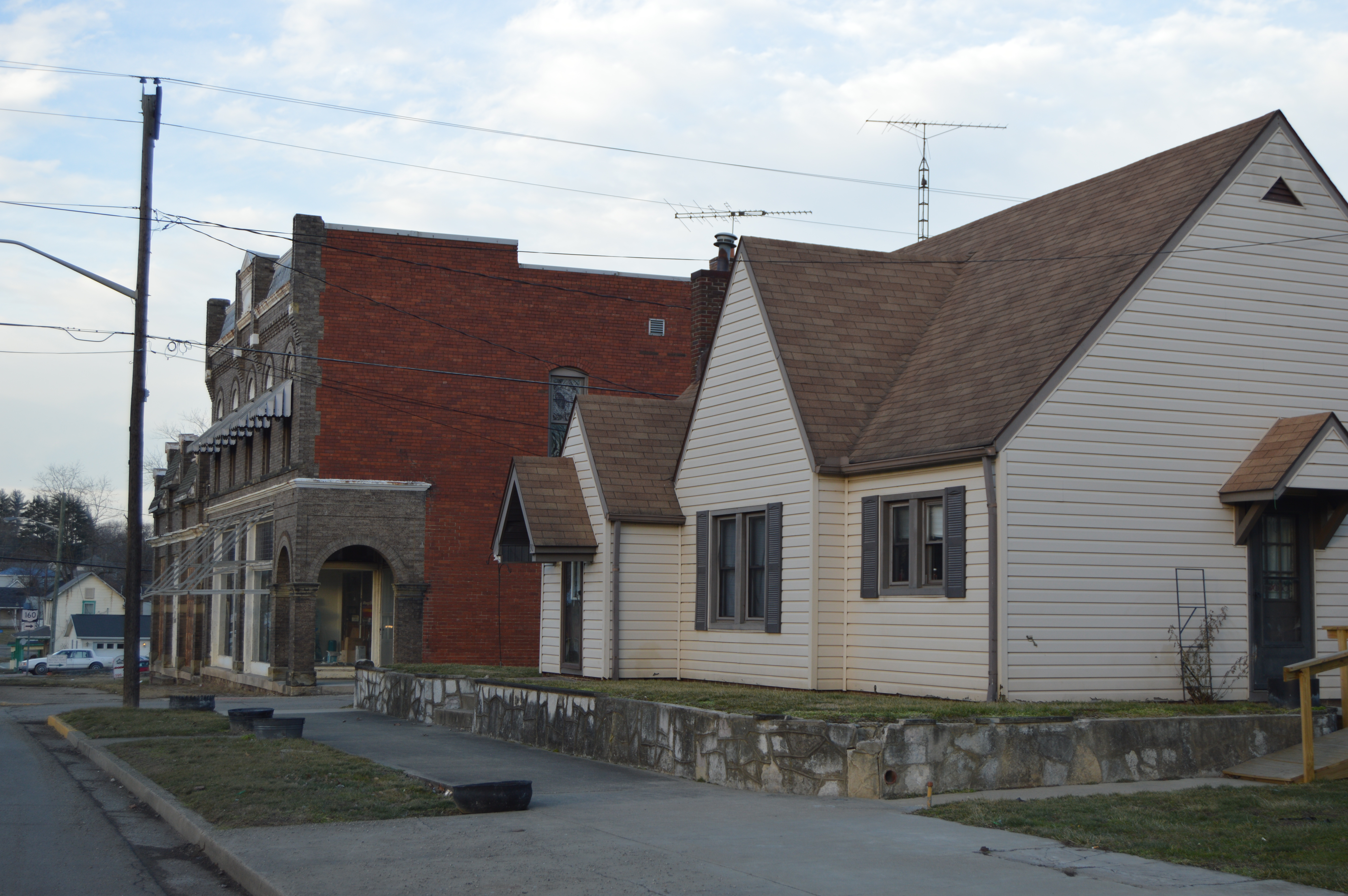
- South Main Street

- Location in Vinton County and the state of Ohio.

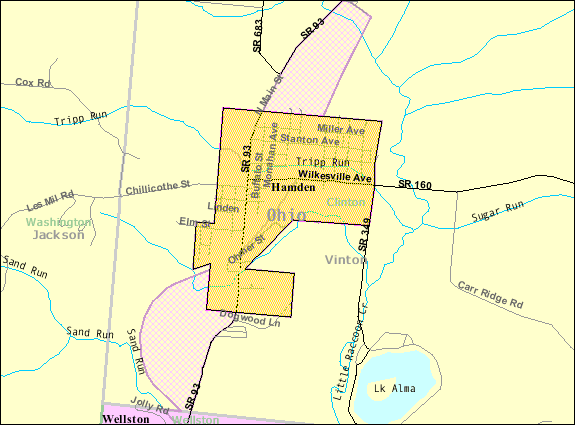
- Detailed map of Hamden
- Coordinates: 39°09′39″N 82°31′27″W
- Country: United States
- State: Ohio
- County: Vinton
- Township: Clinton
- Established: 1820
- Incorporated: 1876

Area
  - Total: 0.55 sq mi (1.43 km^{2})
  - Land: 0.55 sq mi (1.42 km^{2})
  - Water: 0 sq mi (0.00 km^{2})
- Elevation: 712 ft (217 m)

Population (2020)
  - Total: 727
  - Estimate (2023): 714
  - Density: 1,323.1/sq mi (510.87/km^{2})
- Time zone: UTC-5 (Eastern (EST))
  - Summer (DST): UTC-4 (EDT)
- ZIP code: 45634
- Area code: 740
- FIPS code: 39-32956
- GNIS feature ID: 2398228
- Website: https://www.hamdenohio.com/

Hamden is a village in Vinton County, Ohio, United States. The population was 727 at the 2020 census.

== History ==
Hamden was laid out in 1820. It was incorporated as a village in 1876.

=== Recent history ===
On June 30, 2026, 16 children were rescued from a home in Hamden, 7 of whom were hospitalized, after they were found in deplorable conditions, and 4 adults were arrested for child endangerment.

== Geography ==
According to the United States Census Bureau, the village has a total area of 0.57 square miles (1.48 km^{2}), all land.

== Demographics ==
Historical population
Census	Pop.	Note	%±
1870	364		—
1880	520		42.9%
1890	622		19.6%
1900	838		34.7%
1910	1,019		21.6%
1920	837		−17.9%
1930	883		5.5%
1940	924		4.6%
1950	951		2.9%
1960	1,035		8.8%
1970	953		−7.9%
1980	1,010		6.0%
1990	877		−13.2%
2000	871		−0.7%
2010	879		0.9%
2020	727		−17.3%
2023 (est.)	714	▼	−1.8%
U.S. Decennial Census

=== 2010 census ===
As of the census of 2010, there were 879 people, 338 households, and 230 families living in the village. The population density was 1,542.1 inhabitants per square mile (595.4/km^{2}). There were 367 housing units at an average density of 643.9 per square mile (248.6/km^{2}). The racial makeup of the village was 99.3% White, 0.5% African American, 0.1% Native American, and 0.1% Asian. Hispanic or Latino of any race were 0.7% of the population.

There were 338 households, of which 33.4% had children under the age of 18 living with them, 48.8% were married couples living together, 14.5% had a female householder with no husband present, 4.7% had a male householder with no wife present, and 32.0% were non-families. 27.5% of all households were made up of individuals, and 12.5% had someone living alone who was 65 years of age or older. The average household size was 2.60 and the average family size was 3.12.

The median age in the village was 35.5 years. 26.4% of residents were under the age of 18; 8.2% were between the ages of 18 and 24; 27.7% were from 25 to 44; 23.4% were from 45 to 64; and 14.3% were 65 years of age or older. The gender makeup of the village was 49.1% male and 50.9% female.

=== 2000 census ===
As of the census of 2000, there were 871 people, 344 households, and 255 families living in the village. The population density was 1,528.0 inhabitants per square mile (590.0/km^{2}). There were 375 housing units at an average density of 657.9 per square mile (254.0/km^{2}). The racial makeup of the village was 97.13% White, 1.49% Native American, 0.34% from other races, and 1.03% from two or more races. Hispanic or Latino of any race were 0.80% of the population.

There were 344 households, out of which 29.7% had children under the age of 18 living with them, 57.8% were married couples living together, 11.9% had a female householder with no husband present, and 25.6% were non-families. 22.1% of all households were made up of individuals, and 11.6% had someone living alone who was 65 years of age or older. The average household size was 2.53 and the average family size was 2.92.

In the village, the population was spread out, with 24.5% under the age of 18, 9.1% from 18 to 24, 26.2% from 25 to 44, 23.8% from 45 to 64, and 16.5% who were 65 years of age or older. The median age was 38 years. For every 100 females there were 91.4 males. For every 100 females age 18 and over, there were 84.3 males.

The median income for a household in the village was $27,625, and the median income for a family was $32,083. Males had a median income of $30,250 versus $18,929 for females. The per capita income for the village was $13,242. About 13.5% of families and 18.9% of the population were below the poverty line, including 27.1% of those under age 18 and 12.4% of those age 65 or over.

== Notable people ==
- Homer E. Abele, lawyer and congressman
- Verna L. Clayton, Illinois state representative
- Jerry Harrington, baseball player

== See also ==
- Siders case
