= Birmingham bathing cult =

Cult based in Birmingham, England

The Birmingham bathing cult was a cult based in Birmingham, England, that committed serious sexual offences against children for over 20 years. Its leader Michael Oluronbi gave children "holy baths" as cover for the abuse and was jailed for 34 years.

== Cult ==
Michael Oluronbi, born in Nigeria, led a splinter group of the Cherubim and Seraphim Church at a house in Birmingham, England, from 1989. It had approximately 40 members. He branded himself as a prophet and according to police "had such a hold over the congregation that anything he said was taken as read". Several members who were sexually abused by Oluronbi called their group "a cult" with a "controlling" leader.

== Crimes ==
Michael Oluronbi sexually abused children for over 20 years starting in 1989, in Birmingham and London. His known victims were six girls and a boy, some of whom he continued abusing as adults. His youngest victim was aged eight. Police believe there may be other victims.

He perpetrated the crimes while giving the children "spiritual baths" in an upstairs bathroom, sometimes with the assistance of his wife. The victims were either naked or wearing only a red sash. The abuse included forcing children to drink perfume, sexual assault during a bath and rape afterwards. He perpetrated rape at least 88 times. He controlled his young victims with frightening beliefs, such as threats that a child would become a witch or fail school exams if they resisted his abuse. He rationalised his crimes as God's instructions and as cleansing rituals to protect against evil spirits. According to the Crown Prosecution Service, because of the "influence and authority the defendants held" victims "honestly believed their actions were on God's behalf".

When eventually confronted by a victim's relative, he blamed the Devil for forcing him to commit the crimes. He described himself as "an animal" and said "everything was my fault".

=== Concealment ===
When the abuse caused four girls to become pregnant, their pregnancies were forcibly terminated, either by booking the girls into abortion clinics under false names or with a drug administered by Oluronbi. As a qualified pharmacist, Oluronbi was able to access abortifacient medicines himself. Three victims were given multiple abortions, with one receiving "five or six" abortions when she was still in secondary school. Oluronbi's wife, Juliana, arranged some of the abortions.

=== Impact on victims ===
Police described the impact on their victims, both physically and mentally as "massive". One victim said the "terrible" crimes "affected everyone's lives". A victim said Oluronbi took "my innocence, my youth and my purity as a child", while another "used to eat soap until I was physically sick so I could get rid of this man's mark on me inside and out". The abuse caused a girl to "question if my life was worth living".

The NSPCC said "behind the facade of trust and respect, Michael Oluronbi used fear and manipulation to subject children to unthinkable abuse" and his wife Juliana "contributed to the trauma inflicted on these children."

=== Arrest ===
The Oluronbis were eventually caught after a victim reported the crimes to police. In May 2018, Michael Oluronbi was arrested at Birmingham Airport when attempting to flee to his native Nigeria, shortly after a victim confronted him. Police said he had been continuing to work as a pastor until then.

== Trial ==
Michael Oluronbi faced 32 charges, all of which he denied. He and his wife went on trial for nine weeks, ending in January 2020, and he was convicted on 24 charges, with the jury unable to decide on a further six.

=== Media restrictions ===
During the trial, the media was prohibited from reporting on the court proceedings or on the crimes. These could only be reported after the judge lifted the legal restrictions on 14 January 2020, when the Crown Prosecution Service announced it would not seek a retrial.

=== Convictions ===
On 10 January 2020, the two defendants were each convicted of multiple child sexual offences. Michael Oluronbi's 24 convictions included 15 counts of rape. All three of his wife's convictions were for "aiding and abetting rape" by organising concealment abortions. Georgina Hewins of the Crown Prosecution Service said: "This case involved the serious and sustained sexual abuse of vulnerable young children by a religious leader. The young age of the victims greatly increases the seriousness of the offences." She praised the victims' "great courage" which enabled the abusers' "despicable and lawless behaviour" to be known.

Detective Inspector Dave Sproson of West Midlands Police said: "These were sickening crimes committed against children who had put their trust in Oluronbi and looked up to him. I hope his conviction offers some closure to the victims and I would like to thank them for their bravery throughout the trial."

=== Sentences ===
Perpetrator	Age	Convictions	Sentence
Michael Oluronbi (leader)	60	Rape (15 counts), sexual assault (2 counts), indecent assault (7 counts)	34 years
Juliana Oluronbi (leader's wife)	58	Aiding a rape of a child (2 counts), aiding a rape of an adult	11 years

On 6 March 2020, Michael Oluronbi and his wife Juliana were jailed for 34 years and 11 years respectively. Judge Sarah Buckingham called Oluronbi "arrogant, selfish, and vain." Sentencing, she said: "The children feared you and this enabled you to continue your grip. Your offending has had an extreme and severe impact on all of your complainants [...] In my judgment, your offending must be one of the worst cases of sexual abuse of multiple children to come before the courts."

== See also ==
- Kidwelly sex cult
