= Lydia Gouardo =

French woman (born 1962)

- Born: 13 November 1962 (age 63); Maisons-Alfort, Val-de-Marne
- Known for: Being imprisoned, raped and tortured by her stepfather
- Parents: Raymond Gouardo (stepfather) (father); Lucienne Gouardo (stepmother) (mother)

Lydia Gouardo (born 13 November 1962) is a French woman, born in Maisons-Alfort, Val-de-Marne, who was imprisoned for 28 years, raped, and tortured by her stepfather, Raymond Gouardo, in their home in Meaux and Coulommes in Seine et Marne. The abuse took place from 1971 to 1999.

== Background and disappearance ==
Lydia gave birth to six children, all by her stepfather, who was born in Paris on 24 May 1937. During her imprisonment, she escaped and phoned legal aid, but her stepfather recaptured her in a family residence in Melun. She was finally freed on 20 November 1999 when her stepfather died. The abuse started when she was eight years old.

Lydia claimed to have run away from her stepfather when he hit her too hard but was always brought back by the police when she was a minor. She claimed to have not realized that the abuse was unusual. She bears the scars of her torture from her neck to her ankles from where her captor burned her with boiling water and hydrochloric acid. She still lives in the same house with the attic where she was locked up in, but she does not venture up there anymore.

== Aftermath ==
She wrote a book about her story, Le silence des autres (The Silence of Others), with the French journalist and writer Jean-Michel Caradec'h in 2008. She admitted that it was the worldwide news of the Fritzl case that made her talk; she said she wanted to be friends with Elisabeth Fritzl because she would feel less alone and she could support her. Gouardo believes the world "ignored her ordeal" as an incest and abuse victim. In her book she criticises the media and authorities for neglecting her case, if it were not for the Fritzl case.

Her stepmother Lucienne was convicted in a closed-door trial for failure to report the crimes she was aware of and for sexual abuse against one of Lydia's children, and was given a three-year suspended jail sentence; however, the prosecution appealed and her sentence was increased to a four-year suspended jail sentence.

Police also suspect Raymond Gouardo in the murder of four other girls in the Paris area in 1987. Raymond's body was exhumed to extract his DNA for tests on one of the victims which have not shown any link with Gouardo and other evidence is circumstantial.

== See also ==
- List of long-term false imprisonment cases
- List of kidnappings
