= Siders case =

2026 child endangerment case in Vinton County, Ohio

- Duration: 2008–2026
- Location: Vinton County, Ohio, U.S.
- Type: Child abuse; child neglect
- Participants: 4
- Outcome: 3 charged; 1 declared unfit to stand trial (Siders Sr.)
- Arrests: 4
- Accused: Gary Lee Siders II, Elizabeth Ann Siders, Christina Lynn Siders; Gary Siders, Sr.
- Trial: Ongoing
- Verdict: Gary Siders, Sr.: Deemed incompetent to stand trial

The Siders case is an ongoing criminal investigation in Vinton County, Ohio, involving alleged prolonged child endangerment and abuse after 16 children, aged 20 months to 18 years, were removed from a home in Hamden, Ohio, on June 30, 2026.

Three adults were charged with 16 counts of endangering children: Gary Siders II, Gary Siders Sr., and Christina Siders. The fourth adult, Elizabeth Siders, faces 17 charges. The 17th charge is not yet publicly disclosed.

The Ohio attorney general’s office characterized the case as "prolonged and extreme interfamilial neglect and abuse." Investigators emphasized the case is not believed to involve human trafficking.

On August 21, 2026, Gary Siders II and Elizabeth were subsequently charged with allegations of child sexual abuse in a separate case that did not involve their own children.

== Background ==
Gary Siders II and Elizabeth married in Mason County, West Virginia in 2008, at the ages of 18 and 15 years old, respectively. Then, West Virginia state law permitted legal marriage at any age with parental consent.

Officials reported the Siders family has lived in various Ohio counties since 2008. Investigators believe the family failed to maintain medical and governmental records during this time.

On November 20, 2022, Elizabeth Siders gave birth to conjoined twins who died the same day of natural causes.

== Investigation and arrests ==
The children were discovered via two active search warrants at a residence in Hamden, Ohio on June 30, 2026. Both warrants were connected to separate investigations. One warrant was related to indecent exposure incidents perpetrated by Gary Siders II. According to authorities, Siders exposed himself to members of the public on four separate occasions: May 23rd, 27th, 29th, and 31st.

The second warrant was issued to collect Gary Siders II's DNA for an unrelated investigation opened March 2026, alleging unlawful sexual conduct in 2022 with a minor outside the immediate family. Elizabeth and Siders II have been indicted on four charges stemming from this unrelated case.

Upon executing the search warrants, 16 children were found in a 12 by 12-foot room. Investigators state they did not expect to find any children in the residence. The house was in extreme disrepair; reports state first responders nearly fell through the rotten floor while treating the children.

Initially, it was unknown whether any of the eldest Siders were the biological parents. Elizabeth Siders’s attorney confirmed she was the mother of all 16 children; she had given birth on an almost annual basis for approximately 18 years.

The Ohio Attorney General's Office announced that the 16 children were discovered in a state of severe neglect, including being covered in insects and human feces. Officials said the children were taken out of the home and immediately transported to local hospitals. Some received basic care and were later released, while others were admitted for more advanced medical treatment and remained hospitalized in serious condition. One child was allegedly intubated. Neighbors and locals claim they were unaware that any children were living in the home, and school records did not indicate any of the Siders children were enrolled in school.

== Legal proceedings ==
The children were placed in the custody of the Ohio Department of Child and Family Services after being removed from the residence. WOUB-TV reported the children were taken to medical facilities around Ohio and remained in the custody of children’s services.

On July 7, 2026, attorneys for the Siders waived preliminary hearings. Gary Siders Sr.'s attorney filed a motion seeking to reduce his client’s $300,000 bond, citing health issues and raised concerns about his competency to stand trial. The judge granted a bond modification for Gary Siders Sr., with GPS monitoring required if he were to be released from the hospital. Gary Sr. was released from custody in August 2026. Vinton County Prosecutor William Archer added that had Gary Sr. remained in custody, Vinton County would be responsible for his medical bills and this was not an expense the county could reasonably afford.

Gary II, Elizabeth, and Christina Siders each face the same 19 charges: 2 counts of second-degree felony child endangerment; 10 counts of third-degree felony child endangerment; and 7 counts of misdemeanor child endangerment.

Gary Siders Sr. faces 16 charges: 10 counts of third-degree child endangerment, and 6 misdemeanor counts of child endangerment.

On September 9, 2026, Siders Sr. was deemed incompetent to stand trial.

== Aftermath ==
As of October 2026, the 16 children, six of whom are twins aged four or younger, are in foster care in Vinton County. The rural county, the least populous in the state of Ohio, is struggling to pay for their daily expenses.
