= Fritzl case =

Captivity and abuse of Elisabeth Fritzl

Coordinates: 48°7′3.67″N 14°52′14.90″E

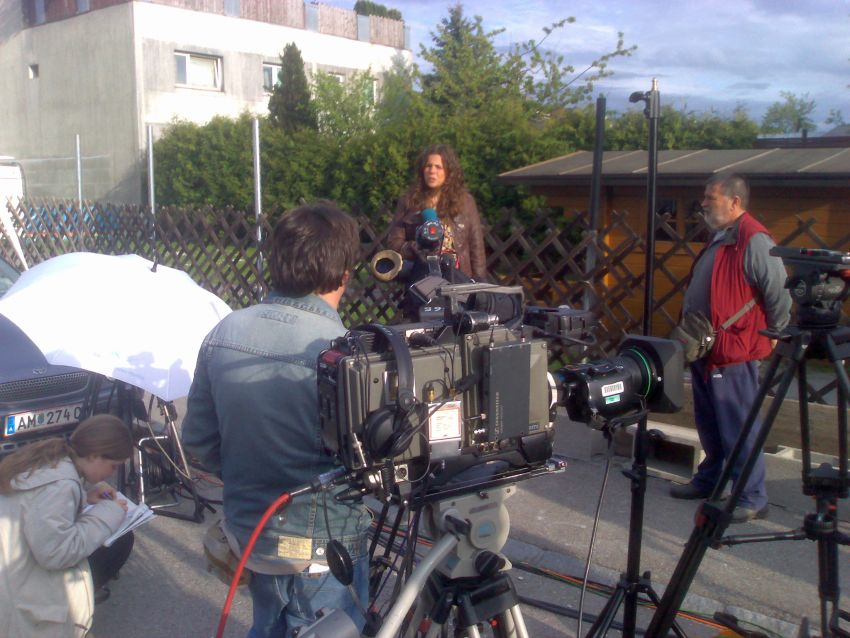
- Reporters in front of the Fritzl family home on 1 May 2008
- Location: Amstetten, Lower Austria
- Date: 28 August 1984 (Note: 1984 was when Josef's captivity of Elisabeth began. He harassed her starting in 1977.)– 26 April 2008 at 02:36 (23 years, 7 months, 4 weeks and 1 day)
- Attack type: Kidnapping, rape, child abuse, torture, slavery, child murder, filicide, infanticide
- Weapon: Various
- Deaths: 1
- Victims: Elisabeth Fritzl and her children (Note: She was impregnated after being raped by Josef)
- Perpetrator: Josef Fritzl (later Josef Mayrhoff)
- Motive: Sexual obsession and desire to control Elisabeth Fritzl
- Verdict: Pleaded guilty
- Convictions: Murder by negligence; Enslavement; Rape; Deprivation of liberty; Coercion; Incest
- Sentence: Life imprisonment with the possibility of parole after 15 years

The Fritzl case emerged in 2008 when a woman named Elisabeth Fritzl (born 6 April 1966) informed investigators in the city of Amstetten, Lower Austria, that she had been held captive for 24 years by her father, Josef Fritzl (born 9 April 1935). Fritzl had assaulted, sexually abused, and raped his daughter countless times during her imprisonment inside a concealed area in the cellar of the family home.

The incestuous rapes resulted in the birth of seven children. Three children remained in captivity with their mother, one died shortly after birth and was cremated by Fritzl, and the other three were brought up in the family home upstairs by Fritzl and his wife Rosemarie, after Fritzl convinced her and the authorities that they were foundlings each time.

Fritzl was arrested by Austrian police on counts of rape, false imprisonment, murder by negligence, and incest, one week after Elisabeth's eldest daughter, Kerstin, fell ill in the cellar and was taken to the hospital by Fritzl himself. In March 2009, Fritzl pleaded guilty to all counts and was sentenced to life imprisonment.

== History ==
Josef Mayrhoff
- Born: Josef Fritzl; 9 April 1935 (age 91); Amstetten, Lower Austria, Federal State of Austria
- Known for: Imprisoning and raping his daughter Elisabeth
- Spouse: Rosemarie Fritzl (m. 1956; div. 2012)
- Children: 15 (Note: Fritzl has 7 children with his wife Rosemarie, 7 children with his daughter Elisabeth, and 1 child with an artist from Ghana that he met on a work trip to the country during an ongoing Ebola epidemic.)
- Status: Incarcerated at Garsten Abbey
- Convictions: Murder by negligence, rape and other charges
- Penalty: Life imprisonment

=== Background ===
Josef Fritzl (now known as Mayrhoff) was born on 9 April 1935, in Amstetten, Lower Austria, to Josef Sr. and Maria (née Nenning) Fritzl. Josef Jr. grew up as an only child raised solely by his working mother, whom he alleges regularly subjected him to physical and emotional abuse throughout his childhood. His father, Josef Sr., a severe alcoholic, deserted the family when Josef Jr. was four years old and never again came into contact with him. Josef Sr. later fought as a soldier in the Wehrmacht during World War II and was killed in action in 1944. Josef Sr.'s name appears on a memorial plaque in Amstetten.

In 1956, aged 21, Josef Fritzl Jr. married 17-year-old Rosemarie (born 23 September 1939), with whom he had three sons and four daughters, including Elisabeth, who was born on 6 April 1966. Fritzl reportedly began sexually abusing Elisabeth in 1977, when she was aged 11.

After completing his education at an Höhere Technische Lehranstalt with a qualification in electrical engineering, Fritzl obtained a job at Voestalpine in Linz. From 1969 until 1971, he held a job in a construction-material firm in Amstetten. Later, he became a technical equipment salesman, travelling throughout Austria. Fritzl retired from active employment when he turned 60 in 1995, but continued some commercial activities. In addition to his apartment building in Amstetten, he rented out several other properties. In 1972, Fritzl purchased a guesthouse and an adjacent campsite at Mondsee, managing the property together with his wife until 1996.

=== Criminal history ===
In 1967, Fritzl broke into the Linz home of a 24-year-old nurse while her husband was away and raped her while holding a knife to her throat, threatening to kill her if she screamed. According to an annual report for 1967 and a press release of the same year, he was also named as a suspect in a case of attempted rape of a 21-year-old woman and was known for indecent exposure. Fritzl was arrested and served twelve months of an 18-month prison sentence.

In accordance with Austrian law, Fritzl's criminal record was expunged after fifteen years. As a result, more than 25 years later, the local social service authorities did not discover his criminal history when he applied to adopt and/or foster Elisabeth's children.

=== Suspected murders ===
On 12 November 1986, at 06:40, 17-year-old Martina Claudia Posch left her home in Vöcklabruck, Upper Austria, to reach a nearby bus stop. When she did not show up for an agreed meeting with her boyfriend at around 5 p.m., the boyfriend called Posch's mother, who had assumed her daughter was already with him. She later learned that Posch had not shown up for work that day. Authorities soon determined through witness statements that she had not been on the bus that morning either.

On 22 November 1986, two scuba divers found Posch's body wrapped in two olive green tarpaulins on the southern shore of Lake Mondsee. The forensic examination revealed that Posch had been killed by strangulation two hours after leaving her parents' home. After his arrest, Fritzl was investigated for possible involvement, since at the time of the murder, he and his wife ran a campground, which was located opposite where Posch was found. Posch was also very physically similar to his daughter, Elisabeth.

In addition to Posch's murder, Fritzl was looked into as a suspect in the death of Anna Neumayer, aged 17, who was killed with a captive bolt pistol in a field in Linz on 17 August 1966. She had disappeared on her way to Wels, 35 kilometres from where Fritzl worked at the time. Another potential victim was Gabriela Supeková, aged 42, a prostitute who was murdered in August 2007. Her body was found at the Lipno Reservoir near the Austrian–Czech border at the same time Fritzl was on holiday there. Fritzl was not charged with the murders due to a lack of evidence.

=== Captivity ===
After completing compulsory education at the age of 17, Elisabeth started a course to become a waitress. In January 1983 she ran away from home and went into hiding in Vienna with a friend from work. She was found by police within three weeks and returned to her parents in Amstetten. Elisabeth re-joined her waitress course, finished it in mid-1984 and was offered a job in Linz.

On 28 August 1984, Fritzl lured her into the basement of the family home, saying that he needed help carrying a door. In reality, he had been converting the basement into a makeshift prison chamber. The door was the last thing he needed to seal it. After Elisabeth held the door in place while Fritzl fitted it into the frame, he held a Diethyl ether-soaked towel on her face until she was unconscious, then moved her into the chamber.

After Elisabeth's disappearance, Rosemarie filed a missing persons report. Almost a month later, Fritzl handed over a letter to the police, the first of several that he had forced Elisabeth to write while she was in captivity. The letter, postmarked in Braunau am Inn, stated that she was tired of living with her family and was staying with a friend. She warned her parents not to look for her or she would leave the country. Fritzl told police that she had most likely joined a cult.

Over the next 24 years, Fritzl entered the hidden chamber almost every day, for a minimum of three times a week, bringing food and other supplies, and repeatedly raping Elisabeth. She gave birth to seven children during her captivity. One child died shortly after birth. Three—Lisa, Monika, and Alexander—were removed from the chamber as infants to live with Fritzl and his wife, who were approved by local social services authorities as their foster parents. Officials said that Fritzl "very plausibly" explained how three of his infant grandchildren had appeared on his doorstep. The family received regular visits from social workers, who saw and heard nothing to arouse their suspicions.

Following the fourth child's birth in 1994, Fritzl allowed the enlargement of the chamber, from 35 to 55 m^{2} (380 to 590 sq ft), putting Elisabeth and her children to work digging out soil with their bare hands for years. The captives had television, radio and a videotape player. Food could be stored in a refrigerator and cooked or heated on a hot plate. Elisabeth taught the children to read and write. At times, Fritzl would punish the family by shutting off their lights or refusing to deliver food for days at a time. He told Elisabeth and the three children who remained, Kerstin, Stefan and Felix, that they would be gassed if they tried to escape. Investigators concluded that this was an empty threat to frighten the victims; there was no gas supply to the basement. Fritzl also told them that they would be electrocuted if they tried to meddle with the cellar door.

According to his sister-in-law Christine, Fritzl entered the basement every morning at 09:00, ostensibly to draw plans for machines which he sold to manufacturing firms. He often stayed there for the night and did not allow his wife to bring him coffee. A tenant who rented a ground floor room in the house for twelve years claimed to hear noises from the basement, which Fritzl said were caused by the "faulty pipes" or the gas heating system.

=== Discovery ===
On 19 April 2008, Fritzl agreed to seek medical attention after Kerstin, Elisabeth's eldest daughter, fell unconscious. Elisabeth helped him carry Kerstin out of the chamber and saw the outside world for the first time in 24 years. He forced Elisabeth to return to the chamber, where she remained for a final week. Kerstin was taken by ambulance to a local hospital, the Landesklinikum Amstetten, and was admitted in serious condition with life-threatening kidney failure. Fritzl later arrived at the hospital claiming to have found a note written by Kerstin's mother. He discussed Kerstin's condition and the note with a doctor, Albert Reiter.

Medical staff found aspects of Fritzl's story puzzling and alerted police on 21 April. The police broadcast an appeal on public media for the missing mother to come forward and provide information about Kerstin's medical history. The investigation into Elisabeth's disappearance was also reopened. Fritzl repeated his story about Elisabeth being in a cult, and presented what he claimed was the "most recent letter" from her, dated January 2008, posted from the town of Kematen. The police contacted Manfred Wohlfahrt, a church officer and expert on cults, who raised doubts about the existence of the group Fritzl described. He noted that Elisabeth's letters seemed dictated and oddly written.

Elisabeth pleaded with Fritzl to be taken to the hospital where Kerstin was being treated. On 26 April he released her from the cellar along with her sons Stefan and Felix, bringing them upstairs, at which time he and Elisabeth went to the hospital. Following a tip-off from Albert Reiter that the Fritzls were at the hospital, the police detained them on the hospital grounds and took them to a police station for questioning.

Elisabeth did not provide police with more details until they promised her that she would never have to see her father again. Over the next two hours, she told the story of her 24 years in captivity. Elisabeth recounted that Fritzl raped her and forced her to watch pornographic videos, which he made her re-enact with him in front of her children in order to humiliate her. Fritzl, aged 73, was quickly arrested on suspicion of serious crimes against family members.

During the night of 27 April, Elisabeth, her children and her mother Rosemarie were taken into care. Fritzl told investigators how to enter the chamber through a small hidden door, opened by a secret keyless entry code. According to Elisabeth, Rosemarie had been unaware of what had been happening in their home.

On 29 April, it was announced that DNA evidence confirmed Fritzl as the biological father of his daughter's children. His defence lawyer, Rudolf Mayer, said that although the DNA test proved incest, evidence was still needed for the allegations of rape and enslavement. In their 1 May daily Press conference, police stated that Fritzl had forced Elisabeth to write a letter the previous year, which indicated that he may have been planning to release her and the children. The letter said that she wanted to come home but "it's not possible yet." Police believe Fritzl was planning to pretend to have rescued his daughter from her fictitious cult. Police spokesman Franz Polzer said police planned to interview at least 100 people who had lived as tenants in the Fritzl home in the previous 24 years.

=== Prosecutor's investigation ===
Pursuant to the agreement that she would never have to see her father again, Elisabeth gave videotaped testimony before Austrian prosecutors and investigators on 11 July 2008. On 13 November, authorities released an indictment against Fritzl. He stood trial for the murder of the infant Michael, who died shortly after birth, and faced between ten years' and life imprisonment. Fritzl was also charged with rape, incest, kidnapping, false imprisonment and slavery, which carry a maximum twenty-year term.

=== Self-portrayal and psychiatric assessment ===
Fritzl stated that his decision to imprison Elisabeth came about after she "did not adhere to any rules any more" when she became a teenager. "That is why I had to do something; I had to create a place where I could keep Elisabeth, by force if necessary, away from the outside world." He suggested that the emphasis on discipline during the Nazi annexation of Austria, which ended when he was ten years old, might have influenced his views about decency and good behaviour. The chief editors of News magazine noted in an editorial that they expected Fritzl's statement to form the basis of his lawyer's defense strategy. Critics said his statement may have been a ploy to prepare an insanity defense.

Reflecting on his childhood, Fritzl initially described his mother as "the best woman in the world" and "as strict as it was necessary." Later, he expressed a negative opinion of his mother and said that "she used to beat me, hit me until I was lying in a pool of blood on the floor. It left me feeling totally humiliated and weak. My mother was a servant and she used to work hard all her life, I never had a kiss from her, I was never cuddled although I wanted it – I wanted that she would be good to me." He claimed that she called him "a Satan, a criminal, a no-good", and that he "had a horrible fear from her".

In 1959, after Fritzl had married and bought his house, his mother moved in with them. Over time, their roles reversed, and his mother came to fear him. Eventually, he also admitted he had later locked his mother in the attic and bricked up her window after telling neighbors that she had died, keeping her locked away until her death in 1980. It is unknown how long Fritzl held his mother captive, but newspapers have speculated that it may have been up to twenty years.

In a report by forensic psychiatrist Adelheid Kastner, Fritzl's mother is described as unpredictable and abusive. Fritzl referred to himself as an "alibi child", meaning that his mother only gave birth to him to prove that she was not barren and could produce children. Fritzl claimed that his behaviour is innate. During his prison sentence for the earlier rape conviction, he admitted that he planned to lock his daughter up so that he could contain and express his "evil side." He said, "I was born to rape, and I held myself back for a relatively long time. I could have behaved a lot worse than locking up my daughter."

Kastner diagnosed Fritzl as having a "severe combined personality disorder" which included borderline, schizotypal and schizoid types and a sexual disorder, recommending that Fritzl receive psychiatric care for the rest of his life. Later reports have revealed Fritzl's premeditated plan to lock his daughter up was not for discipline, but for his own gratification.

== Chamber ==
The Fritzl property in Amstetten is a building dating from around 1890. A newer building was added after 1978, when Fritzl applied for a building permit for an "extension with basement." In 1983, building inspectors visited the site and verified that the new extension had been built according to the dimensions specified on the permit. Fritzl had illegally enlarged the room by excavating space for a much larger basement, concealed by walls. Around 1981 or 1982, according to his statement, Fritzl started to turn this hidden cellar into a prison chamber and installed a sink, toilet, bed, hot plate and a refrigerator. In 1983, he added more space by creating a passageway to a pre-existing basement area under the old part of the property, of which only he knew.

The concealed cellar had a 5 m-long (16 ft) corridor, a storage area and three small open cells, connected by narrow passageways, along with a basic cooking area and bathroom facilities, followed by two sleeping areas, which were equipped with two beds each. It covered an area of approximately 55 m^{2} (590 sq ft). The cell had two access points: a hinged door that weighed 500 kg (1,100 lb), which is thought to have become unusable over the years because of its weight, and a metal door, reinforced with concrete and on steel rails that weighed 300 kg (660 lb), and measured 1 m (3.3 ft) high and 60 cm (2.0 ft) wide. It was located behind a shelf in Fritzl's basement workshop, protected by an electronic code entered using a remote control unit. In order to reach this door, five locking basement rooms had to be crossed. To get to the area where Elisabeth and her children were held, eight doors in total needed to be unlocked, of which two doors were additionally secured by electronic locking devices.

== Key events ==
Date	Key event
1977	Fritzl begins sexually abusing his 11-year-old daughter Elisabeth.
1980	Fritzl's mother, Maria, dies in captivity in Fritzl's attic.
1981–1982	Fritzl begins to turn the hidden cellar into a prison chamber.
28 August 1984	Fritzl lures 18-year-old Elisabeth into the basement and imprisons her.
November 1986	Elisabeth has a miscarriage in the tenth week of pregnancy.
30 August 1988	Kerstin is born, and lives in the cellar until the age of 19 in 2008.
1 February 1990	Stefan is born. He also stays in the cellar until 2008, aged 18.
29 August 1992	Lisa is born. In May 1993, at nine months of age, she is discovered outside the family home in a cardboard box, allegedly left there by Elisabeth with a note asking for the child to be looked after.
1993	After repeated requests by Elisabeth, Fritzl allows the enlargement of the prison, putting Elisabeth and her children to work for years digging out soil with their hands. The prison was enlarged from 35 to 55 m^{2} (380 to 590 sq ft).
26 February 1994	The fourth child, Monika, is born.
December 1994	Monika, at ten months of age, is found in a pushchair (stroller) outside the entrance of the house. Shortly afterwards, Fritzl's wife Rosemarie receives a phone call, asking her to take care of the child. The caller sounds like Elisabeth, but it is assumed that Fritzl used a recording of her voice. Rosemarie reported the incident to the police, expressing astonishment that Elisabeth knew their new, ex-directory phone number.
28 April 1996	Elisabeth gives birth to twin boys, Michael and Alexander. The first one dies after less than three days and Fritzl removes and cremates the body. The surviving twin, Alexander, is taken upstairs at fifteen months old and "discovered" in circumstances similar to those of his two sisters.
16 December 2002	Felix is born. According to a statement by Fritzl, he kept Felix in the cellar with Elisabeth and her two eldest children because his wife could not look after another child.
19 April 2008	Fritzl arranges for critically ill 19-year-old Kerstin to be taken to a local hospital.
26 April 2008	During the evening, Fritzl releases Elisabeth, Stefan, and Felix from the cellar and brings them upstairs, informing his wife that Elisabeth had decided to come home after a 24-year absence. Later that evening, after an anonymous tipoff during a visit to the hospital, Fritzl and Elisabeth are taken into police custody where she reveals her decades-long imprisonment during questioning.
19 March 2009	After a four-day trial, Fritzl pleads guilty to the charges of the murder by negligence of his infant son (and grandson) Michael, as well as the decades of slavery, incest, rape, coercion and false imprisonment of his daughter Elisabeth, and is sentenced to life imprisonment.

== Trial ==
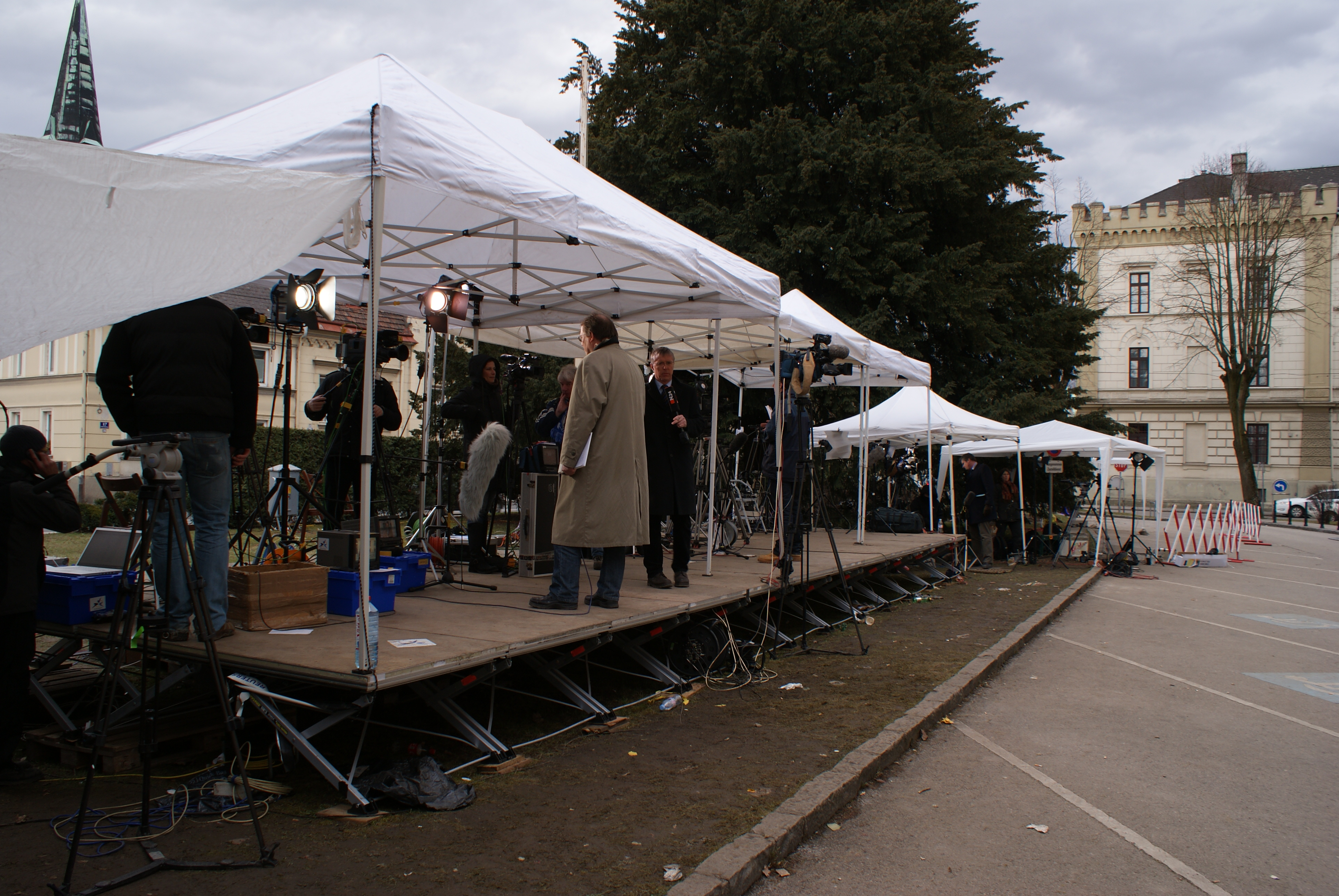
Journalists during the Fritzl trial

The trial of Josef Fritzl began on 16 March 2009, in St. Pölten, presided over by Judge Andrea Humer. On the first day, Fritzl entered the courtroom attempting to hide his face from cameras behind a blue folder, which he was entitled to do under Austrian law. After opening statements, all journalists and spectators were asked to leave the courtroom, whereupon Fritzl lowered his folder. Fritzl pleaded guilty to all charges with the exception of murder and grievous assault by threatening to gas his captives if they disobeyed him.

In his opening remarks, Rudolf Mayer, the defending counsel, appealed to the jury to be objective and not be swayed by emotions. He insisted Fritzl was "not a monster," stating that he had brought a Christmas tree down to his captives in the cellar during the holiday season. Christiane Burkheiser, prosecuting her first case since being appointed Chief Prosecutor, pressed for life imprisonment in an institution for the criminally insane. She demonstrated for jurors the low height of the ceiling in the cellar dungeon, by making a mark on the door to the courtroom at 174 cm (5 ft 8.5 in) and described the cellar as "damp and mouldy", passing around a box of musty objects taken from the cellar, the odour of which made jurors flinch.

On the first day of testimony, jurors watched eleven hours of testimony recorded by Elisabeth in sessions with police and psychologists in July 2008. The tape is said to have been so "harrowing" that the eight jurors did not watch more than two hours at a time. Four replacement jurors were on standby to replace any of the regular jurors in case they could not bear to hear any more of the evidence. Besides the video testimony, Elisabeth's older brother Harald testified that he was physically abused by Fritzl as a child. Fritzl's wife, Rosemarie, and Elisabeth's children refused to testify.

On 18 March 2009, Elisabeth attended the second day of the criminal trial against her father, in preparation for a book she wrote about her ordeal. She did not plan to see her father again. Fritzl's attorney confirmed that she had been in the visitors' gallery in disguise at the time her video testimony was aired. "Josef Fritzl recognised that Elisabeth was in court and, from this point on, you could see Josef Fritzl going pale and he broke down," Mayer said. "It was a meeting of eyes that changed his mind." The next day, Fritzl began the proceedings by approaching the judge and changing his pleas to guilty on all charges.

On 19 March 2009, Fritzl was sentenced to life imprisonment without the possibility of parole for fifteen years. He said that he accepted the sentence and would not appeal. Fritzl is currently serving out his sentence in Garsten Abbey, a former monastery in Upper Austria converted into a prison.

=== Government response ===
In 2008, Chancellor of Austria Alfred Gusenbauer said he planned to launch a foreign public image campaign for his country, in light of the "abominable events."

== Aftermath ==
Judge Humer, who presided over the trial, stated medical experts reported Elisabeth and her children were in "relatively good health." After being taken into care, Elisabeth, all six of her surviving children and her mother were housed in a local clinic, where they were shielded from the outside environment and received medical and psychological treatment. Members of the Fritzl family were offered new identities, but it was emphasized that it was their choice to make.

Berthold Kepplinger, head of the clinic where Elisabeth and her children were being treated, said that Elisabeth and the three children held captive in the cellar required further therapy to help them adjust to natural light after years in semi-darkness. They also needed treatment to help them cope with all the extra space that they now had in which to move about.

In May 2008, a handmade poster created by Elisabeth, her children and her mother at the therapy facility was displayed in the Amstetten Town Centre. The message thanked local people for their support. "We, the whole family, would like to take the opportunity to thank all of you for sympathy at our fate," they wrote in their message. "Your compassion is helping us greatly to overcome these difficult times, and it shows us there also are good and honest people here who really care for us. We hope that soon there will be a time where [sic] we can find our way back into a normal life."

Kerstin was reunited with her family on 8 June 2008, when she was awakened from her artificially induced coma. Doctors said that she would make a full recovery. It was revealed that Elisabeth and her children had been more traumatized than previously thought. During captivity, Kerstin tore out her hair in clumps and was reported to have shredded her dresses before stuffing them in the toilet. Stefan could not walk properly, because of his height of 173 cm (5 ft 8 in), which had forced him to stoop in the 168 cm-high (5 ft 6 in) cellar. It has also been revealed that normal everyday occurrences, such as the dimming of lights or the closing of doors, plunged Kerstin and Stefan into anxiety and panic attacks. The other three of Elisabeth's children who were raised by their father were being treated for anger and resentment at the events.

In July 2008, it emerged that Elisabeth ordered her mother Rosemarie out of the villa they had been sharing, in a secret location set up for them by a psychiatric hospital. Elisabeth was upset about Rosemarie's passiveness during her upbringing.

Lawyer Christoph Herbst, who represents Elisabeth and her family, said, "Fortunately, everything is going very well"; they spend their time answering hundreds of letters from all over the world. Felix, Kerstin and Stefan, brought up underground with their mother, have learned to swim. In August 2008, all of Elisabeth's children attended a four-day summer camp organised by firefighters, with 4,000 other young campers. The children, along with their mother, have made day trips, including swimming outings, where care was taken to keep them out of reach of the paparazzi and to protect their privacy.

In March 2009, Elisabeth and her children were forced to move out of the family's hide-away home, and returned to the psychiatric clinic where medical staff had started trying to heal the family and unite the "upstairs" and "downstairs" siblings during the previous year. Elisabeth was reported to be distraught and close to a breakdown after a British paparazzi burst into her kitchen and started taking photographs.

After the trial, Elisabeth and her six children were moved to an unnamed village in northern Austria, where they were living in a fortress-like house. All of the children require ongoing therapy. Factors that traumatised the "upstairs" children include learning that Fritzl had lied to them about their mother abandoning them, the abuse they had received from him during their childhood, and finding out that their siblings had been imprisoned in the cellar. The "downstairs" children receive therapy due to their deprivation from normal development, the lack of fresh air and sunshine while held captive, and the abuse that they and their mother had received from Fritzl when he came to the basement.

All of the children might have genetic problems common to children born of incest. In March 2009, Elisabeth was said to be estranged from her mother, Rosemarie, who accepted Fritzl's story about Elisabeth joining a cult, and did not pursue the matter further. Elisabeth allows her three children who grew up in the Fritzl household to visit their grandmother regularly. Rosemarie lives alone in a small apartment.

A March 2010 article in The Independent stated that Elisabeth and her children recovered remarkably well, given the difficult lives they endured for so long. According to Fritzl's sister-in-law, Christine, Elisabeth enjoys spending her time shopping, taking frequent showers and driving. She passed her driving test without difficulty. Her relationship with Thomas Wagner, one of her bodyguards, who is 23 years younger than Elisabeth, was reported to be ongoing, with him becoming a big-brother figure to her children. All of Elisabeth's children have developed normal sibling relationships with each other, and after having trouble dealing with the traumatic events, the three "upstairs" children slowly began recognising Elisabeth as their mother. The children enjoy being outdoors, playing video games and spending time with their mother and grandmother. Despite their strained relationship, Elisabeth and her mother started visiting each other more, and Elisabeth had reportedly forgiven her mother for believing her father's story.

In June 2013, workers began filling the basement of the Fritzl home with concrete. Estate liquidator Walter Anzboeck stated that the construction would cost €100,000 and would take a week to complete. The house was to be sold on the open market. While most neighbours approved of the proposal, some preferred that the property be demolished due to its sordid history. In 2015, asylum seekers were offered the house to live in. The house was sold for €160,000 in December 2016, with the buyers voicing their intention to convert the building into apartments.

In May 2017, Fritzl changed his name to Josef Mayrhoff, probably due to getting into a prison fight where several of his teeth were knocked out, after other inmates set up a fake dating profile with his name and picture. In March 2019, Mark Perry, a British journalist who interviewed Fritzl in his cell, said he showed no remorse for his crimes, recalling that he kept saying, "Just look into the cellars of other people, you might find other families and girls down there." In April 2019, it was reported that Fritzl's health was declining and that he did not want to live anymore.

In September 2021, a decision was made to release Fritzl from a psychiatric detention facility to a regular prison, where he was to continue to serve his life sentence. That decision was based on a psychiatric report which said he no longer posed any danger. In November 2021, the ruling was appealed and overturned, and the Regional Court of Krems was ordered to reconsider the case.

In late April 2022, a panel of three judges decided that Fritzl could be moved. The decision was based on a supplementary psychiatric report submitted in March. The court ruled that he would remain in the psychiatric facility until an appeal to the Higher Regional Court in Vienna was heard. The move to a regular prison would mean that Fritzl, who received a life sentence, was eligible for parole in 2023, having served the initial fifteen years of his sentence. In January 2024, Fritzl applied to Krems regional court for release from prison into a nursing home, but the application was rejected.

On 25 January 2024, the Higher Regional Court approved Fritzl's move to a regular prison, amid reports that he was suffering from dementia. Within a week, prosecutors filed a complaint seeking to overturn the decision in a higher court. In May 2024, the court dismissed the complaint and again ruled that Fritzl should be transferred. In November 2026 Fritzl lost another case for a release. Fritzl, now suffering from heavy dementia and in his 90s, is likely to spend the remainder of his life imprisoned.

== Media ==
The case was featured in the 2008 documentary, The Longest Night: Secrets of the Austrian Cellar and the 2010 documentary, Monster: The Josef Fritzl Story. The 2009 book The Crimes of Josef Fritzl: Uncovering the Truth, by Stefanie Marsh and Bojan Pancevski, is about the case. The 2009 true crime book Secrets in the Cellar by John Glatt details the case.

Room author Emma Donoghue was inspired by the crimes, and her novel inspired a film adaptation with the same name. In 2021, Lifetime released a film inspired by the Fritzl case titled Girl in the Basement which is part of Lifetime's "Ripped from the Headlines" feature films. The film is directed by Elisabeth Röhm and it stars Stefanie Scott, Judd Nelson, and Joely Fisher. The only difference is that the family name is Cody, and the victim is named Sara, and her sister Amy. Josef was re-named Don, while Rosemarie was renamed Irene. The children were named Marie, Thomas, Michael, and Grace to protect the truth from the story.

== See also ==
- 2019 South Wales paternal sex abuse case – Child sexual abuse case in Wales
- Álvarez incest case – Incest case in Mariquita, Colombia
- Ariel Castro kidnappings – 2002–2004 kidnappings in Cleveland, Ohio, US
- Armando Lucero – Criminal case in Argentina
- Inbreeding – Reproduction by closely related organisms
- Kidnapping of Jaycee Dugard – 1991 American kidnapping case
- List of kidnappings
- List of long-term false imprisonment cases
- Lydia Gouardo – French woman (born 1962)
- Moe incest case – Australian criminal case
- Mongelli case – Sexual abuse case in Italy
- Natascha Kampusch (her case also happened in Austria)
- Sheffield incest case – Incest case
