= Moe incest case =

Australian criminal case

The Moe incest case emerged in February 2007 when a woman, identified only as M for legal reasons, reported to Victoria Police in the Australian town of Moe, Victoria that her 63-year-old father, RSJ, had raped her, physically abused her, and kept her prisoner in her own home between 1977 and 2005.

== Background ==
Police first learned about the alleged abuse in 2005, when M first came forward, but could not act because she did not want to co-operate after her father threatened violence against her mother and siblings.

The J family had been known to authorities for more than 30 years at the time the abuse came to light; three of RSJ's six children with his wife had died and others have spent time in state care. The allegations first emerged in a news report that said authorities had failed to investigate after being warned of the abuse years earlier.

During the years of abuse, M gave birth to four of her father's children, each in a major hospital in the state capital Melbourne. One child, the only girl, died from severe brain and respiratory developmental problems at eleven weeks old, two of the surviving boys are seriously intellectually disabled, and the third has a major speech impediment and social interaction problems. None of the children had a father listed on their birth certificate, raising concerns about why questions were not asked at the time. The victim's mother was allegedly unaware of any abuse, despite sharing a house with her daughter, husband, and grandchildren until 2005.

== Trial ==
RSJ was charged with 83 sexual abuse offences by police in June 2008 after DNA tests showed he was the father of M's surviving sons, LJ, CJ, and NS; M and her sons were taken into the care of the Victorian authorities.

RSJ appeared in court in November 2009, where he pleaded guilty to ten counts of incest, two counts of indecent assault of a girl under the age of 16, and one count of common assault, also asking for the remaining 70 counts against him to be taken into consideration.

During his sentencing on 15 February 2010, County Court Judge Susan Pullen said: "You defiled your daughter over many years on a regular basis. Your offending involved a gross breach of trust. To describe your treatment of your daughter as appalling is a gross understatement."

RSJ was sentenced to 22 years and five months' imprisonment with a parole ineligibility period of 18 years: Judge Pullen also sentenced him as a serious sexual offender, and ordered that he be placed on the sex offender registry and comply with reporting obligations for the rest of his life.

His appeal against the sentence was dismissed on 29 June 2012.

=== Death of perpetrator in custody ===
The perpetrator died of lung cancer in Port Phillip Prison on 13 September 2024 at the age of 81, with the report of the coroner's findings being released on 7 April 2025: his identity was revealed by the Coroner's Court to be John Stuart Richards.

With time in custody taken into account, Richards would have been eligible for parole in February 2027, and the sentence was to expire in July 2031.

== See also ==
- Colt clan incest case
- Fritzl case
- Goler clan
