= 2014 Santa Ana kidnapping accusation =

Criminal case in California, United States

In May 2014, Isidro Medrano Garcia (aged 41 or 42), who had been living under the name Tomas Medrano or Tomas Madrano, was arrested and accused by police of kidnapping a 15-year-old girl in 2004 and repeatedly raping her and continuing to hold her captive until 2014. Garcia was accused of forcing the alleged victim to marry him in 2007. As time moved on, the woman had a child with Garcia on October 27, 2010, or in 2012, and they continued to live openly together as a family in Bell Gardens, California, until the woman contacted her sister through Facebook and met with her mother in April 2014. She filed a domestic violence complaint with Bell Gardens police on May 19, 2014. As a married couple, Garcia and the woman had an apparently active social life in the community, including hosting large parties and the woman spending time and running errands by herself, having her own car, and working outside the home (with Garcia). However, police said the woman had tried to escape twice and been severely beaten. Through his attorney, Garcia claimed that the woman made up the story of abuse because the couple was breaking up.

After a trial in early 2016, Garcia was found guilty of three felony counts of lewd acts on a minor, was sentenced to four years and four months in prison, and was required to register as a sex offender. He was found not guilty of kidnapping, and the charge of forcible rape was dismissed.

== Context of the case ==
Some neighbors and a nanny for their child reported that the man and woman were active as a couple in the local church and social community and showed no apparent signs of serious problems prior to the man's arrest. A neighbor said, "He treats her like a queen. He does his best to do whatever she wants", and said the woman had her own car. However, some other neighbors said they sensed that not all was well. One said that Garcia seemed to closely watch her, and that when she noticed he was watching from their apartment, she would rapidly go back inside.

The girl was born in Mexico and had unlawfully entered the U.S. from Mexico in February 2004 (about six months before her alleged kidnapping) to join her mother and sister who were living in Santa Ana, California. Garcia was the girl's mother's live-in boyfriend, and allegedly began abusing her while she lived with her mother. Following a domestic argument between the girl's mother and Garcia, the girl left home and went to a park, where Garcia found her and allegedly drugged and kidnapped her and then held her captive in a garage in Compton while telling her that no one was looking for her and that she would be deported if she was found. She was unable to speak English at the time, and Garcia allegedly used this to intimidate her. The girl's mother filed a missing person's report in August 2004, shortly after the alleged abduction, and had suspected that Garcia had abducted her.

After she contacted her mother a decade later in 2014, her mother reportedly showed her old news articles to prove that she had been looking for her and had filed a missing person's report. This reportedly helped convince her to go to the police and file a report about her alleged abduction.

It was alleged that during her captivity, the woman had been moved at least four times and had been given multiple fake identities.

Garcia held various jobs during the period of the alleged captivity, and the woman and Garcia had been working together outside the home for a night cleaning service – including cleaning a building that houses offices of the Los Angeles County Department of Children and Family Services. At the time of the arrest, Garcia was also working a second job, at a nearby Chinese restaurant.

== Formal charges, trial, and outcome ==
On June 9, 2014, Garcia pleaded not guilty to charges including kidnapping, rape, and three counts of lewd acts on a minor. His bail was set at $1 million, and he faced up to 19 years in prison if convicted. In a report about the arraignment, neighbor Jose Polanco was quoted as saying "What she is saying is a lie," and "She was a free woman," and other neighbors were also reported to be supporting Garcia and portraying the couple as a seemingly happy pair who threw parties and took trips to Disneyland. On April 24, 2015, Garcia was ordered to stand trial on charges of rape and kidnapping.

The trial began on February 11, 2016.

The woman testified that Garcia kidnapped her in 2004, took her to a home in Compton, provided her with a false identity and held her against her will for a decade. Between August 2004 and April 2014, she said Garcia "controlled" her by saying her family did not want her and were not looking for her, and that if she reported him to police she would get in trouble for using a false ID. The teen did not speak English and had come to the U.S. from Mexico illegally, according to Santa Ana Police Department. The police department said that when she tried to escape, she was caught and beaten. A police news release in May 2014 alleged that "Even with the opportunity to escape, after years of physical and mental abuse, the victim saw no way out of her situation and lived a life with Garcia under sustained physical and mental abuse". According to the Orange County District Attorney, the woman became pregnant with his child in 2010. Police had previously said she had the child in 2012. She said he held her in captivity and got her a job where he worked and did not let her out of his sight, the district attorney stated. That job was at a nighttime cleaning service, according to police. The district attorney said that a decade-long ordeal first began in February 2004 when Garcia and the victim met while he lived with her and her mother. He allegedly then "groomed" the then-15-year-old by buying her gifts and siding with her during arguments with her mother. The woman claimed that he forcibly raped her at least once, sexually assaulted her three times, and touched her buttocks and kissed her. Santa Ana police first responded to a mutual domestic violence incident between Garcia and the woman's mother in August 2004, shortly before her disappearance, "but a case could not be proven at that time", according to the district attorney. The mother identified Garcia as her boyfriend and had told a neighbor prior to the alleged abduction that she believed they were having sex and planned on leaving together, the Los Angeles Times reported.

On March 4, 2016, Garcia was found guilty of three felony counts of lewd acts on a minor, was sentenced to four years and four months in prison, and was required to register as a sex offender for life. He was found not guilty of kidnapping to commit a sexual offense, and a felony charge of forcible rape was dismissed by request of the district attorney after the jury was unable to reach a decision on that charge.
