= Sheffield incest case =

Incest case

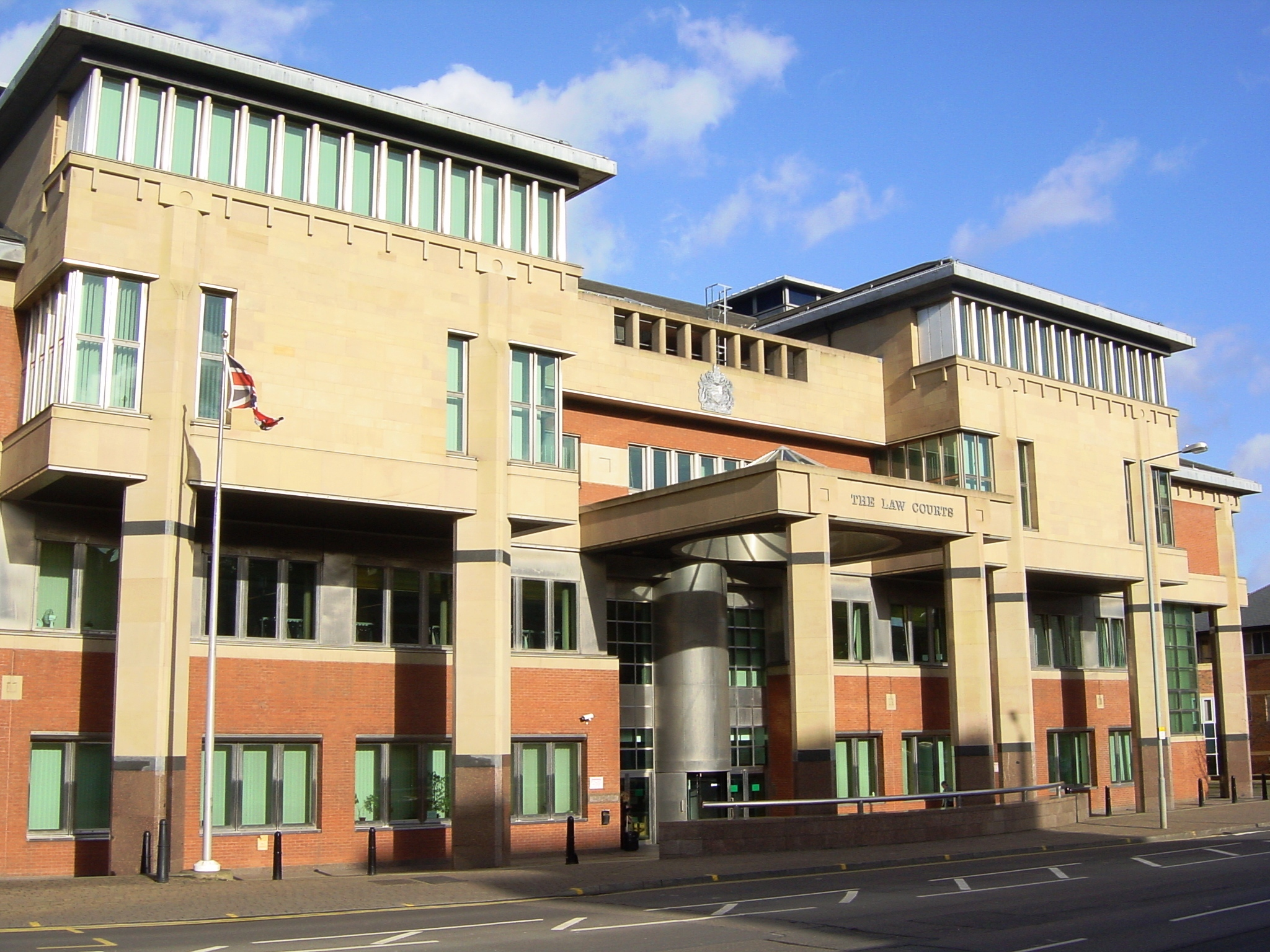
Sheffield Crown Court, where the verdict was announced

The Sheffield incest case concerns the conviction in November 2008 in Sheffield Crown Court of a 54-year-old English man who, undetected over a period of 25 years, repeatedly raped his two daughters and fathered seven surviving children with them. Apparently unrepentant, he received 25 concurrent life sentences and is required to serve a minimum of fourteen and a half years in prison. His original sentence was life with a minimum period of 19 years 6 months, but this was overturned on appeal, having been ruled excessive. After this and a similar incest case in Swindon in 2003, independent inquiries were set up to examine the way in which the case was dealt with by local authorities, the medical profession, and child help agencies.

== "British Fritzl" ==
The defendant in the case was referred to as the "British Fritzl", "The Gaffer" (a name he called himself), or "Mr X." Because of a court order to protect his daughters and their seven surviving children his name has not been formally revealed. He was responsible for forcibly impregnating his daughters multiple times from the early 1980s until his arrest in 2008. Parallels were drawn between him and Josef Fritzl, the perpetrator of an Austrian incest case which had come to light a few months earlier.

== Prolonged incestuous abuse ==
The man continued the abuse by frequently relocating his family to keep them isolated, keeping them out of school when they had any visible injuries, and threatening them with violence. The children's mother had left some years before due to the violence she endured.

The sexual abuse began when the girls were eight and ten years old. The perpetrator would call their names in the middle of the night and even smear "fake blood" on their doors while they were sleeping. He used threatening behaviour to enforce the abuse, including beating the victims and pushing their heads close to a gas fire so they were scorched if they moved away. He threatened to kill both of them and their children if they told anyone about the abuse. All the children said he dominated the family. To begin with, the attacks occurred every day, then every two to three days, with the one daughter babysitting while the other was raped. He continued to rape them while they were pregnant.

His two daughters had nineteen pregnancies between them, including five miscarriages, five terminations, and two children dying soon after birth. Seven of their children survived. He was said to have 'taken pleasure' from the harm he was inflicting and the fathering of the children, despite the difficult pregnancies and deaths. If they took contraceptive pills, he told them to stop it and they felt they had to obey.

The women's relationships with their current partners gave them the courage to come forward. Although the man at first denied the crimes, DNA testing confirmed that he was the father of the women's children. The women said that while his imprisonment gave them the knowledge that he could not physically touch them again, the suffering he caused would continue for many years and they now had to concentrate on finding the strength to rebuild their lives.

== Response of government and local authorities ==
Gordon Brown, the Prime Minister at the time, responded to the concerns of MPs from Sheffield, including Nick Clegg the leader of the Liberal Democrats, and David Blunkett by saying he was "outraged at the unspeakable abuse committed", and any changes to the system that were needed would be made.

The case had gone undetected by social services agencies, schools and hospitals, despite the numerous pregnancies, and despite the girls at times having unexplained injuries. Schools attributed facial injuries of the girls to bullying. The victims had hidden from hospitals that the children were fathered by their own father. The man had previously been faced with reports of the incestuous rape of his daughters in a police complaint filed by their brother, but no action was taken by the police, as they considered the brother's word to be hearsay evidence that would not hold up in court, and because the girls would not say anything, due to intimidation.

Family members reported their concerns to the authorities over two decades but nothing was done. Social workers stated that because the father moved the family so often, the girls had little opportunity to form close relationships with teachers, other professionals, or anyone else, reducing the chance of the incest being disclosed. They were known to social services in both Lincolnshire and South Yorkshire, but the abuse was not recognised. In 2008, the family doctor who failed to recognise or report the abuse was suspended by the General Medical Council.

In summing up, the judge stated that although the phrase was overused, it was difficult to imagine a worse case; he had not seen a similar case in forty years of criminal law practice, with no action taken, in spite of obvious signs and agencies' suspicions, and that was why it was going to independent Serious Case Review into the failings of the local authorities and the police. This was conducted by Pat Cantrill, who reported in March 2010.

== Medical guidelines ==
Doctors were said to have failed professional guidelines of the General Medical Council by not informing the authorities, and the handling of the case, together with the failure of institutions to share information with each other, breached recommendations following a review of another case of protracted incest four years before in Swindon.

The family doctor who failed to recognise the signs had already been suspended by the GMC four years before, due to his falling below the minimum standard to the extent that he was exposing patients to risk. Before this doctor's suspension and subsequent departure from practice, the father would bring his daughters with the complications from their nineteen pregnancies and other injuries to him if they needed to see a doctor, even when they moved out of the area. The County Council's director of children's services said treatment of such cases was now handled differently from when the childhood abuse occurred.

== Child protection ==
The case coincided with several other cases in the United Kingdom which highlighted possible problems with the efficiency of child protection services. The Prime Minister, Gordon Brown, stated that the whole country was appalled at the crime and the many chances there may have been for the abuse, which continued for 28 years, to be stopped.

The father was said by his sister-in-law to have been motivated in part by wanting to keep for himself the money paid to him by the state in welfare benefits for the numerous children. There were said to have been 150 opportunities for authorities to notice what was happening. For several months, the women tried to pay their father to stop him raping them by giving him £100 a month. They gave him whisky, hoping his drinking would lead to his death. They had called ChildLine, but the organisation was unable to guarantee that their children would not be taken from them, which their father had said would happen, so they ended the call.

== See also ==
- List of long-term false imprisonment cases
