= Natascha Kampusch =

Austrian kidnapping survivor (born 1988)

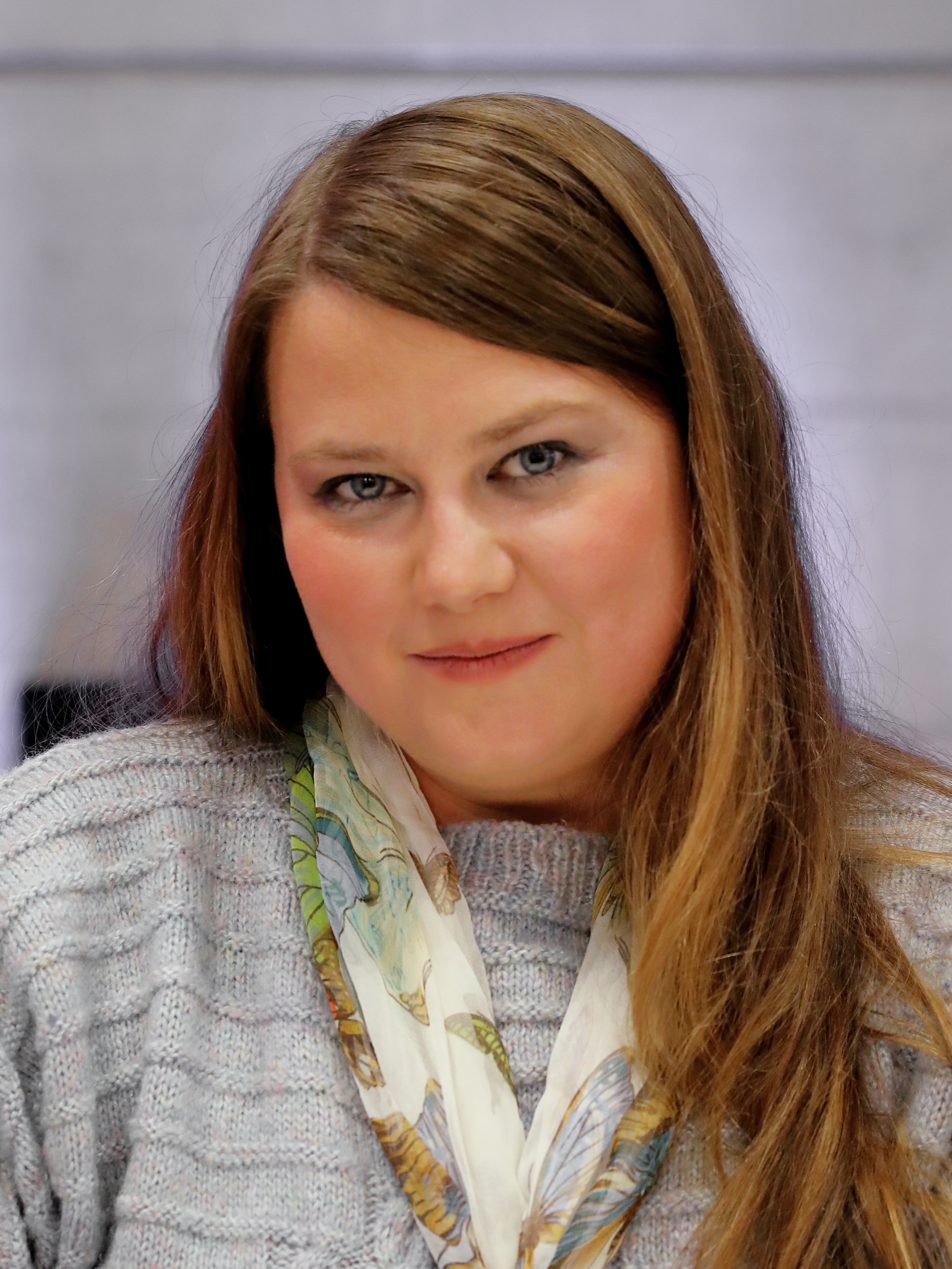
- Kampusch in 2019
- Born: 17 February 1988 (age 38); Vienna, Austria
- Disappeared: 2 March 1998; Vienna, Austria
- Status: Found alive on 23 August 2006
- Known for: Kidnap survivor

Natascha Maria Kampusch (born 17 February 1988) is an Austrian author and former talk show host. At the age of 10, on 2 March 1998, she was abducted and held in a secret cellar by her kidnapper, Wolfgang Přiklopil, for more than eight years, until she escaped on 23 August 2006. Upon her escape, Přiklopil died by suicide by train at a nearby station. She wrote a book about her ordeal, 3,096 Days (2010), which was later adapted into a film that was released in 2013.

== Early life ==
Kampusch was raised by her mother, Brigitta Sirny (née Kampusch), and her father, Ludwig Koch, in Vienna. Kampusch's family included two adult sisters, and five nieces and nephews. Sirny and Koch separated while Kampusch was still a child and divorced after her abduction. Kampusch spent time with both of them, and had returned to her mother's home from a holiday with Koch the day before her kidnapping. At the time of her abduction, she was a student at the Brioschiweg primary school.

== Abduction ==
The 10-year-old Kampusch left her family's residence in Vienna's Donaustadt district on the morning of 2 March 1998, but failed to arrive at school or come home. A 12-year-old witness reported having seen her being dragged into a white minibus by two men, although Kampusch did not report a second man being present. A massive police effort followed in which 776 minivans were examined, including that of her kidnapper Přiklopil, who lived about half an hour from Vienna by car in the Lower Austrian town of Strasshof an der Nordbahn near Gänserndorf. He stated that he was alone at home on the morning of the kidnapping, and the police were satisfied with his explanation that he was using the minibus to transport rubble from the construction of his home.

Speculations arose of child pornography rings or organ theft, leading officials to also investigate possible links to the crimes of French serial killer Michel Fourniret. Kampusch had carried her passport with her when she left, as she had been on a family trip to Hungary a few days before, so the police extended the search abroad. Accusations against Kampusch's family complicated the issue even more.

=== Captivity ===
During the eight years of her captivity, Kampusch was held in a small cellar underneath Přiklopil's garage. A trap door in the garage led to a narrow flight of stairs to a basement room. The entrance to the cellar in which she was held was a small steel hatch concealed behind a cupboard. The room had no windows and was soundproof. For the first six months of her captivity, Kampusch was not allowed to leave the chamber at any time. Přiklopil controlled the lighting and electricity, at first leaving it on all the time, and he installed a two-way intercom through which he would give commands at random, something Kampusch likened to torture methods. However, Kampusch examined the intercom's three buttons and discovered the third button allowed her to silence his random orders. Přiklopil brought food, books, and rationed TV programming (one to two hours on the weekdays and two to four hours on the weekend). He did not come to the dungeon on weekends because, Kampusch learned later, his mother came for overnight visits.

In 2000, Kampusch had her first menstrual period and asked her captor for sanitary pads. She reported that everything changed after that, and "my childhood ended". He then began bringing her into the house more frequently and forcing her to meticulously clean. Přiklopil's house had been his parents' house and he wanted to renovate several rooms. Kampusch became his renovation worker. She describes Přiklopil forcing her to do difficult work well beyond her capabilities, such as dragging large slabs of stone and other heavy lifting and moving. He also forced her to do things like hand him tools, and if she handed him the wrong tool he became very angry. She became strong from this work and eventually gained the courage to physically strike Přiklopil, which was met with overpowering force. He began restricting her food and she became weaker.

She engaged in other quiet acts of resistance. Early in her captivity, Přiklopil demanded that she call him "maestro." She refused. Later, he demanded that she kneel in front of him, which she refused. He attempted to force her body into a kneeling position, but she resisted and he did not succeed in forcing her to kneel.

For several years of her captivity, she was not allowed to leave the tiny space at night. Afterward, she spent increasing amounts of time upstairs in the rest of the house, but each night was sent back to the chamber to sleep, as well as while Přiklopil was at work.

In later years, she was seen outside in the garden alone, and Přiklopil's business partner had said that Kampusch seemed relaxed and happy when he called at Přiklopil's home to borrow a trailer. After her 18th birthday, she was allowed to leave the house with Přiklopil, but he threatened to kill her if she attempted to escape or attract any attention. He later took her on a skiing trip to a resort near Vienna for a few hours. She initially denied that they had made the trip, but eventually admitted that it was true, although she said that no opportunities to escape had arisen during that time.

According to Kampusch's official statement after her escape, Přiklopil and she would get up early each morning to have breakfast together. Přiklopil gave her books, with which she educated herself. She did not feel that she had missed out on anything during her imprisonment, but she noted, "I spared myself many things, I did not start smoking or drinking and I did not hang out in bad company", but she also said, "It was a place to despair". She was given a television and radio to pass the time, although she was initially only allowed to watch taped programmes and listen to foreign radio stations so that she would not be aware of the publicised search for her. At one point, she tried to escape by jumping out of Přiklopil's car.

A large portion of Kampusch's time upstairs was spent doing housework and cooking for Přiklopil. Dietmar Ecker, Kampusch's media advisor, said that Přiklopil "would beat her so badly that she could hardly walk". He would also starve her to make her physically weak and unable to escape. He also raped her.

Přiklopil had warned Kampusch that the doors and windows of the house were booby-trapped with high explosives. He also claimed to be carrying a gun and that he would kill her and the neighbours if she attempted to escape. Nevertheless, Kampusch on one occasion fantasized about chopping his head off with an axe, although she quickly dismissed the idea. She also attempted to make noise during her early years of captivity by throwing bottles of water against the walls. She said that, when out in public with Přiklopil, she had unsuccessfully attempted to attract attention.

=== Escape ===
The 18-year-old Kampusch escaped from Přiklopil's house on 23 August 2006. At 12:53 pm, she was cleaning and vacuuming her kidnapper's white van in the garden when Přiklopil got a call on his mobile phone. Because of the vacuum's loud noise, he walked away to take the call. Kampusch left the vacuum cleaner running and ran away when Přiklopil was out of sight. She ran for some 200 metres (218 yards) through neighbouring gardens and a street, jumping fences, and asking bystanders to call the police, but they paid her no attention. After about five minutes, she knocked on the window of a 71-year-old neighbour known as Inge T, saying, "I am Natascha Kampusch". The neighbour called the police, who arrived at 1:04 pm. Later, Kampusch was taken to the police station in the town of Deutsch-Wagram.

Kampusch was identified by a scar on her body, by her passport (which was found in the room where she had been held), and by DNA tests. She was in good physical health, although she looked pale and shaken and weighed only 48 kg (106 lb); she had weighed 45 kg (99 lb) when she disappeared eight years earlier. Her body mass index reached as low as 14.8, outside the normal range of 18.5 to 24.9, and she grew only 15 cm (5.9 in) during her captivity.

=== Controversy ===
Ludwig Adamovich, head of a special commission looking into possible police failures in the investigation of the kidnapping, claimed that the time Kampusch was imprisoned "was always better than what she had known until then". This assessment was denied by Brigitta Sirny, and Adamovich's statement was in a news report by a criminal court; his defamation conviction was later overturned on appeal.

In Kampusch's 2010 book about her kidnapping, 3,096 Days, she stated that her parents slapped her, and that she was considering suicide on the day of her abduction. However, Kampusch asserted that her mother was not abusive and that her home life was better than life in captivity.

== Kidnapper ==
Wolfgang Přiklopil ([ˈvɔlfɡaŋ ˈpr̝ɪklopɪl]; 14 May 1962 – 23 August 2006) was an Austrian communications technician. He was born to Karl and Waltraud Přiklopil in Vienna, and was their only child. His father was a traveling cognac salesman and his mother was a shoe saleswoman. Přiklopil worked at Siemens for a time as a communications technician. His father died when he was in his 20s. He spoke "often and admiringly of Hitler" and his contemporary political hero was Jörg Haider of Austria's Freedom Party, had the book Mein Kampf by Adolf Hitler on his shelf, and when the 9/11 attacks happened, he took pleasure in the attacks on the "conspiracy of global Jewish dominance."

Přiklopil fled in his red BMW sports car that was later found in a Vienna car park; knowing that the police were after him, he died by suicide that night by jumping in front of an oncoming train near the Wien Nord station in Vienna. He had apparently planned all along to end his own life rather than be caught, having told Kampusch, "they would not catch [him] alive".

Evidence recovery was complicated, as Přiklopil's only computer was a 1980s Commodore 64, which is incompatible with modern-day data recovery software. Before Kampusch escaped, Přiklopil was trying to procure false papers as a Czech citizen to "begin a new life" with Kampusch.

== Aftermath ==
In her official statement, Kampusch said, "I don't want and will not answer any questions about personal or intimate details". After Kampusch's escape, police investigated whether Přiklopil had an accomplice, but they eventually determined that he acted alone.

Kampusch sympathized with her captor in the documentary Natascha Kampusch: 3096 days in captivity. She said, "I feel more and more sorry for him – he's a poor soul". According to police, she "cried inconsolably" when she was told that he was dead; she had developed feelings for him and she lit a candle for him at the morgue. She has, however, referred to her captor as a "criminal".

Newspapers quoting unnamed psychologists suggested that Kampusch might suffer from Stockholm syndrome, but Kampusch says that this is not the case. She suggests that people who use this term about her are disrespectful of her and do not allow her the right to describe and analyze the complex relationship that she had with her kidnapper in her own words.

=== Interviews ===
After reportedly "hundreds of requests for an interview" with the teenager, "with media outlets offering vast sums of money", Kampusch was interviewed by Austrian public broadcaster ORF. The interview was broadcast on 6 September 2006 with her approval. ORF did not pay a fee for its interview but agreed to forward any proceeds from selling the interview to other channels, forecasted to total 300,000 euros, to be donated to women in Africa and Mexico by Kampusch. Likewise, she was planning projects to help these women. Interest was enormous.

The newspaper Kronen Zeitung and newsweekly News also interviewed Kampusch. The interview was published on 6 September 2006. Both press interviews were given in return for a package including housing support, a long-term job offer, and help with her education.

On 16 June 2008, the newspaper The Times published an in-depth interview with Kampusch by Bojan Pancevski and Stefanie Marsh.

On 17 February 2010, the British TV channel Channel 5 broadcast an hour-long documentary about the case, including an exclusive interview with Kampusch: Natascha: The Girl in the Cellar.

=== Books ===
The book Girl in the Cellar: The Natascha Kampusch Story by Allan Hall and Michael Leidig appeared in November 2006, written in English. Kampusch's lawyer described the book as being both speculative and premature and therefore planned to take legal action against it.

Together with two journalists, Kampusch's mother Brigitta Sirny wrote a book about the ordeal, Verzweifelte Jahre ('Desperate Years'). Kampusch appeared at the initial presentation of the book in August 2007, but did not want to be photographed or interviewed. Sirny writes that she did not have much contact with Kampusch after the escape because her daughter was shielded from the outside world.

Kampusch wrote a book about her ordeal, 3096 Tage (3096 Days), published in September 2010. It was adapted into a movie, 3096 Days, in 2013.

On 12 August 2016, Natascha Kampusch released 10 Years of Freedom, her second book.

=== Film adaptations ===
On 17 June 2010, German film-maker and director Bernd Eichinger announced that he was making a film based on Kampusch's captivity and wanted Kate Winslet to star in the film. The film was Eichinger's last before his sudden death on 24 January 2011; Kampusch attended his funeral.

In 2011, the Austrian film Michael, which has a plot that resembles the Natascha Kampusch case, was released.

On 15 April 2012, German newspaper Welt am Sonntag reported that the film would feature Antonia Campbell-Hughes as Kampusch and Thure Lindhardt as Přiklopil. Ruth Toma completed Eichinger's unfinished screenplay and the film was directed by Sherry Hormann. It was also cinematographer Michael Ballhaus's final film. The film 3096 Days (3096 Tage) was released on 28 February 2013.

=== Media endeavors ===
Kampusch established her own website containing personal information including pictures of herself on 5 December 2007. She had her own talk show on the Austrian TV channel, Puls 4, starting on 1 June 2008. The show had the working title of In Conversation with... Natascha Kampusch and eventually premiered as Natascha Kampusch trifft ('Natascha Kampusch meets...'). It ran for three episodes.

=== House ===
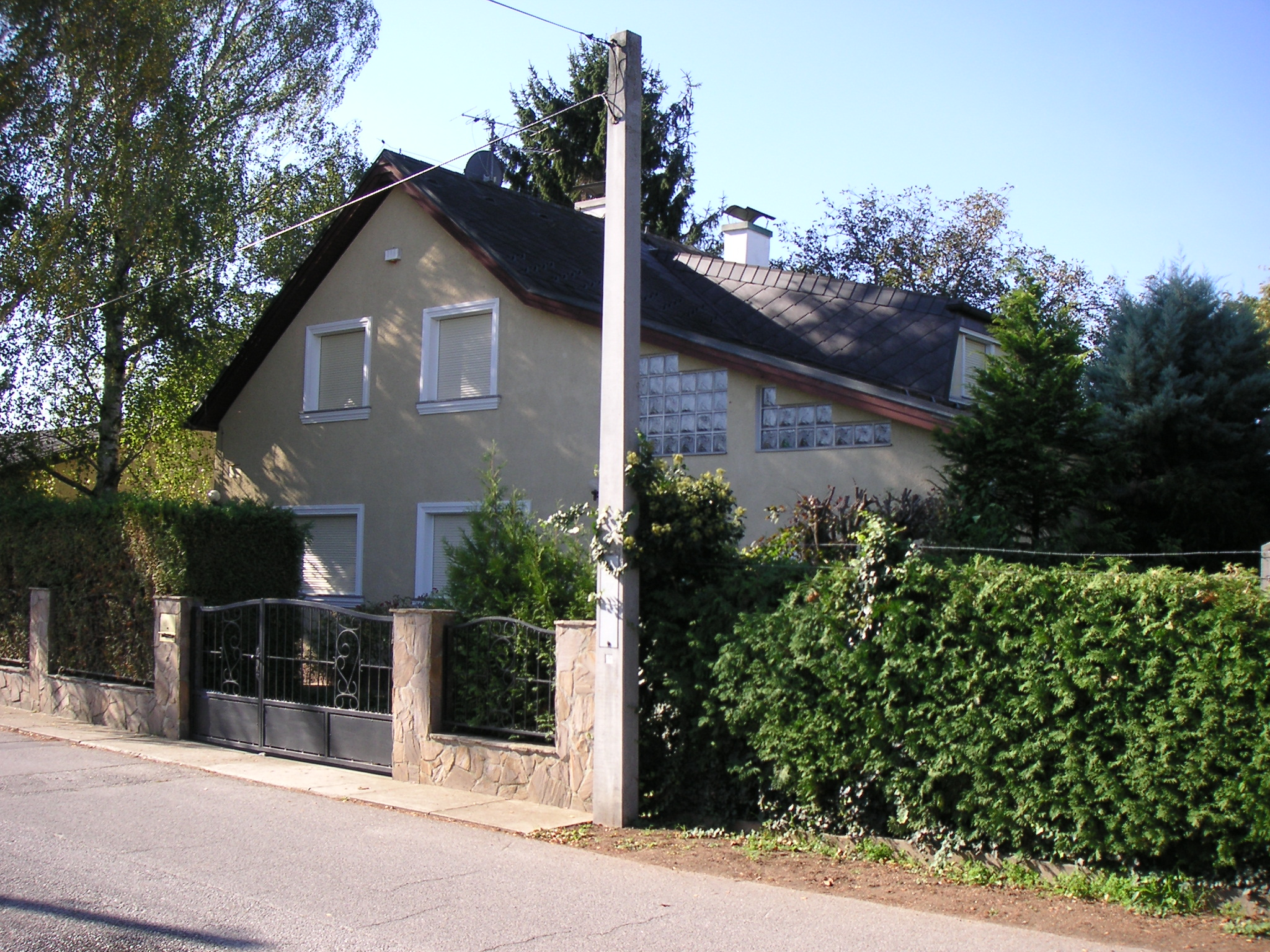
Wolfgang Přiklopil's house in Strasshof, where Kampusch was held captive

The house where Kampusch was imprisoned was built by Přiklopil's grandfather, Oskar Přiklopil, after World War II. During the Cold War period, Oskar and his son Karl built a bomb shelter, thought to be the origin of Kampusch's cellar prison. Přiklopil took over the house in 1984 following his grandmother's death.

Kampusch now owns the house in which she was imprisoned. It was reported that she claimed the house from Přiklopil's estate because she wanted to protect it from vandals and being torn down; she also noted that she has visited it since her escape. When the third anniversary of her escape approached, it was revealed she had become a regular visitor at the property and was cleaning it out.

In January 2010, Kampusch said she had retained the house because it was such a big part of her formative years, also stating that she would fill in the cellar if it is ever sold, adamant that it will never become a macabre museum to her lost adolescence. In 2011, the cellar was filled in; as of 2017 Kampusch still owned the house.

== See also ==
- Fritzl case, which also happened in Austria
- Kidnapping of Jaycee Dugard
- Kidnapping of Elizabeth Smart
- List of kidnappings (1990–1999)
- List of solved missing person cases (1990s)
