= Jean Mercer =

American developmental psychologist

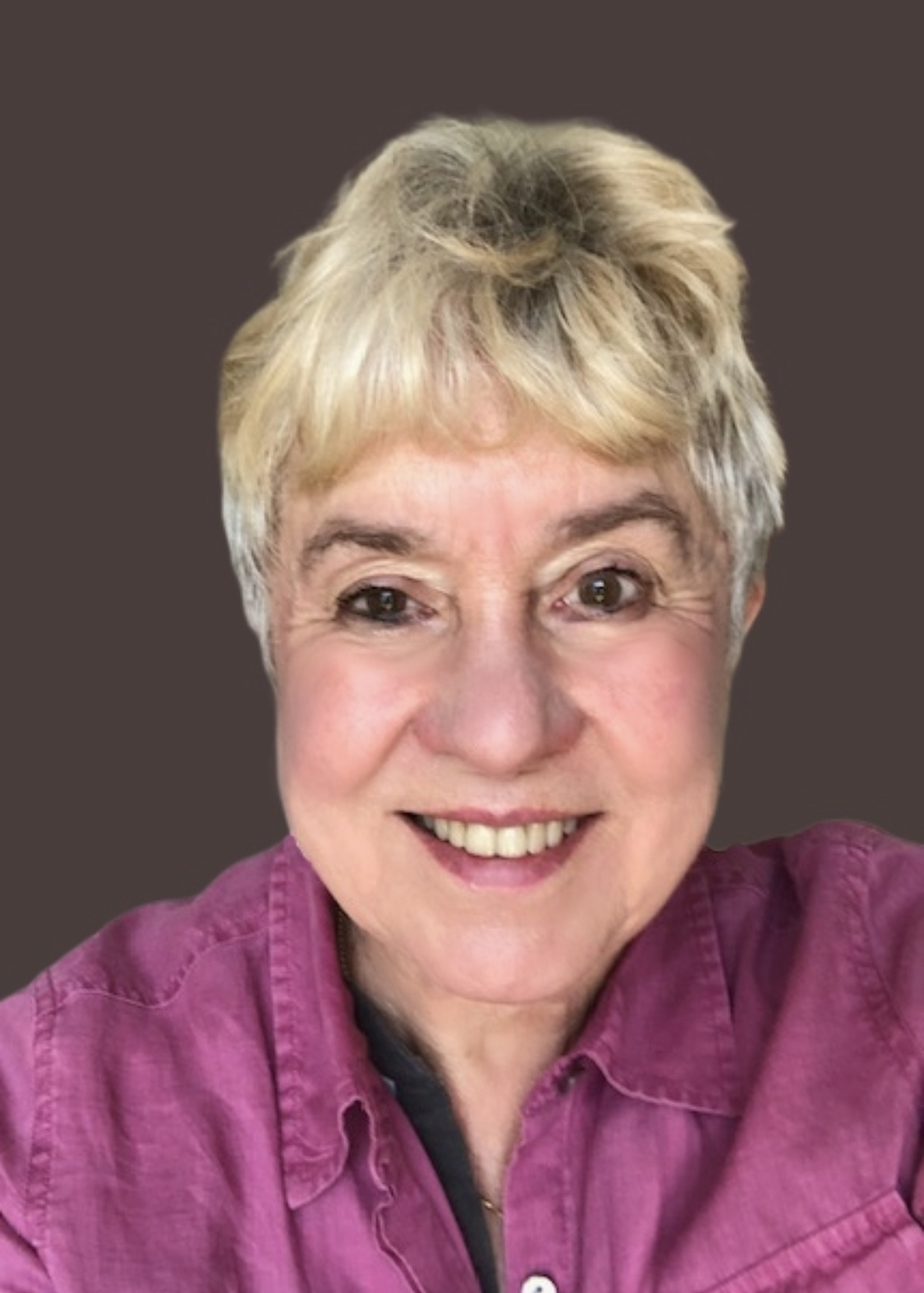
- Education: Brandeis University
- Scientific career
- Fields: Developmental psychology
- Workplaces: Stockton University

Jean Mercer is an American developmental psychologist and professor emerita of psychology at Stockton University. Founder of the advocacy group Advocates for Children in Therapy, she is known as an advocate for adopted children and those who come from the foster care system, and as an outspoken critic of attachment therapy.

Mercer is the author of several books, including Thinking critically about child development: examining myths and misunderstandings. Mercer's articles on attachment disorder, harmful psychological treatments and other mental health issues have been published in peer-reviewed journals. She has presented at conferences internationally, made television appearances, served as editor for an industry newsletter, and authors two blogs, Childmyths and The Study of Nonsense.

== Education ==
Mercer attended Mount Holyoke College in South Hadley, Massachusetts, from 1959 to 1961. She received a BA in psychology from Occidental College in Los Angeles, California, in 1963. In February 1968, she was awarded a Ph.D. in psychology from Brandeis University in Waltham, Massachusetts.

== Career ==
From September 1967 to June 1969, Mercer held the position of assistant professor at Wheaton College in Norton, Massachusetts. From there, she moved to Buffalo, New York, to serve as assistant professor at State University College, a position she held for two years before taking an assistant professorship at Richard Stockton College (now Stockton University) in Pomona, New Jersey, in September 1974. Mercer remained at the college, attaining a full professorship in 1981, until her retirement in 2006. She is currently professor emerita of psychology at Stockton University.

Mercer is a developmental psychologist who has spent much of her career as an advocate for evidence-based therapy techniques, particularly for children who are adopted or come from the foster care system. She is an outspoken critic of RAD therapies (also known as attachment therapy, rebirthing, compression or coercive restraint therapy) which, she says, are "completely contrary to mainstream medical practice" and are used without empirical support for their efficacy. These therapies, according to Mercer, involve techniques such as restricting food, restraining children so they cannot move and forcing them to do meaningless, difficult chores as punishment, and are practiced by people who "mistakenly equate obedience with attachment." In 2003, Mercer co-wrote Attachment Therapy on Trial: The Torture and Death of Candace Newmaker, with Larry W. Sarner and Linda A. Rosa. The book is an in-depth exploration into the suffocation of Candace Newmaker, a 10-year-old Colorado girl, during one such session.

Mercer was a consulting reader for articles that appeared in the journal Infants and Young Children (1992–2000), editor for the New Jersey Association for Infant Mental Health's newsletter, The Phoenix (1994–1999), and contributor and consulting editor for the Scientific Review of Mental Health Practice, a journal published by the Center for Inquiry.

== Major works ==
=== Child Development: Myths and Misunderstandings ===
In Child Development: Myths and Misunderstandings, published by SAGE, Mercer provides readers with 51 essays that challenge or dispel common misconceptions about child development, starting with infancy and moving through the teen years. Mercer makes a distinction among myths (stories we tell ourselves), mistakes (erroneous information) and misunderstandings (misinterpretation of information) that influence how people interpret research involving child development. Topics addressed in the book include: vaccination and autism, sugar and hyperactivity, punishment and changing children's behavior, high-self esteem and student achievement, sudden infant death syndrome, and violence in video games. Mercer also discusses research findings from psychology that were current at the time the book was published, as well as "major gaps in knowledge" that needed further study.

The book is intended to help readers (parents, college students) challenge assumptions rooted in their own childhood experiences and develop critical thinking skills for determining fact from conjecture. Discussion questions, provided after each exposed myth, help with this process.

In its 3rd edition, the book was re-titled Thinking critically about child development: examining myths and misunderstandings.

=== Understanding Attachment: Parenting, Child Care, and Emotional Development ===
In Understanding Attachment: Parenting, Child Care, and Emotional Development, published by Praeger, Mercer provides readers with an historical overview of attachment and makes a distinction between "the notion of attachment in many popular theories of parenting" and the "meaning of attachment in developmental psychology." Based on empirical research, Mercer offers insight into attachment issues for children of varying ages (e.g., secure-base behavior, separation anxiety, negotiation of separation) and makes recommendations for creating "attachment friendly" environments for parents (biological or adoptive) and day care providers.

== Bibliography ==
=== Books ===
- Attachment Therapy on Trial: The Torture and Death of Candace Newmaker, with Larry W. Sarner and Linda A. Rosa (Praeger, 2003) ISBN 978-0-275-97675-0
- Understanding Attachment: Parenting, Child Care, and Emotional Development (Praeger, 2005) ISBN 978-0-275-98217-1
- Child Development: Myths and Misunderstandings (Sage, 2nd edition, 2013) ISBN 978-1-452-21768-0
- Alternative Psychotherapies: Evaluating Unconventional Mental Health Treatments (2014) ISBN 978-1-442-23491-8
- Someone Said Parental Alienation (2025) ISBN 978-1032594583

=== Selected articles ===
- 'Attachment therapy' using deliberate restraint: an object lesson on the identification of unvalidated treatments (2001)
- Attachment therapy: a treatment without empirical support
- Child psychotherapy involving physical restraint: techniques used in four approaches (2002)
- Snake oil, ethics, and the First Amendment: what's a profession to do? (2002)
- Violent therapies: the rationale behind a potentially harmful child psychotherapy
- Coercive restraint therapies: a dangerous alternative mental health intervention (2005)
- Behaving Yourself: Moral Development in the Secular Family, an essay in Parenting Beyond Belief: On Raiding Ethical, Caring Kids Without Religion, Dale McGowan (editor) (AMACON, 2007)
- Destructive trends in alternative infant mental health approaches (2007)
- Custody evaluations, attachment theory, and an attachment measure: the science remains limited (2009)
- Attachment theory and its vicissitudes: toward an updated theory (2011)
- The concept of psychological regression: metaphors, mapping, Queen Square, and Tavistock Square (2011)
- Some aspects of CAM mental health interventions: regression, recapitulation, and 'secret sympathies' (2011)
- Deliverance, demonic possession, and mental illness: some considerations for mental health professionals (2012)
- Evidence of Potentially Harmful Psychological Treatments for Children and Adolescents (2017)
- Are intensive parental alienation treatments effective and safe for children and adolescents? (2019)

== Notable appearances ==
=== Television ===
- The US is becoming more and more supporters of "Attachment Therapy," OneTV, Moscow, Russia (March 3, 2013)
- Attachment Therapy & Russian Adoptees in the USA, Russian Television (February 21, 2013)

=== Presentations ===
- "Novel unsupported therapies: pseudoscientific and cult-like characteristics," with M. Pignotti and JD Herbert, International Cultic Studies Conference, Philadelphia, PA (2008)
- "Attachment theory, evidence-based practice, and rogue therapies: using and misusing the concept of attachment," with LA Rosa, RS Pennington, LW Sarner, Wisconsin School Psychology Association, La Crosse, Wisconsin (October 29, 2008)
- Testimony, US House of Representatives, Committee on Ways and Means, Subcommittee on Human Resources (with LW Sarner), November 20, 2003
- "Unconventional Psychotherapies: Some Questions About Their History," Eastern Psychological Association, Cambridge, MA (2011)
- "Fetal Psychology in Psychohistory: Where it Came From, Where it Went," Eastern Psychological Association, New,(2013)
- "Jirina Prekopova's holding therapy: Scientifically founded or otherwise?," Conference of the International Working Group on Abuse in Child Psychotherapy, London (2013)

== Professional societies ==
- American Psychological Association
- Institute for Science in Medicine (Founding member)
- New Jersey Association for Infant Mental Health (1996–2009)
- New Jersey Better Baby Care Campaign Advisory Committee (2002–2003)
- Pennsylvania Association for Infant Mental Health
- Society for Research in Child Development
