= Jirina Prekop =

Czech psychologist and science writer (1929–2020)

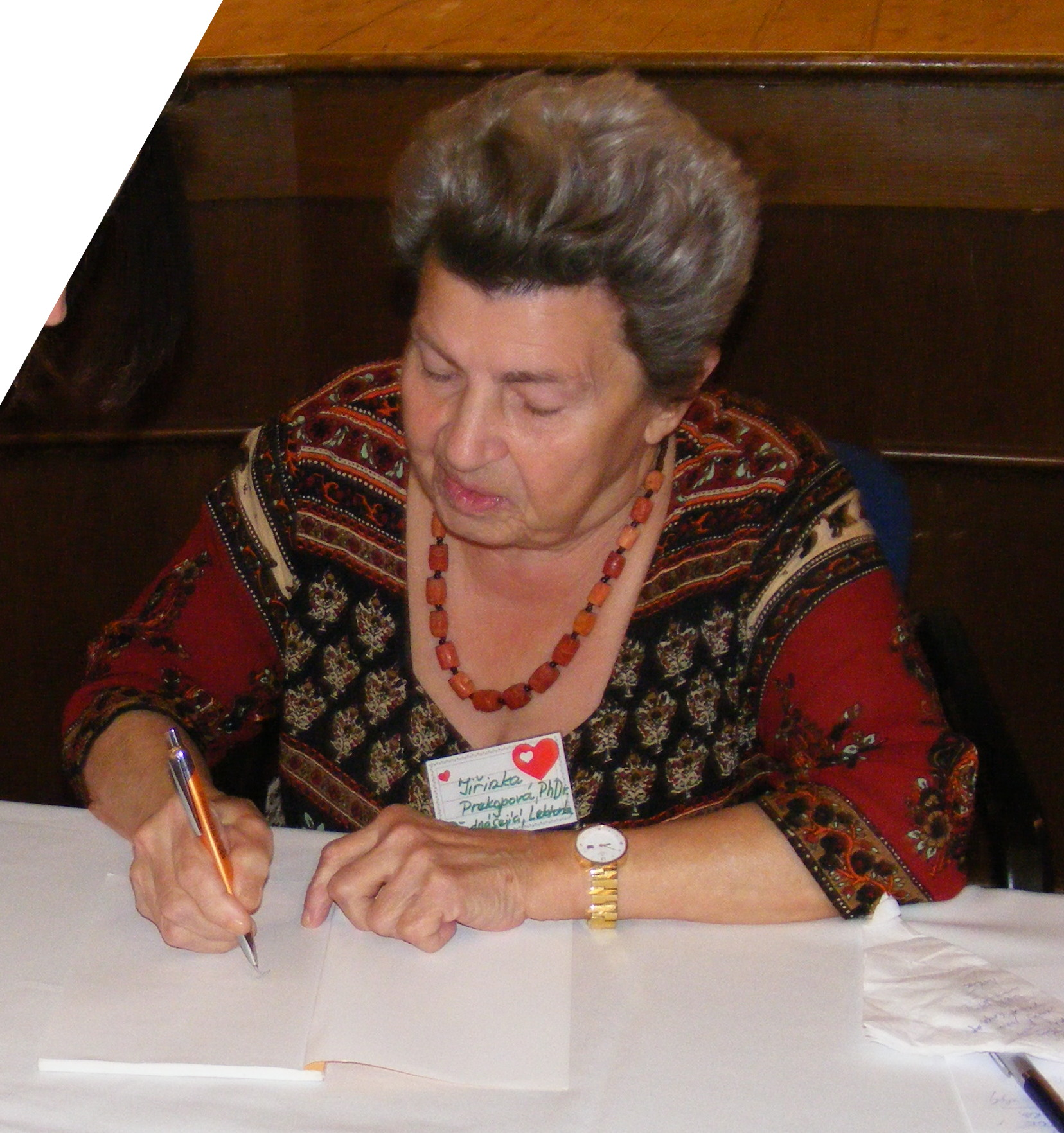
Jirina Prekop

PhDr. Jirina Prekop, born Jiřina Prekopová (14 October 1929, Olomouc or Prostějov, Czechoslovakia - 7 September 2020, Prague, Czech Republic) was a Czech psychologist and an author of children psychology and education literature, living and writing in Germany.

== Life ==
Jirina Prekop left Czechoslovakia in 1970 after studying psychology, philosophy and education to settle in Germany. She worked as a psychologist in Olgahospital in Stuttgart.

She also lived in Lindau and before her death she also stayed back in the Czech Republic's capital, Prague.

== Work ==
Jirina Prekop is an author to 15 books that were translated into more than 20 languages. She was also a guest to many interviews in magazines, radio and TV.

One of the most discussed topics, of which she was a propagator, was a so-called Holding therapy. The original idea comes from Martha Welch, an American psychologist. It is a psychotherapy method saying that it is possible for two people, close family members, to hold each other for as long as it is necessary for them to solve their conflict, which is impossible to solve in words, by hugging each other so tight and for so long until the love flows again between them.

This method was and is widely disputed. Especially after a death of a 10-year-old Candace Newmaker who was suffocated to death during a 70minute Attachment Therapy session. Those theories have a common root but they are meant for solving different problems - while the Attachment Therapy is meant for adopted or foster children, Prekop's work focuses primarily on family members (mainly children and partners).
