= Child of Rage =

1992 television film directed by Larry Peerce

- UK VHS cover
- Genre: Biography; Drama; Mystery
- Based on: Childhood of Beth Thomas
- Written by: Phil Penningroth; Suzette Couture
- Directed by: Larry Peerce
- Starring: Mel Harris; Dwight Schultz; Ashley Peldon; Rosanna DeSoto; Sam Gifaldi; Mariette Hartley
- Theme music composer: Gerald Gouriet
- Country of origin: United States
- Original language: English

Production
- Executive producers: Chuck McLain; Christy Welker
- Producer: David Shepherd
- Production location: Vancouver
- Cinematography: Tony Imi
- Editor: Susan B. Browdy
- Running time: 94 minutes
- Production companies: Gillian Productions; C.M. Two Production; Republic Television

Original release
- Network: CBS
- Release: September 29, 1992

Child of Rage is a 1992 American biographical drama television film directed by Larry Peerce, starring Mel Harris, Dwight Schultz, Ashley Peldon and Mariette Hartley. The film is based on the true story of Beth Thomas, who had severe behavioral problems as a result of being sexually abused as a child. The film was shot in Vancouver, British Columbia, Canada, with classroom scenes being filmed at Mary Hill Elementary School. It premiered on CBS on Tuesday, September 29, 1992.

The music in the introduction is from the library music album The Music Box, by Alain Debray and Derek Austin.

== Plot ==
Jill Tyler and her minister husband Rob Tyler adopt two children, Catherine and Eric. Eric is a sweet and timid child. Catherine, nicknamed "Cat", initially seems to be the same but soon displays outbursts of violent rage for no apparent reason. At first, some of her violent acts go unnoticed; when they progress to stabbing the family dog with a needle, Jill and Rob realize something is wrong. They ask Doris, the children's caseworker, about Catherine's past, but Doris cites confidentiality laws.

Following a disturbing incident where Catherine tries to seduce her adoptive grandfather, Jill and Rob take her to a psychologist; she puts on a good show and convinces the doctor that nothing is wrong. Later, Jill notices bruises on Eric, and he admits that it was Catherine who inflicted them. Catherine later smashes Eric's head on the concrete basement floor, landing him in the emergency room.

Doris finally admits the truth about the children's past: after receiving a concerned phone call, she rescued the children from an abusive home, which was one of the worst she'd seen. Although Eric was in bad shape, Catherine was in a worse condition. No adults were present when they were found: their mother was hospitalized with pneumonia, while their father was apparently off on a drunken bender.

Doris reveals that the children have an older sister named Stephanie, whom she and Jill track down at a topless bar. Stephanie, a bitter young woman, has a harrowing story: she was sexually abused by her father as a child, and after she began fighting back, he turned his attention to Catherine, who was a baby at the time. This explains Catherine's violent behavior.

After another incident in which Catherine cuts a classmate with glass, Doris reveals to Jill and Rob that she had previously moved the children from foster home to foster home, hoping that something would work for them. She gives the couple a book called Kids Who Kill. Jill feels that it is a perfect description of Catherine. At this point, Doris suggests a controversial treatment for Catherine: holding therapy, which is practiced by the book's author, Dr. Rosemary Myers. Rob feels that Catherine is a lost cause and suggests they just keep Eric, but Jill insists that they should help Catherine.

Dr. Myers examines Catherine. Although she initially puts on the same act that she used for the last therapist, she is undone by Dr. Myers's use of reverse psychology, which causes her to admit her violent acts. Dr. Myers explains that Catherine is sick, and the lack of bonding left her with an attachment disorder. During their first holding therapy session (which involves Jill, Rob, and Dr. Myers holding Catherine down while Dr. Myers deliberately provokes her rage), things start out well, but Jill senses it's going too far. Dr. Myers reminds Jill that she needs to trust her, and the session resumes, ending successfully after an enraged Catherine admits a desire to re-enact her past acts of violence with the three of them, giving them a glimpse of the pain underneath her rage. While the procedure normally takes place over a 6-week period, Dr. Myers realizes that Jill and Rob need to get home to Eric, who is in his grandparents' care, and believes the couple can successfully conduct the sessions at home.

Shortly before they return home, another disturbed child named Justin starts a fire at the hotel. Left alone, Catherine panics, culminating in an incident where she tries to stab Rob but is caught in the nick of time. Returning home, the couple discusses the prospect of being separated from one another to give Catherine individual bonding time with each parent to allow her to heal. As the two have another holding therapy session with Catherine, a breakthrough occurs: Catherine starts to cry, Jill does the same, and Catherine attempts to comfort her. The film ends with Catherine telling Jill and Rob that she loves them and the three tearfully embrace.

== Cast ==
- Mel Harris as Jill Tyler
- Dwight Schultz as Rob Tyler
- Ashley Peldon as Catherine "Cat" Tyler
- Sam Gifaldi as Eric Tyler
- Rosanna DeSoto as Doris Hanna
- Nan Martin as Barbara Tyler
- George D. Wallace as Henry Tyler
- Mariette Hartley as Dr. Rosemary Myers
- Johannah Newmarch as Stephanie
- Patricia Gage as Laurel
- Terence Kelly as Mike
- Kim Kondrashoff as Catherine's biological father

== Documentary ==
Prior to the film's release, a 1990 documentary entitled Child of Rage: A Story of Abuse was produced by Gaby Monet based on interviews conducted with the film's real-life inspiration, Beth Thomas. It aired on HBO as part of their America Undercover series. The film consists of interviews with Beth Thomas by a therapist (Ken Magid), followed by footage of her treatment and partial recovery at a treatment center for children. The documentary was released shortly after Magid's book High Risk: Children Without A Conscience, which portrays children with reactive attachment disorder (as Thomas is labelled in the film) as "murderous psychopaths", contrary to its actual definition in the Diagnostic and Statistical Manual of Mental Disorders fourth edition.

Beth Thomas's adopted mother Nancy Thomas has been a leading proponent of "attachment therapy" (originally known as "Rage reduction therapy"; hence the title) since the documentary was made, a highly controversial form of psychotherapy regarded by the American Medical Association as pseudoscientific and abusive. Beth Thomas, a former patient of the "Attachment therapist" Connell Watkins, would later—as a freshman—testify on Watkins's behalf in the Candace Newmaker trial, where Watkins was convicted of child abuse for administering "rebirthing" therapy which caused the asphyxiation of her "patient". Thomas has since graduated from the University of Colorado with a bachelor's degree in Nursing and become an award-winning Flagstaff Medical Center Registered Nurse.

== See also ==
- List of films featuring psychopaths and sociopaths
