= Dyadic developmental psychotherapy =

Medical treatment for children with emotional disorders

Dyadic developmental psychotherapy is a psychotherapeutic treatment method for families that have children with symptoms of emotional disorders, including complex trauma and disorders of attachment. It was originally developed by Arthur Becker-Weidman and Daniel Hughes as an intervention for children whose emotional distress resulted from earlier separation from familiar caregivers. Hughes cites attachment theory and particularly the work of John Bowlby as theoretical motivations for dyadic developmental psychotherapy.

Dyadic developmental therapy principally involves creating a "playful, accepting, curious, and empathic" environment in which the therapist attunes to the child's "subjective experiences" and reflects this back to the child by means of eye contact, facial expressions, gestures and movements, voice tone, timing and touch, "co-regulates" emotional affect and "co-constructs" an alternative autobiographical narrative with the child. Dyadic developmental psychotherapy also makes use of cognitive-behavioral strategies. The "dyad" referred to must eventually be the parent-child dyad. The active presence of the primary caregiver is preferred but not required.

A study by Arthur Becker-Weidman in 2006, which suggested that dyadic developmental therapy is more effective than the "usual treatment methods" for reactive attachment disorder and complex trauma, has been criticised by the American Professional Society on the Abuse of Children (APSAC). According to the APSAC Taskforce Report and Reply, dyadic developmental psychotherapy does not meet the criteria for designation as "evidence based" nor provide a basis for conclusions about "usual treatment methods". A 2006 research synthesis described the approach as a "supported and acceptable" treatment, but this conclusion has also proved controversial. A 2013 review of research recommended caution about this method of therapy, arguing that it has "no support for claims of effectiveness at any level of evidence" and a questionable theoretical basis.

== Theoretical basis ==
Dyadic developmental psychotherapy grounded in Bowlby's attachment theory and is based on the theory that maltreated infants not only frequently have disorganized attachments but also, as they mature, are likely to develop rigid self-reliance that becomes a compulsive need to control all aspects of their environment. Hughes cites Lyons-Ruth & Jacobvitz (1999) in support of this theory. Caregivers are seen as a source of fear with the result that children endeavour to control their caregivers through manipulation, overcompliance, intimidation or role reversal in order to keep themselves safe. Such children may also suffer intrusive memories secondary to trauma and as a result may be reluctant or unwilling to participate in treatment. It is anticipated that such children will try to actively avoid the exposure involved in developing a therapeutic relationship and will resist being directed into areas of shame and trauma. Hughes proposes that an attachment based treatment may be more effective for such foster and adoptive children than traditional treatment and parenting interventions.

It is stated that once an infant's safety needs are met (by attachment) they become more able to focus on learning and responding to the social and emotional needs of caregivers. (Schore, 2003ab). Hughes posits that this 'affective attunement', described by Stern (1985) is crucial in the development of both a secure attachment as well as a positive, integrated sense of self. Attunement is primarily a non-verbal mode of communication between infant and carer, and in synchrony in the degree of arousal being expressed, as well as with empathy for the child's internal experience. Hughes states "Whether it is a motivational system separate from attachment as is suggested by Stern (2004), or a central aspect of a secure attachment dyad, it remains vital in the child's overall development."

The therapy attempts to replicate this or fill in the gaps in a maltreated child's experience.

== Methods ==
Firstly the therapist becomes 'non-verbally attuned' with the child's affective state. The therapist then attempts to explore 'themes' with the child whilst remaining attuned. Whilst this is done, the therapist then 'co-regulates' (helps the child to manage) the child's emerging affective states with 'matched vitality affect', and develops secondary affective/mental representations of them which is co-constructed with the child for purposes of integration (the therapist tries to help the child gain a coherent narrative about their experiences and an awareness of the positive aspects of themselves). According to Hughes "The therapist allows the subjective experience of the child to impact the therapist. The therapist can then truly enter into that experience and from there express her/his own subjective experience. As the therapist holds both subjective experiences, the child experiences both. As the child senses both, the child begins to integrate them and re-experience the event in a way that will facilitate its integration and resolution." In the anticipated frequent disruptions, due to the child's traumatic and shaming experiences, the therapist accepts and works with these and then 'repairs' the relationship.

The aim is for the child to be able to construct a new and coherent autobiography that enables the child to be in touch with their inner feelings. "As the therapist gives expression to the child's subjective narrative, s/he is continuously integrating the child's nonverbal responsiveness to the dialogue, modifying it spontaneously in a manner congruent with the child's expressions. The dialogue is likely to have more emotional meaning for the child if the therapist, periodically, speaks for the child in the first person with the child's own words." (Hughes 2004 p. 18) The active presence of one of the child's primary caregivers is considered to greatly enhance psychological treatment. However Hughes considers that attachment based treatment can be undertaken with just the therapist.(Hughes 2004 p. 25)

== Controversy ==
DDP has been criticised for the lack of a comprehensive manual or full case studies to provide details of the process. Its theoretical basis has also been questioned. Although non-verbal communication, communicative mismatch and repair, playful interactions and the relationship between the parents' attachment status and that of a toddler are all well documented and important for early healthy emotional development, Hughes and Becker-Weidman are described as making "a real logical jump" in assuming that the same events can be deliberately recapitulated in order to correct the emotional condition of an older child.

Similarities to certain attachment therapy practices have also provoked controversy. It has been suggested that the therapy appears to use age regression and holding techniques—features of attachment therapy not congruent with attachment theory. Becker-Weidman cites Daniel Hughes's 1997 book "Facilitating Developmental Attachment", which contains sections on the use of age regression and holding therapy, as a source document for dyadic developmental psychotherapy. The advocacy group Advocates for Children in Therapy include dyadic developmental psychotherapy in their list of "attachment therapies by another name", and continue to list Hughes as a proponent of attachment therapy, citing statements of his that appear to endorse holding therapy. In particular, they cite material from Hughes's website about the use of physical contact in therapy. However a recent academic study found that, "Such practices were not reported by any of the parents" who took part in the study, "and indeed many identified DDP as being child-led, meeting the needs of their family with good results and in a climate of safety."

The APSAC Taskforce report on attachment disorder, reactive attachment disorder and attachment therapy, published in 2006, places Hughes and Becker-Weidman within the attachment therapy paradigm and indeed specifically cites Becker-Weidman for, amongst other things, the use of age regression, though not for coercive or restraining practices (p. 79). They also describe DDP as an attachment therapy in their November 2006 Reply to Letters. Becker-Weidman had stated in his letter to the Taskforce that it was essential to treat a child at its developmental rather than chronological level, but the Taskforce in its November 2006 Reply to Letters disagreed (p. 382).

The Taskforce in their Reply to Letters describe Hughes as "a leading attachment therapist" and cite Hughes (together with Kelly and Popper) as examples of attachment therapists who have more recently developed their practices away from the more concerning attachment therapy techniques (p. 383).

The Kansas University/SRS Best Practices Report (2004) considered that dyadic developmental psychotherapy as described by Becker-Weidman, appeared to be somewhat different from that as described by Hughes. They state that in 2004 Becker-Weidman's claim that dyadic developmental psychotherapy was "evidence based" cited studies on holding therapy by Myeroff, Randolph and Levy from the Attachment Center at Evergreen. Hughes' model is described as more clearly incorporating researched concerns about 'pushing' children to revisit trauma (as this can re-traumatize victims) and as having integrated established principles of trauma treatment into his approach. Avoiding dysregulation is described by Hughes as a primary treatment goal.

Prior and Glaser state that Hughes's therapy 'reads' as good therapy for abused and neglected children, though with 'little application of attachment theory', but do not include it in their section on attachment therapy.

Trowell, while admiring Hughes's clinical skills, stated that "Parents and carers need their own specific parent work and the children and young people need specific work tailored to their needs ... parents with their own unmet attachment needs from childhood may significantly inhibit their ability to speak frankly with, and feel supported by professionals aiming to help their children". Referring to the use of facial expressions in attempts at attunement, Trowell noted, "although the therapist may look and feel sad, the young person may see this as a provocation—either hit out or the therapist may be perceived to be triumphant (the facial expression may be misread)" (p. 281). Trowell emphasized the value of many of Hughes's ideas for clinical work, but she concluded that "There is a need for caution. Experienced, well-trained clinicians can, with supervision, take these ideas forward into their clinical practice. But the ideas in [Hughes's 2004 paper] do not provide a sufficient basis for a treatment manual, and are not to be followed uncritically."

== Evidence ==
Two research reports by Becker-Weidman, the second being a four-year follow-up of the first, are the only empirical examination of dyadic developmental psychotherapy. They reported DDP to be an effective treatment for children with complex trauma who met the DSM IV criteria for reactive attachment disorder. The first report concluded that children who received dyadic developmental psychotherapy had clinically and statistically significant improvements in their functioning as measured by the Child Behavior Checklist, while the children in the control group showed no change one year after treatment ended. The study also used the Randolph Attachment Disorder Questionnaire as a measure, which has not been empirically validated for reactive attachment disorder. Statistical comparisons were performed using multiple t-tests rather than an analysis of variance; this has been criticized because t-tests increase the chance of finding any significant differences.

The treatment group comprised thirty-four subjects whose cases were closed in 2000/01. This was compared to a "usual care group" of thirty subjects, who were treated elsewhere. The published reports on this work do not specify the nature of "usual care" or clarify why the "usual care" group, who were assessed at Becker-Weidman's clinic, did not have treatment there. Treatment consisted of an average of 23 sessions over eleven months. The findings continued for an average of 1.1 years after treatment ended for children between the ages of six and fifteen years. There were no changes in the usual care-group subjects, who were re-tested an average of 1.3 years after the evaluation was completed.

In the follow-up study the results from the original study were maintained an average of 3.9 years after treatment ended. There were no changes in the usual care-group subjects, who were re-tested an average of 3.3 years after the evaluation was completed.

Becker-Weidman's first study was considered by the APSAC Taskforce in their November 2006 Reply to Letters following their main report on attachment therapy. The Taskforce had in their original report criticised Becker-Weidman for claiming an evidence base to his therapy, and indeed for claiming to be the only evidence based therapy, where the Taskforce considered no evidence base existed. Becker-Weidman responded to this with an open letter citing his study. The Taskforce examined the (2006) study, criticized the methodology and stated that although the study was an important first step towards learning the facts about DDP outcomes, it fell far short of the criteria that must be met before designating a treatment as evidence based.

Between the Taskforce report and Reply to Letters, Craven & Lee (2006) undertook a literature review of 18 studies of interventions used for foster children and classified them under the controversial Saunders, Berliner, & Hanson (2004) system. They considered only two therapies aimed at treating disorders of attachment, each of which was represented by a single study: dyadic developmental psychotherapy and holding therapy. They placed both in Category 3 as "supported and acceptable". This classification means that the evidence basis is weak, but that there is no evidence of harm done by the treatment. The Craven & Lee classification report has been criticized as unduly favourable. This critique noted the absence of a comprehensive manual giving details of the dyadic developmental psychotherapy intervention—one of the necessary criteria for assessment using the Saunders et al. guidelines, and one without which no outcome study can be placed in any of the available categories. Craven and Lee rebutted this paper in a reply that concentrated on holding therapy rather than dyadic developmental psychotherapy.

It appears from the reports that attachment therapy techniques may have been used in addition to standard DDP. The therapist in Becker-Weidman's study instructed parents to use the "attachment parenting methods" of two authors who are described by Jean Mercer as advocating "coercive and intimidating approaches to children in treatment", specifically physical restraint and withholding of food and drink. Because of this deviation from the modern presentation of DDP, Mercer argues that the study cannot be considered a test of DDP in its current form. Mercer cites Becker-Weidman's research as an example of the Woozle effect, in which "flawed, limited, or exaggerated data" is uncritically repeated and republished until it achieves popular acceptance.

== See also ==
- Attachment disorder
- Attachment in children
- Attachment theory
- Attachment therapy
- Attachment-based therapy
- Building the Bonds of Attachment: Awakening Love in Deeply Troubled Children
- Complex post-traumatic stress disorder
- Reactive attachment disorder
