= Attachment therapy =

Pseudoscientific category of mental health interventions

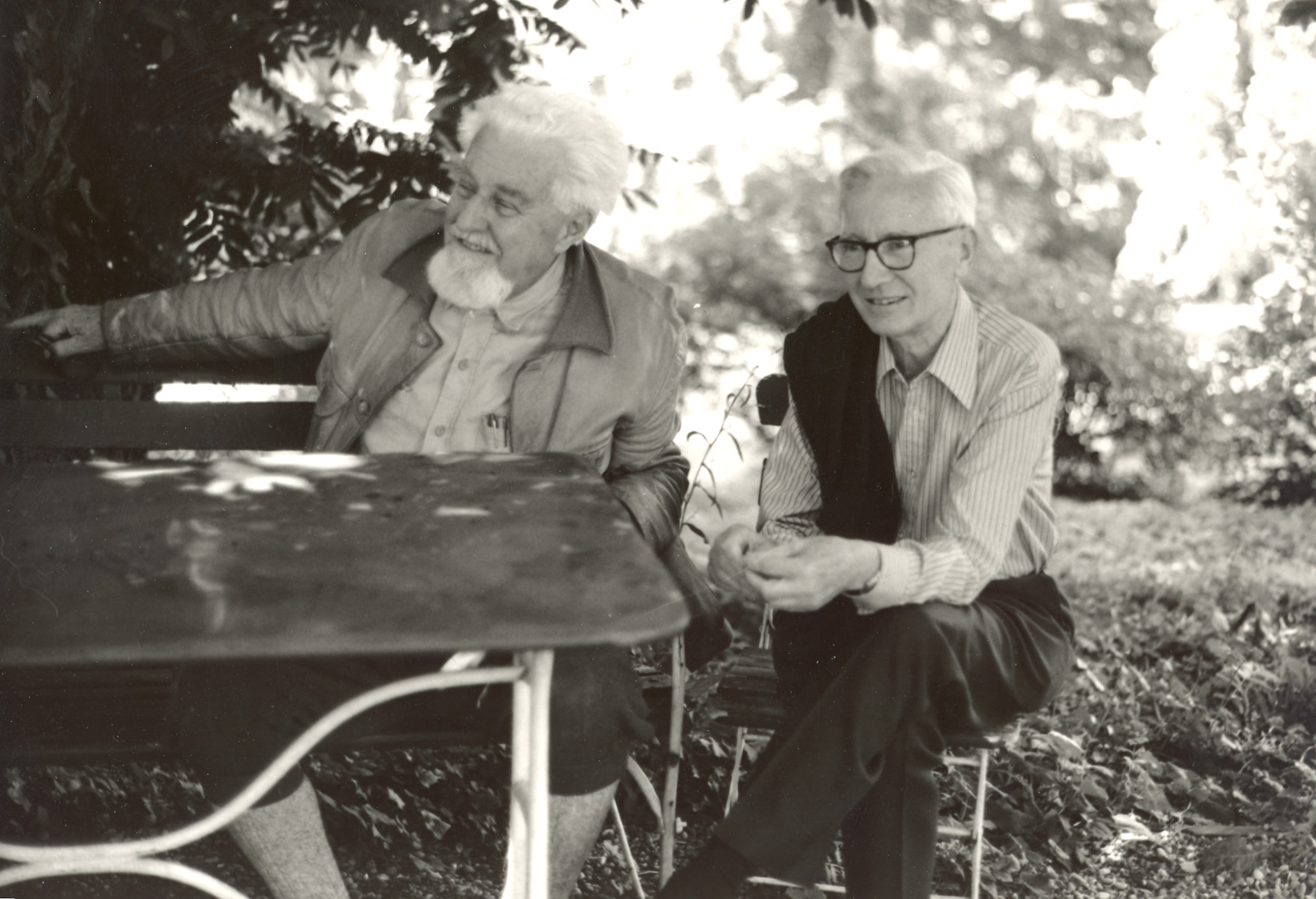
Nikolaas Tinbergen (right), Konrad Lorenz (left)

Attachment therapy (also called "the Evergreen model", "holding time", "rage-reduction", "compression therapy", "rebirthing", "corrective attachment therapy", "coercive restraint therapy", and "holding therapy") is a pseudoscientific mental health intervention intended to treat attachment disorders in children. During the height of its popularity, the practice was found primarily in the United States; much of it was centered in about a dozen locations in Evergreen, Colorado, where Foster Cline, one of its founders, established a clinic in the 1970s.

The practice has resulted in adverse outcomes for children, including at least six documented child fatalities. Since the 1990s, there have been a number of prosecutions for deaths or serious maltreatment of children at the hands of "holding therapists" or parents following their instructions. Two of the most well-known cases are those of Candace Newmaker in 2000 and the Gravelles in 2003. Following the associated publicity, some advocates of attachment therapy began to alter views and practices to be less potentially dangerous to children. This change may have been hastened by the publication of a task force report on the subject in January 2006, commissioned by the American Professional Society on the Abuse of Children (APSAC), which was largely critical of attachment therapy. In April 2007, ATTACH, an organization originally set up by attachment-based therapists, formally adopted a white paper stating its unequivocal opposition to the use of coercive practices in therapy and parenting, promoting instead newer techniques of attunement, sensitivity and regulation.

Attachment therapy is primarily based on Robert Zaslow's rage-reduction therapy from the 1960s-1970s and on psychoanalytic theories about suppressed rage, catharsis, regression, breaking down of resistance and defence mechanisms. Zaslow and other early proponents such as Nikolaas Tinbergen and Martha Welch used it as a treatment for autism, based on the now discredited belief that autism was the result of failures in the attachment relationship with the mother.

This form of treatment differs significantly from attachment-based therapies, as well as talking psychotherapies such as attachment-based psychotherapy and relational psychoanalysis.

== Theory ==
Attachment therapy is a treatment used primarily with fostered or adopted children who have behavioral difficulties, including disobedience and perceived lack of gratitude or affection for their caregivers. The children's problems are ascribed to an inability to bond to their new parents, because of suppressed rage due to past maltreatment and abandonment. Attachment therapy involves a child being firmly held and/or lain upon by therapists or parents. Through this process of restraint and confrontation, therapists seek to produce in the child a range of responses such as rage and despair with the goal of achieving catharsis. In theory, when the child's resistance is overcome and the rage is released, the child is reduced to an infantile state in which he or she can be "re-parented" by methods such as cradling, rocking, bottle feeding and enforced eye contact. The aim is to promote bonding with the new caregivers. Control over the children is usually considered essential, and the therapy is often accompanied by parenting techniques which emphasize obedience. These accompanying parenting techniques are based on the belief that a properly bonded child should comply with parental demands in a manner "fast, snappy and right the first time" and should be "fun to be around". These techniques have been implicated in several child deaths and other harmful effects.

This form of therapy, including diagnosis and accompanying parenting techniques, is not scientifically validated, nor is it considered to be part of mainstream psychology. The form described as "attachment therapy", despite its name, has theoretical foundations inconsistent with those of attachment theory and its guidance is incompatible with the norms of attachment-based therapy.

== Treatment characteristics ==
The controversy, as outlined in the 2006 American Professional Society on the Abuse of Children (APSAC) Task Force Report, has broadly centered around "holding therapy" and coercive, restraining, or aversive procedures. These include deep tissue massage, aversive tickling, punishments related to food and water intake, enforced eye contact, requiring children to submit totally to adult control over all their needs, barring normal social relationships outside the primary caretaker, encouraging children to regress to infant status, reparenting, attachment parenting, or techniques designed to provoke cathartic emotional discharge. Variants of these treatments have carried various labels that change frequently. They may be known as "rebirthing therapy", "compression therapy", "corrective attachment therapy", "the Evergreen model", "holding time", "rage-reduction therapy", or "prolonged parent-child embrace therapy". Some authors critical of this therapeutic approach have used the term Coercive Restraint Therapy. It is this form of treatment for attachment difficulties or disorders which is popularly known as "attachment therapy". Advocates for Children in Therapy, a group that campaigns against attachment therapy, give a list of therapies they state are attachment therapy by another name. They also provide a list of additional therapies used by attachment therapists which they consider to be unvalidated.

Matthew Speltz of the University of Washington School of Medicine describes a typical treatment taken from The Center's material (apparently a replication of the program at the Attachment Center, Evergreen) as follows:

Like Welsh [sic] (1984, 1989), The Center induces rage by physically restraining the child and forcing eye contact with the therapist (the child must lie across the laps of two therapists, looking up at one of them). In a workshop handout prepared by two therapists at The Center, the following sequence of events is described: (1) therapist 'forces control' by holding (which produces child 'rage'); (2) rage leads to child 'capitulation' to the therapist, as indicated by the child breaking down emotionally ('sobbing'); (3) the therapist takes advantage of the child's capitulation by showing nurturance and warmth; (4) this new trust allows the child to accept 'control' by the therapist and eventually the parent. According to The Center's treatment protocol, if the child 'shuts down' (i.e., refuses to comply), he or she may be threatened with detainment for the day at the clinic or forced placement in a temporary foster home; this is explained to the child as a consequence of not choosing to be a 'family boy or girl.' If the child is actually placed in foster care, the child is then required to 'earn the way back to therapy' and a chance to resume living with the adoptive family.

According to the APSAC Task Force,

A central feature of many of these therapies is the use of psychological, physical, or aggressive means to provoke the child to catharsis, ventilation of rage, or other sorts of acute emotional discharge. To do this, a variety of coercive techniques are used, including scheduled holding, binding, rib cage stimulation (e.g., tickling, pinching, knuckling), and/or licking. Children may be held down, may have several adults lie on top of them, or their faces may be held so they can be forced to engage in prolonged eye contact. Sessions may last from 3 to 5 hours, with some sessions reportedly lasting longer ... Similar but less physically coercive approaches may involve holding the child and psychologically encouraging the child to vent anger toward her or his biological parent.

The APSAC Task Force describes how the conceptual focus of these treatments is the child's individual internal pathology and past caregivers rather than current parent-child relationships or current environment. If the child is well-behaved outside the home, the child's doing so is seen as successful manipulation of outsiders rather than as evidence of a problem in the current home or current parent-child relationship. The APSAC Task Force noted that this perspective has its attractions because it relieves the caregivers of responsibility to change aspects of their own behavior and aspirations. Proponents believe that traditional therapies fail to help children with bonding problems because it is impossible to establish a trusting relationship with them. They believe this is because children with bonding problems actively avoid forming genuine relationships. Proponents emphasize the child's resistance to bonding and the need to break it down. In rebirthing and similar approaches, protests of distress from the child are considered to be resistance that must be overcome by more coercion.

Coercive techniques, such as scheduled or enforced holding, may also serve the intended purpose of demonstrating dominance over the child. Establishing total adult control, demonstrating to the child that they have no control, and demonstrating that all of the child's needs are met through the adult, is a central tenet of many controversial attachment therapies. Similarly, many controversial treatments hold that children described as attachment–disordered must be pushed to revisit and relive early trauma. Children may be encouraged to regress to an earlier age where trauma was experienced or be reparented through holding sessions. Other features of holding therapy are the "two-week intensive" course of therapy, and the use of "therapeutic foster parents" with whom the child stays whilst undergoing therapy. According to O'Connor and Zeanah, the "holding" approach would be viewed as intrusive and therefore non-sensitive and counter-therapeutic, in contrast with accepted theories of attachment.

According to Advocates for Children in Therapy,

Attachment Therapy almost always involves extremely confrontational, often hostile confrontation of a child by a therapist or parent (sometimes both). Restraint of the child by more powerful adult(s) is considered an essential part of the confrontation." The purported correction is described as "... to force the children into loving (attaching to) their parents; ... there is a hands-on treatment involving physical restraint and discomfort. Attachment Therapy is the imposition of boundary violations – most often coercive restraint – and verbal abuse on a child, usually for hours at a time; ... Typically, the child is put in a lap hold with the arms pinned down, or alternatively an adult lies on top of a child lying prone on the floor.

Psychiatrist Bruce Perry cites the use of holding therapy techniques by caseworkers and foster parents investigating a Satanic Ritual Abuse case in the late 1980s, early 1990s, as instrumental in obtaining lengthy and detailed alleged "disclosures" from children. In his opinion, using force or coercion on traumatized children simply re-traumatizes them and far from producing love and affection, produces obedience based on fear, as in the trauma bond known as Stockholm syndrome.

=== Parenting techniques ===
Therapists often instruct parents to follow programs of treatment at home, for example obedience-training techniques such as "strong sitting" (frequent periods of required silence and immobility) and withholding or limiting food. Earlier authors sometimes referred to this as "German Shepherd training". In some programs children undergoing the two-week intensive stay with "therapeutic foster parents" for the duration or beyond and the adoptive parents are trained in their techniques.

According to the APSAC Task Force, because it is believed children with bonding problems resist bonding, fight against it and seek to control others to avoid bonding, the child's character flaws must be broken before bonding can occur. According to proponents, their idea of attachment parenting may include keeping the child at home with no social contacts, home schooling, hard labor or meaningless repetitive chores throughout the day, motionless sitting for prolonged periods of time, and control of all food and water intake and bathroom needs. Children described as attachment-disordered are expected by attachment therapists to comply with parental commands "fast and snappy and right the first time", and to always be "fun to be around" for their parents. Deviation from this standard, such as not finishing chores or arguing, is interpreted as a sign of attachment disorder that must be forcibly eradicated. From this perspective, parenting a child with an attachment disorder is a battle, and winning the battle by defeating the child is paramount.

Proper appreciation of total adult control is also considered vital, and information, such as how long a child will be with therapeutic foster parents or what will happen to him or her next, is deliberately withheld. Attachment parenting expert Nancy Thomas states that attachment-disordered children act worse when given information about what is going to occur because they will use the information to manipulate their environment and everyone in it.

In addition to restrictive behavior, parents are advised to provide daily sessions in which older children are treated as if they were babies to create attachment. The child is held in the caregiver's lap, rocked, hugged and kissed, and fed with a bottle and given sweets. These sessions are carried out at the caregiver's wish and not upon the child's request.

Attachment-based parenting is the widely acknowledged to be the opposite of what holding therapy proponents describe. Attachment is an affectionate, mutually satisfying relationship between a child and a caregiver that serves the purpose of making the child feel safe, secure, protected from danger, and comforted especially after exposure to danger. In addition, bonding and attachment involve overlapping concepts but describe different phenomenon.

=== Contrasting attachment theory-based methods ===
In contrast, traditional attachment theory holds that the provision of a safe and predictable environment and caregiver qualities such as sensitivity, responsiveness to children's physical and emotional needs and consistency, support the development of healthy attachment. Therapy based on this viewpoint emphasizes providing a stable environment and taking a calm, sensitive, non-intrusive, non-threatening, patient, predictable, and nurturing approach toward children. Further, as attachment patterns develop within relationships, methods to correct problems with attachment focus on improving the stability and positive qualities of the caregiver-child interactions and relationship. All mainstream interventions with an existing or developing evidential foundation focus on enhancing caregiver sensitivity, creating positive interactions with caregivers, or change of caregiver if that is not possible with existing caregivers. Some interventions focus specifically on increasing caregiver sensitivity in foster parents.

== Theoretical principles ==
Like a number of other alternative mental health treatments for children, attachment therapy is based on some assumptions that differ strongly from the theoretical foundations of other attachment-based therapies. In contrast to traditional attachment theory, the theory of attachment described by attachment therapy proponents is that young children who experience adversity (including maltreatment, loss, separations, adoption, frequent changes in child care, colic or even frequent ear infections) become enraged at a very deep and primitive level. This results in a lack of ability to bond, attach, or to be genuinely affectionate to others. Suppressed or unconscious rage is theorized to prevent the child from forming bonds with caregivers and leads to behavior problems when the rage erupts into unchecked aggression. Such children are said to fail to develop a conscience, to not trust others, to seek control rather than closeness, to resist the authority of caregivers, and to engage in endless power struggles. They are seen as highly manipulative and as trying to avoid true attachments while simultaneously striving to control those around them through manipulation and superficial sociability. Such children are said to be at risk of becoming psychopaths who will go on to engage in very serious delinquent, criminal, and antisocial behaviors if left untreated. The tone in which the attributes of these children are described has been characterized as "demonizing".

Advocates of this treatment also believe that emotional attachment of a child to a caregiver begins during the prenatal period, during which the unborn child is aware of the mother's thoughts and emotions. If the mother is distressed by the pregnancy, especially if she considers abortion, the child responds with distress and anger that continue through postnatal life. If the child is separated from the mother after birth, no matter how early this occurs, the child again feels distress and rage that will block attachment to a foster or adoptive caregiver. To the contrary, attachment research establishes that the attachment system is not activated until a child is approximately seven months old.

If the child has had a peaceful gestation, but after birth suffers pain or ungratified needs during the first year, attachment will again be blocked. If the child reaches the toddler period safely, but is not treated with strict authority during the second year, according to the so-called "attachment cycle", attachment problems will result. Failure of attachment results in a lengthy list of mood and behavior problems, but these may not be revealed until the child is much older. According to attachment therapist Elizabeth Randolph, attachment problems can be diagnosed even in an asymptomatic child through observation of the child's inability to crawl backward on command.

Critics say holding therapies have been promoted as "attachment" therapies, even though they are more antithetical to than consistent with attachment theory, and not based on attachment theory or research. Indeed, they are considered incompatible. There are many ways in which holding therapy/attachment therapy contradicts Bowlby's attachment theory, e.g. attachment theory's fundamental and evidence-based statement that security is promoted by sensitivity. According to Mary Dozier, "holding therapy does not emanate in any logical way from attachment theory or from attachment research".

== Diagnosis and attachment disorder ==
To the extent that attachment disorders exist or can be diagnosed, holding therapy methods were not recognized in mainstream practice. Prior and Glaser describe two discourses on attachment disorder. One is science-based, found in academic journals and books with careful reference to theory, international classifications and evidence. They list Bowlby, Ainsworth, Tizard, Hodges, Chisholm, O'Connor and Zeanah and colleagues as respected attachment theorists and researchers in the field. The other discourse is found in clinical practice, non-academic literature and on the Internet where claims are made which have no basis in attachment theory and for which there is no empirical evidence. In particular unfounded claims are made as to efficacy of treatments. The Internet is considered essential to the popularization of holding therapy as an "attachment" therapy.

The APSAC Task Force describes the relationship between the proponents of holding therapy and mainstream therapies as polarized. "This polarization is compounded by the fact that holding therapy has largely developed outside the mainstream scientific and professional community and flourishes within its own networks of attachment therapists, treatment centers, caseworkers, and parent support groups. Indeed, proponents and critics of the controversial attachment therapies appear to move in different worlds."

=== Diagnosis lists and questionnaires ===
Both the APSAC Task Force and Prior and Glaser describe the proliferation of alternative "lists" and diagnoses, particularly on the Internet, by proponents of holding therapy, that are not in accord with either DSM or ICD classifications and which are partly based on the unsubstantiated views of Zaslow and Menta and Cline. According to the Task Force, "These types of lists are so nonspecific that high rates of false-positive diagnoses are virtually certain. Posting these types of lists on internet sites that also serve as marketing tools may lead many parents or others to conclude inaccurately that their children have attachment disorders."

Prior and Glaser describe the lists as "wildly inclusive" and state that many of the behaviors in the lists are likely to be the consequences of neglect and abuse rather than located within the attachment paradigm. Descriptions of children are frequently highly pejorative and "demonizing". Examples given from lists of attachment disorder symptoms found on the internet include lying, avoiding eye contact except when lying, persistent nonsense questions or incessant chatter, fascination with fire, blood, gore and evil, food related issues (such as gorging or hoarding), cruelty to animals and lack of conscience. They also give an example from the Evergreen Consultants in Human Behavior which offers a 45-symptom checklist including bossiness, stealing, enuresis and language disorders.

A commonly used diagnostic checklist in attachment therapy is the Randolph Attachment Disorder Questionnaire or "RADQ", which originated at the Institute for Attachment in Evergreen. It is presented not as an assessment of reactive attachment disorder but rather attachment disorder. The checklist includes 93 discrete behaviors, many of which either overlap with other disorders, like Conduct Disorder and Oppositional Defiant Disorder or are not related to attachment difficulties. It is largely based on the earlier Attachment Disorder Symptom Checklist which itself shows considerable overlap with even earlier checklists for indicators of sexual abuse. The Attachment Disorder Symptom Checklist includes statements about the parent's feelings toward the child as well as statements about the child's behavior. For example, parental feelings are evaluated through responses to such statements as "Parent feels used" and "is wary of the child's motives if affection is expressed", and "Parents feel more angry and frustrated with this child than with other children". The child's behavior is referred to in such statements as "Child has a grandiose sense of self-importance" and "Child 'forgets' parental instructions or directives". The compiler of the RADQ claims validity by reference to the Attachment Disorder Symptom Checklist. It also purports to diagnose attachment disorder for which there is no classification. A critic has stated that a major problem of the RADQ is that it has not been validated against any established objective measure of emotional disturbance.

=== Patient recruitment ===
In addition to concerns about the use of non-specific diagnostic checklists on the Internet being used as a marketing tool, the Task Force also noted the extreme claims made by proponents as to both the prevalence and effect of attachment disorders. Some proponents suggest most or a high proportion of adopted children are likely to have an attachment or bonding disorder. Statistics on the prevalence of maltreatment are wrongly used to estimate the prevalence of RAD. Problematical or less desirable styles such as insecure or disorganized attachment are conflated with attachment disorder. Children are labeled as "RADs", "RAD-kids" or "RADishes". They are seen as manipulative, dishonest, without conscience and dangerous. Some holding therapy sites predict that attachment-disordered children will grow up to become violent predators or psychopaths unless they receive the treatment proposed. A sense of urgency is created which serves to justify the application of aggressive and unconventional techniques. One site was noted to contain the argument that Saddam Hussein, Adolf Hitler, and Jeffrey Dahmer were examples of children who were attachment-disordered who "did not get help in time". Foster Cline, in his seminal work on holding therapy, Hope for High Risk and Rage Filled Children, uses the example of Ted Bundy.

In answering the question posed as to how a treatment widely regarded by attachment clinicians and researchers as destructive and unethical came to be linked with attachment theory and to be seen as a viable and useful treatment, O'Connor and Nilson cite the use of the Internet to publicize holding therapy and the lack of knowledgeable mainstream professionals or appropriate mainstream treatments or interventions. They set out recommendations for the better dissemination of both understanding of attachment theory and knowledge of the more recent evidence-based treatment options available.

Rachel Stryker in her anthropological study The Road to Evergreen argues that adoptive families of institutionalized children who have difficulties transitioning to a nuclear family are attracted to the Evergreen model despite the controversy, because it legitimises and reanimates the same ideas about family and domesticity as does the adoption process itself, offering renewed hope of "normal" family life. Institutionalized or abused children often do not conform to adopters conceptualizations of family behaviours and roles. The Evergreen model pathologizes the child's behaviour by a medical diagnosis, thus legitimising the family. As well as the promise of working where traditional therapies fail, holding therapy also offers the idea of attachment as a negotiable social contract that can be enforced in order to convert the unsatisfactory adoptee into the "emotional asset" the family requires. By the use of confrontation the model offers the means to condition children to comply with parental expectations. Where the therapy fails to achieve this the fault is attributed to the child's conscious choice to not be a family member, or the child's inability to perform as family material.

=== Contrasting mainstream position ===
Within mainstream practice, disorders of attachment are classified in DSM-5 and ICD-10 as reactive attachment disorder (generally known as RAD), and Disinhibited social engagement disorder. Both classification systems warn against automatic diagnosis based on abuse or neglect. Many symptoms are present in a variety of other more common and more easily treatable disorders. There is as yet no other accepted definition of attachment disorders.

According to the American Academy of Child and Adolescent Psychiatry (AACAP) practice parameter published in 2005, the question of whether attachment disorders can be reliably diagnosed in older children and adults has not been resolved. Attachment behaviors used for the diagnosis of RAD change markedly with development and defining analogous behaviors in older children is difficult. There are no substantially validated measures of attachment in middle childhood or early adolescence.

== Prevalence ==
Holding therapy prospered during the 1980s and 1990s as a consequence of both the influx of older adopted orphans from Eastern European and third world countries and the inclusion of reactive attachment disorder in the 1980 Diagnostic and Statistical Manual of Mental Disorders which attachment therapists adopted as an alternative name for their existing unvalidated diagnosis of attachment disorder.

According to the APSAC Task Force, these therapies are sufficiently prevalent to have prompted position statements or specific prohibitions against using coercion or restraint as a treatment by mainstream professional societies such as: American Psychological Association (Division on Child Maltreatment), National Association of Social Workers (and its Utah Chapter), American Professional Society on the Abuse of Children, American Academy of Child and Adolescent Psychiatry, and American Psychiatric Association. The Association for the Treatment and Training in the Attachment of Children, (ATTACh), an organization for professionals and families associated with holding therapy, has also issued statements against coercive practices. Two American states, Colorado and North Carolina, have outlawed rebirthing. There have been professional licensure sanctions against some leading proponents and successful criminal prosecutions and imprisonment of therapists and parents using holding therapy techniques. Despite this, the treatments appear to be continuing among networks of attachment therapists, attachment therapy centers, caseworkers, and adoptive or foster parents. The advocacy group ACT states, "Attachment Therapy is a growing, underground movement for the 'treatment' of children who pose disciplinary problems to their parents or caregivers."

Rachel Stryker in her 2010 anthropological study The Road to Evergreen states that attachment therapies "of all stripes" are increasingly popular in the US and that the number of therapists associated with the Evergreen model registering with ATTACh grows each year. She cites the large number of formerly institutionalized domestic and foreign adoptees in the US and the apparently higher risk of disruption of foreign adoptions, of which there were 216,000 between 1998 and 2008.

The practice of holding therapy is not confined to the US. Prior and Glaser cite at least one clinic in the UK. Attachment therapists from the USA have conducted conferences in the UK. The British Association for Adoption and Fostering, (BAAF), has issued an extensive position statement on the subject which covers not only physical coercion but also the underlying theoretical principles. It had been thought, until recently, that therapists calling themselves "attachment therapists" practising in the UK tended to be practising conventional forms of psychotherapy based on attachment theory. In 2009 The British Journal of Social Work accepted an article rehabilitating holding therapy, "To Have and to Hold: Questions about a Therapeutic Service for Children" describing an earlier study involving the Keys Attachment Centre in Rossendale, Lancashire and the surrounding Keys Attachment Homes. In 2012, first-hand accounts from a survivor and a number of professionals provided evidence that the coercive Evergreen model of holding therapy had been systematically used to treat children in Local Authority care within a programme in North West England.

== Developments ==
The APSAC Task Force stated that proponents of holding therapy correctly point out that most critics have never actually observed any of the treatments they criticize or visited any of the centers where the controversial therapies are practiced. Proponents argue that their therapies present no physical risk if undertaken properly and that critics' concerns are based on unrepresentative occurrences and misapplications of techniques, or misunderstanding by parents. Holding is described as gentle or nurturing and it is maintained that intense, cathartic approaches are necessary to help children with attachment disorders. Their evidence for this is primarily clinical experience and testimonials.

According to the APSAC Task Force, there are controversies within the holding therapy community about coercive practices. There has been a move away from coercive and confrontational models towards attunement and emotional regulation amongst some leaders in the field, notably Hughes, Kelly and Popper. A number of therapies are quite different from those that have led to the abuse and deaths of children in much publicized court cases. The Task Force, however, points out that all the therapies, including those using frankly coercive practices, present themselves as humane, respectful and nurturing; therefore caution is advised. Some practitioners condemn the most dangerous techniques but continue to practice other coercive techniques. Others have taken a public stand against coercion. The Task Force was of the view that all could benefit from more transparency and specificity as to how the therapy is behaviorally delivered.

In 2001, 2003 and 2006, ATTACh, an organization set up by Foster Cline and associates, issued a series of statements in which they progressively changed their stance on coercive practices. In 2001, after the death of Candace Newmaker they stated "The child will never be restrained or have pressure put on them in such a manner that would interfere with their basic life functions such as breathing, circulation, temperature, etc." A White Paper, formally accepted in April 2007, "unequivocally state(s) our opposition to the use of coercive practices in therapy and parenting." They acknowledge ATTACh's historical links with catharsis, provocation of rage, and intense confrontation, among other overtly coercive techniques (and indeed continue to offer for sale books by controversial proponents) but state that the organization has evolved significantly away from earlier positions. They state that their recent evolution is due to a number of factors including tragic events resulting from such techniques, an influx of members practicing other techniques such as attunement and a "fundamental shift ... away from viewing these children as driven by a conscious need for control toward an understanding that their often controlling and aggressive behaviors are automatic, learned defensive responses to profoundly overwhelming experiences of fear and terror." While being of the view that authoritative practices are necessary, and that nurturing touch and treatment aimed at the perceived developmental rather than chronological age are an integral part of the therapy, the White Paper promotes the techniques of attunement, sensitivity and regulation and deprecates coercive practices such as enforced holding or enforced eye contact.

== History ==
Matthew Speltz of the University of Washington School of Medicine states that the roots of holding therapy are traceable to psychologist Robert Zaslow and his "Z-process" in the 1970s. Zaslow attempted to force attachment in autistic children by creating rage while holding them against their will. He believed this would lead to a breakdown in their defense mechanisms, making them more receptive to others. Zaslow thought attachment arose when an infant experienced feelings of pain, fear and rage, and then made eye contact with the carer who relieved those feelings. If an infant did not experience this cycle of events by having his fear and rage relieved, the infant would not form an attachment and would not make eye contact with other people. Zaslow believed that creating pain and rage and combining them with eye contact would cause attachment to occur, long after the normal age for such developments. Holding therapies derive from these "rage-reduction" techniques applied by Zaslow. The holding is not used for safety purposes but is initiated for the purpose of provoking strong negative emotions such as fear and anger. The child's release typically depends upon his or her compliance with the therapist's clinical agenda or goals. In 1971, Zaslow surrendered his California psychology license following an injury to a patient during rage-reduction therapy. Zaslow's ideas on the use of the Z-process and holding for autism have been dispelled by research on the genetic/biologic causes of autism.

Zaslow and his "Z-process", a physically rough version of holding therapy, influenced Foster Cline (known as the "father of attachment therapy") and associates at his clinic in Evergreen. A key tenet of Zaslow's approach was the notion of "breaking through" a child's defenses—based on the model of ego defenses borrowed from psychoanalytic theory, which critics state has been misapplied. The "breaking through" metaphor was then applied to children whose attachments were thought to be impaired. The clinic, originally called the Youth Behavior Program, was subsequently renamed the Attachment Center at Evergreen.

In 1983, ethologist Nikolaas Tinbergen published a book recommending the use of holding therapy by parents as a treatment or "cure" for autistic children. Tinbergen based his ideas on his methods of observational study of birds. Parents were advised to hold their autistic children despite resistance and to endeavor to maintain eye contact and share emotions. Tinbergen believed that autism related to a failure in the bond between mother and child caused by "traumatic influences" and that enforced holding and eye contact could establish such a relationship and rescue the child from autism. Tinbergen's interpretations of autism were without scientific rigor and were contrary to the then growing acceptance that autism had a genetic cause. Despite the lack of a sound theoretical or scientific base, holding therapy as a treatment for autism is still practiced in some parts of the world, notably Europe.

Speltz cites child psychiatrist Martha Welch and her 1988 book, Holding Time, as the next significant development. Like Zaslow and Tinbergen, Welch recommended holding therapy as a treatment for autism. Like Tinbergen, Welch believed autism was caused by the failure of the attachment relationship between mother and child. Mothers were instructed to hold their defiant child, provoking anger and rage, until such time as the child ceased to resist, at which point a bonding process was believed to begin.

Foster Cline and associates at the Attachment Center at Evergreen, Colorado began to promote the use of the same or similar holding techniques with adopted, maltreated children who were said to have an "attachment disorder". This was replicated elsewhere such as at "The Center" in the Pacific Northwest. A number of other clinics arose in Evergreen, Colorado, set up by those involved in or trained at the Attachment Center at Evergreen (renamed the Institute for Attachment and Child Development in about 2002). These included one set up by Connell Watkins, formerly an associate of Foster Cline at the Attachment Center and its clinical director. Watkins was one of the therapists convicted in the Candace Newmaker case in 2001 in which a child was asphyxiated during a rebirthing process in the course of a two-week holding therapy "intensive". Foster Cline gave up his license and moved to another state following an investigation of a separate holding therapy related incident.

In addition to the notion of "breaking through" defense mechanisms, other metaphors were adopted by practitioners relating to the supposed effects of early deprivation, abuse or neglect on the child's ability to form relationships. These included the idea of the child's development being "frozen" and treatment being required to "unfreeze" development. Practitioners of holding therapy also added some components of Bowlby's attachment theory and the therapy came to be known as attachment therapy. Language from attachment theory is used but descriptions of the practices contain ideas and techniques based on misapplied metaphors deriving from Zaslow and psychoanalysis, not attachment theory. According to Prior and Glaser "there is no empirical evidence to support Zaslow's theory. The concept of suppressed rage has, nevertheless, continued to be a central focus explaining the children's behavior."

Cline's privately published work Hope for high risk and rage filled children also cites family therapist and hypnotherapist Milton Erickson as a source, and reprints parts of a case of Erickson's published in 1961. The report describes the case of a divorced mother with a non-compliant son. Erickson advised the mother to sit on the child for hours at a time and to feed him only on cold oatmeal while she and a daughter ate appetizing food. The child did increase in compliance, and Erickson noted, with apparent approval, that he trembled when his mother looked at him. Cline commented, with respect to this and other cases, that in his opinion all bonds were trauma bonds. According to Cline, it illustrates the three essential components of 1) taking control, 2) the child's expression of rage; and, 3) relaxation and the development of bonding.

In addition, proponents believed that holding induced age regression, enabling a child to make up for physical affection missed earlier in life. Regression is key to the holding therapy approach. In holding therapy, breaking down the child's resistance by confrontational techniques is thought to reduce the child to an infantile state, thus making the child receptive to forming attachment by the application of early parenting behaviors such as bottle feeding, cradling, rocking and eye contact. Some, but by no means all, attachment therapists have used rebirthing techniques to aid regression. The roots of the form of rebirthing used within holding therapy lie in primal therapy (sometimes known as primal scream therapy), another therapy based on beliefs in very early trauma and the transformational nature of age regression. Bowlby explicitly rejected the notion of regression stating "present knowledge of infant and child development requires that a theory of developmental pathways should replace theories that invoke specific phases of development in which it is held a person may become fixated and/or to which he may regress."

According to O'Connor and Nilsen, although other aspects of treatment are applied, the holding component has attracted most attention because proponents believe it is an essential ingredient. They also considered the lack of available and suitable interventions from mainstream professionals as essential to the popularization of holding therapy as an attachment therapy.

In 2003, an issue of Attachment & Human Development was devoted to the subject of attachment therapy with articles by well-known experts in the field of attachment. Attachment researchers and authors condemned holding therapy as empirically unfounded, theoretically flawed and clinically unethical. It has also been described as potentially abusive and a pseudoscientific intervention, not based on attachment theory or research, that has resulted in tragic outcomes for children including at least six documented child fatalities. In 2006, the American Professional Society on the Abuse of Children (APSAC) Task Force reported on the subjects of attachment therapy, reactive attachment disorder, and attachment problems and laid down guidelines for the future diagnosis and treatment of attachment disorders. The APSAC Task Force was largely critical of Attachment Therapy's theoretical base, practices, claims to an evidence base, non-specific symptoms lists published on the internet, claims that traditional treatments do not work and dire predictions for the future of children who do not receive attachment therapy. "Although focused primarily on specific attachment therapy techniques, the controversy also extends to the theories, diagnoses, diagnostic practices, beliefs, and social group norms supporting these techniques, and to the patient recruitment and advertising practices used by their proponents." In 2007, Scott Lilienfeld included holding therapy as one of the potentially harmful therapies (PHT's) at level 1 in his Psychological Science review. Describing it as "unfortunately" referred to as "attachment therapy", Mary Dozier and Michael Rutter consider it critical to differentiate it from treatments derived from attachment theory. A mistaken association between attachment therapy and attachment theory may have resulted in a relatively unenthusiastic view towards the latter among some practitioners despite its relatively profound lines of research in the field of socioemotional development.

== Claims ==
According to the APSAC Task Force, proponents of holding therapy commonly assert that their therapies alone are effective for attachment-disordered children and that traditional treatments are ineffective or harmful. The APSAC Task Force expressed concern over claims by therapies to be "evidence-based", or the only evidence-based therapy, when the Task Force found no credible evidence base for any such therapy so advertised. Nor did it accept more recent claims to evidence base in its November 2006 Reply.

Two approaches on which published studies have been undertaken are holding therapy and dyadic developmental psychotherapy. Each of these non-randomized studies concluded that the treatment method studied was effective. Both the APSAC Task Force and Prior and Glaser cite and criticize the one published study on holding therapy undertaken by Myeroff et al., which "purports to be an evaluation of holding therapy". This study covers the "across the lap" approach, described as "not restraint" by Howe and Fearnley but "being held whilst unable to gain release." Prior and Glaser state that although the Myeroff study claims it is based on attachment theory, the theoretical basis for the treatment is in fact Zaslow.

Dyadic developmental psychotherapy was developed by psychologist Daniel Hughes, described by the Task Force as a "leading attachment therapist". Hughes' website gave a list of attachment therapy techniques, repeated by the APSAC Task Force from an earlier website, which he stated do not or should not form part of dyadic developmental psychotherapy, which the Task Force took as a description of attachment therapy techniques. Two studies on dyadic developmental psychotherapy have been published by Becker-Weidman, the second being a four-year follow up of the first. Prior and Glaser state Hughes' therapy reads as good therapy for abused and neglected children, though with "little application of attachment theory", but the advocacy group ACT and the Task Force place Hughes within the attachment therapy paradigm.

In 2004, Saunders, Berliner and Hanson developed a system of categories for social work interventions which has proved somewhat controversial. In their first analysis, holding therapy was placed in Category 6 as a "Concerning treatment". In 2006 Craven and Lee classified 18 studies in a literature review under the Saunders, Berliner & Hanson system. They considered both dyadic developmental psychotherapy and holding therapy. They placed both in Category 3 as "Supported and acceptable". This categorization by Craven and Lee has been criticized as unduly favorable, a point to which Craven and Lee responded by arguments in support of holding therapy. Both Myeroff et al.'s study and Becker-Weidman's first study (published after the main Report) were examined in the Task Force's November 2006 Reply to Letters and were criticized as to their methodology. Becker-Weidman's study was described by the Task Force as "an important first step toward learning the facts about DDP outcomes" but falling far short of the criteria necessary to constitute an evidence base.

Some studies are still being undertaken on coercive therapies. A non-randomized, before-and-after 2006 pilot study by Welch (the progenitor of "holding time") et al. on Welch's "prolonged parent-child embrace therapy" was conducted on children with a range of diagnoses for behavioral disorders and claimed to show significant improvement.

In March 2007, attachment therapy was placed on a list of treatments that have the potential to cause harm to clients in the APS journal, Perspectives on Psychological Science. Concern was expressed about methods that involve holding and restraint, and the lack of randomized, controlled experiments showing the effectiveness of the treatment.

In 2010 a modest social work study and "invitation to a debate", based on interviews with the deliverers and recipients of a therapeutic intervention incorporating non-coercive holding at one centre in the UK, called for further consideration of the use of this type of intervention. The intervention was not described as "holding therapy" but as using a degree of holding in the course of therapy. Although recipients were generally positive about the therapy received, the holding aspect was the least liked. The authors call for research and a debate on issues of what constitutes "coercion" and the distinctions between the different variants of "holding" in therapy.

== Cases of harm and death ==
There have been a number of cases of serious harm to children, all adopted, while using the therapy. An estimated six children have died as a consequence of the more coercive forms of such treatments or the application of the accompanying parenting techniques.

- Andrea Swenson, 1990; a 13-year-old adopted girl undergoing attachment therapy at The Attachment Center, Evergreen, Colorado. She was placed with "therapeutic foster parents". When the insurance company refused to continue to pay for her treatment, the adoptive parents were asked to allow the foster parents to adopt Andrea so that a fresh claim could be made. Andrea, having asked her foster parents what would happen if she took an overdose of drugs or slit her wrist, and been told she would die, took an overdose of aspirin. She was violently ill during the night and was incoherent, breathing heavily and still vomiting in the morning. Nevertheless, the foster parents went bowling, leaving her alone. A visitor found her dead in the hallway. The suit was settled out of court.
- Lucas Ciambrone, 1995; a seven-year-old adopted boy who was starved, beaten, bitten and forced to sleep in a stripped bathroom at his parents home in Sarasota, Florida. At the post-mortem he was found to have 200 bruises and five old broken ribs. The adoptive mother was convicted as the abuser and the adoptive father of being aware but doing nothing to prevent it or seek help. Foster Cline gave evidence for both parents claiming Lucas had reactive attachment disorder and that living with such a child was like living "in a situation with the same psychic pressures as those experienced in a concentration camp or cult" and that the parents were in no way responsible for the genesis of Lucas' alleged difficult behaviors. No violent or angry behaviors were reported at school.
- David Polreis, 1996; a two-year-old adopted boy who was beaten to death by his adoptive mother. Foster Cline gave evidence for the mother claiming David had reactive attachment disorder. The adoptive mother, supported by attachment therapists practising the Evergreen model, claimed he had beaten himself to death as a consequence of his attachment disorder. She subsequently instead claimed he had attacked her and she had acted in self-defense. David had been diagnosed with attachment disorder by an attachment therapist and was undergoing treatment and accompanying attachment parenting techniques. Mourners at the funeral were asked to contribute to The Attachment Center.
- Krystal Tibbets, 1997; a three-year-old adopted child who was killed by her adoptive father using holding therapy techniques he claimed had been taught to him by an attachment therapy center in Midvale, Utah. This was denied by the therapist and the adoptive mother. He lay on top of Krystal, a technique known as "compression therapy", and pushed his fist into her abdomen to release "visceral rage" and to enforce bonding. When she stopped screaming and struggling he believed she had "shut down" as a form of "resistance". After his release from a five-year prison sentence the adoptive father campaigned to have attachment therapy banned.
- Candace Newmaker, 2000; a ten-year-old adopted girl who was killed by asphyxiation during a rebirthing session used as part of a two-week attachment therapy "intensive". The two attachment therapists, Connell Watkins (formerly of The Attachment Center, Evergreen) and Julie Ponder were each sentenced to 16 years imprisonment for their part in the therapy during which Candace was wrapped in blankets and required to struggle to be reborn, against the weight of several adults. Her inability to struggle out was interpreted as "resistance". Her adoptive mother and the "therapeutic foster parents" with whom she had been placed received lesser penalties. Watkins was released on parole in August 2008 after serving approximately 7 years of her sentence.
- Logan Marr, 2001; a five-year-old child who had been fostered by a Maine state caseworker. While having a tantrum, the screaming girl was buckled into a highchair, wrapped with duct tape, including over her mouth, and left in a basement where she suffocated. The foster mother claimed to have used some attachment therapy ideas and techniques she had picked up when working as a caseworker.
- Cassandra Killpack, 2002; a four-year-old adopted child who died from complications of hyponatremia secondary to water intoxication. This apparently occurred when she was restrained in a chair and forced to drink excessive amounts of water by her adoptive parents as part of an "attachment-based" treatment using techniques they claimed had been taught to them at the attachment therapy center where Cassandra was undergoing treatment. It appears this was a punishment for having drunk some of her sister's drink.
- Gravelles, 2003; 11 children adopted by Michael and Sharon Gravelle. Ten of the 11 children slept in cages. The case also involved allegations of extreme control over food and toileting and severe punishments for disobedience. The children were home-schooled. Some of the children underwent holding therapy from their attachment therapist and the adoptive parents used accompanying attachment therapy parenting techniques at home. The adoptive parents and therapist were prosecuted and convicted in 2003.
- Vasquez, 2007: four adopted children, three of them were kept in cages, fed limited diets, and permitted only primitive sanitary facilities. The fourth child, the favorite, was given medication to delay puberty. The adoptive mother received a prison sentence of less than a year and her parental rights were terminated in 2007. There was no therapist in this case but the adoptive mother claimed that three of her four adopted children had reactive attachment disorder.
- Skyler Wilson, 2023: A 2-year-old adopted child who died from hypoxic brain injuries after being "swaddled" and allegedly duct-taped to the floor by his adoptive parents, who referenced Nancy Thomas by name in information provided to the police. A former foster parent also alleged that the adoptive parents performed exorcisms. Jodi and Joseph Wilson both pleaded guilty and were sentenced to 32 to 40 years in prison.

== See also ==
- Attachment-based therapy
- Traumatic bonding
- Child development
- Child abuse
- Theraplay
- Child of Rage
- Death of Candace Newmaker
