= Building the Bonds of Attachment =

Book by Daniel A. Hughes

Building the Bonds of Attachment: Awakening Love in Deeply Troubled Children
- Author: Daniel A. Hughes
- Language: English
- Subject: Child psychology
- Genre: Non-fiction
- Publisher: Jason Aronson
- Publication date: 1998
- ISBN: 0-7657-0237-1

Building the Bonds of Attachment: Awakening Love in Deeply Troubled Children by Daniel A. Hughes is a guide to the therapy and parenting of children experiencing attachment disorder that promotes dyadic developmental psychotherapy.

== Summary ==
The contents of the book have changed from one edition to another, reflecting changing research and practice. This summary is based on the third edition.

Building the Bonds of Attachment comprises eighteen chapters, most of which comprise a narrative account of the life and therapeutic journey of a fictional child, Katie, followed by a 'commentary' which makes explicit the psychological issues and therapeutic practices being portrayed.

Katie is born in the American state of Maine in August 1987 and experiences both severe neglect and more explicit forms of abuse from her birth parents. Adapting to these circumstances, Katie does not learn to trust or to share joy or empathise with others, but rather to try to control the people around her, whether through politeness, tantrums, or other forms of manipulation. She internalises a profound sense of shame but lacks awareness of her inner states and a coherent self-concept; her emotional development is thus significantly impaired. Taken into the care of the state at the age of five, Katie passes through three foster-homes from September 1992 to June 1994: while committed in their different ways, the foster parents and therapist who attempt to support Katie through this period are not equipped to help a child with so limited a framework for interpersonal subjectivity to overcome her difficulties, which frequently lead Katie to endanger herself and others.

In June 1994, however, Katie begins to work with a therapist named Allison and foster-mother named Jackie whose practice is based on adopting a playful, accepting, curious, and empathetic attitude to Katie associated with dyadic developmental psychotherapy, nurturing Katie's recognition that she is now in a safe environment in which she no longer needs to focus on controlling others but can instead undertake the emotional development that she has missed out on. This practice includes limiting Katie's opportunities for socially unsuccessful behaviours by providing the extremely close parental supervision and limited choices normally associated with much younger children. By her eighth birthday, Katie has successfully formed an attachment with Jackie, participating in family life and forming friendships. Despite previously expecting only to foster Katie until she would be able to form an attachment with adoptive parents, Jackie decides to adopt Katie.

The introduction and first chapter of the book make explicit its theoretical framework; the book concludes with a bibliography.

== Editions ==
- Building the Bonds of Attachment: Awakening Love in Deeply Troubled Children (Northvale, NJ and London: Jason Aronson Inc., 1998). ISBN 0-7657-0237-1
- Building the Bonds of Attachment: Awakening Love in Deeply Troubled Children, 2nd edn (Lanham, MD: Jason Aronson Inc., 2006). ISBN 9780765704047
- Building the Bonds of Attachment: Awakening Love in Deeply Troubled Children, 3rd edn (Lanham: Rowman & Littlefield, 2018). ISBN 9781442274143

== Reviews ==
- Michael Trout, 'Building the Bonds of Attachment: Awakening Love in Deeply Troubled Children', Journal of Prenatal & Perinatal Psychology & Health, 17.2 (Winter 2002), 176–78.
- Leonie Gilham, 'Building the Bonds of Attachment: Awakening Love in Deeply Troubled Children, 2nd edition', Developing Practice: The Child, Youth and Family Work Journal, 15 (Autumn 2006), 75-76 https://search.informit.org/doi/10.3316/INFORMIT.837775060458692
- Kelly DiBenedetto, 'Book Review: Building the Bonds of Attachment: Awakening Love in Deeply Troubled Children', Boston Post Adoption Resources (5 February 2016)
