= Ashley Peldon =

American actress (b. 1984)

- Born: April 2, 1984 (age 42); Montpelier, Vermont, U.S.
- Occupation: Actress
- Years active: 1988–present
- Spouse: Steve Hurdle (m. 2010)
- Children: 2
- Relatives: Courtney Peldon (sister)
- Website: www.ashleypeldonactress.com

Ashley Peldon (born April 2, 1984) is an American actress, starting as a child actress, transitioning to adult roles, then primarily voice acting after 2008. She has many credits for screams provided for sound effects.

== Life and career ==
Peldon and her sister Courtney began their careers as child actors. In 1988, Ashley Peldon was cast as Marah Lewis, daughter of Joshua and Reva Lewis on the daytime soap opera Guiding Light. In 1991, Peldon received a Daytime Emmy Award nomination for her role on the show.

She went on to appear in motion pictures such as The Lemon Sisters, Stella, Deceived, Drop Dead Fred, Arthur Miller's The Crucible, Ghost World and other films. For two years Peldon appeared on the NBC television series The Mommies, ABC television series Home Improvement and has had recurring roles on such television series as That 70s Show and The Pretender. Peldon starred as "spoiled actress Amy King" in MTV's comedy series Connected.

In January 2007, Peldon graduated from Skidmore College in New York with a bachelor's degree in Child Psychology and Film. Her interest in child psychology originated from her dramatic role as a sexually abused child in CBS' Child of Rage when she was 7 years old. In February 2008, Peldon directed an Allan Heinberg play for TV Takes the Stage. The play starred Bonnie Somerville and Melissa Sagemiller.

Peldon earned her master's degree in clinical psychology. In 2014, she was pursuing a PhD in depth psychology.

== Personal life ==
Peldon married her husband Steve Hurdle in 2010 and they have two daughters.

== Awards and nominations ==
She was nominated in 1991 for a Daytime Emmy at the Daytime Emmy Awards for Outstanding Younger Actress in a Drama Series for The Guiding Light (1952).

She is a multiple and a six and three years consecutive nominee and award winner of a Young Artist Award at the Young Artist Awards:

- 1990 - Won for Best Young Actress in a Daytime Drama for The Guiding Light (1952)
- 1991 - Nominated for Best Young Actress in a Daytime Series for The Guiding Light (1952).
- 1992 - Nominated for Best Young Actress in a Daytime Series for The Guiding Light (1952).
- 1993 - Won for Best Young Actress Under Ten in a Television Movie for Child of Rage (1992) (TV).
- 1994 - Nominated for Outstanding Youth Ensemble in a Television Series for The Mommies (1993) shared with Sam Gifaldi, Ryan Merriman, Shiloh Strong and Joey Zimmerman and won for Best Actress Under Ten in a Television Series or Show for Shameful Secrets (1993) (TV) tied with Ashley Johnson for Phenom (1993).
- 1995 - Nominated three times, for Best Youth Comedienne in a TV Show and for Best Performance by an Actress Under Ten in a TV Series for The Mommies (1993) and for Best Performance by a Youth Actress in a TV Mini-Series or Special for Without Warning (1994) (TV).
- 1997 - Nominated for Best Performance in a Drama Series by a Young Actress for The Pretender (1996).
- 1998 - Nominated twice, for Best Performance in a Voiceover in TV or Film by a Young Actress for Cats Don't Dance (1997) and for Best Performance in a TV Movie/Pilot/Mini-Series by a Leading Young Actress for The Westing Game (1997) (TV) as the main character Tabitha Ruth/Turtle/Alice Wexler.
- 1999 - Nominated for Best Performance in a TV Drama Series by a Guest Starring Young Actress for The Pretender (1996).

== Filmography ==
Film and television
Year	Title	Role	Notes
1988-91	Guiding Light	Marah Lewis	
1990	Stella	Jenny Claire (age 3)	
1990	The Lemon Sisters	Sarah Frank	
1991	Drop Dead Fred	Young Elizabeth	
1991	Deceived	Mary Saunders	
1991	The Torkelsons	Molly Jeffers	1 episode
1992	Day-O	Grace (age 4)	Telefilm
1992	Child of Rage	Catherine	Telefilm
1992–94	The Little Mermaid	Additional voices	3 episodes
1993	Quantum Leap	Jessica Elroy	1 episode
1993-1995	The Mommies	Kasey Larson	Main cast
1993	Shameful Secrets	Josie Tate	Telefilm
1994	Without Warning	Kimberly Hastings	Telefilm
1995	Black Scorpion	Little Darcy	Telefilm
1996	Jake's Women	Young Molly	Telefilm
1996	Ellen	Little Paige	1 episode
1996	The Crucible	Ruth Putnam	
1996-99	The Pretender	Young Miss Parker	Recurring role
1997	Cats Don't Dance	Darla Dimple	Voice role
1997	Get a Clue	Tabitha Ruth "Turtle" Wexler	
1997	Home Improvement	Diane	1 episode
1998	With Friends Like These...	Marissa DiMartino	
1998	Jungle Book: Mowgli's Story	Teen Raksha the Wolf	Video (voice role)
2001	Tucker	Juliette	1 episode
2001	That '70s Show	Teenage Kitty Sigurdson	2 episodes
2001	Ghost World	Margaret	
2001	Undressed	Tabitha	1 episode
2007	Night Skies (film)	Molly	
2009	Aliens in the Attic	Additional voices	
2012	Chronicle	Flyer school girl (voice)	
2017–18	Trollhunters: Tales of Arcadia	Additional voices	
2018	3Below: Tales of Arcadia	Additional voices	
2021	The Mitchells vs. the Machines	Additional voices	
2021	What If...?	Additional voices	
2022	Scream	ADR Looper	
2023	Godzilla Minus One	Additional voices	English dub
