= Cats Don't Dance =

1997 film by Mark Dindal

- Theatrical release poster by John Alvin
- Directed by: Mark Dindal
- Screenplay by: Bobs Gannaway; Cliff Ruby; Elana Lesser; Theresa Pettengill
- Story by: Rick Schneider; Robert Lence; Mark Dindal; Kelvin Yasuda; Brian McEntee; David Womersley
- Produced by: David Kirschner; Paul Gertz
- Starring: Scott Bakula; Jasmine Guy; Ashley Peldon; Kathy Najimy; John Rhys-Davies; George Kennedy; René Auberjonois; Hal Holbrook; Don Knotts; Betty Lou Gerson; Matthew Herried; Frank Welker; David Johansen; Mark Dindal
- Edited by: Dan Molina
- Music by: Steve Goldstein; Randy Newman (songs)
- Production companies: Turner Feature Animation; David Kirschner Productions
- Distributed by: Warner Bros.
- Release date: March 26, 1997
- Running time: 74 minutes
- Country: United States
- Language: English
- Budget: $32 million
- Box office: $3.5 million (domestic)

Cats Don't Dance is a 1997 American animated musical comedy film directed by Mark Dindal (in his feature directorial debut), written by Bobs Gannaway, Theresa Pettengill, and the writing team of Cliff Ruby and Elana Lesser, and featuring the voices of Scott Bakula, Jasmine Guy, Ashley Peldon, Kathy Najimy, John Rhys-Davies, George Kennedy, René Auberjonois, Hal Holbrook, Don Knotts, Betty Lou Gerson (in her final film role), Matthew Herried, Frank Welker, David Johansen and Dindal.

Cats Don't Dance originated in 1993 as a proposed film collaboration between Michael Jackson and David Kirschner. It was announced as a film combining live action and animation, with Jackson attached to star and consult on the music and choreography. By late 1994, Jackson had dropped out of the project. It was reverted to Turner Feature Animation. It features six original songs written by Randy Newman, and an original musical orchestral score composed by Steve Goldstein. It was the only fully animated feature film produced by Turner Feature Animation, which was absorbed into Warner Bros. Animation when Turner Broadcasting System merged with Time Warner during the post-production of Cats Don't Dance in 1996. The film's production took four-and-a-half years to be completed.

Cats Don't Dance was theatrically released in the United States on March 26, 1997 by Warner Bros.. The film received generally positive reviews from critics. However, it was a box-office failure, grossing $3.5 million domestically. The film's producer David Kirschner blamed Warner Bros. for a failed marketing campaign and a lack of promotional tie-ins. Cats Don't Dance won two Annie Awards, Best Animated Feature and Best Music in a Feature Production, becoming the first non-Disney animated film to receive these awards.

== Plot ==
In an alternate 1939, where humans and anthropomorphic animals coexist, Danny, an optimistic orange tabby cat from Kokomo, Indiana, travels to Hollywood in hopes of starting an acting career there. After meeting a young penguin named Pudge, Danny is selected by agent Farley Wink to feature in a film that is in production at Mammoth Pictures called Lil' Ark Angel, alongside Wink's secretary, a cynical Turkish Angora cat named Sawyer. Upon joining fellow animals—Tillie the hippo, Cranston the goat, Frances the fish, and T.W the tortoise—Danny is dismayed on learning how minor his role is and tries weaseling his way into more time in the spotlight. Danny unwittingly angers the film's star Darla Dimple, a popular yet spoiled child actress; she promptly has her gigantic butler Max intimidate Danny against further attempts to enlarge his part.

Danny learns from the studio's mascot Woolie the elephant that human actors are normally given more important roles than animals, whereas animals themselves end up getting minor and often thankless roles to the point of having little to no leverage in show business. The next day, Danny reminds the other animals of their past aspirations by instigating a mass musical performance in an alleyway, which draws Darla's attention. Overhearing Danny's intention to make an appeal to Mammoth Pictures head L.B. Mammoth, Darla invites Danny to her mansion and grants him and the animals full use of the Li'l Ark Angel stage on the day of a press conference held by Mammoth, on the condition that Danny not reveal her involvement in this ostensibly charitable act. Danny happily accepts the offer, unaware that Darla is secretly setting the animals up for failure to prevent them from stealing her spotlight. As the animals prepare their performance on the ark, Darla and Max create a catastrophic flood that washes through Mammoth studios, for which Mammoth blames and dismisses the animals. When the satisfied Darla arrives to thank Danny, he is admonished for his naivety and advised by Woolie to return to Kokomo.

That night, Sawyer takes to heart Danny's attempts to keep the animals' dreams alive and tries catching him at the bus stop, but narrowly misses him. However, after a comment from the bus driver and seeing Pudge wander the streets, Danny stops the bus and secretly invites Sawyer, Woolie, Tillie, Cranston, Frances and T.W. to the Lil' Ark Angel premiere. During the event, Danny evades Max and sends him flying away on a deflating Darla balloon. At the screening's end, he calls the audience's attention and convinces his friends not to give up on their dreams no matter what the humans have said or done. The animals put on a musical performance that is drastically enhanced by Darla's covert sabotage attempts, entertaining and impressing the audience. During the standing ovation, an enraged Darla admits responsibility for the flood, inadvertently exposing herself to the public and irrevocably disgracing her. Danny and Sawyer admit their feelings for each other and the animals achieve their dreams for larger roles.

== Voice cast ==
- Scott Bakula as Danny, an ambitious, optimistically naïve, yet well-meaning orange tabby cat.
- Jasmine Guy as Sawyer, a beautiful yet jaded and sarcastic Turkish Angora cat secretary, and Danny's love interest.
  - Natalie Cole provides her singing vocals.
- Ashley Peldon as Darla Dimple, a spoiled and ornery human child star who maintains a sweet, innocent facade.
  - Lindsay Ridgeway provides her singing vocals.
- Kathy Najimy as Tillie Hippo, an optimistic hippopotamus.
- Betty Lou Gerson as Frances Albacore, a sarcastic fish.
- Hal Holbrook as Cranston Goat, an elderly, cranky goat.
- Don Knotts as T.W. Turtle, a neurotic, superstitious turtle.
  - Rick Logan provides his singing vocals.
- John Rhys-Davies as Woolie the Mammoth, an aging Asian elephant who is an aspiring composer but portrays the mascot for Mammoth Pictures.
- Matthew Herried as Peabo "Pudge" Pudgemyer, a small penguin who befriends Danny.
- George Kennedy as L.B. Mammoth, the human head of Mammoth Pictures.
- René Auberjonois as Flanigan, the human film director of Li'l Ark Angel.
- Mark Dindal as Max, Darla's gargantuan valet.
- Frank Welker as Farley Wink, a human agent for animals and Sawyer's boss.
- David Johansen as a bus driver

== Production ==
=== Development ===
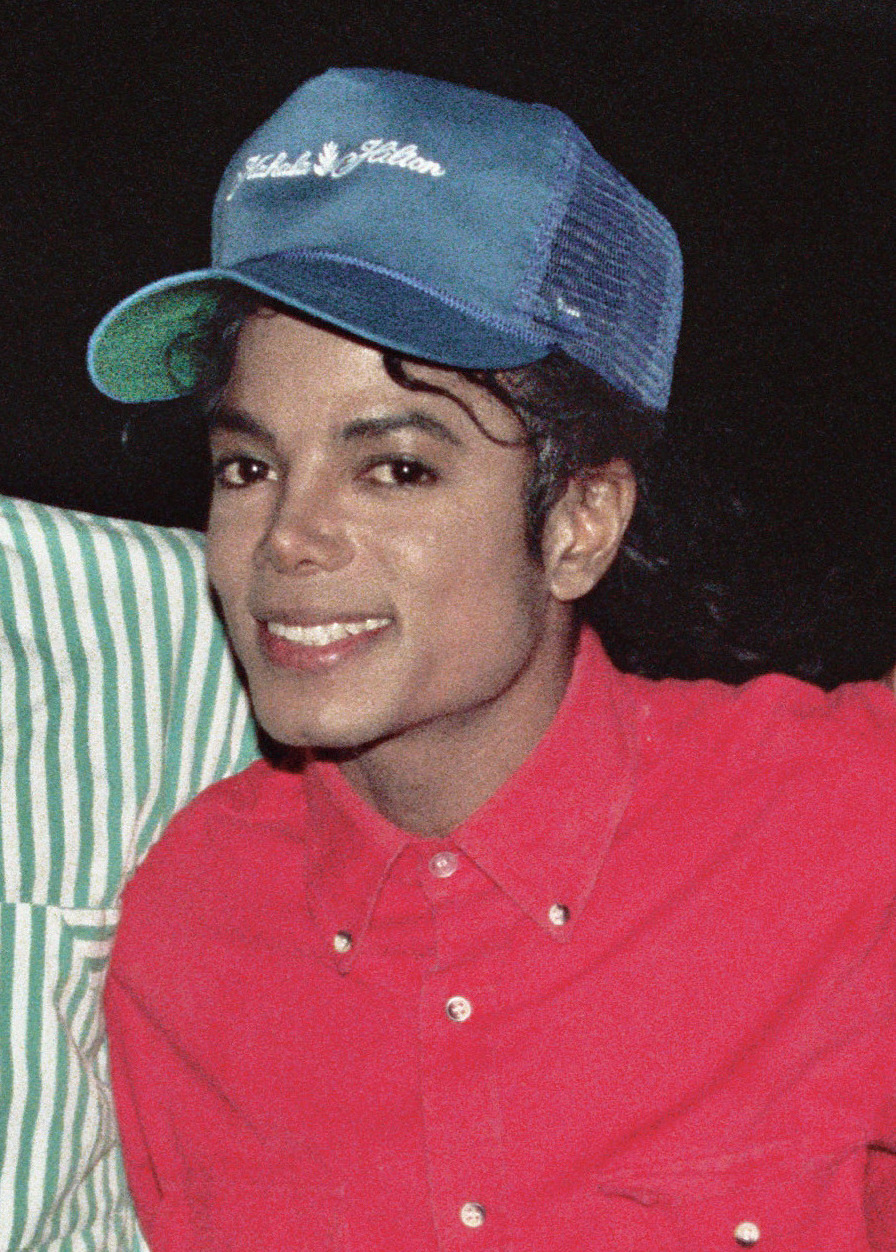
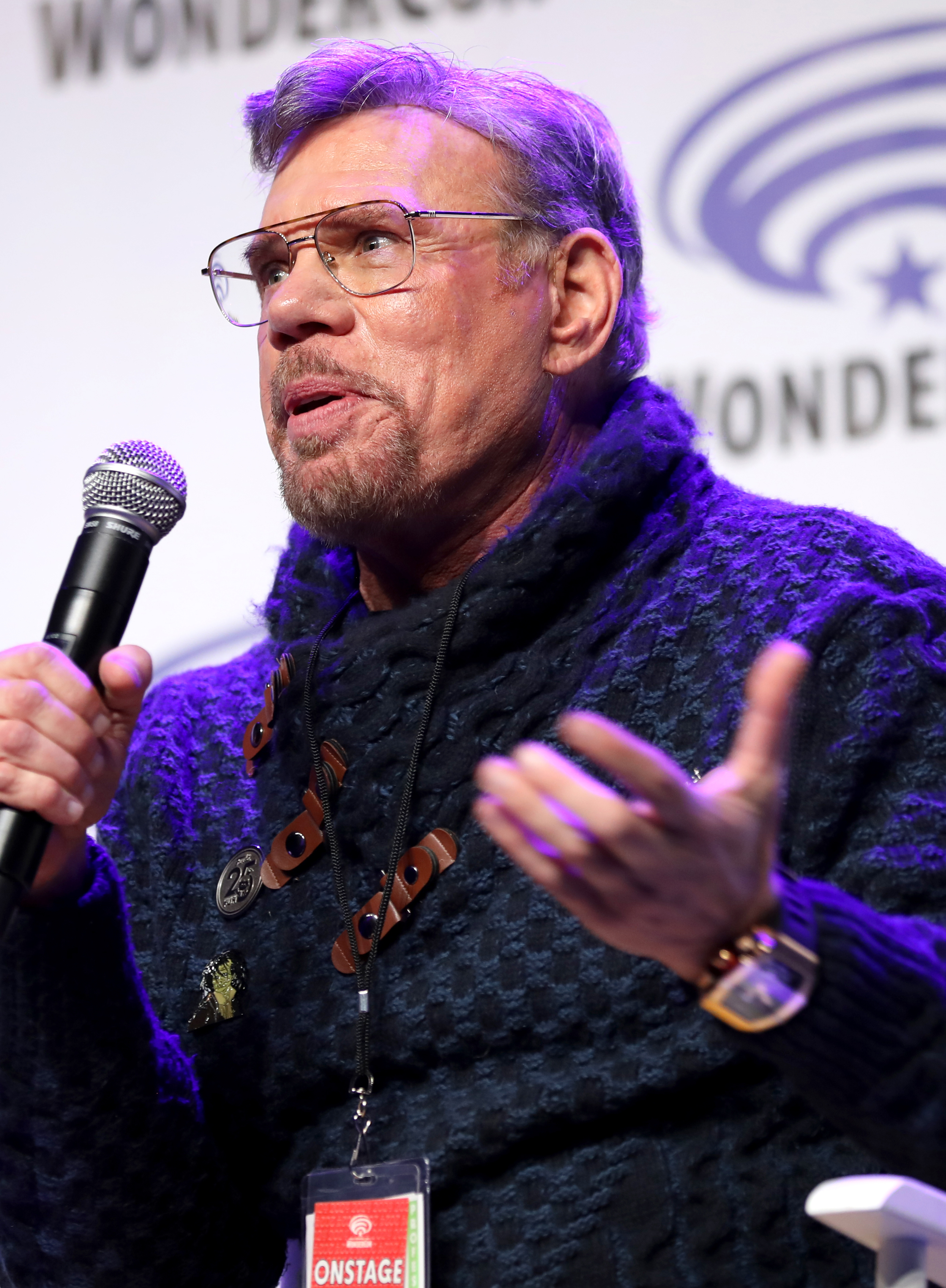
Cats Don't Dance originated as a proposed film collaboration between Michael Jackson (pictured here in 1988) and David Kirschner (pictured here in 2024).

In October 1991, Ted Turner's namesake company Turner Broadcasting System announced it had acquired Hanna-Barbera for $320 million. Two years prior, Carl Lindner Jr. recruited David Kirschner, who had headed his own production company and created the original story concept for An American Tail (1986) with Steven Spielberg.

In March 1993, Kirschner and Michael Jackson negotiated with 20th Century Fox to establish a production company specializing in live-action and animated films. Meanwhile, Jackson would enter into the exclusive, three-year agreement in ten months, following the expiration of his first-look deal for Nation Films at Columbia Pictures. Initially a hybrid live-action/CGI animated film, Jackson was intended to act, produce, and consult on the music and choreography. By November 1994, it was implied that Jackson was no longer involved in the film.

Gene Kelly was the choreography consultant. The production staff met Kelly three of four times, socializing about approaching musicals and the conception of older musicals. Painting service for the animation was finished by John Whitney's USAnimation.

=== Concept and writing ===
The first script for the film was completed by June 1993, which featured animated depictions of multiple celebrities from the Golden Age of Hollywood. Another script included four non-anthropomorphic stray cats living in the sets and studio backlots. The final screenplay was inspired by a story from executive producer Sandy Russell Gartin. The production pitched the concept in multiple variations from featuring a non-speaking animal to a universe with animals and humans.

During production, management at Turner Feature Animation changed repeatedly and each member attempted to revise the film's concept drastically. One executive suggested updating the film's setting to the 1950s and include rock-and-roll music in the middle of the film.

=== Cast ===
In May 1994, it was announced that the film would feature the voices from Natalie Cole, Scott Bakula, Kathy Najimy, Ashley Peldon, Ed Asner, Hal Holbrook, John Rhys-Davies, and Don Knotts. Asner's voice was not included in the final film. On February 5, 1995, Parade revealed that Bakula was doing the voice for the character Danny. On May 17, 1995, The Hamilton Spectator confirmed that Knotts would be the voice actor for T.W. Turtle.

On June 10, 1996, The Patriot-News reported that René Auberjonois did the voices for the film. Dindal's portrayal of Max was initially a temporary scratch track. Dindal wanted Max to be voiced by a professional actor; he kept his vocals in as the film ran out of money.

=== Music ===
At the beginning of development, Cats Don't Dance was going to include songs from older Metro-Goldwyn-Mayer films and composed by Jackson. David Shire and Richard Maltby Jr., the songwriting team for the Broadway musicals Baby and Big, also hired to compose and write five songs for the film. By May 1994, they were replaced by Randy Newman, who wrote many songs for the film. The film's opening and end credits song "Our Time Has Come" was composed by Martin Page, and was performed by James Ingram and Carnie Wilson. For the film, Newman was awarded the Annie Award for Best Music in an Animated Feature.

Songs included in the film
No.	Title	Performer(s)	Length
1.	"Our Time Has Come"	James Ingram & Carnie Wilson	3:49
2.	"Danny's Arrival Song"	Scott Bakula	3:06
3.	"Little Boat on the Sea"	Lindsay Ridgeway	1:37
4.	"Animal Jam"	Bakula	5:09
5.	"Big and Loud (Pt. 1)"	Ridgeway	1:40
6.	"Big and Loud (Pt. 2)"	Ridgeway	1:33
7.	"Tell Me Lies"	Natalie Cole	3:17
8.	"Nothing's Gonna Stop Us Now"	Bakula, Cole, Rick Logan, Hal Holbrook, Betty Lou Gerson and Kathy Najimy	3:14
9.	"I Do Believe (End Credits Theme)"	Will Downing	4:22

== Release ==
Cats Don't Dance was first pitched to 20th Century Fox and Columbia Pictures. Then-Turner subsidiary New Line Cinema also expressed interest in releasing the film. However, when Turner Broadcasting was merged with Warner Bros.' parent company Time Warner for $7.5 billion, New Line placed the film in turnaround in 1996, where the film's ownership fell into Warner Bros.

Although originally scheduled to be released in the fall of 1996, Cats Don't Dance was theatrically released on March 26, 1997 by Warner Bros. through their Family Entertainment label. Pullet Surprise, a newly produced Looney Tunes short film featuring Foghorn Leghorn, preceded the film's theatrical release. A merchandise campaign was planned but failed.

=== Home media ===
Cats Don't Dance had its first home video release by Warner Home Video on VHS and LaserDisc on August 19, 1997. To promote the release, Warner partnered with Continental Airlines, in which the buyer received an in-pack coupon worth $125 in savings on a Continental flight. A $2 instant savings coupon with the additional purchase of either Dennis the Menace (1993), Batman: Mask of the Phantasm, Richie Rich (1994), or the 25th anniversary edition of Willy Wonka and the Chocolate Factory was also included. The film had also its first DVD release on September 3, 2002, in a pan-and-scan format with bonus features. It was later released on Blu-ray in September 2023.

== Reception ==
=== Box office ===
With failed marketing and a few promotional tie-ins, Cats Don't Dance was a box-office failure. In the U.S. and Canada, the film only grossed $3.5 million against its $32 million production budget. Dindal told Animation World Magazine: "I think very objectively [Warner Bros.] looked at it and decided there wouldn't be a market for it. It wasn't something they responded to, they didn't think people would eat it up."

=== Critical response ===
Despite being a box-office failure, Cats Don't Dance received generally positive reviews from critics, with some reviewers stating that the film surpassed the artistry of Disney's animated films. On the review aggregator website Rotten Tomatoes, 73% of 22 critics' reviews are positive, with an average rating of 6.6/10. The website's consensus reads: "Cats Don't Dance, but they should easily entertain all-ages audiences thanks to some colorful animation, sharp humor, and a catchy soundtrack." Metacritic, which uses a weighted average, assigned the film a score of 62 out of 100, based on 21 critics, indicating "generally favorable" reviews. Audiences polled by CinemaScore gave the film an average grade of "B" on an A+ to F scale.

Todd McCarthy of Variety wrote: "Decked out with sharp and colorful design work, some well-drawn characters and six snappy Randy Newman tunes, this first entry from Turner Feature Animation goes down very easily but lacks a hook". Roger Ebert of the Chicago Sun-Times gave the film three stars out of four. He wrote the film "is not compelling and it's not a breakthrough, but on its own terms, it works well. Whether this will appeal to kids is debatable; the story involves a time and a subject they're not much interested in. But the songs by Randy Newman are catchy, the look is bright, the spirits are high and fans of Hollywood's golden age might find it engaging". John Petrakis, reviewing for the Chicago Tribune, noted Cats Don't Dance would appeal more for adults than children, but provided a good moral lesson on prejudice. He further wrote the film has "the sharp irreverence of the brilliant Who Framed Roger Rabbit. There are plenty of clever asides and witty one-liners, not to mention a few terrific supporting characters".

Lawrence Van Gelder of The New York Times summarized in his review: "While the animated characters, bright colors and an appealing Randy Newman score may keep the children content, Cats Don't Dance is no saccharine fantasy. Its Hollywood references and dark satire constitute its real strengths". Jack Mathews, reviewing for the Los Angeles Times, described the film as a "startling miscalculation". He next wrote: "It has lots of cute animals, some jaunty Randy Newman songs and solid, if uninspired, animation work. But blending parody and nostalgia about an era half a century removed from the lives of the core audience seems a foolish indulgence". Rita Kempley of The Washington Post wrote the film was "colorful, but unimaginatively drawn". Also from The Washington Post, Jane Horwitz felt children "won't get the references to old movies or stars like Bette Davis and Clark Gable. Still, the action (however confusing), the music and the characters should hold even toddlers for a while".

=== Awards and nominations ===
Cats Don't Dance was nominated for eight Annie Awards, and won two for Best Animated Feature and Best Music in a Feature Production. It was the first non-Disney winner in either category. Despite the mostly positive reception, Cats Don't Dance was one of several recipients for the Founders Award from the 1997 Stinkers Bad Movie Awards. They cited the film for being "loud, unfunny, and completely over the heads of its intended audience".

Year	Award	Category	Recipients	Result
1997	Saturn Award	Best Home Video Release	Cats Don't Dance	Won
1997	Annie Award	Best Animated Feature	Cats Don't Dance	Won
1997	Annie Award	Music in a Feature Production	Randy Newman (songs)	Won
1997	Annie Award	Music in a Feature Production	Steve Goldstein (score)	Nominated
1997	Annie Award	Directing in a Feature Production	Mark Dindal	Nominated
1997	Annie Award	Producing in a Feature Production	David Kirschner; Paul Gertz	Nominated
1997	Annie Award	Effects Animation	John Allan Armstrong	Nominated
1997	Annie Award	Effects Animation	Bob Simmons	Nominated
1997	Annie Award	Character Animation in a Feature Production	Frans Vischer (Darla Dimple and Max)	Nominated
1997	Awards Circuit Community Awards	Best Animated Feature	Cats Don't Dance	Nominated
1997	Blockbuster Entertainment Awards	Favorite Animated Family Movie	Cats Don't Dance	Nominated
1998	Golden Reel Awards	Best Sound Editing - Animated Feature	Cats Don't Dance	Nominated
1998	Golden Reel Awards	Best Sound Editing - Music Animation	Cats Don't Dance	Nominated
2013	Golden Reel Awards	Best Sound Editing - Animated Feature Film, Domestic and Foreign	Richard Partlow	Nominated
1998	OFTA Film Award	Best Animated Picture	Bill Bloom; Paul Gertz; David Kirschner	Nominated
1998	Young Artist Award	Best Performance in a Voiceover - TV or Film - Young Actress	Ashley Peldon	Nominated

== Sources ==
- Sito, Tom (2013). "The Cartoon of Animation Industry". Moving Innovation: A History of Computer Animation (Hardcover ed.). Cambridge, Massachusetts: The MIT Press. p. 231. ISBN 978-0-262-01909-5.
