= Killing of Logan Marr =

Child abuse case in Maine, United States

Logan Lynn Marr (October 14, 1995 – January 31, 2001) was an American girl who died while in foster care.

Marr's mother was Christy M. Baker (a.k.a. Christy Marr, later known as Christy Reposa, and Christy Darling). She was a teenager at the time of Logan's first birthday. In 1996, Baker's mother, Kathy Baker, reported her daughter to Maine's Child Protective Services (CPS), managed by Maine's Department of Human Services (DHS), arguing that her daughter did not have the maturity to raise a child. CPS first took the girl away in August 1998, and she had three different foster families. Logan was taken in and out of CPS custody; DHS had asked Baker to stop associating with her mother and asked for any boyfriends of Baker to be cleared with the agency, which Baker complied with. She herself was never accused of directly abusing the child.

Maine CPS caseworker Sally Ann Schofield, of Chelsea, Maine, took Logan Marr as a foster child, along with her sister, Bailey. Even though DHS requests that caseworkers themselves do not serve as foster parents, Schofield wished to have a female child. Schofield left the agency in January 2001.

On January 31, 2001, Logan Marr was found dead, aged 5 in Schofield's house. Schofield initially stated that Marr died of trauma in an accident, but authorities found that she had been duct-taped and died of suffocation. Schofield was convicted of manslaughter in 2002, although the judge found that the death was not willful. She was sentenced to twenty years in prison. She was incarcerated in the Maine Correctional Center in Windham, Maine, and was to be released on probation on April 25, 2017. The custody of Bailey had been returned to Baker after Logan's death.

Marr's death resulted in the foster care system of Maine directly reducing non-family placements and prioritizing placing children with other family members in the event the state decides their immediate family should not care for them. National Coalition for Child Protection Reform described Marr's death as a pivotal factor for reform of foster care in Maine and other U.S. states.
