= Advocates for Children in Therapy =

U.S. advocacy group

Advocates for Children in Therapy (ACT) is a U.S. advocacy group founded by Jean Mercer and opposed to attachment therapy and related treatments. The organization opposes a number of psychotherapeutic techniques which are potentially or actually harmful to the children who undergo them. The group's mission is to provide advocacy by "raising general public awareness of the dangers and cruelty" of practices related to attachment therapy. According to the group, "ACT works to mobilize parents, professionals, private and governmental regulators, prosecutors, juries, and legislators to end the physical torture and emotional abuse that is Attachment Therapy."

== Opposition to attachment therapy ==
Attachment therapy is an ambiguous term with no precise professional meaning but popularly used to describe controversial, non-mainstream "treatments" for children allegedly suffering from attachment disorder, in itself an ambiguous term. (American Professional Society on the Abuse of Children (APSAC)), 2006, p78) There are many variants, for example "holding therapy", "compression therapy", "corrective attachment therapy", "the Evergreen model", "holding time", "rage-reduction therapy", and somewhat erroneously, "rebirthing therapy".

ACT states that attachment therapy frequently involves "the imposition of boundary violations—most often coercive restraint—and verbal abuse on a child, usually for hours at a time ... typically, the child is put in a lap hold with the arms pinned down, or alternatively an adult lies on top of a child lying prone on the floor" and as "a growing, underground movement for the 'treatment' of children who pose disciplinary problems to their parents or caregivers." The group further notes that attachment therapy "almost always involves extremely confrontational, often hostile confrontation of a child by a therapist or parent (sometimes both). Restraint of the child by more powerful adult(s) is considered an essential part of the confrontation" and refers to attachment therapy as "the worst quackery in our nation today."

ACT has listed seven criteria for operationally defining attachment therapy:

"For our purposes, we have identified several distinguishing characteristics, any one of which qualifies a practice to be called Attachment Therapy:

- "Practices, teaches or recommends restraint (or other violations of interpersonal boundaries) for an allegedly therapeutic purpose. The things mentioned are often deliberately confrontational and intrusive.
- "Principally treats, or is concerned with, a condition of 'Attachment Disorder' (distinct from the DSM-recognized diagnosis of Reactive Attachment Disorder), and assesses for that condition using unvalidated diagnostic tools, or uses no tools at all for objective assessment.
- "Practices or recommends treatment based on a belief in the efficacy of any of the following: re-traumatization; catharsis, especially through expression of rage, fear, sadness, or other 'negative' emotion; recapitulation (re-enactment, re-living, or 're-doing') of stages of development; or repatterning of the brain.
- "Adheres to unvalidated notions about child development or attachment, especially the so-called 'Attachment Cycle' (a.k.a. Bonding Cycle, Need Cycle, Rage Cycle). Though reference may be made to the Attachment Theory, pioneered by John Bowlby and Mary Ainsworth, Attachment Therapy shares very little with that empirical work (and indeed runs counter to it in almost all important respects).
- "Claims that AT practices are safe and efficacious when there is a near complete lack of scientific support.
- "Practices or teaches harsh parenting and respite methods, based principally upon combinations of deprivation, isolation or humiliation for the child.
- "Uncritically recommends materials (such as websites, books, videos, lectures, and conference presentations) which do any of the above."

ACT also challenges the diagnosis of attachment disorder, stating, "A large fringe element of pseudoscientific psychotherapists—Attachment Therapists (AT)—have invented the dubious, unrecognized diagnosis of 'Attachment Disorder' (AD) and its cure. AD is thought to be a child's inability to form a close, loving relationship with his caregiver, typically because of early childhood abuse or neglect. Many, if not most, undesirable behaviors seen in childhood supposedly stem from AD."

ACT has advocated for the elimination of attachment therapy and specifically criticizes the referral of children for government-funded attachment therapy by courts and state workers, referring to such practices as "state-sponsored torture".

== Activities ==
The group reports that some of its members had been directly involved in prosecution of those responsible for the death of Candace Newmaker in 2001 before the group's formation the following year. In 2003, a book on that case was published, Attachment Therapy on Trial: The Torture and Death of Candace Newmaker.

ACT entered a statement into the record of a Congressional hearing into a child starvation case.

The ACT website also reports on cases which it identifies as involving elements of attachment therapy, including some for which its members assisted authorities.

== See also ==
- Attachment therapy
- Attachment disorder
- Reactive attachment disorder
- Candace Newmaker
