= Martha G. Welch =

American physician and researcher

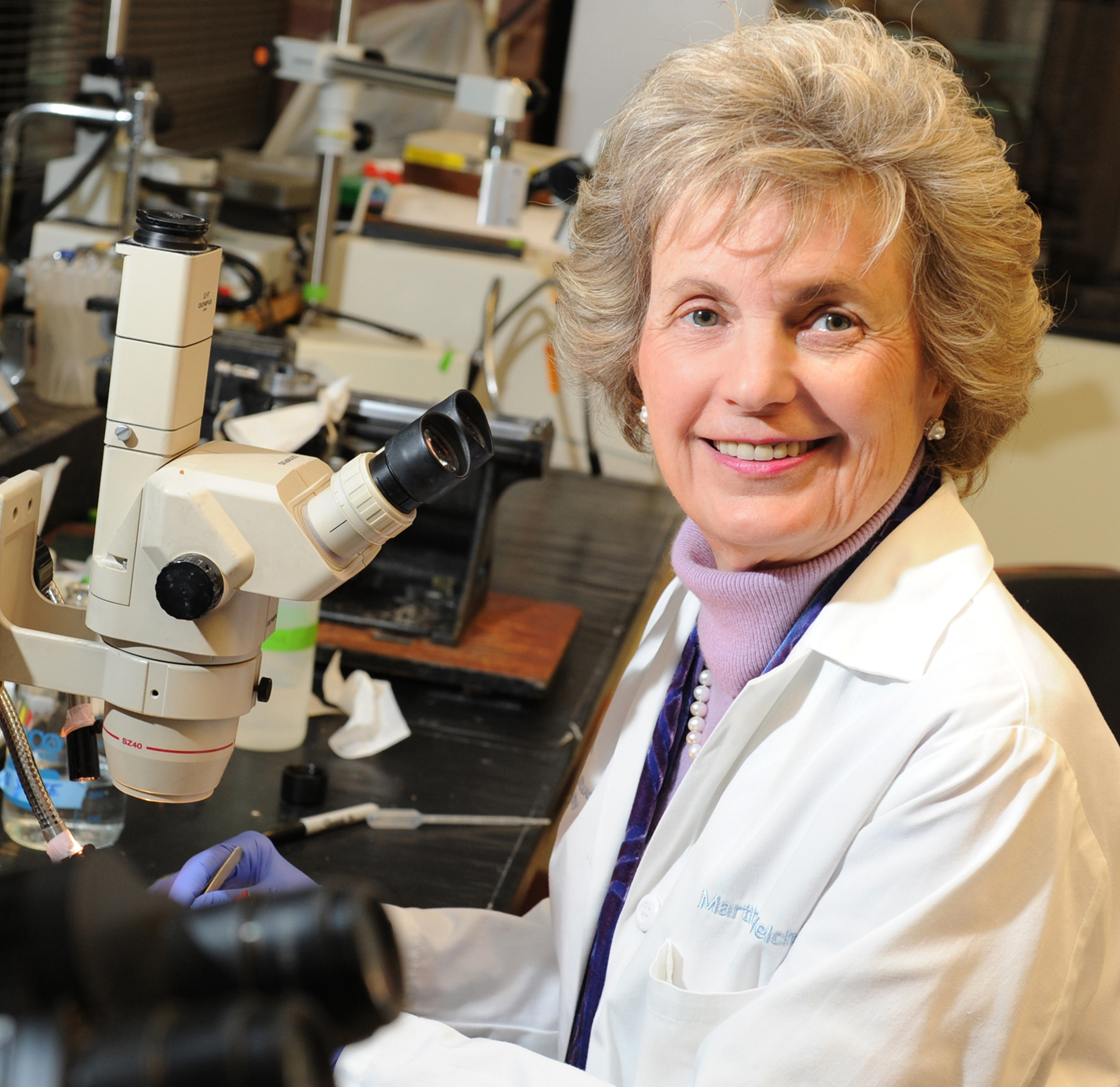
- Welch at Columbia University Medical Center in 2014
- Born: Martha Grace Welch; Buffalo, New York
- Citizenship: U.S.
- Known for: Promotion of parent-child bonding
- Partner: Robert J. Ludwig
- Awards: 2014 Gold Medal for Meritorious Service to Columbia University, College of Surgeons & Physicians, 2013 Physicians & Surgeons Alumni Lifetime Learning Award
- Scientific career
- Fields: Clinical psychiatry, Neonatal and Infant Development, Child Development

Martha G. Welch is an American physician and researcher specializing in the fields of infant and child development. Welch currently serves as a Professor of Psychiatry in Pediatrics and in Pathology & Cell Biology at Columbia University Irving Medical Center. Welch's writing and research focuses on the posited benefits of prolonged close physical contact and eye contact between mothers and children.

== Education and career ==
Martha Grace Welch was born in Buffalo, New York and raised in Eggertsville, New York. Her paternal family is descended from the founders of the Welch's Grape Juice Company.

After earning a Bachelor of Arts degree in 1966 from New York University, Welch attended Columbia University's College of Physicians and Surgeons, where she earned her medical degree in 1971. Following medical school, Welch completed a residency in General Psychiatry (1972–1974) and a Fellowship in Child Psychiatry (1974–1977) at the Albert Einstein College of Medicine. She became a Diplomate of the American Board of Psychiatry and Neurology on November 30, 1977.

From 1975 to 1997, Welch operated a private practice, specializing in the treatment of emotional, behavioral and developmental disorders, including autism, maintaining offices in New York City and Greenwich, CT. In 1997, she joined the faculty at Columbia University Medical Center's College of Physicians and Surgeons in the Department of Psychiatry.

In 2008 Welch was jointly appointed in Columbia University's Department of Pathology and Cell Biology. In 2010 Welch was jointly appointed in Columbia University's Department of Pediatrics, where she is conducting research on Family Nurture Intervention in the neonatal intensive care unit of New York-Presbyterian Hospital. In 2013, Welch became co-director of the Nurture Science Program in the Department of Pediatrics.

Welch published the book "Holding Time” in 1988. The book promoted the use of prolonged parent-child embrace, a physical technique to increase communication and emotional connection between parent and child. Welch claimed the technique could lower the risk of autism in children, for which she was later criticized.

== Research ==
At Columbia University Medical Center, she began preclinical research investigating secretin and oxytocin in the brain and the effects of combined oxytocin/secretin on an animal model of inflammatory bowel disease. In 2004 she began a collaboration with Michael D. Gershon M.D. pioneering research on the role of oxytocin in the gut. Welch and Gershon later established the Columbia University Brain Gut Initiative to further their understanding the mechanisms of nurture and they condition the brain-gut axis.

== Awards and honors ==
- 2019 Awarded Distinguished Fellowship of the American Psychiatric Association
- 2014 Gold Medal for Meritorious Service to Columbia University. College of Physicians & Surgeons
- 2013 P&S Alumni Lifetime Learning Award
- 2011 Columbia University Alumni Medal for Meritorious Service
- 1995 Middlebury College Distinguished Alumni Award

== Personal life ==
Welch lives in New York City with her partner, Robert J. Ludwig, the managing director of the Nurture Science Program at Columbia University Medical Center's Department of Pediatrics. She has one son, and two grandsons living in Houston, Texas.
