= Death of Candace Newmaker =

2000 US attempted attachment therapy death

- Undated photo of Candace Newmaker
- Date: April 10, 2000
- Duration: 70 minutes
- Type: Death during attempted attachment therapy
- Cause: Asphyxia
- Perpetrators: Connell Watkins & Julie Ponder

Candace Elizabeth Newmaker (born Candace Tiara Elmore; November 19, 1989 – April 19, 2000) was a 10-year-old child who was killed during a 70-minute attachment therapy session performed by four unlicensed therapists, purported to treat reactive attachment disorder. The treatment, during which Newmaker was suffocated, included a rebirthing script. She was wrapped in flannel to represent a womb and told to free herself while four adults used their hands and feet to push down on Candace's body, suffocating her.

== Early life and childhood ==
Candace was born in Lincolnton, North Carolina, on November 19, 1989, to a teenage mother and an abusive father, Angela and Todd Elmore. These circumstances influenced the way she grew up. At a young age, she and her younger brother Michael and sister Chelsea were removed from the home for neglect and separated by social services. When she was five, her parents' parental rights were terminated. Two years later she was adopted by Jeane Elizabeth Newmaker, a single woman and pediatric nurse practitioner in Durham, North Carolina.

Within months of the adoption, Jeane began taking Candace to a psychiatrist, complaining about her behavior and attitude at home. Though Candace was treated with medications, Jeane reported that Candace's behavior got worse during the ensuing two years, a period supposedly including her playing with matches and also killing goldfish.

== Attachment therapy and death ==
Candace and Jeane Newmaker traveled to Evergreen, Colorado, in April 2000, for a $7,000 two-week "intensive" session of attachment therapy with Connell Watkins (who was without license) upon a referral from William Goble, a licensed psychologist in North Carolina.

Candace died during the second week of the intensive sessions with Watkins during what has been called a "rebirthing" session. Participating in the fatal session as therapists were Watkins and Julie Ponder, also without a license, along with Candace's "therapeutic foster parents", Brita St. Clair, Jack McDaniel, and Jeane Newmaker.

Following the script for that day's treatment, Candace was wrapped in a flannel sheet and covered with pillows to simulate a womb or birth canal and was told to fight her way out of it, with the apparent expectation that the experience would help her "attach" to her adoptive mother. Four of the adults (weighing a combined total of 673 pounds or 305.2 kilograms) used their hands and feet to push on Candace's head, chest, and 70-pound body to resist her attempts to free herself, while she complained, pleaded, and even screamed for help and air, unable to escape from the sheet. Candace stated eleven times during the session that she was dying, to which Ponder responded, "Go ahead. Die right now, for real. For real". Twenty minutes into the session, Candace had vomited and excreted inside of the sheet; she was nonetheless kept restrained within.

Forty minutes into the session, Candace was asked if she wanted to be reborn. She faintly responded "no"; this would ultimately be her last word. To this, Ponder replied, "Quitter, quitter, quitter, quitter! Quit, quit, quit, quit. She's a quitter!" Jeane Newmaker, who said later she felt rejected by Candace's inability to be reborn, was asked by Watkins to leave the room, in order for Candace not to "pick up on (Jeane's) sorrow". Soon thereafter, Watkins requested the same of McDaniel and Brita St. Clair, leaving only herself and Ponder in the room with Candace. After talking for five minutes, the two unwrapped Candace and found that she was motionless, blue in the fingertips and lips, and not breathing. Upon seeing this, Watkins declared, "Oh there she is; she's sleeping in her vomit", whereupon Newmaker, who had been watching on a monitor in another room, rushed into the room, remarked on Candace's color, and began CPR while Watkins called 9-1-1. When paramedics arrived ten minutes later, McDaniel told them that Candace had been left alone for five minutes during a rebirthing session and was not breathing. The paramedics surmised that Candace had been unconscious and possibly not breathing for some time. Paramedics were able to restore the girl's pulse and she was flown by helicopter to a hospital in Denver; however, she was declared brain-dead the next day, April 19, as a consequence of asphyxia.

The entire fatal session, as well as ten hours of other sessions from the preceding days, had been videotaped as a matter of course with Watkins's treatment. All the videos were shown at the trial of Watkins and Ponder.

== Convictions and aftermath ==
A year later, Watkins and Ponder were tried and convicted of reckless child abuse resulting in death and received 16-year prison sentences. Brita St. Clair and Jack McDaniel, the therapeutic foster parents, pleaded guilty to criminally negligent child abuse and were given ten years' probation and 1,000 hours of community service in a plea bargain. The adoptive mother, Jeane Newmaker, a nurse practitioner, pleaded guilty to neglect and abuse charges and was given a four-year suspended sentence, after which the charges were expunged from her record. An appeal by Watkins against conviction and sentence failed. Watkins was paroled in June 2008, under "intense supervision" with restrictions on contact with children or counseling work, having served approximately seven years of her 16-year sentence.

The case was the motivation behind "Candace's Law" in Colorado and North Carolina, which outlawed dangerous re-enactments of the birth experience. The U.S. House of Representatives and Senate have separately passed resolutions urging similar actions in other states.

== See also ==
- Gravelle foster child abuse cases
- Attachment disorder
- Attachment therapy
- Advocates for Children in Therapy
- Reactive attachment disorder
