= Ruby Franke =

American vlogger and convicted child abuser (born 1982)

- Born: Ruby Griffiths; January 18, 1982 (age 44); Logan, Utah, U.S.
- Years active: 2015–2022
- Known for: YouTube, family vlogging, child abuse
- Spouse: Kevin Franke (m. 2000; div. 2025)
- Children: 6
- Status: Incarcerated
- Convictions: Aggravated child abuse (4 counts)
- Criminal charges: Aggravated child abuse (6 counts)
- Penalty: 4 to 60 years (30 year maximum to serve per Utah law)
- Accomplice: Jodi Hildebrandt

Details
- Victims: 6
- Country: U.S.
- Location: Springville, Utah
- Date apprehended: August 30, 2023
- Imprisoned at: Utah State Correctional Facility

Ruby Franke (née Griffiths; born January 18, 1982) is an American former family vlogger and convicted child abuser who ran the now defunct YouTube channel 8 Passengers. On August 30, 2023, Franke and her business partner Jodi Hildebrandt were arrested in Washington County, Utah, and charged with six counts of felony aggravated child abuse of two of Franke's children. Franke ultimately pleaded guilty to four counts and on February 20, 2024, was sentenced to serve between four and thirty years in prison.

== Career ==
In early 2015, Franke created a YouTube channel called 8 Passengers in which she documented her family life in Utah with her husband Kevin and their six children.

She originally posted five days a week at 6:00 a.m. As of June 2020, the channel had around 2.5 million subscribers and amassed 1 billion views.

Beginning in 2020, when one of the Franke children, a 15-year-old, said that he had been banned from his bedroom and made to sleep on a bean bag for seven months, viewers became concerned about his mother's disciplinary methods. On another occasion, her youngest daughter was sent to school without a packed lunch because Ruby believed her 6-year-old daughter was old enough to prepare, and be responsible for, her own lunch. When the school contacted her with concern over this, she refused to deliver a lunch for her daughter. Some of the other punishments Franke imposed included sending a child to a wilderness camp for troubled teens, threatening to behead a stuffed toy, and telling two of her children that Santa Claus would not be bringing them anything for Christmas that year because they were too "numb" to respond to other punishments. A Change.org petition was launched reporting perceived child abuse and neglect. The Franke parents posted in defense of the discipline, saying the incidents had been taken out of context. The 8 Passengers YouTube channel declined in popularity in 2021.

In 2022, the Frankes separated, and Kevin moved out of the house. After her YouTube channel was suspended that year, Ruby began working as a mental health coach at ConneXions, a company run by Jodi Hildebrandt, a counselor. They launched a new video channel together called ConneXions in 2022, and created a joint Instagram account called Moms of Truth, offering parenting classes. Neighbors and the Frankes' oldest daughter, Shari, a college student, called authorities to check on the latter's siblings after observing that their mother often left the children alone at home. In 2023, YouTube terminated the 8 Passengers and ConneXions accounts and banned Ruby from creating new accounts.

== Arrest and charges ==
On August 30, 2023, Franke and Hildebrandt were arrested in Ivins, Utah, and two days later, both were charged with six counts of aggravated child abuse, a felony. According to a statement from the Santa Clara-Ivins Public Safety Department, the arrests were triggered after Franke's twelve-year-old son, who appeared emaciated and had "open wounds and duct tape around the extremities", had escaped through a window of Hildebrandt's house and asked at a neighboring house for food and water. Emergency services found Franke's ten-year-old daughter in the house, also malnourished; both children were taken to a hospital, where the boy was treated for severe malnourishment and "deep lacerations from being tied up with rope". A search of the house found evidence "consistent with the markings" on the twelve-year-old, and the Utah Division of Child and Family Services took the boy and girl and two more of Franke's children into care. Police later reported that, according to the boy, cayenne pepper and honey had been used to dress his wounds.

Franke and Hildebrandt were held without bail. Hildebrandt surrendered her license as a counselor pending resolution of the court case and a disciplinary investigation. After her arrest, YouTube suspended Franke from the platform, also suspending two channels that were linked to her.

On December 18, 2023, Franke pleaded guilty to four counts of aggravated child abuse. She later pleaded not guilty to two other counts. The factual basis mentioned an incident of Franke forcing her son to work outdoors over several weeks with inadequate protection, resulting in severe sunburns, and claims that the children were possessed. Franke agreed to serve a prison sentence and to serve her respective sentences consecutively rather than concurrently. Franke was expected to testify against Hildebrandt in Hildebrandt's upcoming trial, but Hildebrandt separately pleaded guilty to four counts of felony aggravated child abuse on December 27, with two charges dropped as part of another plea deal. On February 20, 2024, Franke received four consecutive sentences of between one and fifteen years' imprisonment, meaning she must serve a minimum term of four years. Although the maximum term that could be imposed for all sentences would be 60 years, the Utah Code dictates that the time served by a defendant upon whom consecutive sentences are imposed must not exceed 30 years, except in circumstances of life imprisonment or the death penalty. Under Utah's indeterminate sentencing scheme, her exact term will be determined by the Utah Board of Pardons and Parole.

== Lawsuit ==
On January 22, 2025, Michael Tilleman, the husband of a former ConneXions Classroom client, filed a lawsuit in federal court against Hildebrandt and Franke for business fraud and promoting a "methodology that encouraged child abuse among their clients". Examples of the claims made by Tilleman included the two women "engag[ing] in a racketeering enterprise by advertising and selling fraudulent services and encouraging others to perpetuate illegal and harmful acts — specifically child abuse, child torture, and psychological abuse" and that the concepts taught in the classes "ultimately led children to 'extreme danger'".

== Personal life ==
=== Religion ===
The Frankes are members of The Church of Jesus Christ of Latter-day Saints. Ruby and Jodi Hildebrandt both said they believed that the abuse they committed was justified by their religious beliefs. Both had made claims that the abuse was to teach children the proper way to repent for their sins and to expel evil from their bodies. In a recorded phone call from Jodi Hildebrandt, she compares herself to a biblical martyr and says that she is going to prison unjustly, aware of the power of her example.

=== Family ===
Franke's three sisters are also family vloggers. They disassociated themselves from her actions in a joint statement and later in individual videos.

In November 2023, after the couple had been separated for more than a year, Kevin Franke filed for divorce. Kevin later sued Hildebrandt over the abuse of his children. The divorce was finalized on March 20, 2025.

== Depiction in media ==
Franke's case was depicted in the 2024 Lifetime movie Mormon Mom Gone Wrong: The Ruby Franke Story as part of its "Ripped from the Headlines" feature films starring Emilie Ullerup as Ruby Franke and Heather Locklear as Jodi Hildebrandt. The movie was negatively perceived upon announcement by her children, with Franke's eldest daughter Shari stating that they were not contacted about the movie, none of the proceeds from the movie would go to the younger siblings in question, and that releasing the film would only hurt the victims more than they already were hurt beforehand.

On January 7, 2025, Shari Franke published a memoir detailing her experience as Franke's oldest daughter, titled The House of My Mother: A Daughter's Quest for Freedom.

Hulu released a docuseries, entitled Devil in the Family: The Fall of Ruby Franke, which premiered on February 27, 2025. Franke's ex-husband and two eldest children participated in the production of the series. Investigation Discovery released Ruby & Jodi: A Cult of Sin and Influence on September 1, 2025. In December 2025, Netflix released a documentary, entitled Evil Influencer: The Jodi Hildebrandt Story, featuring Franke.

== See also ==
- DaddyOFive
- Fantastic Adventures scandal
- Hart family murders
- Michael and Sharen Gravelle
- Turpin case
