= Jodi Hildebrandt =

American counselor and child abuser (born 1969)

- Born: Jodi Nan Hildebrandt; 1969 (age 56–57); Tucson, Arizona, U.S.
- Education: Brigham Young University (BA); University of Utah (MA)
- Occupations: Counselor; parenting coach; YouTuber
- Years active: 2005–2024
- Status: Incarcerated
- Convictions: Aggravated child abuse (4 counts)
- Criminal charges: Aggravated child abuse (6 counts)
- Penalty: 4 to 60 years (30 year maximum per Utah law) (Note: Each of the four counts Hildebrandt was convicted on carried a term of 1 to 15 years' imprisonment, which were ordered to be served consecutively. The minimum amount of time Hildebrandt must serve is therefore 4 years, and, absent any superseding legislation, the maximum amount of time would be 60 years; however, the Utah Code dictates that the time served by a defendant upon whom consecutive sentences (except those of life imprisonment or the death penalty) are imposed must not exceed 30 years.)
- Accomplice: Ruby Franke

Details
- Victims: 6
- Date apprehended: August 30, 2023
- Imprisoned at: Utah State Correctional Facility

Jodi Nan Hildebrandt (born 1969) is an American former counselor and YouTuber who was convicted of child abuse in 2023. On August 30, 2023, Hildebrandt and her business partner Ruby Franke were arrested in Washington County, Utah, and charged with six counts of aggravated child abuse of two of Franke's children. Hildebrandt pleaded guilty to four counts, and was sentenced to between four and 30 years in prison on February 20, 2024.

== Early life and education ==
Jodi Hildebrandt was born to Jay D. Hildebrandt and Florence Haynie in 1969. Her parents were devout members of the Church of Jesus Christ of Latter-day Saints. Her father was a pilot with the United States Air Force.

Hildebrandt attended Canyon del Oro High School and played on its girls' basketball team. She was part of the high school's 1986–87 team, which finished with a 28–0 record and captured the school's first state championship in girls' basketball.

After graduating, Hildebrandt attended Ricks College and played on its women's basketball team for the 1987–88 season. In 1988, she transferred to Utah Valley Community College, which she attended for one year. She competed in the Miss Orem pageant in 1990.

In 1996, Hildebrandt graduated from Brigham Young University with a Bachelor of Arts in English language and literature. In 2003, she graduated from the University of Utah with a Master of Arts in educational psychology. Her master's thesis was titled "Experiences of Latter-day Saints women and how their culture influences their manifestations of sexuality."

== Counseling career ==
In 2005, Hildebrandt became a licensed counselor in Utah. In 2007, she founded the relationship and business counseling business Connexions (styled ConneXions) in Orem, Utah. In 2012, she became the director of LifeStar Utah County, a franchisee of a national company based in Utah that specializes in psychiatric and psychological treatment of pornography and sex addiction.

In 2012, Hildebrandt's license was put on probation for 18 months after she "disclosed sensitive confidential information" of a former client to The Church of Jesus Christ of Latter-day Saints and Brigham Young University between 2008 and 2010, according to Utah Department of Commerce's Division of Occupational and Professional Licensing documents. The Church of Jesus Christ of Latter-day Saints announced that, because of the case, Hildebrandt was no longer on its Family Services' referral list.

Hildebrandt was a business partner of family YouTube vlogger Ruby Franke. They launched a YouTube channel called ConneXions together in 2022, and created a joint Instagram account called Moms of Truth, offering parenting classes.

As a result of Hildebrandt's criminal convictions, the Utah Department of Commerce's Division of Professional Licensing revoked her clinical mental health counseling license on May 10, 2024.

== Arrest and conviction ==
=== Utah v. Franke/Hildebrandt ===
On August 30, 2023, Hildebrandt and Franke were arrested in Ivins, Utah, and two days later, both were charged with six counts of aggravated child abuse, a felony. According to a statement from the Santa Clara-Ivins Public Safety Department, the arrests were triggered after Franke's 12-year-old son, who appeared emaciated and had "open wounds and duct tape around the extremities", escaped through a window of Hildebrandt's house and asked at a neighboring house for food and water. Emergency services found Franke's 10-year-old daughter in the house, also malnourished; both children were taken to a hospital, where the boy was treated for severe malnourishment and "deep lacerations from being tied up with rope". A search of the house found evidence "consistent with the markings" on the 12-year-old, and the Utah Division of Child and Family Services took the boy and girl and two more of Franke's children into care. Police later reported that according to the boy, cayenne pepper and honey had been used to dress his wounds.

Franke and Hildebrandt were held without bail. Hildebrandt surrendered her license as a counselor pending resolution of the court case and a disciplinary investigation. After the arrest of Hildebrandt and Franke, YouTube banned both from the platform. After pleading guilty to four counts of aggravated child abuse, she was sentenced in 2024 to four consecutive terms of one to 15 years, the maximum for each count under Utah law. Prison sentences in Utah are indeterminate, with a minimum and maximum time frame. The offender must serve the whole sentence unless the Board of Pardons releases them sooner. However, under Utah law, consecutive sentences cannot run beyond 30 years unless the offender has a maximum life term.

Hildebrandt has been imprisoned at Utah State Correctional Facility's Dell Facility since her sentencing, along with Franke. Her first parole hearing is scheduled for December 2026.

=== Lawsuits ===
On January 22, 2025, Michael Tilleman, the husband of a former Connexions Classroom client, sued Hildebrandt and Franke in federal court for business fraud and promoting a "methodology that encouraged child abuse among their clients". Examples of the claims Tilleman made include that the two women "engaged in a racketeering enterprise by advertising and selling fraudulent services and encouraging others to perpetuate illegal and harmful acts—specifically child abuse, child torture, and psychological abuse" and that the concepts taught in the classes "ultimately led children to 'extreme danger'".

Kevin Franke later sued Hildebrandt for emotional distress and negligence.

== Depiction in media ==
Heather Locklear portrays Hildebrandt in the Lifetime film Mormon Mom Gone Wrong: The Ruby Franke Story.

Hildebrandt is also featured in the true crime television series The Curious Case Of..., which explores high-profile criminal cases and controversial figures. The episode examines her career as a self-help counselor, the allegations of abuse, and the legal proceedings that followed.

The 2025 Investigation Discovery/HBO Max documentary series Ruby & Jodi: A Cult of Sin and Influence explores the relationship between Franke and Hildebrandt. In December 2025, Netflix released a documentary, Evil Influencer: The Jodi Hildebrandt Story, about Hildebrandt and Franke.

== See also ==
- Gravelle foster child abuse cases
- DaddyOFive
