= Fantastic Adventures scandal =

2019 crime in which a mother was arrested for abusing children

Machelle Hackney Hobson
- Mug shot of Hobson in 2019
- Born: Machelle Hobson; July 17, 1971; Maricopa, Arizona, U.S.
- Died: November 12, 2019 (aged 48); Scottsdale, Arizona, U.S.
- Occupations: YouTube personality, comedian, director

YouTube information
- Channel: Fantastic Adventures
- Years active: 2012–2019
- Genre: Comedy
- Subscribers: Channel terminated (800,726 at peak)
- Views: 250 million
- Last updated: March 20, 2019

The Fantastic Adventures scandal was a 2019 scandal involving the YouTube channel Fantastic Adventures, run by Machelle Hackney Hobson of Maricopa, Arizona, in the United States. This included abuse of her 7 kids, including Jordyn and Stacy Hackney. The scandal began when one of Hobson's biological children contacted the police after witnessing her adopted siblings being systematically abused by her mother. Hobson and the channel garnered media attention, given the degree of Hobson's child abuse.

== Machelle Hobson ==
Machelle Hackney Hobson was born on July 17, 1971, in Maricopa, Arizona. While little information is present, it is known that she had two sons before marrying Marine Corps serviceman Gino Valerio, with whom he divorced, and had two daughters afterwards.

== Background ==
On June 17, 2012, Machelle Hackney Hobson created a YouTube channel, Fantastic Adventures, which would feature videos starring her seven adopted children. The channel ultimately attracted more than 800,000 subscribers, more than 350 million views, and netted at least tens of thousands of dollars in revenue.

In 2017, one of the children involved in Hobson's videos was seen running naked through the neighborhood, raising suspicion among the neighbors as to some sort of impropriety. According to the Arizona Department of Child Safety (DCS), Hobson was investigated by DCS on nine separate occasions, but no definitive evidence of abuse was found.

In March 2019, after receiving a tip from Hobson's biological adult daughter, Megan Hobson (who was at the dentist for an appointment at the time), police arrived at the Hobson home for a welfare check. On seeing the children, police noted that they appeared to be malnourished, and several of the children reported that Hobson had subjected them to physical abuse. One daughter stated that, on one occasion, Hobson had applied pepper spray to her vagina, and a son reported that Hobson had subjected him to beatings and pinched the tip of his penis with her fingernails until it bled. The children reported that Hobson would frequently abuse them when they refused to perform in "Fantastic Adventures" videos and when their performances did not meet Hobson's standards.

Hobson and her two adult biological sons, Logan and Ryan Hackney, were arrested. Hobson was charged with 30 felony counts related to the abuse, and her sons were charged with failure to report their mother's abuse. The charges of failure to report abuse against the sons were dropped in April 2019.

== Hobson's death ==
In May 2019, Hobson suffered a non-trauma-related brain injury at Pinal County Jail, and she was transferred to a local hospital. Her health subsequently deteriorated, and a judge declared her "incompetent to stand trial but restorable"—a designation that gave state officials 15 months to restore Hobson to legal competency. Hobson died in a Scottsdale hospital on November 12, 2019 and the charges against her were dismissed as a result of her death.

== Logan and Ryan Hackney ==
In May 2023, prosecutors filed charges against the two Hackney brothers for multiple counts of sexual misconduct with minors. Their indictments were sealed, and the identity of the victim (or victims) was not initially made public. Both brothers pled guilty to the charges. Logan Hackney was ultimately sentenced to 4.5 years of prison for sexual abuse in January 2025, and two months later, Ryan Hackney was sentenced to 3.5 years. Both must register as sex offenders upon their releases.

== Reactions ==
YouTube announced that it would be working with the National Center for Missing and Exploited Children to find any users who were abusing children and that anyone who was convicted would have their channel terminated.

== See also ==
- DaddyOFive
- Ruby Franke
- Turpin case
