= S v Benjamin =

South African legal case

In S v Benjamin en 'n Ander (1980), an important case in South African criminal procedure, the two appellants were brothers who had been charged with both attempted murder and robbery with aggravated circumstances.

The appellants had attempted to kill S by shooting him with a firearm and, secondly, had used violence on S and had threatened him and had led him to believe that force would be used in that they had shot him with a firearm and had threatened him with such firearm with intent to steal the money in the custody of S.

They were convicted and separate sentences on each count were imposed.

In an appeal the court held that both charges had included a conviction of an act of assault, i.e. the shooting of S with a firearm.

Accordingly, the court held that the attempted murder and robbery had resulted in the appellants being twice convicted of the same act of assault, i.e. the shooting of S with a firearm.

Thus, the court held that the convictions of attempted murder had to be set aside and that the sentences on each should be altered.
