= John Glatt =

British-American author

- Born: London, England
- Occupation: Author
- Writing career
- Genres: Biography; true crime
- Website: johnglatt.com

John Glatt is a British-American author of biographies and true crime books. Glatt was born in London and moved to New York in 1981.

== Bibliography ==
- Rage and Roll: Bill Graham and the Selling of Rock, Carol Publishing Corporation, 1993
- Lost in Hollywood: The Fast Times and Short Life of River Phoenix, St. Martin's Press, 1995
- The Chieftains: The Authorized Biography, St. Martin's Press, 1997
- For I Have Sinned, St. Martin's Press, 1998
- The Royal House of Monaco, St. Martin's Press, 1998
- Evil Twins, St. Martin's Press, 1999
- Blind Passion, St. Martin's Press, 2000 about the murder of Julia Scully by her husband George Skiadopoulos.
- Cradle of Death, St. Martin's Press, 2000 about Marie Noe
- Internet Slave Master, St. Martin's Press, 2001 about John Edward Robinson
- Cries in the Desert, St. Martin's Press, 2002 about David Parker Ray
- Twisted, St. Martin's Press, 2003 about Dr. Richard Sharpe.
- Deadly American Beauty, St. Martin's Press, 2004 about Kristin Rossum who murdered her husband.
- Depraved, St. Martin's Press, 2005 about John Edward Robinson
- One Deadly Night, St. Martin's Press, 2005 about David Camm
- Never Leave Me, St. Martin's Press, 2006 about the murder of Michelle Nyce by her husband.
- The Doctor's Wife, St. Martin's Press, 2007 about the murder of Jennifer Corbin by her husband.
- Forgive Me, Father, St. Martin's Press, 2008 about the Murder of Margaret Ann Pahl
- To Have and to Kill, St. Martin's Press, 2008 about Melanie McGuire
- Secrets in the Cellar, St. Martin's Press, 2009 about the Fritzl case
- Lost and Found, St. Martin's Press, 2010 about the kidnapping of Jaycee Dugard
- Playing with Fire, St. Martin's Press, 2010 about the murder of Jimmy Michael by his wife Shelly.
- Love Her to Death, St. Martin's Press, 2012 about Darren Mack
- The Prince of Paradise: The True Story of a Hotel Heir, His Seductive Wife, and a Ruthless Murder, St. Martin's Press, 2013 about the Murders of Bernice and Ben Novack Jr.
- The Lost Girls, St. Martin's Press, 2015 about the Ariel Castro kidnappings
- My Sweet Angel, St. Martin's Press, 2016 about the Murder of Garnett Spears
- The Family Next Door, St. Martin's Press, 2019 about the Turpin case
- The Perfect Father: The True Story of Chris Watts, His All-American Family, and a Shocking Murder, St. Martin's Press, 2020 about the Watts family murders
- Golden Boy: A Murder Among the Manhattan Elite, St. Martin's Press, 2021 about Thomas Gilbert Jr.
- The Doomsday Mother: Lori Vallow, Chad Daybell, and the End of an American Family, St. Martin's Press, 2022 about Lori Vallow and Chad Daybell
