= Evil Influencer: The Jodi Hildebrandt Story =

- Directed by: Skye Borgman
- Produced by: Skye Borgman
- Distributed by: Netflix
- Release date: December 30, 2025
- Language: English

Evil Influencer: The Jodi Hildebrandt Story is a 2025 documentary film that explores the life of Jodi Hildebrandt, a former Utah therapist whose partnership with parenting YouTuber Ruby Franke resulted in a child abuse scandal.
