= 2021 Munster abuse case =

Criminal case in Ireland in 2021

Location of Munster in Ireland

The 2021 Munster abuse case, contemporaneously reported in the media as the Munster abuse trial, refers to a criminal trial that took place in Ireland between 2021 and 2022, pertaining to five adults who were found guilty of a plethora of offenses committed against five of the children of two of the accused, between 18 August 2014 and 28 April 2016, in several different counties in the province of Munster, Ireland.

On 6 August 2021, five out of seven accused—all of whom are from Munster—were found guilty of raping, sexually abusing, sexually exploiting, abusing, and wilfully neglecting five children: four boys and one girl. In total, the five were found guilty on 77 counts, including 18 counts of rape and 24 counts of sexual assault, all of which took place between 2014 and 2016. They were sentenced to a cumulative 57 years in prison. At the time of being removed from their parents' care in 2016, the boys were aged nine, six, four, and three, and the girl was aged seven.

The parents of the children both have intellectual impairments, with the mother's deficit reported as being more severe. The condition of the house the family lived in amounted to squalor, and both of the parents, as well as the children, were repeatedly noted for being extremely dirty.

The seven who were accused are all relatives of the five children, and cannot be named due to Irish law surrounding the identification of minors involved in criminal proceedings. Extensive reporting restrictions have been enacted around the case, and as a result, the exact detail of the abuse the children suffered cannot be reported on in order to protect the welfare of the children.

== Background ==
All of the family members who were accused of the crimes are from various undisclosed locations in Munster.

=== Parents ===
The parents of the children both have undisclosed intellectual impairments, with the mother's deficit being severe enough to be classed as a disability. She further has a notably low intelligence quotient (IQ). During the trial, these factors were dismissed by the prosecution as unrelated to the abusive treatment of the children by their parents, and claimed that relating the two would be "an insult to people with intellectual disabilities to say they would leave their children in that condition." Bernard Condon, for the prosecution, accused the father of the children of neglecting his children by choice, rather than by incapacity. A social worker appointed to work with the family in 2014 said that she thought that the parents understood what they were being told at case meetings concerning the care of the children.

=== Initial engagement with social services ===
Engagement with social services began in 2011, after two of the children, the girl and one of the boys, accompanied their mother to a neonatal appointment. Medics grew concerned for the children as they were dirty, overdressed for the hot weather, and, as was later discovered, were suffering from third-degree burns. A family support worker was assigned to the family during this period, but had died by the time of the trial.

In 2014, a new social worker, who proved central to the case, moved to the area. She revealed to the trial that her previous colleagues had been concerned about the amount of "dirt, flies and nappies" in the house. At the time, there was only one case open on the family, pertaining to the eldest boy. The boy had run away from school, and after the principal of his school had followed him home, she was "so concerned at the state of the house"—which she described as "horrific"—that she immediately contacted Tusla (the organization responsible for child welfare and protection in Ireland). Several teachers had also contacted Tusla on multiple occasions, out of concern for the hygiene and well-being—both mental and physical—of the children. Members of the Garda Síochána had also contacted Tusla after finding the boy alone and soiled in a local park.

The social worker met with the boy's parents whom she described as being "filthy. Filthy dirty". She described them both as emanating a strong body odour, and that the mother's hair was matted to her head. This meeting alarmed the social worker to such an extent that she opened a professional assessment of all five of the couple's children, who at the time were aged between one and six years old. In December 2014, Tusla called a case conference, where a number of professionals such as teachers and medical practitioners assessed the needs of the children. By the end of the conference, the professionals were unanimous that the children were at risk of neglect.

In January 2016, the father of the children admitted to the social worker that he gave his children—in particular, his daughter—melatonin medication in order to make them "settle" at night. At this point, the decision was made to remove the children from the parents' care.

== Mistreatment of the children ==
The press have been banned from reporting the full nature of the "harrowing" abuse suffered by the children in this case. While it is customary not to name minors or those connected to them in criminal trials in Ireland, in the interest of protecting the children's welfare, further restrictions were applied to the reporting of the abuse they suffered, though the press have been able to report on certain aspects of the case.

The eldest boys' school principal described the house as "filthy", with "a really strong, disgusting odour coming from the house". She described the carpet as being heavily stained, with "patches of dirt and grime everywhere". She said the walls were greasy and spattered with dirt. She further described the kitchen as being in a "dreadful condition", with used crockery and pieces of food "thrown around" the room. In October 2014, a month after meeting with the parents, the social worker visited their home for the first time. The entire house was filthy, and filled with an "unbearable" stench. Before even entering the domicile, she noticed rubbish, debris, and pieces of broken toys scattered all over the garden.

After entering the house, the mother locked the front door behind them. Though the social worker protested, citing fire safety concerns, the door was locked after entry every time the social worker visited over the following 18 months. Though the floor had been swept, there remained "sticky, gunky filth" in the corners of the room. Just inside the front door, there was a "fossilized" slice of pizza on the floor. In response to suggestions that she throw the slice of pizza in the bin for fear of attracting rodents, the mother of the children responded that she needed to buy a new door in order to prevent rodents entering. There were piles of clothes all over the house, and a pot of mouldy food on the counter. Thick, smelly, hairy blankets covered almost every surface in the house, and upon pulling one back, the social worker discovered a child—18 months old at the time—tightly strapped in a buggy. The child was "pale and grey" and when spoken to was "blank and unresponsive".

In the bathroom, there was no toilet paper, shampoo, shower gels, toothpaste, or toothbrushes. There was one bar of soap in the bathroom, which was described as the "only cleaning item of any kind in the entire house". There were deep crevices in the soap, as it had dried out due to the amount of time which had passed since its last use.

=== Neighbour's diaries ===
A neighbour of the family gave evidence at the trial, in which she described the constant "screaming, roaring, and crying" coming from the children, saying that the "kids cried more than they talked in that house". The neighbour had contacted the Gardaí out of concern for the children on numerous occasions. The neighbour kept diaries, recording information on the children to provide it to authorities. The diaries detail numerous examples of the children being in dangerous situations. Once, she recorded seeing one of the boys being dangled by the waist of his trousers from an upstairs window. She said that the children were permitted to play on the road at any time of day, without any supervision. She described an incident at nighttime where there was continuous banging on the walls of the house, for up to six hours. One entry noted how on Christmas Day, the boys were playing on the road without wearing shoes, while the girl spent the day crying, as she did not get a toy she wanted. In that particular instance, all of the children were wearing their pyjamas, something which was typical, as the diaries noted that the children "lived" in their pyjamas. The neighbour recorded in her diary that the children's father would whistle at the children, after which they would line up outside the house, and he would medicate them with a syringe. The neighbour also noted that the 49-year-old uncle had more control over the household than the parents, and when he came over, there could be "dead silence" following his arrival.

=== Health issues ===
On the day of his annual school tour, the eldest boy was sent home with his father, as he was badly sunburnt. While the father insisted that the boy had refused to allow him to apply sun cream on him that morning, teachers who applied sun cream to the boy after he had been burnt said that he made no complaint about it.

Eighteen months after the children were taken into care, a pediatrician examined all five. She noted some injuries consistent with accidental injury, along with scarring from burn wounds and other unexplained scarring.

A general practitioner gave evidence at trial saying that the youngest of the children, who was 18 months old at the time of examination, was in the 0.4th percentile of weight for a child of his age.

=== Foster homes ===
Further evidence of the past mistreatment of the children emerged when they entered foster care. The children were separated when they entered the foster system, with the eldest boy going to one home, the girl and second oldest boy going to another, and the two youngest boys going to a third home. All of the children were placed in the care of experienced foster parents, several of whom later told the jury that they had never before seen neglect of the magnitude present in this case. Upon arriving at their foster homes, the children had faeces caked to their bodies. According to the foster parents, the older children were unable to use cutlery, a toothbrush, or toilet roll, and did not know how to shower or bathe. The eldest boy and the second youngest boy were described as having almost no teeth. All had dirty skin, hair, and nails, and those who were not missing teeth had dental issues. Upon entering foster care, the children arrived with just the clothes on their back. For the three eldest children, this amounted to dirty school uniforms.

The eldest boy was reportedly fascinated by the amount of food in his foster parents' house. His foster mother took him to a shopping centre to purchase new clothes, where they ran into two of his younger siblings. The boy expressed that he hoped his younger siblings would also have clothes bought for them.

The girl and the second oldest boy were sent to the same foster home. Their foster mother reported that the boy was badly scarred, and that the girl had next to no hair. According to their foster mother, the siblings had a "disturbing" relationship with food: they would never go looking for snacks or take food from the fridge, always awaited permission before eating food she set in front of them, and initially she had to chop their food in advance, as they were unable to properly chew it.

The second youngest boy was briefly in a foster home without any of his siblings, though he was later moved into the same house as the youngest sibling. His initial foster mother described how when he cried he would do so in total silence, making no noise as tears streamed down his face. The boy would not speak for the first few days in his foster home, and would not allow his foster parents to bathe him for the first three days.

The foster mother of the youngest child stated that she had never seen a child so afraid of being washed, that the child was unresponsive when hugged, and that the boy would not call out during the night, even in cases where he had vomited on himself. She later took in the second youngest boy as well.

After entering foster care, several of the foster parents became concerned about the sexual behaviour being exhibited, and obscene language being used by the children. Gardaí visited the elder three children, which is when they first made allegations of abuse.

== Trial ==
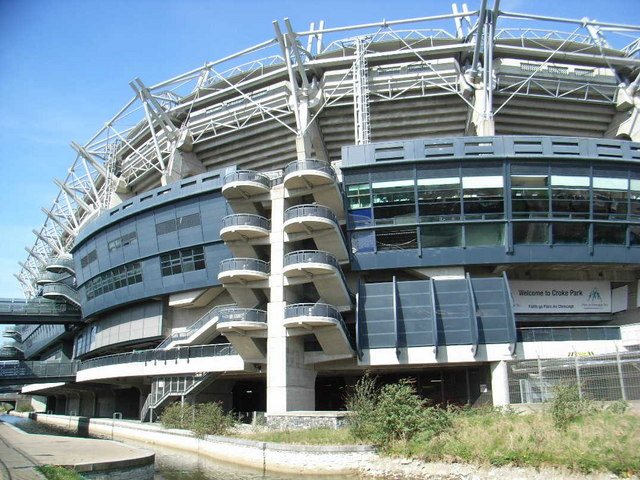
Croke Park, Dublin, where the trial was held

The primary portion of the trial lasted 10 weeks, and was heard at the level of the Central Criminal Court. Due to social distancing measures in place as a result of the COVID-19 pandemic in Ireland, the trial was held in a conference room in Croke Park. Each of the accused had their own defense counsel, and all were relatives of the five children. An enlarged jury of 15 were sworn in for the trial on 27 May 2021 by the presiding judge, Mr Justice Paul McDermott. They went out on 29 July, returning on 6 August after almost 19 hours of deliberations, returning 41 of the 78 charges, 40 of which were guilty. After asking the judge for guidance on the definition of wilful neglect, the jury returned to their deliberations, and after just over an hour returned the final 37 verdicts, all of which were guilty.

=== Children's testimony ===
During the trial, the three eldest children gave evidence via videolink. The content of the interviews of the girl and younger boy have been excluded from most reports of the trial, which discuss only the behaviour of the children during the interview process, the manner in which they were dealt with by the courts, and the fact that they claimed to have been abused, sexually abused, and exploited. Their evidence was given via recordings; the day after their respective evidence was heard, they were cross-examined. The Limerick Leader reported that the younger boy said in a Garda interview that his father and mother had touched his genitals with their hands, and that his mother also touched them with a stick. He further described feeling "bad" and "uncomfortable" after his maternal aunt touched his genitals with her hand, and her husband, the older uncle, touched them with a spoon. He said that he had been anally raped by his father, and both of his uncles. He said that his two older siblings had asked him if he wanted to "do sex" with them. He went on to say that photographs were taken of him when he was naked and "doing sex", and that those photos had been posted on Facebook.

The eldest child delivered his evidence live. He delivered similar testimony to his siblings, stating that they had been abused, while also detailing how prior to being taken into foster care, the children lacked access to clean clothes, were not provided with enough to eat, and were not "cleaned right". Though he admitted that his memory of the events was now hazy, he repeatedly denied accusations from the defence that he was misremembering, or that he was making up his testimony.

=== Garda interviews with the accused ===
During interviews with Gardaí, the mother of the children confessed to some of the accusations relating to the sexual abuse of the children, which she later recanted. She recounted several instances of abuse, including one which incriminated her husband and the children's 49-year-old uncle. She described the abuse as having happened "maybe once or twice a week". Having initially denied the allegations, part way through her fifth interview she began to tell Gardaí that she had witnessed her own mother, the children's grandmother, sexually assaulting the girl. She further described how she herself had abused the three eldest children. She further provided the Gardaí with a list of names of people who had abused the children. During the trial, she did not stand by these admissions.

The mother's sister, who was later found guilty of sexually assaulting the girl, likewise initially denied the allegations, before later saying that what the children were reporting was correct. After conferring with her solicitor, however, she said that she had been lying, and that she had neither done anything to the children nor witnessed anything untoward happening to them in her home. She is considered a minor party to the crimes.

In the absence of the jury, the court was told that the grandmother of the children confessed to Gardaí about having sexually assaulted her granddaughter, saying "I only did it the once [...] I think you know, there's no point in lying." These interviews with Gardaí, however, were considered inadmissible as evidence for several reasons. At one stage the woman asked for a solicitor, and was not provided with one. She had an intellectual disability, and appeared not to understand some of the words the Gardaí were saying. The presiding judge further found that "verbal aggression and foul language" were used by Garda interviewers. Due to these mitigating factors, her interviews were not played for the jury, and her charges were eventually withdrawn.

=== Role of the uncles ===
The children's 49-year-old uncle, who is married to their maternal aunt, was found to have played a central role in the abuse of the children. According to Bernard Condon, for the prosecution, he was a "recurring feature [...] in all of the children's allegations". Mr Condon alleged that the uncle played a particular role in the abuse of the eldest boy, whom he instructed not to tell anyone about the abuse. According to Mr Condon, this uncle did nothing to stop the abuse "because he was right in the middle of doing it". The uncle had a high level of control over the family.

The younger uncle of the children was the only member of the accused to take the stand. Like the other members of the accused, he denied all wrongdoing. Having only been mentioned in the children's second Garda interviews, Mr Condon urged the jury not to treat him as an "afterthought" in this case, as the young girl in particular had described "in great detail" what this uncle had done to her.

=== Charges ===
All of the accused denied all of the charges they were accused of.

The father of the five children, aged 56, was charged with 34 different counts, including rape, anal rape, sexual assault, sexual exploitation and permitting other people to engage in sexual activity with a child, wilful neglect, and mistreating his children by medicating them. He was found guilty of 31 counts: six counts of rape, six counts of sexual assault, three counts of permitting other people to engage in sexual activity with a child, three counts of sexually exploiting two of them, 10 counts of wilfully neglecting five of his children, and three counts of mistreating three of his children by giving them medication. An additional three counts against him were withdrawn during the trial by direction of the judge.

The mother of the children, aged 34, was charged with 25 counts, including sexual assault, sexual exploitation, permitting other people to engage in sexual activity with a child and wilful neglect. She was found guilty of all 25 counts: 10 counts of willful neglect, 10 counts of sexual assault, three counts of permitting other people to engage in sexual activity with a child, and two counts of sexually exploiting her oldest son.

The aunt of the children, aged 35, was charged with 3 counts of sexual assault. She was found guilty of all counts: two counts of sexually assaulting the girl and one count of sexually assaulting the second oldest boy. Her husband, aged 49, was charged with 12 counts including rape, sexual assault and sexual exploitation. He was found guilty of 10 counts: five counts of sexual assault, three counts of sexual exploitation and two counts of rape. Two additional counts were withdrawn during the trial.

The uncle of the children, aged 27, was charged with 10 counts including rape, sexual assault and sexual exploitation. He was found guilty of 8 charges: six counts of rape and two counts of sexual exploitation. He was found not guilty of one count of sexually exploiting the girl. One count was withdrawn during the trial by direction of the judge. His partner, aged 32, was charged with four counts including sexual assault and sexual exploitation. All charges against her were withdrawn.

The grandmother of the children, aged 57, was charged with three counts of sexually assaulting her granddaughter. All charges against her were withdrawn.

All of the alleged offences took place between 18 August 2014 and 28 April 2016. Out of 91 total charges leveled against the group of seven, 13 were withdrawn. Of the five who were found guilty, 78 charges in total had been leveled against them, and they were found guilty of all but one charge.

=== Juror's letter ===
On 4 October 2021, it emerged that after the trial concluded in August one of the jurors wrote a letter to the judge. Though the contents of the letter cannot be published by the media due to the reporting restrictions enacted surrounding this case, it is understood that the letter detailed the juror's "views of the jury system". Mr Justice McDermott made the letter available to all of the barristers involved in the case on 4 October 2021, and though he felt that the contents of the letter would not prevent him from sentencing those found guilty, he gave the defence counsel leave to return to court to raise any potential concerns they may have arising from the letter. On 17 December, defence counsel for both the 27-year-old uncle and the 49-year-old-uncle moved to have the guilty verdicts set aside in wake of the contents of the letter. Conor Devally, senior counsel representing the 27-year-old uncle, expressed the possibility that a number of the verdicts may be "unfair or tainted". He further referred to cases heard before the European Court of Human Rights, in which verdicts given under similar circumstances have been set aside. He submitted that in this area, Irish law is outdated. Andrew Sexton, senior counsel for the 49-year-old uncle, supported Devally's motion. Senior counsel for the children's father submitted that while the letter had caused his client "disquiet and concern", and that they would support an inquiry into the situation surrounding the letter, they also submitted that such action would have to take place in a different forum. This was supported by respective counsel for both the children's mother and their aunt. Bernard Condon stated that it was the Director of Public Prosecutions'(DPP) view that the trial judge had no jurisdiction to set aside verdicts in the case, nor any authority to contact and question jurors— that any objections would have to be heard before the Court of Appeal. On 21 December, Mr Justice McDermott stated that he was satisfied the letter from the juror did not contain evidence which would suggest that impropriety had taken place and could not be used by him, as trial judge, as a basis for any inquiry, agreeing with the DPP that it was the business of the Court of Appeal.

=== Sentencing ===
The court reconvened on 4 October 2021, and set a date for sentencing on 10 January 2022. All of those found guilty were remanded in custody from 6 August 2021 and remained in custody until they again appeared before the courts for sentencing. Some of them had packed their belongings in advance of the guilty verdict.

==== Victim impact statements ====
Victim impact statements were made by each set of foster parents on behalf of the children, as well as by the eldest three children in the family. The boy, who was not present in the court, stated in a written statement that what his family had done to him had "changed [his] whole life", and that he thought that "[his] old family should go to jail for a long time for what they put [him] and [his] brothers and sister through." He further stated that he didn't believe his family should ever be permitted to be near children again. His siblings' statements, also written, were both two sentences long: the girl saying that her parents had "ruined [her] childhood and didn't even care about [her]. I wasn't loved when I was younger." The younger boy said that he didn't "feel safe about them not being in prison. I had no happy childhood."

The impact of the abuse on the development and welfare of the children was further revealed by the victim impact statements issued by their foster parents. The foster mother of the eldest boy revealed in her statement that the boy "couldn't believe" that his bedroom was clean, and that the bed-sheets were changed regularly. She described him as being so thin upon arrival that "you could nearly see through his skin". She soon brought the boy to see a doctor and barber—the boy, nine years old at the time, had never been to a barber before. The boy reportedly couldn't understand that the kitchen was so full of food, and would "proudly show off the contents of the fridge" to any visitors to the house. She described what the children had endured as "unthinkable" and "inexcusable".

The foster parents of the girl and second eldest boy gave details about the amount of support the children needed after entering foster care: they were brought to a speech and language therapist, a physiotherapist, an occupational therapist, a dietitian, an eye specialist, a dentist and orthodontist, a psychotherapist, a play therapist, and a specialist that helps children learn how to build attachments with others. A burns specialist plastic surgeon was also required, to treat burns sustained in 2011—the children entered foster care in 2016. The foster parents stated that it seemed as though the kids had never been toilet trained, and that they had massive issues with food—seemingly, the children could not identify when they were hungry, or control the amount that they ate. The pair would hide food around the house, and would even steal food from the lunchboxes of other children at their school. The parents theorized that hunger was so prevalent in their lives that they were unable to properly recognise their hunger need. For the first few weeks of their time in foster care, the children often tried to hide in various locations, such as under the stairs, beneath tables, and in the hot press. The children were not accustomed to wearing clean clothes every day. The children were afraid of falling asleep, and as result, every light in the house was kept on during the night. The children were also deeply uncomfortable with physical contact or proximity to other people for their first two years in foster care. Their foster parents were quoted as saying "We don't think they knew what their needs were and they certainly didn't know what feelings were."

The foster parents of the youngest two boys, who initially only had the youngest boy, said that when the youngest boy entered foster care, at the age of three, the boy would sit extremely still, and would seemingly be scanning the facial expressions of the adults around him. He walked around the house on the tips of his toes, and would peek around corners before moving beyond them. When the second youngest entered their care, he was unable to relax for a long time. He would pretend to sleep when put to bed, and was focused on telling adults whatever he thought they wanted to hear. Like the other children, an extensive range of specialists were secured for the boys, including doctors, therapists, play therapists, paediatricians and dietitians.

==== Sentences delivered ====
The sentences were delivered on 18 January 2022. When delivering the sentences, Mr Justice McDermott stated that children's parents had made "the most profound breach of trust a human being can commit against their children". The five who were found guilty were sentenced to a cumulative 57 years in prison: the father and both uncles were sentenced to 15 years each, the mother to nine years, and the aunt to three years. The sentences were backdated to 6 August 2021, when the five first entered into custody.

== Aftermath ==
=== Second trial ===
A second trial, concerning the abuse of another child who was related to the five siblings, terminated in March 2022 when all charges against the accused were dropped.

=== Victims ===
After their five children had been taken into care, their mother had a sixth child: the couple's second daughter. The pregnancy had been kept a secret, with the mother not receiving any medical care until six weeks before the baby was born. The 49-year-old uncle assisted in the baby's delivery. The father reportedly could not remember the name of this daughter. She was also put into foster care.

The children, having entered foster care in 2016, are now reportedly doing well, with only hazy memories of their life in their original home. The eldest three children found the trial, "difficult and traumatising", according to their foster parents. Since the end of the trial, the eldest boy is reportedly much happier, and is described as a polite boy whose teachers often praise him. During the trial, the girl and second eldest boy suffered the reemergence of sleeping and eating issues. Described as "kind, caring children" by their foster mother, they reportedly feel "much safer" since the conclusion of the trial. They reportedly struggle, however, to understand why they were abused in the manner that they were, and "are often very sad". Both have social anxiety, and are averse to change. Of the two youngest boys, their foster parents said that they "want to say that these children have a lot of potential, but because of their early life experiences, we worry as to what the future holds for them."

In 2018, a review of the actions taken by Tusla and An Garda Síochána in respect to this case was proposed by Katherine Zappone, then the Minister for Children. Though it underwent several months of preparation, the review was eventually cancelled due to concerns from the Attorney General that it might jeopardize the trial.

=== Appeal ===
The father, mother, and 49-year-old uncle had their sentences raised on 30 July 2024 following an appeal where the Irish Court of Appeal determined their original sentences were too lenient; the father was given a life sentence, while the mother and uncle's sentences were raised three years each. The father's counsel filed an appeal of this decision to the Supreme Court of Ireland, but the court declined to hear the case, effectively cementing his sentence.

== See also ==
- Turpin case
