= Digital kidnapping =

Impersonating a minor or their parents online

Digital kidnapping is the theft of a minor's photos, posing as them, or posing as their parents. DK is commonly done to reveal private or sensitive information that negatively impacts the child's life, making it difficult to gain acceptance to college, or subjecting them to bullying. In rare cases, a kidnapper may assume the identity of a parent, making the impostor's followers believe that they are the child's parent. By posing as a peer or authority figure, adults may also gather information about minors, and use it in real world crimes, such as kidnapping.

== Punishment ==
In the United States, the act of reposting photos is legal, and does not lead to punishment. However the misappropriation of name or likeness is illegal, or can result in a lawsuit. In addition to this, it is illegal to publish private facts, such as addresses and birthdates, under the Publication of Private Facts law.

== See also ==
- Sharenting
- Identity Theft
- Social Media
- Kidnapping
