= John Edward Robinson =

American serial killer on death row

- 1985 mug shot taken by the Johnson County Sheriff's Department
- Born: John Edward Robinson; December 27, 1943 (age 82); Cicero, Illinois, U.S.
- Convictions: Kansas; Capital murder (2 counts); Aggravated kidnapping Missouri; First degree murder (5 counts)
- Penalty: Kansas; Death; Missouri; Life imprisonment without parole

Details
- Victims: 8+
- Span of crimes: 1984–2000
- Country: United States
- States: Kansas; Missouri
- Date apprehended: June 2, 2000
- Imprisoned at: El Dorado Correctional Facility

John Edward Robinson (born December 27, 1943) is an American convicted serial killer, kidnapper, rapist, and forger. He was found guilty and received the death penalty in 2003 for three murders committed in Kansas. Two years later, as part of a plea deal, he admitted responsibility in five other murders committed in Missouri, for which he received multiple life sentences without possibility of parole. Robinson, a prolific con man and embezzler, used online chatrooms to make contact with some of his victims while under the alias "Slavemaster" – this makes him the first known serial killer to have used the Internet to lure in victims.

== Early life and criminal history ==
John Edward Robinson was born on December 27, 1943, in Cicero, Illinois, the third of five children to Henry and Alberta Robinson, an abusive alcoholic father and a strict disciplinarian mother. In 1957, Robinson became an Eagle Scout and travelled to London with a group of Scouts who performed before Queen Elizabeth II; afterwards backstage he received a kiss from actress and singer Judy Garland.

Robinson enrolled at Quigley Preparatory Seminary, a minor seminary in Chicago, but dropped out after one year due to disciplinary issues. School records showed that he was a poor and failing student and frequently got involved in fights with his classmates and spent much time in school detention. In 1961, Robinson enrolled at Morton Junior College in Cicero to become a medical radiographer, but dropped out after two years. In 1964, he moved to Kansas City and married Nancy Jo Lynch, who gave birth to their first child, John Jr., in 1965, followed by daughter Kimberly in 1967, and twins Christopher and Christine in 1971.

In 1969, Robinson was arrested in Kansas City for embezzling $33,000 from the medical practice of Dr. Wallace Graham, where he worked as a radiographer using forged credentials. He was sentenced to three years of probation. The following year, he violated his probation by moving to Chicago without his probation officer's permission and gained a job as an insurance salesman at the R.B. Jones Company. In 1971, he was arrested for embezzling funds and was ordered back to Kansas City, where his probation was extended. In 1975, Robinson's probation was extended again after an arrest on charges of securities fraud and mail fraud in connection with a phony medical consulting company he had formed.

Robinson became a Scoutmaster, a baseball coach, and a Sunday school teacher. In 1977, he was named to the board of directors of a local charitable organization where he forged letters from its executive director to the mayor of Kansas City and from the mayor to civic leaders, naming him as the organization's Man of the Year. Under that guise, he hosted an awards luncheon in his honor. After completing his probation in 1979, Robinson was arrested for embezzlement and check forgery, for which he served sixty days in jail in 1982. After his release, he formed a bogus hydroponics business and stole $25,000 from a friend to whom he promised a fast investment return so the friend could pay for his dying wife's medical care.

== Murders ==
Robinson is known to be responsible for eight homicides, but his total victim tally remains unknown. Kansas and Missouri police note that long stretches of Robinson's time remain unaccounted for, and considering how some of Robinson's confirmed victims have never been found or were not reported missing, authorities fear that there are additional undiscovered victims. "He's maintained the secrets about what he's done with the women. He won't ever tell. It's the last control he's got," said one investigator. "There are probably other barrels waiting to be opened, other bodies waiting to be found."

In 1984, having established two more fraudulent shell companies, Robinson hired Paula Guylene Godfrey, aged 19, ostensibly to work as a sales representative for Robinson's management consulting firm, Equi II. Godfrey was interested in pursuing a business career and told her family that Robinson had arranged for her and a group of women to fly to San Antonio, Texas to enroll in a clerical skills course. Robinson picked Godfrey up at her residence in Overland Park, Kansas on September 1, 1984, to drive her to the airport for her flight. After hearing nothing further from her, Godfrey's parents filed a missing persons report. Police questioned Robinson, who denied any knowledge of her whereabouts. Several days later, her parents received a typewritten letter, with Godfrey's signature at the bottom, thanking Robinson for his help and asserting that she was "OK" and did not want to see her family. The investigation was terminated as Godfrey was of legal age, and there was no evidence of wrongdoing. No trace of Godfrey has ever been found.

In 1985, using the alias John Osborne, Robinson met 19-year-old Lisa Stasi and her four-month-old daughter, Tiffany Stasi, at Hope House, a shelter for homeless women in Kansas City. Stasi told relatives that she was joining the Kansas City Outreach Program, an organization designed to assist young mothers. Robinson presented the program to Lisa as a way to receive free room and board while studying for her GED. He promised Stasi a job and a stable living situation in Chicago in exchange for signing several sheets of blank stationery. Lisa and Tiffany checked into Room 131 at the Rodeway Inn in Overland Park in early January 1985. Lisa told her relatives that "Mr. Osborne" arranged and paid for their new accommodations. On January 10, Robinson arrived at Lisa's sister-in-law's house where Lisa and Tiffany entered his vehicle and purportedly returned to the motel. A few days later, Robinson contacted his brother and sister-in-law who had been unable to adopt a baby through traditional channels, informing them that he knew of a baby whose mother had killed herself. For $5,500 in "legal fees", the couple received Tiffany, whose identity was confirmed in 2000 by DNA testing and a set of seemingly authentic adoption papers with the forged signatures of two lawyers and a judge.

In January 1987, 27-year-old Catherine Frances Clampitt left her child with her parents in Wichita Falls, Texas, and moved to Kansas City to live with her brother's family and find employment. She saw an advertisement for Equi II, a management consulting firm in Overland Park, Kansas, shortly after her arrival which promised extensive travel and a new wardrobe. Robinson hired her and Clampitt began staying at several local hotels near the Equi II offices. On June 15, 1987, Clampitt left to have a meeting with Robinson. She has not been seen since. Her missing persons case remains open.

Between 1987 and 1993, Robinson was incarcerated, first in Kansas on multiple fraud convictions and later in Missouri for another fraud conviction and parole violations. At the Western Missouri Correctional Facility, he met 49-year-old Beverly Bonner, the prison librarian. Upon his release in January 1994, Bonner left her husband, a prison doctor, and moved to Kansas to work for him. After Robinson arranged for Bonner's alimony checks to be forwarded to a Kansas post office box, her family never heard from her again. For several years, Bonner's mother had been forwarding her alimony checks and Robinson continued cashing them.

After his release, Robinson discovered the Internet and roamed online chatrooms using the name Slavemaster, looking for women who enjoyed playing the submissive partner role during sex. An early online correspondent was Sheila Faith, 45, whose 15-year-old daughter Debbie Faith was a wheelchair user due to spina bifida. Robinson, portraying himself as a wealthy businessman and philanthropist, offered to pay Debbie's medical expenses and give Sheila a job. In 1994, the mother and daughter moved from Fullerton, California to Kansas City and immediately disappeared. Robinson cashed Faith's pension checks for the next seven years.

Robinson became well known in increasingly popular BDSM chatrooms. In 1999, he offered a job and a bondage relationship to Izabela Lewicka, a 21-year-old Polish immigrant living in Indiana. When she moved to Kansas City, Robinson gave her an engagement ring, despite still being married, and brought her to the county registrar, where they paid for a marriage license that was never picked up. It is unclear whether Lewicka believed she and Robinson were married; she told her parents that she had married, but never told them her husband's name. She did sign a 115-item slave contract that gave Robinson almost total control over every aspect of her life, including her bank accounts. In 1999, Lewicka disappeared. Robinson told a web designer he employed that she had been caught smoking marijuana and deported. Her body was found in a drum on Robinson's farm in Kansas in 2000.

In March 2000, a 27-year-old licensed practical nurse named Suzette Trouten moved from Michigan to Kansas to travel with Robinson as his submissive sex slave. Trouten's mother received several typed letters signed by her daughter and purportedly mailed while the couple was abroad, although the envelopes all bore Kansas City postmarks. The letters were, her mother said, uncharacteristically free of typographical errors. Later, Robinson told Trouten's mother that she had run off with an acquaintance after stealing money from him. Along with Lewicka, her body was found in a drum on Robinson's farm in Kansas in the same year.

== Arrest, trial and conviction ==
Over time, Robinson became increasingly careless, and his ability to avoid detection declined. By 1999, he had attracted the attention of authorities in Kansas and Missouri as his name frequently came up in missing person investigations. He was arrested in June 2000 at his farm near La Cygne, Kansas, after a woman filed a sexual battery complaint against him and another charged him with stealing her sex toys. The theft charge finally gave investigators the probable cause they needed to obtain search warrants.

On the farm, a task force found the decaying bodies of two women, later identified as Lewicka and Trouten, in two 85-pound (39 kg) chemical drums. Across the state line in Missouri, investigators searched a storage facility where Robinson rented two garages. They found three similar chemical drums containing corpses subsequently identified as Bonner, Faith, and Faith's daughter. All five women were killed in the same way, by one or more blows to the head with a blunt instrument.

In 2002, Robinson stood trial in Kansas for the murders of Trouten, Lewicka, and Stasi along with multiple lesser charges. After the longest criminal trial in Kansas history, he was convicted on all counts. Robinson received 2 death sentences for the murders of Trouten and Lewicka, and life imprisonment for Stasi's murder because she was killed before Kansas reinstated the death penalty. He received a 5-to-20-year prison sentence for interfering with the parental custody of Stasi's baby, 20 years for kidnapping Trouten, and seven months for theft.

After his Kansas convictions, Robinson faced murder charges in Missouri based on the evidence discovered in that state. Missouri aggressively pursued capital punishment convictions, so Robinson's attorneys wanted to avoid a trial there. Chris Koster, the Missouri prosecutor, insisted as a condition of any plea bargain that Robinson lead authorities to the bodies of Stasi, Godfrey, and Clampitt. Robinson, who has never cooperated with investigators, refused. However, Koster faced pressure to make a deal because his case was not technically airtight. Among other issues, there was no unequivocal evidence that any of the murders had been committed within his jurisdiction. Robinson, on the other hand, faced pressure to plead guilty to avoid an almost certain death sentence in Missouri, and failing that, yet another capital murder trial back in Kansas.

When it became clear that the women's remains would never be found without Robinson's cooperation, a compromise was reached. In a carefully scripted plea in October 2003, Robinson acknowledged that Koster had enough evidence to convict him of capital murder for the deaths of Godfrey, Clampitt, Bonner, and the Faiths. Though his statement was technically a guilty plea and was accepted as such by the Missouri court, observers remarked that it was notably devoid of any remorse or specific acceptance of responsibility. Robinson received a life sentence without possibility of parole for each of the five murders.

In November 2015, the Kansas Supreme Court vacated the Trouten and Stasi murder convictions on technicalities but upheld the Lewicka conviction and its accompanying death sentence. The ruling marked the first time Kansas's highest court has upheld a death sentence since the reinstatement of capital punishment there in 1994. Robinson currently remains on death row at the El Dorado Correctional Facility in Kansas.

Robinson launched another appeal against his remaining death sentences in September 2026, with his lawyers arguing that his Eighth Amendment rights as well as the state rights were violated in the 2003 trial. Robinson's legal team asked for capital punishment to be vacated and replaced by life sentences.

== Aftermath ==
In 2005, Nancy Robinson filed for divorce after forty-one years of marriage, citing incompatibility and irreconcilable differences. The following year, Stasi's daughter—known since her faked adoption as Heather Robinson—filed a civil suit against Truman Medical Center in Kansas City and social worker Karen Gaddis. The suit accused Gaddis of putting Robinson in contact with Stasi and her newborn daughter in 1984 after he told Gaddis that he ran a charitable organization assisting "unwed mothers of white babies."

In 2007, Heather and the hospital reached a settlement for an undisclosed sum, which Heather said she would split with her biological grandmother, Patricia Sylvester. Heather won a second judgment in 2007 preventing Robinson from profiting from any future potential book sales or film rights. In 2006, the body of a young woman was found in a barrel in an area of rural Iowa where Robinson reportedly had a business partner. She was initially considered a possible victim but was later identified and ruled out.

== In media ==
- A 2001 book by John Glatt, Internet Slave Master (ISBN 0312979274), documented Robinson's life up to the time of his Kansas trial. A second book by Glatt, Depraved (ISBN 0312936842), published in 2005, focused on the lives of Robinson's victims and others affected by his crimes.
- Anyone You Want Me to Be: A True Story of Sex and Death on the Internet (ISBN 1439189471) by John Douglas and Stephen Singular was published in 2003.
- Sue Wiltz' book Slave Master was published in 2004.
- Robinson's criminal activities were also profiled on episodes of the A&E series Cold Case Files, Investigation Discovery's FBI: Criminal Pursuit, Very Scary People, Sins & Secrets, Vanity Fair Confidential, It Takes a Killer, and Deadly Doctors, as well as Forensic Files, and The New Detectives on the Discovery Channel.

=== Adaptation ===
In 2025, Lifetime aired a television film adaption about John Edward Robinson and his connection with Tiffany Stasi/Heather Robinson called Kidnapped by a Killer: The Heather Robinson Story. The television film starred Steve Guttenberg as John Edward Robinson, Jana Kramer as parole officer Lena Coy, and Rachel Stubington as Tiffany Stasi/Heather Robinson.

== See also ==
- John Haigh

General:

- List of serial killers in the United States
- List of death row inmates in the United States § Kansas
