= DaddyOFive =

YouTube channel, 2015–2018, 2021–2025

Mike Martin
- Born: Michael Christopher Martin; December 17, 1982 (age 43); Baltimore, Maryland, U.S.
- Occupations: YouTube personality, vlogger
- Years active: 2011–present
- Children: 6

YouTube information
- Channel: DaddyOFive
- Genres: Vlog, prank
- Subscribers: Channel terminated (713,000 at peak)
- Views: 176 million+
- Criminal information
- Status: Released
- Conviction: Child neglect (2 counts)
- Penalty: 5 years probation

Details
- Victims: 2
- Date apprehended: August 11, 2017

DaddyOFive, briefly known as FamilyOFive, was a short-lived YouTube channel and online alias of Michael Christopher "Mike" Martin (born December 17, 1982) which focused on daily vlogging and "prank" videos. At its peak, the channel's videos featured Martin, his first wife Rose Martin, and his second wife Heather Martin—also known by her online alias MommyOFive—and their children. In 2016–2017, following a series of "prank" videos showing the parents physically and emotionally abusing their children, the channel became the center of a public controversy. They later were found guilty of child abuse and have ceased creating videos on that channel but have resurfaced on others, following the termination of their original channel.

== History ==
=== Creation of channel and rise in popularity ===
The channel was created on August 13, 2015; the channel's about page stated, "we as a FAMILY DECIDED to make this YouTube channel just for fun." The channel focused on Mike, Heather and their five children, whose names are Jake, Ryan, Emma, Cody, and Alex. Mike and Heather Martin have since had a child together since the channel's termination. Jake, Ryan and Alex are Heather's children from a previous marriage. Cody and Emma are Mike and his ex-girlfriend Rose Hall's children.

The channel accumulated around 750,000 subscribers and 176 million views, prior to Mike removing the videos from public viewing. The Guardian and New York magazine reported the videos had been made private, while Time and The Washington Post reported that the videos had been deleted.

=== Controversy and public response ===
The family became the center of abuse claims following these prank videos which became gradually more extreme, with many videos involving Mike encouraging his eldest child, Jake, to physically and psychologically abuse his younger siblings, often to the point of severe injury and intense emotional distress.

One such video involved Cody, the second youngest child, being thrown through a doorway by Jake and against a bookcase by Mike; he was left with what appeared to be injuries to his face. Another video involved Alex, the youngest, being instructed by Mike to slap Emma, the middle child, across the face for failing to perform a water bottle flip correctly; he was never reprimanded, despite leaving Emma visibly hurt and crying.

American YouTube personality and news commentator Philip DeFranco released a series of videos covering the channel and sharing his distaste for the content they created, starting with "WOW... We Need To Talk About This..." on April 17, 2017. He primarily focused on a video involving invisible ink being spilled, with Cody and Alex being falsely accused of making the mess. In the video, Cody cries and pleads hysterically after being screamed and sworn at and accused of lying, with Alex also facing a similar treatment from Mike and Heather.

DeFranco's first video covering the channel was credited by many news outlets for shining a light on the channel's extreme content. Andrew Griffin of The Independent wrote, "[DeFranco's] video was viewed more than three million times and brought widespread condemnation of the DaddyOFive channel." The video has led to debates about sharenting and children being minor celebrities on social media.

Emma and Cody were removed from their custody and returned to their biological mother, Rose Hall, who said that she had not seen them since July 2014, when she was duped into signing court papers.

The creators also issued a public apology for the videos and said they were "a loving, close-knit family."

=== Post-controversy status and plea agreement ===
Mike's channel DaddyOFive released a video on July 7, 2017, showing text expressing that it is not a dead channel and asking viewers to subscribe to Heather's MommyOFive channel for new videos and updates. In July 2017, Mike's channel and Heather's channel had both around 730,000 subscribers and 4.7 million video views, and around 110,000 subscribers and 2.1 million video views, respectively. Later, they changed their channel name to FamilyOFive after receiving the YouTube Creator Award's Silver Play Button for Heather.

Prosecutors from the Frederick County Circuit Court filed criminal charges against Mike and Heather in August 2017, with them facing two counts of "neglect of a minor" apart. On September 11, 2017, Mike and Heather pleaded guilty by way of an Alford plea and were sentenced to five years of supervised probation.

=== Second termination ===
The FamilyOFive channel, a new outlet for Mike and Heather's videos created while they were on probation, re-instituted the objectionable pattern of behavior regarding abuse of Jake, Ryan, Emma, Cody and Alex featured in the videos. The channel was subsequently terminated on July 18, 2018, for violating YouTube's Community Guidelines, according to several news sources, and YouTube now requires videos featuring children to comply with local child labor laws.

=== Attempted comeback ===
Despite their second attempt at publishing content on YouTube being met with termination, Mike and Heather continued to post videos on their official website behind a monthly $5 subscription fee, and continued streaming gaming videos on their Twitch channel. As of January 2019, Mike and Heather have deleted all of the videos on their website, stating "In order to move on with the healing process from the 2017 events, we have AGREED WILLINGLY to remove our videos, from even this site. For the sake and well-being of our family Mike and I feel it is best that we take a long break from the public spotlight."

On November 11, 2018, Jake, Ryan and Alex created a new YouTube channel called "The Martin Boys" later changed to "The Martin Family". On January 8, 2019, Mike was accused of uploading a video in August 2018, which featured Cody. Despite breaking a major probation rule, Mike and Heather's supervised probation was reduced to probation before judgment. As of 2025, Mike was active on YouTube as The Martin Family, but the channel has since been "terminated for a violation of YouTube's Terms of Service."

== See also ==
- Fantastic Adventures scandal
- Ruby Franke
- Turpin case
