= Jordan Turpin =

American social media personality (born 2000)

- Born: Jordan Elizabeth Turpin; November 16, 2000 (age 25); Rio Vista, Texas, U.S.
- Occupations: Social media influencer; model; entrepreneur
- Years active: 2021–present

TikTok information
- Page: jordan_turpin
- Followers: 1.7 M
- Last updated: February 5, 2026

Jordan Elizabeth Turpin (born November 16, 2000) is an American social media personality. She gained national exposure on January 14, 2018, at the age of 17, in the Turpin case, when she escaped from her abusive parents' home in Perris, California. She alerted local police, who discovered disturbing conditions in her home, where she lived in virtual captivity with her parents and 12 siblings, ranging from 2 to 29 years old (with seven being adults on January 14, 2018).

== Online career ==
Following her first public appearance in 2021 on 20/20 with her oldest sister, Jennifer, Turpin has since gained a prominent fanbase in social media, particularly on TikTok, where she posts lip-sync, motivational and dance videos and has gained more than one million followers.

In February 2023, Turpin was coined "The Most Unlikely Influencer" by Elle.

== Other ventures ==
In late 2022, Turpin started to pursue modeling with an unknown agency. In November 2023, on her 23rd birthday, she launched "Braveness by Jordan Turpin", a merchandise line. In the same month, Turpin revealed in an interview with People that she planned to pursue bigger projects surrounding mental health in 2024, along with the hope of developing an acting career. In April 2024, her sister Jennifer Turpin published the book Where Was God?, recounting her experiences in her parents' household while maintaining her faith in God despite the trauma.
