= Ruby & Jodi: A Cult of Sin and Influence =

2025 American TV documentary series

- Directed by: Olivia Crist Grant
- Music by: Paul Dutton; Thomas Dutton
- Country of origin: United States
- Original language: English
- No. of episodes: 4

Production
- Executive producers: Olivia Crist Grant; Steven Michaels; Jodi Flynn; Ariel Brozell; Rachel Bozich; Lauren Andrade; Jennifer O'Connell; Andi Walker Ochoa; Rebecca Quinn; Thomas Cutler
- Producers: Lauren Stone Jackson; Alison Joy; Cassie Sagness; Marilyn Minton; Grace Ward; Jasmine Alston
- Cinematography: Brandon Riley; Dylan Wineland
- Editors: Jamie Canobbio; Francesca Kustra; Camilla Hayman; Salman Syed; Linda Lamm
- Running time: 42 minutes
- Production companies: Pantheon Media Group; Chick Entertainment; Velvet Hammer Media

Original release
- Network: Investigation Discovery
- Release: September 1 – September 2, 2025

Ruby & Jodi: A Cult of Sin and Influence is a 2025 American documentary series directed and produced by Olivia Crist Grant. It explores the disturbing relationship between YouTubers Ruby Franke and counselor Jodi Hildebrandt.

It premiered September 1, 2025, on Investigation Discovery.

== Premise ==
Explores the disturbing relationship between YouTubers Ruby Franke and counselor Jodi Hildebrandt. Hildenbrant's niece is among those interviewed.

== Episodes ==
No.	Title	Directed by	Original release date	U.S. viewers (millions)
1	"Meet the Frankes"	Olivia Crist Grant	September 1, 2025	0.426
2	"The Hildebrandt Method"	Olivia Crist Grant	September 1, 2025	0.426
3	"Truth and Distortion"	Olivia Crist Grant	September 2, 2025	0.421
4	"Honest, Responsible, Humble"	Olivia Crist Grant	September 2, 2025	0.421

== Production ==
In July 2025, it was announced Investigation Discovery had ordered the series, with Olivia Crist Grant directing.
