= Sharenting =

Parents sharing content about their children on social media

"Sharenting" is a portmanteau of "sharing" and "parenting", describing the practice of parents publicizing a large amount of potentially sensitive content about their children on internet platforms, most notably on social media. While the term was coined as recently as 2010, sharenting has become an international phenomenon with widespread presence in the United States, Spain, France, and the United Kingdom.

Proponents of sharenting frame the practice as a natural expression of parental pride in their children and argue that critics take sharenting-related posts out of context. Detractors find that it violates child privacy and hurts a parent–child relationship.

Academic research has been conducted over the potential social motivations for sharenting and legal frameworks to balance child privacy with this parental practice. Researchers have conducted several psychological surveys, outlining social media accessibility, parental self-identification with children, and social pressure as potential causes for sharenting. Legal scholars have identified international human rights laws, labor protections, and recent online child privacy statutes as potential legal standards to check sharenting abuses.

== History ==
The origins of the term "sharenting" have been attributed to the Wall Street Journal, where they called it "oversharenting," a portmanteau of "oversharing" and "parenting." Priya Kumar suggests that recording life moments of children rearing is not a new practice: people have been using diaries, scrapbooks and baby log books as the media of documentation for centuries. Scholars assert that sharenting has become popular as a result of social media, which has made many people more comfortable with sharing their lives and those of their children online. The trend of oversharing on social media has raised public attention in the 2010s and become the focus of a number of editorials and academic research projects. It was also added to Times Word of the Day in February 2013 and Collins English Dictionary in 2016 given its influence.

== Popularity ==
Several studies describe sharenting as an international phenomenon with widespread prevalence across households. In the United States, researchers at the University of Michigan C.S. Mott Children's Hospital found that almost 75% of American parents were familiar with someone who over-shared information about their child on social media, and an AVG survey determined that 92% of all American two-year-olds had some presence on the internet. In Australia, Fisher-Price conducted a survey which revealed that 90% of Australian parents admitted to over-sharing. In Spain and Czech Republic, a survey of approximately 1,500 parents found that 70-80% participated in sharenting. In the United Kingdom, France, Germany, and Italy, a Research Now report revealed that almost three-quarters of surveyed parents said that they were "willing to share images of their infants".

Some claim that sharenting presents a violation of child privacy, and this backlash includes anti-sharenting sites and apps that block baby pictures. One particular outlet of protest was the blog STFU Parents, founded in 2009 to criticize parental oversharing on social media. Some parents felt that these criticisms of sharenting often took posts out of context and neglected some positive aspects of the practice, including advancing a stronger sense of online community. Others, while acknowledging the potential privacy violations of sharenting, suggested a more tailored approach that would only permit posting under certain conditions, notwithstanding audience and identification restrictions for social media posts.

== Motivations ==
Research has suggested that sharenting is associated with a mix of parent self-identification with children, mothering pressures, and the accessibility of social media. Conducting 17 interviews with mothers in the United Kingdom, a London School of Economics study found that parent bloggers often re-explained their sharing practices in terms of expressing their own personal identity, representing their own child as part of themselves. In particular, the report surveyed the use of blogs as a networking vehicle to connect parents with similar family situations and found that sharenting parents, by filtering self-presentation through their parent-child relationship, adopted a more relational identity on social media websites. This included identifying oneself in terms of parental circumstances, whether it be raising a child with a disability or being a single mother. Alternatively, some have suggested that these online expressions indicate the infiltration of individual pride into the sphere of parenting, as family photography becomes a means to "show off" one's children to the others and strengthens a parent's sense of individuated self. Addressing the prevalence of mothers engaging in sharenting, those who purport this view argue that the rise of digital communication has pressured mothers into performing the role of a "good" parent on social media platforms. They claim that these developments may reinforce a dominant vision of a "normal" family, as sharenting posts could be motivated by the need to converge to a normative interpretation of family.

== Controversy ==
While some people assert that online platforms enable parents to establish a community and seek parenting support, others are concerned about the children's data privacy and their lack of informed consent. Sharing content may not only embarrass children but also creates an initial digital footprint, a history of online activity, that the children themselves have no control over. This might bring some negative consequences, such as being ridiculed at school or leaving a negative impression on future employers.

=== Parental benefits ===
Many parents use social media to seek parenting advice and share information about their children. With the convenience of online platforms, parent bloggers can easily connect with other people in similar situations as well as those who are willing to contribute meaningful advice. By forming a community, parents can receive encouragement from empathetic peers and assistance from experts in children rearing.

Parents whose children need special educational accommodations or have disabilities often found themselves detached from the mainstream parenting style. Therefore, they regard online blogs as a means to gain support from others and support back. Online blogging enables parents of children with disabilities and special needs to connect with other parents. The advice from similarly situated families can open up new possibilities that help the parents "negotiate the complexities of social services, health care, and schools". However, in some cases, posting online about a parent's struggles can cause a backlash, as advocates may accuse the parent of presenting people with that condition in a bad light, or wonder how the child will feel, if they later read these posts and see how much their parents struggled to care for them.

Such advantages of social media are not limited to particular groups of parents. In general, most parents benefit from exchanging parenting experience. Statistically speaking, 72% of parents rate social media useful for emotional connection and affirmations, and 74% of them receive support about parenting from friends on social media.

Sharenting also plays a role in fostering interpersonal relationships. As the images and words about children's lives initiate conversations, parents use sharenting to stay connected with distant friends and relatives. In particular, mothers, as a research study reveals, are willing to engage in sharenting since they believe that the positive contents can help avoid digital conflicts and maintain close relations with those in their social circles. Researchers also found that female participants in this study carefully chose photos and phrases to express love and present laudable behaviors of children in their updates, which indicates their intention to convey positive messages. These messages also promote a close social network for a child as the parents invites supportive family members and friends into daily life.

=== Children's privacy ===
Given the potential misuse of digital data, people are critical about sharenting, and the majority of parents are cautious about the wrongdoing with online posts. The disclosure of minors' personal information, such as geographic location, name, date of birth, pictures, and the schools they attend, might expose them to illegal practices by recipients with malicious intentions. Sharented information is often abused for "identity theft", when imposters manage to track, stalk, commit fraud against children, or even blackmail the family. According to Barclays, online fraud targeting the young generation will contribute to a loss of £670 million (approximately $790 million) by 2030, and two-thirds of identity fraud will be related to sharenting. Additionally, some people collect children's images from social media in order to produce pornographic content.

Violation of data privacy within a legal framework is also worth concern. When users accept the privacy policies of social media platforms, tech companies as well as some affiliated organizations are entitled to track and transmit some part of users' data, a fact that most parent bloggers tend to neglect. Sharented information can be used for developing advertising and marketing strategies against children, developing new algorithms for surveillance systems, tracking a family for immigration enforcement action, predicting misbehavior of some kids, etc. Practices of such kinds by third parties trigger a public debate on whether accessing and selling users' data infringes their rights – especially for minors who have little autonomy over their private information.

In addition, digital kidnapping (when imposters copy photos to their social media accounts and pretend to be the parents or friends of minors) makes adults uncomfortable. "Digital kidnappers" revel in the rapid increase of "likes" and popularity through this kind of role playing, without considering privacy issues.

=== Children's digital footprint ===
Due to the prevalence of sharenting, children develop a digital footprint from a young age, composed of social media content that may damage their confidence later in life. In particular, a study by University of Michigan evinces that over half of the participants have shared embarrassing contents about children online and 27% of them have shared photos that are deemed potentially inappropriate. These posts can become a source of ridicule among teenagers. Moreover, college admission officers and potential employers may happen to access the inappropriate materials, which could shape their impression on a young candidate and negatively affect academic or career opportunities. Critics also argue that sharenting fails to fully respect children's autonomy over their persona and influences how children are likely to feel as they develop own their social media accounts.

=== Disagreement over consent ===
In regard to whether parents can post some material online, children and parents sometimes maintain conflicting expectations. Research studies show that children are often annoyed or frustrated about sharenting. In a survey of 1000 British teenagers, about 70% said that their parents failed to give enough respect towards their digital identity, and 40% said they felt embarrassed by photos that parents posted online. Law professor Stacy Steinberg said that minors strive to protect their private information from public exposure—in particular, content that may be potentially inappropriate—and thus may not agree with their parents' relatively facile decisions to share them on social media, regardless of their parents' intention.

Consent is the pivotal issue in the debate around parents' rights to disclose children's information. Interviews with some pre-teens reveal that many parents share children's pictures without permission and tend to reject children's requests to remove posts that the child dislikes. Interviews with mothers confirmed the trend. They believed that as parents and adults, they have the discretion to decide what information to share while making everything in control. Therefore, as children's rights to preserve some information are not properly respected, parents' oversharing can harm children's trust on parents. Disagreements may also arise due to differences in the severity or type of privacy violation.

== Applicable legislation ==
There appears to be little guiding legislation regarding parents' online control over their children's media. While different countries have their respective laws to protect children's privacy, most hand over the responsibility to the children's guardians, which sharenting may exploit as the parent is able to take advantage of their child's power to consent. This presumption in favor of the parent fails to protect the child's privacy from their parents.

Under the Convention on the Rights of the Child, the United Nations broadly advocates for a child's individual identity. Article 14 outlines the applicable legal guardians' duty to represent the child's best interest.

=== Europe ===
In 2018, the General Data Protection Regulation (GDPR) was made official within the European Union to protect individual privacy in the digital space. Under Article 8, "holder of parental" responsibility is given consent for children less than 16 years old. GDPR's Recital 18 cites that the regulation of content does not apply to "personal or household activities" as long as there is no commercialization.

In 2020, the Dutch courts ruled in favor of the parent after a grandmother had posted media of her grandchild online without the parent's consent. Since these social media posts could be distributed to third parties, the court found it difficult to protect these posts as "personal or household activities" under Recital 18. Nonetheless, the court declared that the grandmother's sharenting was illegal under the European Union's bylaws.

=== United States of America ===
In the United States, the Children's Online Privacy Protection Act (COPPA) was enacted in 1998 to protect the data collection of children under the age of 13. YouTube went under fire in 2019 after the Federal Trade Commission (FTC) found the media platform was violating COPPA by sharing children's information without parental consent. Some senators argued that this ruling weakened children's right to their own digital data privacy by further emphasizing parental power over children online.

Currently, COPPA only handles privacy matters for children under 13. Sharenting is a widely unregulated topic under COPPA since the legislation presumes that parents are the primary protectors of their children's privacy. Rather than protecting children's data from their parents, COPPA focuses on the protection of data from corporations.

Illinois' Biometric Information Privacy Act (BIPA) protects Illinois residents' biometric data such as fingerprints and facial scans by requiring consent before service usage, limiting the companies' amount of data collection, and giving individuals the right to sue. In 2020, Google was sued for violating BIPA and COPPA by collecting biometric data of Illinois children, mostly under the age of 13, through school-provided ChromeBooks. The violation was made by the collection without consent of the children nor their parents. COPPA's requirement of "verifiable parental consent" was relevant under Google's alleged violation for the children under 13. While the photos are not protected by BIPA, scanning them was a breach of one's biometric privacy.

California Consumer Privacy Act (CCPA) was made effective in 2020 to further regulate privacy rights for California residents. While the act, like COPPA, requires parental/guardian consent for children under 13, affirmative consent is required for children between the ages 13 to 16.

While YouTube has pledged to work with the National Center for Missing and Exploited Children to convict accounts suspected of harm to children, sharenting in the realm of family vlogging is uncharted territory. There are child labor laws set in place, albeit varying by state, that limit working hours and payment distribution. However, the blurred lines of family vlogging makes it difficult to log hours to calculate pay and labor-intensive hours. The Fair Labor Standards Act that protects children against "oppressive child labor" is yet to be updated to the varied labor-intensive work on social media.

Because family vlog channels are essentially self-employable markets, there are no strict child labor laws similar to child actors on set. In 2017, parents of FamilyOFive, a popular YouTube family channel, were sentenced to probation on child neglect charges. The family vloggers were monetizing their videos, which focused around pranks that would often get physical amongst and/or towards their children. The parents were accused of neglect of their 9 and 11-year-old children. The psychological consequences – rather than the physical consequences – of filming the pranking incidents were the basis of the claims. The psychologist on trial found "observable, identifiable, and substantial impairments of their mental or psychological ability to function". The long-term consequences of sharenting on children are still yet to be fully analyzed as social media is still a relatively newfound boundary.
