= Gravelle foster child abuse cases =

American convicts

Michael and Sharen Gravelle were the adoptive parents of eleven children in Clarksfield Township, Ohio, United States. In 2003, they were indicted for child abuse for, among other things, keeping the children in cage-like enclosures. The Gravelles claimed the cages were made to protect the children from each other.

== Cases ==
Their trial motivated legislators in Ohio to pass laws to prevent people from adopting a large number of children without significant oversight by the state. They used parenting methods similar to those used in attachment therapy, which involves very strict control of children using isolation, food deprivation, and other disciplinary measures that are widely considered to be unreasonably harsh, or even inhumane. The trial gained international attention and brought many inadequacies of the adoption services systems in Ohio to the fore.

In 2005, the Gravelles were sentenced to two years in prison for their crimes. According to newspaper reports, their therapist, Elaine Thompson, a social worker practicing as an attachment therapist, advised the Gravelles on parenting techniques. Thompson, according to these reports, had undertaken counselling or therapy, including holding therapy, with some of the Gravelle children. Elaine Thompson was indicted along with the Gravelles but pleaded guilty to misdemeanors in a plea bargain.

The Gravelles served their two-year sentences from April 2009 to March 2011.

== See also ==
- Jodi Hildebrandt
- Ruby Franke
