= Turpin case =

Abuse case in California

- Duration: 1988–2018
- Location: Perris, California, U.S.
- Type: Torture of own children
- Perpetrators: David Allen Turpin and Louise Ann Turpin
- Injuries: 13
- Convictions: Torture, false imprisonment, abuse of a dependent adult, child abuse
- Sentence: Life imprisonment with the possibility of parole after 25 years

The Turpin case involved the abuse of children and dependent adults by their biological parents, Dave and Louise Turpin of Perris, California, US. The ages of the 13 victims ranged from 2 to 29 years old. On January 14, 2018, one of the daughters, then-17-year-old Jordan Turpin, escaped and called local police, who then raided the residence and discovered disturbing evidence. Given the number of dependents involved, the degree of abuse, and its protracted nature, occurring over decades, the story garnered significant national and international attention. Experts in family abuse considered the case to be extraordinary for many reasons.

In February 2019, both Turpin parents pleaded guilty on 14 felony counts, including abuse of a dependent adult, child abuse, torture, and false imprisonment. In April, they were sentenced to life imprisonment with the possibility of parole after 25 years.

== Background ==
David Allen Turpin (born October 17, 1961) was formerly a computer engineer who graduated from Virginia Tech and had worked for Lockheed Martin and Northrop Grumman. He met his wife, Louise Ann (née Robinette, born May 24, 1968), at Princeton High School in Princeton, West Virginia. The couple married in Pearisburg, Virginia, in 1985, when David was 23 years old and Louise was 16 years old.

The Turpins originally identified as Pentecostal Christians, and as part of their beliefs, the couple had numerous children because "God called on them" to do so. They had ten daughters and three sons between 1988 and 2015. The couple later left the church and it is claimed by a relative (Teresa Robinette) that the couple experimented with other lifestyles, including witchcraft and swinging.

== Abuse ==
=== Texas ===
The Turpin family lived in Fort Worth, Texas, until 1999, when they moved to Rio Vista, Texas. In 2007, the Turpin parents moved 10 of their children into an isolated trailer on their property. David and Louise took the two youngest and left the rest of the children to fend for themselves, bringing groceries on a weekly basis but not enough to feed everybody. One of their daughters, Jordan Turpin, aged six years at the time, stated there was "a lot of starving", and she had resorted to eating "ketchup or mustard or ice". After the family left the Rio Vista property in 2010, neighbors found feces and beds with ropes tied to them, along with dead dogs and piles of garbage.

=== California ===
In 2014, the Turpins moved to Perris, California. Neighbors reported that the children were silent unless spoken to, "like children whose only defense was to be invisible"; would skip rather than walk; and appeared malnourished and pale.

One of Louise's sisters later said that David and Louise refused to let her see the children, and another sister said she had been concerned about the children's weight, but Louise's aunt said the family pictures posted on Facebook had made her think that "they were one big happy family."

David and Louise had been planning to move the family to Oklahoma at the time of their arrest. Jordan Turpin overheard her parents speaking about the move and decided it was time to call the police.

=== Escape and rescue ===
By 2018, the Turpin children had been planning to escape their parents' Perris, California, residence for more than two years. On January 14, 2018, two of the girls left the house through a window. The younger girl (age 13) became frightened and turned back, but Jordan, then 17, got some distance away and called 911 on a deactivated cell phone she had brought with her. She told the dispatcher that she and her siblings were being abused by their parents and that the smell in the house was so bad sometimes she could barely breathe. She stated that two of her sisters and one of her brothers were currently chained to their beds. When the first police officer arrived, Jordan showed him photos of conditions inside the house.

Deputies of the Riverside County Sheriff's Department knocked on the door, Louise and David answered, and the deputies stated they were there for a "welfare check". Louise was "perplexed as to why we were at that residence", said a sheriff's deputy. Once inside, they encountered the stench of human excrement, decaying garbage, dead pets, and moldy food, with every surface covered in trash. Later, they found the other 12 children; one had been shackled to a bed for weeks, and it appeared that two others had been shackled until just before officers arrived. Children were found with bruises on their arms, appearing frail, and caked with dirt. The children were so malnourished that deputies thought all 13 were under 18 years old at the time, when in fact 7 of the 13 were over 18 on January 14, 2018 (Note: Jordan Turpin was 17 at that time. On November 16, 2018, she became the 8th Turpin child to turn 18, reducing the number of minors at that time from 6 to 5.). The house contained hundreds of journals written by the children about their lives.

=== Nature of the crimes ===
For years, David and Louise Turpin imprisoned, beat, and strangled their children, allowing them to eat only once a day and bathe only once a year. The older children appeared much younger because of malnourishment; the 29-year-old (Jennifer) weighed just 82 pounds (37 kg). The 12-year-old child had an arm circumference equivalent to that of a 4-month-old baby. Some appeared to lack basic knowledge of the world and had a limited vocabulary, for example being unfamiliar with what "medication" was (in the case of Jordan), or who police were.

The case is considered "extraordinary for numerous reasons", including that abuse was inflicted on multiple children (as well as dependent adults) by both parents, and the calculated and systematic nature of the abuse and torture.

== Legal proceedings ==
The Turpins were charged with 12 counts of torture, 12 counts of false imprisonment, seven counts of abuse of a dependent adult, and six counts of child abuse; David received an additional charge of a lewd act on a child under 14. Their bail was set at $9 million for Louise Turpin and $12 million for David Turpin, and they remained in custody. David was eventually charged with perjury in relation to affidavits he filed with the California Department of Education over the years, in which he asserted that his children were being educated in a private school. Louise's attorney requested Louise be placed in a pretrial diversion program for mental health treatment due to a diagnosis of histrionic personality disorder; the judge denied the request on the grounds that Turpin posed a risk to the public.

On February 22, 2019, David and Louise each changed their not-guilty pleas to guilty to one count of torture, three counts of willful child abuse, four counts of false imprisonment, and six counts of cruelty to an adult dependent. Both were sentenced to life imprisonment with the possibility of parole after 25 years. Experts believe they will never receive parole due to the severity of the crime.

David was originally sent to the Mule Creek State Prison before being sent to the California State Prison, Corcoran, while Louise was originally sent to the Central California Women's Facility before being sent to the California Institution for Women, where they both remain as of 2026.

== Aftermath ==
All the children spent two months in the hospital, after which the six minors were placed in two foster homes. Physicians treated various issues, including heart damage due to lack of nutrients, cognitive impairments, and neuropathy.

In October 2019, five of the younger children were fostered by an abusive family. Allegations included "hitting them in the face with sandals, pulling their hair, hitting them with a belt, and striking their heads". They alleged they were forced to eat excessively and then forced to eat "their own vomit", and the foster father was accused of "grabbing and fondling" them and "kissing them on the mouth".

In early 2020, the Riverside County Deputy District Attorney reported that the children were living independently, working, and going to school, and that one had graduated from college.

An investigation for the ABC news magazine 20/20 chronicled the case for the November 2021 special Escape from a House of Horror. The investigation reported that some of the Turpin children were neglected by Riverside County social services, some are homeless, and none are authorized to use the hundreds of thousands of dollars donated to them. The money was placed in a trust controlled by a court-appointed public guardian (Vanessa Espinoza). Joshua Turpin stated that he could not access the funds and was denied the purchase of a bicycle. During an interview with Diane Sawyer for the 20/20 special, Jordan Turpin stated that she was released without warning from a foster home with no life skills, no plans for housing, or knowledge of how to obtain food and healthcare. According to the report, Riverside County has hired a private law firm to investigate allegations of abuse by social services.

In July 2022, the Turpin siblings filed lawsuits in California's Riverside County Superior Court against the foster care agency that placed them in a home where they were allegedly subjected to further abuse and neglect. Two nearly identical lawsuits were filed, with one representing the two older siblings and the other representing the four younger siblings. Riverside County, Foster Family Network, and ChildNet Youth and Family Services were named as defendants in the lawsuit.

The Riverside County sheriff's department had already been investigating the foster home, which included nine alleged victims, since early 2021. On September 19, 2024, three of the foster parents pleaded guilty to the charges of abuse. Marcelino Olguin pleaded guilty to three counts of lewd and lascivious acts on a child under 14, one count of child endangerment and one count of false imprisonment, while Olguin's wife Rosa and daughter Lennys pleaded guilty to child endangerment and false imprisonment. On October 18, Marcelino was sentenced to seven years in state prison, and Rosa and Lennys were sentenced to four years of probation.

== Depiction in media ==
- The Family Next Door by John Glatt, published by St. Martin's Press in 2019, outlines the case.
- Law & Order: Special Victims Unit S19E20 "The Book of Esther" is loosely based on the case.
- Evil Lives Here S06E08 "My Twisted Sister" interviews Louise Turpin's younger sister Elizabeth Flores.
- 9-1-1, S03E06 "Monsters" (airdate October 29, 2019) loosely based on the case.
- In 2024, Jennifer Turpin, the oldest of the Turpin children, published the book Where Was God?, recounting her experiences while maintaining her faith in God despite the trauma.

== See also ==
- List of long-term false imprisonment cases
- 2021 Munster abuse case
- Fritzl case, similar case occurring a decade prior in Austria
- Genie (feral child)
- Kimberly Sullivan case, another well known case of long term captivity
- Siders case, similar case occurring a decade later in Ohio.
