= Aggravation (law) =

Term used in law

Aggravation, in law, is "any circumstance attending the commission of a crime or tort which increases its guilt or enormity or adds to its injurious consequences, but which is above and beyond the essential constituents of the crime or tort itself".

Aggravated assault, for example, is usually differentiated from simple assault by the offender's intent (e.g., to murder or to rape), the extent of injury to the victim, or the use of a deadly weapon. An aggravating circumstance is a kind of attendant circumstance and the opposite of an extenuating or mitigating circumstance, which decreases guilt.

In the UK, the Criminal Justice Act 2003 requires a court to consider (a) relevant previous convictions, (b) racial or religious aggravation, and (c) hostility towards the victim or to persons generally based on sexual orientation (or presumed sexual orientation) or disability (or presumed disability) when determining sentence for a conviction.

In canon law, "aggravation" was a form of censure, threatening excommunication after three disregarded admonitions.

== See also ==
- Hate crime
- Mitigating factor
