= Bedside sleeper =

Bed for an infant attached to bed in which parent sleeps

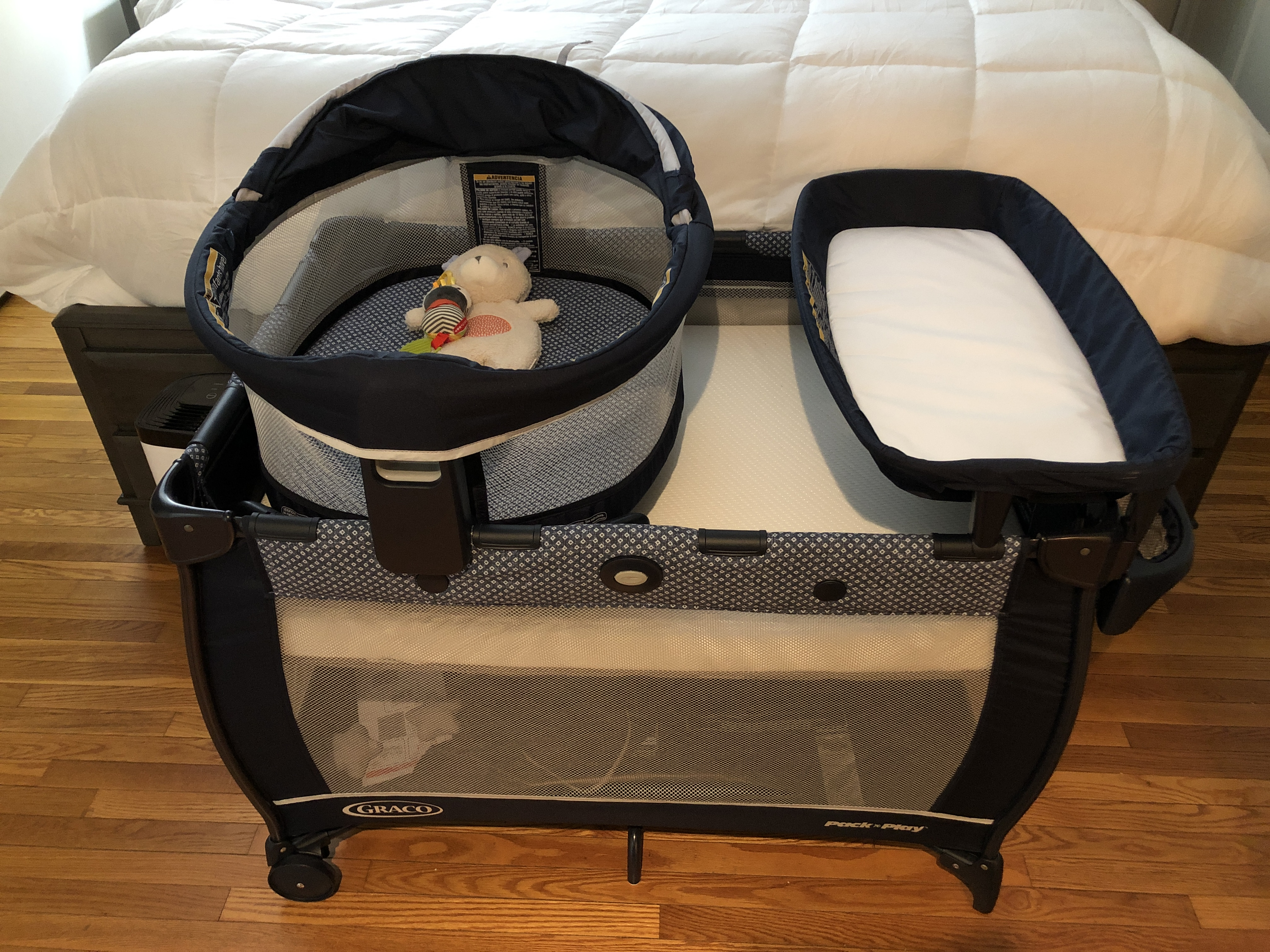
A crib which can be configured as a bedside bassinet

A bedside sleeper, also referred to as a sidecar sleeper or bedside bassinet, is a bassinet or baby cot that attaches to the parents' bed, allowing newborns to sleep next to their parents safely. This is a form of safe co-sleeping, and has little risks associated with sudden infant death syndrome, unlike bedsharing. Bedside sleepers are a component of rooming-in, a practice followed in hospitals to keep the baby by the mother's bed, giving her time to establish a stronger bond with her baby.

A bedside sleeper is defined by the United States government as "a rigid frame assembly secured to an adult bed that is intended to provide a sleeping environment for infants." Usually, one wall of the bedside sleeper is lower than the others, which allows the parent to easily reach for the child at night. Most bedside sleepers are multi-mode, meaning that they can be converted into bassinets and/or play yards.

== Types ==
=== Bedside bassinet ===
A bedside bassinet tends to have four sides, like a regular baby crib. It can be positioned near the parents' bed as an unattached bedside bassinet, or attached to the bed. This arrangement allows parents to more easily attend to their baby during the night. Because bedside bassinets have four rails, quick, easy access to the occupant can still be limited.

=== Bedside sleeper or sidecar ===
A bedside sleeper or sidecar is similar to a bedside bassinet in that it attaches to the parents' bed, but only has three crib walls, which allows the baby to sleep at the same height as the parents, and there is no obstruction to reaching out for the baby. Bedside sleepers allow parents to keep the baby close without it sleeping in the dimensional space of the family bed.

== History ==
Co-sleeping is an ancient practice whereby babies sleep close to their parents and not in a different room, where they can sense another's presence. According to the Natural Child Project, co-sleeping is an unquestioned practice in much of southern Europe, Asia, Africa and Central and South America. However, one of the most common types of co-sleeping is bedsharing, which can be dangerous.

The American Academy of Pediatrics encourages room-sharing (sleeping in the same room but on separate surfaces), but it recommends against bed-sharing with infants, due to instances of SIDS. In a study of 321 SIDS cases, the British Medical Journal indicated that the largest percentage of SIDS cases arose from babies who slept in a different room than the parents, suggesting that co-sleeping on a separate surface is the safest method of infant sleep. Co-sleeping—sleeping with a baby nearby—is gaining popularity in the United States. Bedside sleepers were created to allow parents and babies to gain the benefits of co-sleeping while minimizing instances of SIDS.

== Scientific benefits of co-sleeping ==
- Promotes breastfeeding: A 1997 study found that infants who slept near their parents breastfed approximately three times longer during the night than infants who slept separately.
- Promotes peaceful sleep: Infants who co-sleep were found to rarely cry during the night compared to infants who slept in a separate room, who startled throughout the night and spent four times more minutes crying than co-sleeping infants.
- Decreased risk of sudden infant death syndrome (SIDS): Babies who sleep next to the parents' bed have four times less chance of SIDS.

== Concerns ==
Like other infant sleep products, bedside sleepers may also pose various risks to babies of all shapes and sizes. The main issue that most bedside sleeper users and manufacturers must consider is the risk that a baby might fall into a gap between the bedside sleeper and the adult bed mattress, which could cause entrapment injuries and/or strangulation.
