= Infant sleep =

Sleep in infant humans

Infant sleep is an act of sleeping by an infant or a newborn. It differs significantly from sleep during adulthood. Unlike in adults, sleep early in infancy initially does not follow a circadian rhythm. Infant sleep also appears to have two main modes - active, associated with movement, and quiet, associated with stillness - exhibiting distinct neurological firing patterns. Sleep duration is also shorter. As the infant ages, sleep begins to follow a circadian rhythm and sleep duration increases. Infants nap frequently. Infants are also particularly vulnerable during sleep; they are prone to suffocation and SIDS. As a result, "safe" sleep techniques have been the subject of several public health campaigns. Infant sleep practices vary widely between cultures and over history; historically infants would sleep on the ground with their parents. In many modern cultures, infants sleep in a variety of types of infant beds or share a bed with parents. Infant sleep disturbance is common, and even normal infant sleep patterns can cause considerable disruption to parents' sleep.

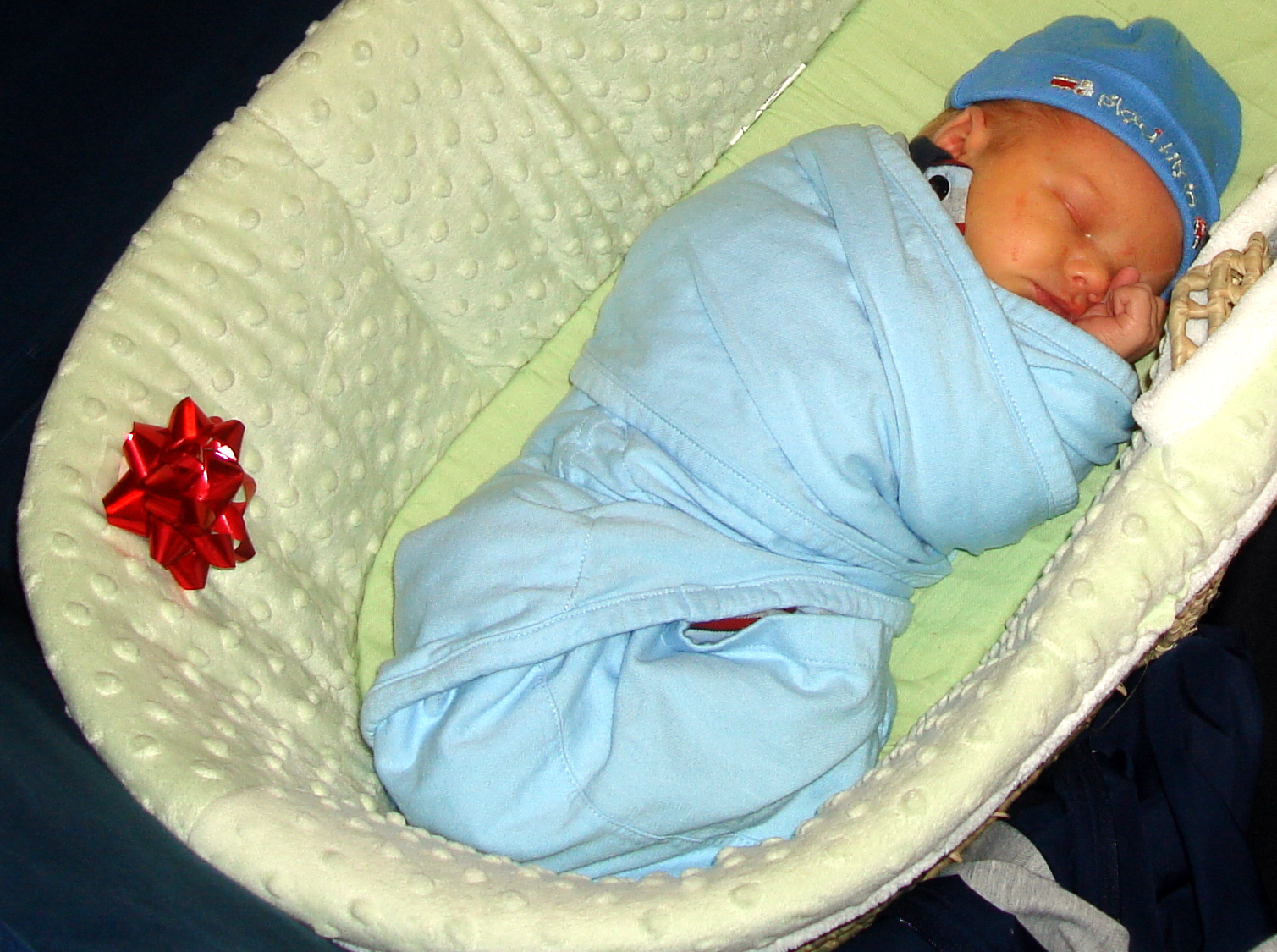
Swaddled infant sleeping in a Moses basket. The infant is on his back as per safe sleep recommendations.

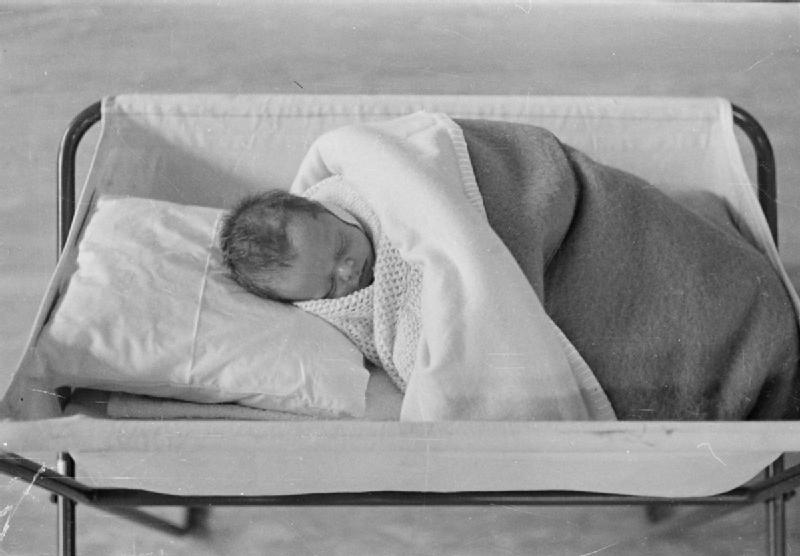
An infant sleeping in 1940. The use of pillows and blankets is no longer recommended as these can inadvertently cause suffocation.

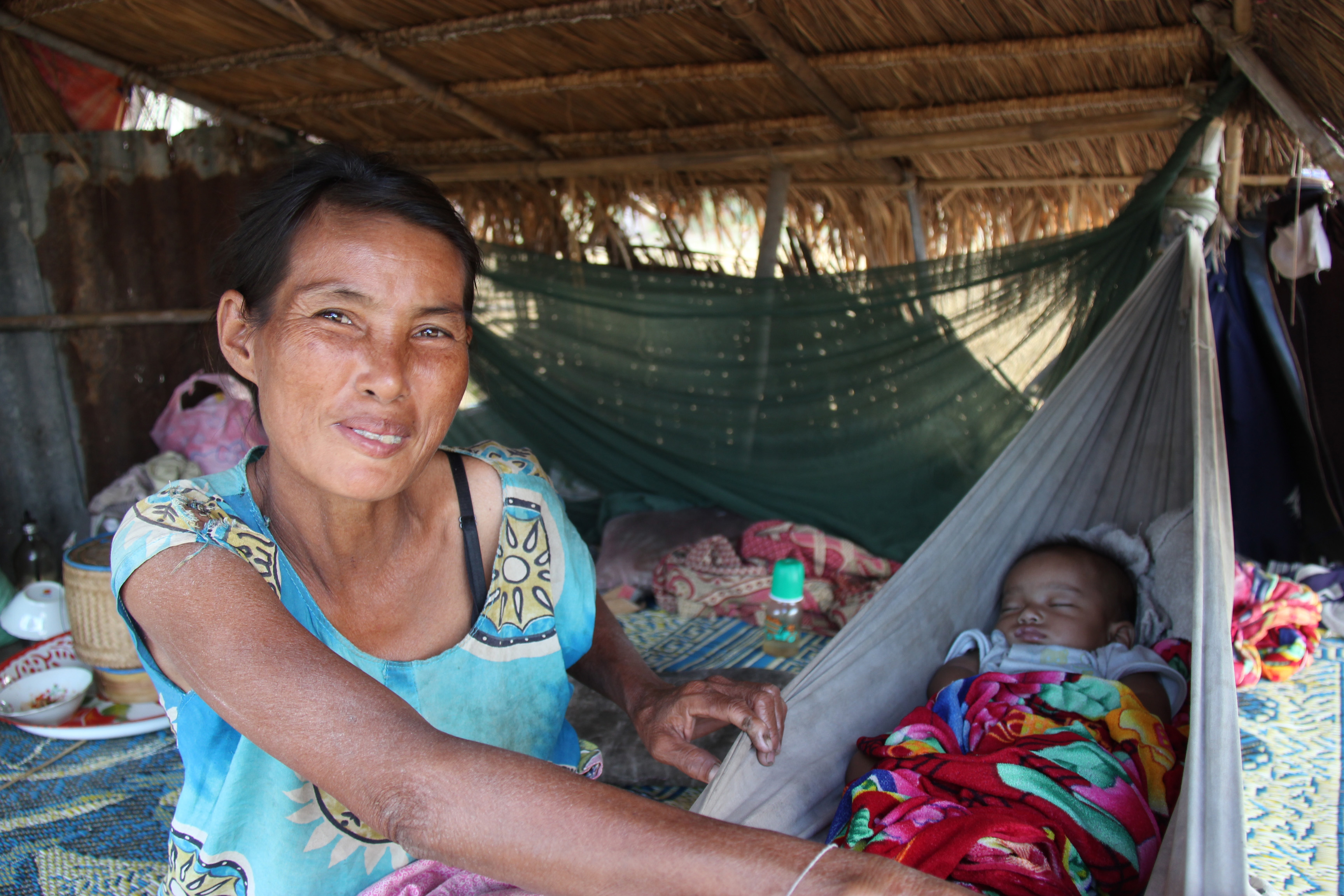
Baby sleeps in a hammock in a hut in Laos.

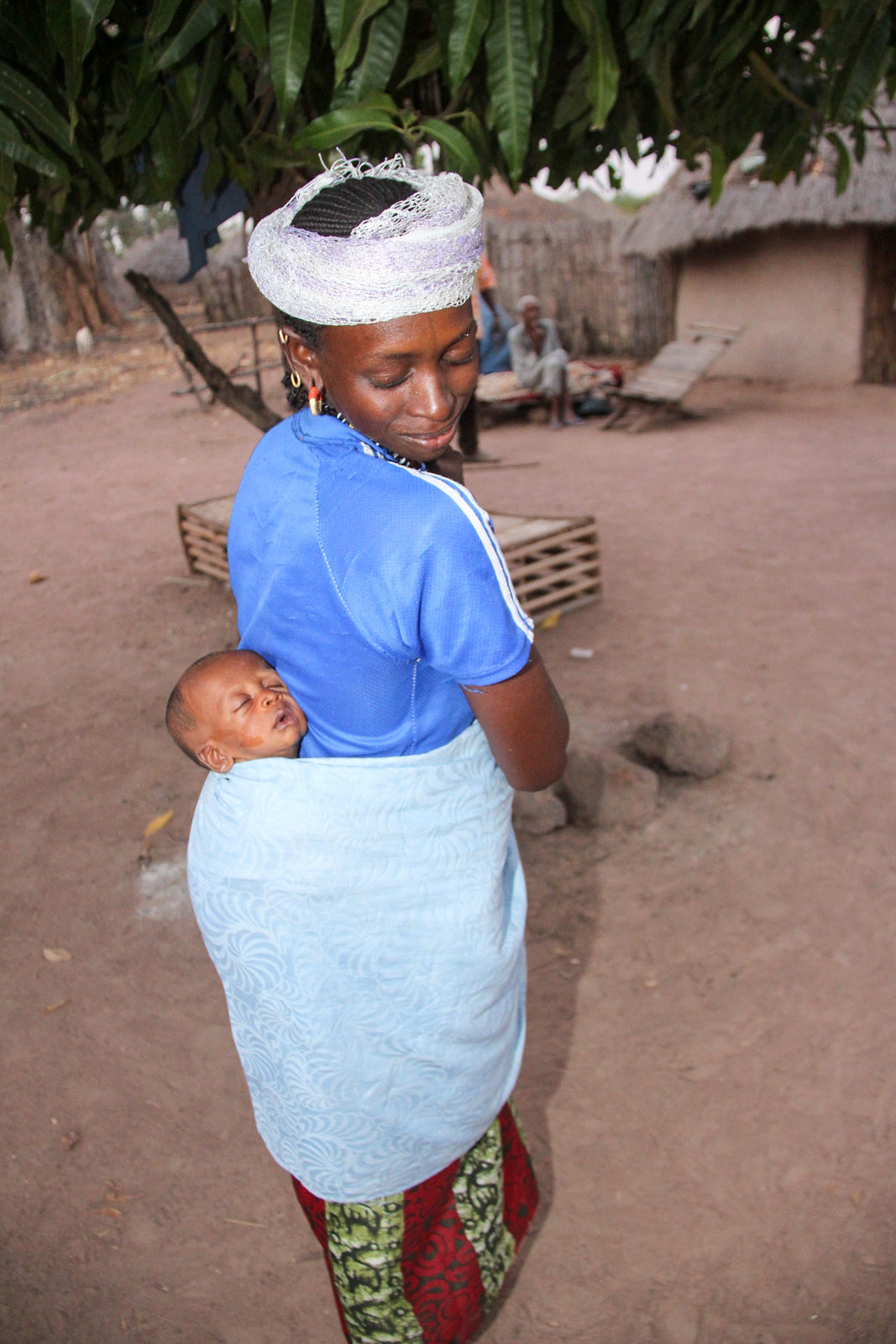
Infants frequently sleep whilst being worn.

== Normal infant sleep ==
In the first week of life, infants will sleep during both the day and night and will wake to feed because they are unaware that people sleep at night. The part of the brain that controls the circadian sleep cycle is not yet fully developed. Sleep cycle duration is usually short, from 2–4 hours. Over the first two weeks, infants average 16–18 hours of sleep daily. Circadian rhythm has not yet been established and infants sleep during the night and day equally. In the first month of life, 95% of infants will wake during the night. At around 2 months, a day-night pattern begins to gradually develop. At around 3 months, sleep cycle may increase to 3–6 hours, and the majority of infants will still wake in the night to feed. By 4 months, the average infant sleeps 14 hours a day (including naps), but this amount can vary considerably. By 8 months, most infants continue to wake during the night, though a majority are able to fall back asleep without parental involvement. At 9 months, only a third of infants sleep through the night without waking. Daytime sleeping (naps) generally doesn't cease until 3 to 5 years of age.

7 week old infant in active sleep

Infant sleep in the first year can be categorised into active sleep (AS) and quiet sleep (QS). Active sleep is similar to the adult REM sleep in that it is characterised by eye and other kinds of movement; however, unlike adults in REM, infants tend to enter AS at the beginning of their sleep cycle, as opposed to the end of it like REM in adults. Infants spend about half their time in AS/REM and half in QS, a much higher proportion than adults, who only spend about a quarter of their time in REM. It's hypothesised this difference in sleep pattern is related to the shorter sleep cycles and more frequent waking of infants. By 3 months infants become more likely to enter quiet sleep (or NREM, not-REM) at the beginning of their sleep cycle. After 3 months, infants tend to alternate between AS/QS for 50 minutes duration, as opposed to the longer cycle in adult sleep (90 minutes). Sleep cycle duration starts to resemble adult sleep more at 6 months, but doesn't fully resemble adult sleep until around 3 years old, which is generally around the time napping ceases as well.

Frequent night waking and the short sleep cycle in infants is thought to be adaptive. Because infants have small stomachs and are undergoing rapid growth, they need to eat very frequently in order to get enough nutrition. Frequent night awakenings are also protective against SIDS.Newborns may fall back asleep immediately after feeding, or they may stay awake and play for a considerable time. Some newborns will feel tired after 1 to 1.5 hours of waking. Others will remain awake and alert for even longer.
