= World Journal of Pediatrics =

- Discipline: Pediatrics
- Language: English
- Edited by: Zheng-Yan Zhao, Qiang Shu

Publication details
- History: Since 2005
- Publisher: Springer Science+Business Media on behalf of Children's Hospital, Zhejiang University School of Medicine
- Frequency: Monthly
- Open access: Hybrid
- Impact factor: 7.3 (2025)

Standard abbreviations
- ISO 4: World J. Pediatr.

Indexing
- CODEN: WJPOAG
- ISSN: 1708-8569 (print); 1867-0687 (web)
- OCLC no.: 1058288205

Links
- Journal homepage; Online archive

The World Journal of Pediatrics is a monthly peer-reviewed medical journal covering clinical practice and research in pediatrics, including pediatric surgery, preventive healthcare, pharmacology, stomatology, and biomedicine, with a particular focus on internal medicine. It is published by Springer Science+Business Media on behalf of the Children’s Hospital, Zhejiang University School of Medicine and the editors-in-chief are Zheng-Yan Zhao and Qiang Shu (Children’s Hospital, Zhejiang University School of Medicine).

== History ==
The journal was established in 2005 and initially published quarterly. It became bimonthly 2017 and monthly in 2022. In 2009, the journal began its cooperation with Springer for online publication.

== Notable articles ==
The journal publishes one to two thematic issues annually, focusing on emerging and clinically relevant topics in pediatrics. Special issues have covered areas such as pediatric sleep health, severe acute hepatitis in children, pediatric COVID-19,, autoimmune and rheumatic diseases, and obesity and diabetes in children and adolescents. The journal also publishes pediatric clinical guidelines and expert consensus statements. In 2024, it published the Guidelines for the Diagnosis and Treatment of Neurally Mediated Syncope in Children and Adolescents (revised 2024), which was recognized among the China Top Seven Advances in Pediatrics of 2024 by the Chinese Pediatric Society of the Chinese Medical Association. According to the Web of Science, the 5 most cited articles published during 2021-2025 are:

- Asadi-Pooya, Ali A.; Nemati, Hamid; Shahisavandi, Mina; Akbari, Ali; Emami, Amir; Lotfi, Mehrzad; Rostamihosseinkhani, Mahtab; Barzegar, Zohreh; Kabiri, Maryam; Zeraatpisheh, Zahra; Farjoud-Kouhanjani, Mohsen; Jafari, Anahita; Sasannia, Fateme; Ashrafi, Shayan; Nazeri, Masoume (2021-09-03). "Long COVID in children and adolescents". World Journal of Pediatrics. 17 (5): 495–499. doi:10.1007/s12519-021-00457-6. PMC 8414448. PMID 34478045.
- Yan, Chao; Xue, Guan-Hua; Zhao, Han-Qing; Feng, Yan-Ling; Cui, Jing-Hua; Yuan, Jing (2024). "Current status of Mycoplasma pneumoniae infection in China". World Journal of Pediatrics. 20 (1): 1–4. doi:10.1007/s12519-023-00783-x. PMC 10827902. PMID 38185707.
- Wang, Wei; Liu, Chun-Feng (2023-10-01). "Sepsis heterogeneity". World Journal of Pediatrics. 19 (10): 919–927. doi:10.1007/s12519-023-00689-8. PMID 36735197.
- Feng, Jing; Tian, Qing-Feng; He, Yan; Nie, Zhi-Qiang; Liu, Jun-An; Song, Fu-Jian; Lu, Zu-Xun (2022-03-01). "Maternal smoking status during pregnancy and low birth weight in offspring: systematic review and meta-analysis of 55 cohort studies published from 1986 to 2020". World Journal of Pediatrics. 18 (3): 176–185. doi:10.1007/s12519-021-00501-5. PMID 35089538.
- Zhang, Qing-You; Xu, Bo-Wen; Du, Jun-Bao (2021). "Similarities and differences between multiple inflammatory syndrome in children associated with COVID-19 and Kawasaki disease: clinical presentations, diagnosis, and treatment". World Journal of Pediatrics. 17 (4): 335–340. doi:10.1007/s12519-021-00435-y. PMC 8134825. PMID 34013488.

== Abstracting and indexing ==
The journal is abstracted and indexed in:

- Chemical Abstracts Service
- EBSCO databases
- Embase
- Index Medicus/MEDLINE/PubMed
- Science Citation Index Expanded
- Scopus

According to the Journal Citation Reports, the journal has a 2025 impact factor of 7.3, ranking 4/190 in the category of Pediatrics.
