= Blood type (disambiguation) =

Blood type is a classification of blood based on the presence and absence of antibodies.

Blood type or Blood Type may also refer to:

- Blood Type (album) (Gruppa krovi), an album by the Soviet rock band Kino
- "Blood Type", a song from the album Against All Odds (Tragedy Khadafi album)
- Blood Type: Blue (also called Blue Christmas), a 1978 Japanese science fiction film

== See also ==
- Blood type (non-human)
- Blood typing—test to identify blood types
- Human blood group systems
