= Cradle (bed) =

Infant bed or cot, usually on rockers

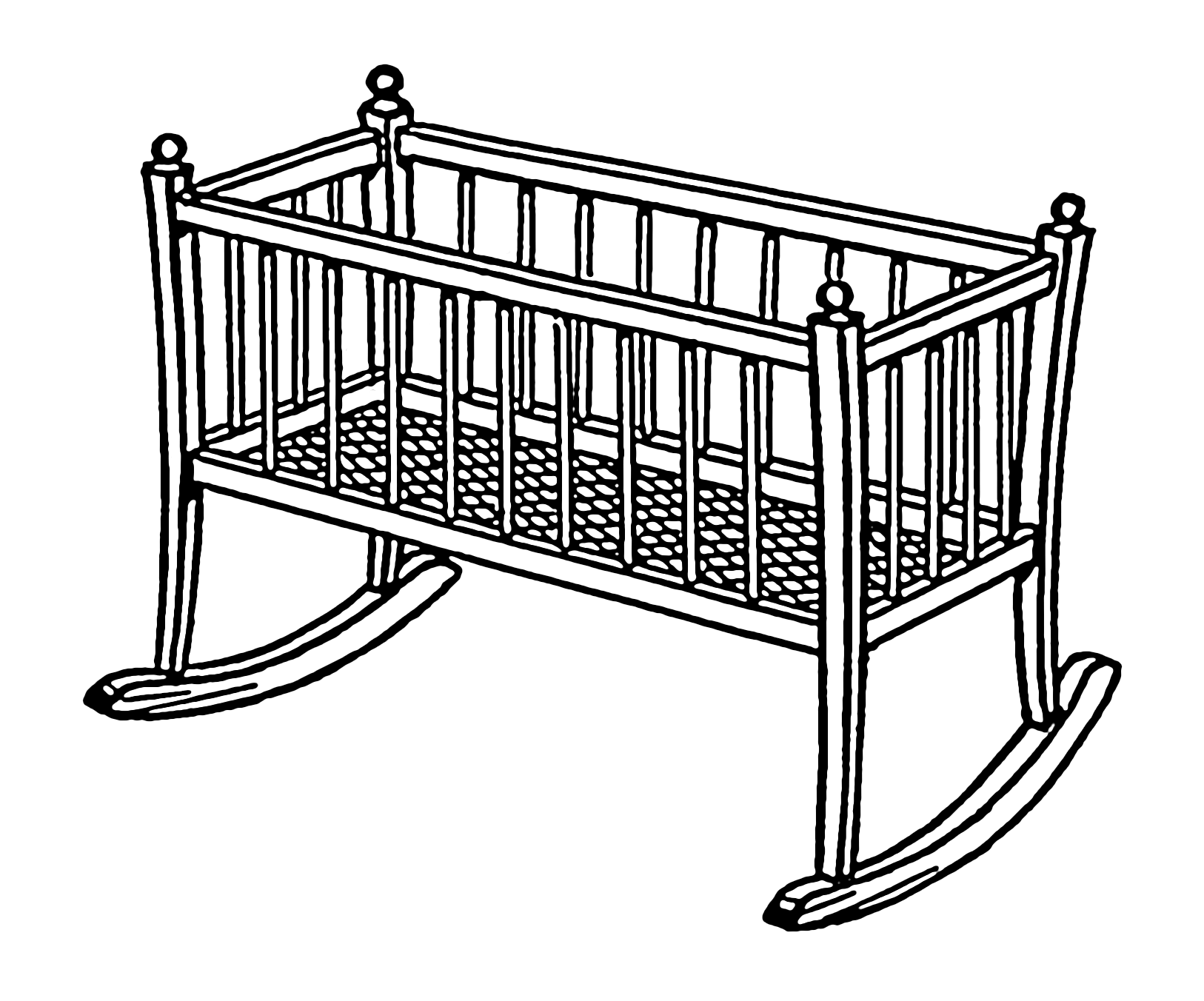
Rocking cradle

A cradle is an infant bed which rocks but is non-mobile. It is distinct from a typical bassinet which is a basket-like container on free-standing legs with wheels.

== History ==
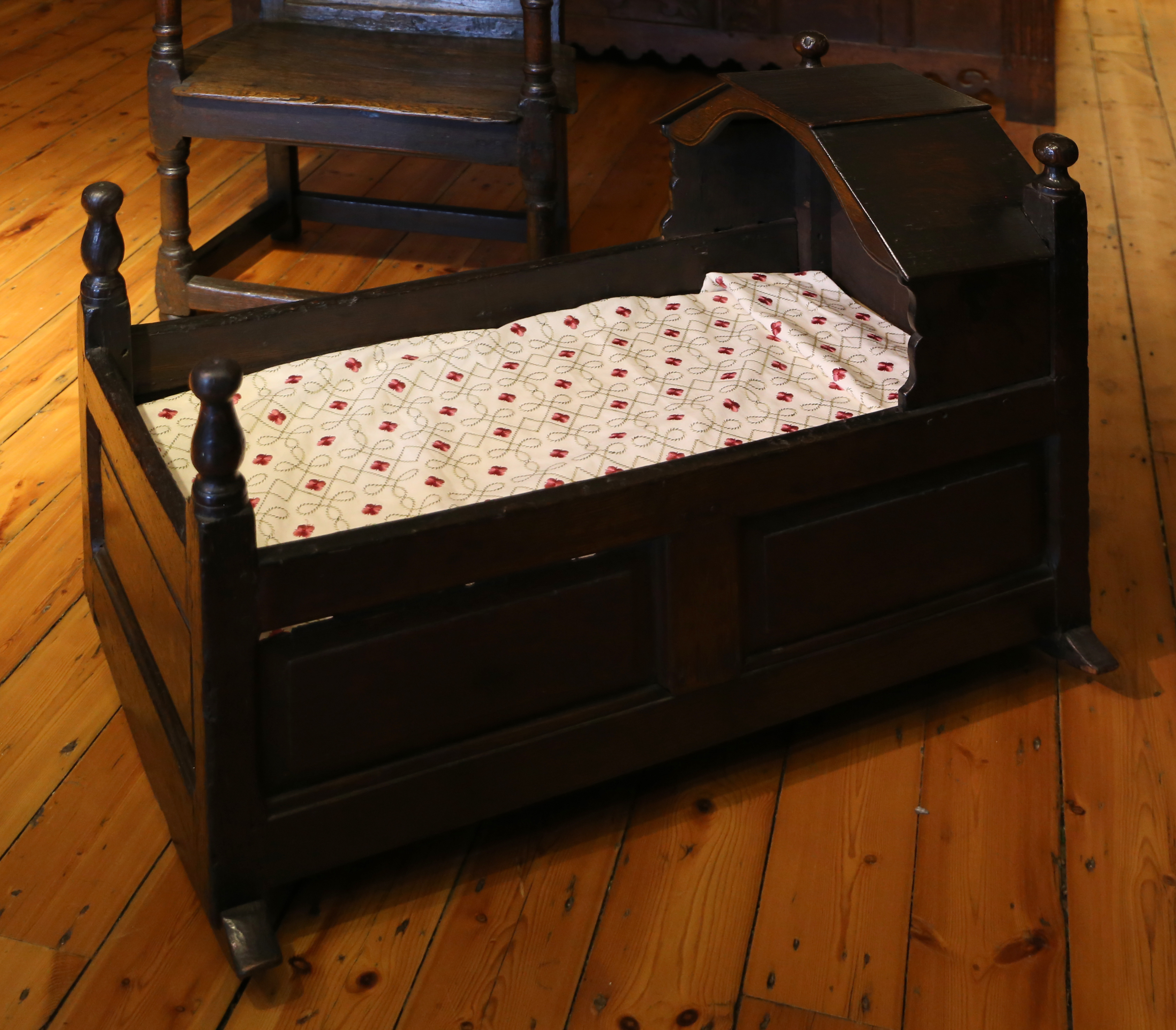
An Irish oak cradle, from circa 1690, displayed in the National Museum of Ireland

Earliest cradles were formed from hollowing out a half log, later replaced by a simple box structure. A carbonized cradle was found in the remains of Herculaneum left from the destruction of the city by the eruption of Mount Vesuvius in 79 CE. The Nahua or Aztec people used cradles, with an Aztec ceramic figure of a child in a cradle dated back to between 1350 and 1521 CE.

In most countries, cradles were commonly made of light wood or wicker, with the babies of royal or wealthy families slept in cradles decorated with precious stones, gold and silver from the medieval period on. Cradles continued to be designed to reflect design fashions, including the Renaissance, Baroque, and Art Nouveau.

In Ireland, low, hooded cradles were common, and could have evolved from more primitive cradles that were made from a dug out tree trunk and later woven ones.These low, box shaped cradles with a hood were more common in Ireland than suspended rocking cradles which were popular throughout Europe from the 1700s. It was believed that getting a secondhand cradle for a first born baby was lucky, and that it was preferable to give away a cradle rather than buy it. The hooded cradle was also common in early colonist settlers in North America.

In Hungary, babies slept in a cradle after their christening, sleeping with their mothers up to this point.

Examples of adult cradles also exist from the 18th and 19th centuries, and are presumed to have been used for elderly or infirm patients.
