= Co-sleeping =

Babies and young children sleeping near parents

Co-sleeping or bed sharing is a practice in which babies and young children sleep close to one or both parents, as opposed to in a separate room. Co-sleeping individuals sleep in sensory proximity to one another, where the individual senses the presence of others. This sensory proximity can either be triggered by touch, smell, taste, or noise. Therefore, the individuals can be a few centimeters away or on the other side of the room and still have an effect on the other. It is standard practice in many parts of the world, and is practiced by a significant minority in countries where cribs are also used.

Bed-sharing, a practice in which babies and young children sleep in the same bed with one or both parents, is a subset of co-sleeping. Co-bedding refers to infants (typically twins or higher-order multiples) sharing the same bed.

Whether cosleeping or using another sleep surface, it is considered important for the baby to be in the same room as an adult, committed caregiver for all sleeps—day and night—in early life. This is known to reduce the risk of SIDS by 50 per cent. Some organizations such as Red Nose Australia recommend this for the first 12 months of life and others such as the NHS recommend it for the first 6 months.

== Introduction ==
Bed-sharing among married couples is standard practice in many parts of the world outside of North America, Europe and Australia, and even in the latter areas a significant minority of children have shared a bed with their parents at some point in childhood. One 2006 study of children age 3–10 in India reported 93% of children bed-sharing while a 2006 study of children in Kentucky in the United States reported 15% of infants and toddlers 2 weeks to 2 years engage in bed-sharing.

Bed-sharing was widely practiced in all areas up to the 19th century, until the advent of giving the child his or her own room and the crib. In many parts of the world, bed-sharing simply has the practical benefit of keeping the child warm at night. Bed-sharing has been relatively recently re-introduced into Western culture by practitioners of attachment parenting. Proponents hold that bed-sharing saves babies' lives (especially in conjunction with nursing), promotes bonding, enables the parents to get more sleep and facilitates breastfeeding. Older babies can breastfeed during the night without waking their mother. Opponents argue that co-sleeping is stressful for the child when they are not co-sleeping. They also cite concerns that a parent may smother the child or promote an unhealthy dependence of the child on the parent(s).

Because children become accustomed to behaviors learned in early experiences, bed-sharing in infancy will also increase the likelihood of these children to crawl into their parent's bed in ages past infancy.

== Health and safety ==
Health care professionals disagree about bed-sharing techniques, effectiveness, and ethics. However, safe co-sleeping and bedsharing guidelines can be found on Lullaby Trust, where as organisations such as UNICEF outline the primary factors leading to hazardous cosleeping.

Traditional and cultural bedsharing and caregiving practices have also been found to reduce risk of SIDS for certain populations. But this is found to be opposite in others, increasing deaths categorised within SUDI.

=== Known risks ===
There are certain dangerous behaviors that increase SIDS and should be avoided whether placing a baby in a crib or co-sleeping: infants should always sleep on their backs on a firm surface (not waterbeds, pillows, recliners, or couches), mattresses should intersect the bedframe tightly, there should be no stuffed animals or soft toys near the baby, blankets should be light, a baby's head should never be covered, and other SIDS risk factors should be avoided. In addition some parents pose threats to infants due to their behaviors and conditions, such as smoking or drinking heavily, taking drugs, a history of skin infections, obesity, or any other specific risk-increasing traits.

Co-sleeping also increases the risks of suffocation and strangulation. The soft quality of the mattresses, comforters, and pillows may suffocate the infants. Some experts, then, recommend that the bed should be firm, and should not be a waterbed or couch; and that heavy quilts, comforters, and pillows should not be used. Another common advice given to prevent suffocation is to keep a baby on its back, not its stomach. Parents who roll over during their sleep could inadvertently crush and/or suffocate their child, especially if they are heavy sleepers, over-tired or over-exhausted and/or obese. There is also the risk of the baby falling to a hard floor, or getting wedged between the bed and the wall or headboard. A proposed solution to these problems is the bedside bassinet, in which, rather than bed-sharing, the baby's bed is placed next to the parent's bed.

Another precaution recommended by experts is that young children should never sleep next to babies under nine months of age.

A 2008 report explored the relationship between ad hoc parental behaviors similar to traditional co-sleeping methodology, though the study's subjects typically utilized cribs and other paraphernalia counter to co-sleeping models. While babies who had been exposed to behaviors reminiscent of co-sleeping had significant problems with sleep later in life, the study concluded that the parental behaviors were a reaction to already-present sleep difficulties. Most relationships between parental behavior and sleeping trouble were not statistically significant when controlled for those preexisting conditions. Further, typical co-sleeping parental behavior, like maternal presence at onset of sleep, were found to be protective factors against sleep problems.

=== Association with sudden infant death syndrome (SIDS) ===
Co-sleeping can often be regarded as an unnecessary practice that can be associated with issues such as sudden infant death syndrome (SIDS). However, research shows that opinions vary in the association between SIDS and co-sleeping. The most controversial issue regarding SIDS is whether bed sharing is a main cause, and whether it should be avoided or encouraged.

Some research indicates that SIDS risk increases with co-sleeping, particularly bed-sharing; other research indicates that co-sleeping done in an "appropriate and safe" manner reduces SIDS risk. As an example of the latter, the Pacific Islands Families study, conducted in New Zealand, indicated that the adoption of safe bed-sharing and room-sharing practices were saving infant lives, and found no examples of an infant dying from SIDS.

=== Arguments in favor ===
One study reported mothers getting more sleep and breast-feeding by co-sleeping than other arrangements. Parents also experience less exhaustion with such ease in feeding and comforting their child by simply reaching over to the child. As a result, co-sleeping also increases the responsiveness of parents to their child's needs.

It has been argued that co-sleeping evolved over five million years, that it alters the infant's sleep experience and the number of maternal inspections of the infant, and that it provides a beginning point for considering possibly unconventional ways of helping reduce the risk of sudden infant death syndrome (SIDS).

Stress hormones are lower in mothers and babies who co-sleep, specifically the balance of the stress hormone cortisol, the control of which is essential for a baby's healthy growth. In studies with animals, infants who stayed close to their mothers had higher levels of growth hormones and enzymes necessary for brain and heart growth. Also, the physiology of co-sleeping babies is more stable, including more stable temperatures, more regular heart rhythms, and fewer long pauses in breathing than babies who sleep alone.

Besides physical developmental advantages, co-sleeping may also promote long-term emotional health. In long-term follow-up studies of infants who slept with their parents and those who slept alone, the children who co-slept were happier, less anxious, had higher self-esteem, were less likely to be afraid of sleep, had fewer behavioral problems, tended to be more comfortable with intimacy, and were generally more independent as adults.

=== Products for infants ===
There are several products that claim they can be used to facilitate safe co-sleeping with an infant however these claims are not evidence based:

- special-purpose bedside bassinets, sidecar sleepers and bedside sleepers, which attach directly to the side of an adult bed and are open to the parent's side, but have barriers on the other three sides.
- bed top co-sleeping products designed to prevent the baby from rolling off the adult bed and to absorb breastmilk and other nighttime leaks.
- side rails to prevent the child from rolling off the adult bed.
- co-sleeping infant enclosures which are placed directly in the adult bed.
- specially designed separate sleeping bags for parents and infants which prevent covers being inadvertently pulled over the baby's head.
- wahakura : A simple woven basket that allows babies to safely sleep in the same bed as parents.

== Prevalence ==
A study of a small population in Northeast England showed a variety of nighttime parenting strategies and that 65% of the sample had bed-shared, 95% of them having done so with both parents. The study reported that some of the parents found bedsharing effective, yet were covert in their practices, fearing disapproval of health professionals and relatives. A National Center for Health Statistics survey from 1991 to 1999 found that 25% of American families always, or almost always, slept with their baby in bed, 42% slept with their baby sometimes, and 32% never bed-shared with their baby.

== Factors ==
=== Socioeconomic factors ===
Initial assumptions on co-sleeping may place it in a context of income and socioeconomic status. Generally, families of low socioeconomic status will be unable to afford a separate room for a child while those of high socioeconomic status can more easily afford a home with a sufficient number of rooms. However, statistical data shows the prevalence of co-sleeping in wealthy Japanese families and the ability of poor Western families to still find a separate space for their child, suggests that the acceptance of co-sleeping is a result of culture.

=== Cultural factors ===
Several studies show that the prevalence of co-sleeping is a result of cultural preference. In a study of 19 nations, a trend emerged, depicting a widely accepted practice of co-sleeping in Asian, African, and Latin American countries, while European and North American countries rarely practiced it. This trend resulted mostly from the respective fears of parents: Asian, African, and Latin American parents worried about the separation between the parents and the child, while European and North American parents feared a lack of privacy for both the parents and the child.

== See also ==
- Infant bed
- Overlying
