= Neonatal isoerythrolysis =

Blood disorder in newborn kittens and foals

Neonatal isoerythrolysis (NI), also known as hemolytic icterus or hemolytic anemia, is a disease most commonly seen in kittens and foals, but has also been reported in puppies. It occurs when the mother has antibodies against the blood type of the newborn.

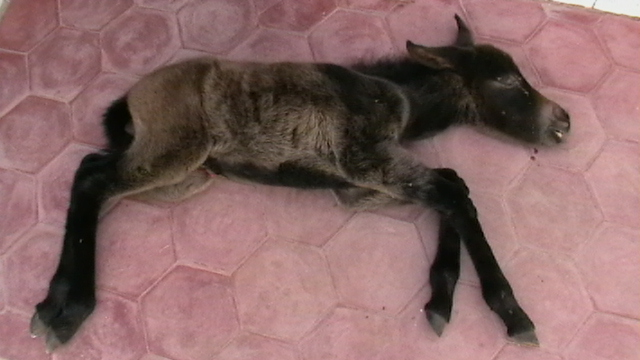
A 7 day old foal with neonatal isoerythrolysis.

== Neonatal isoerythrolysis in kittens ==
In cats, the antibodies are already present in the mother's blood before parturition. The blood group antigens are similar in structure to the antigen of a common bacteria in the gut of cats leading to antibody formation. Kittens obtain the majority of their immune response from the colostrum, and are not born with a strong immune response. When they absorb the mother's antibodies against their blood type it causes lysis of the red blood cells leading to anemia. Symptoms include lethargy, weakness, depression, pale mucous membranes, fever, and blood in the urine. Hypoxia may lead to forebrain disease, increased heart rate and respiratory rate, and liver or kidney disease. Animals suffering from this disease must be taken to a veterinarian immediately. Treatment includes fluid support and blood transfusions. The condition is most commonly seen in kittens with type-A blood born to mothers with type-B blood since type-B cats form very strong anti-type A antibodies. The condition is less common (and less severe) in type-B kittens born to type-A mothers.

It can be prevented by blood typing the mother and kittens. If there is a blood-type mismatch, the kittens should not be allowed to nurse for 72 hours from the mother to prevent the passage of antibodies in the colostrum. After that, the kittens can be allowed to nurse naturally.

== Neonatal isoerythrolysis in foals ==
Neonatal isoerythrolysis usually presents during the first 4 days of a foal's life, or 4-7 days in mule foals. It is a medical emergency and requires immediate veterinary attention to prevent further decline in health and subsequent death.

=== Pathophysiology ===
Neonatal isoerythrolysis occurs if a foal is born with a blood group that is different from its dam, and then receives antibodies against those red blood cells (alloantibodies) through the mare's colostrum, leading to the lysis of the foal's red blood cells. There are thus three requirements for this disease to occur:

1. The foal must inherit and express an antigen from the stallion's blood group that is not present in the mare.
2. The mare must have already produced alloantibodies against this antigen, which can only occur if she has been previously exposed to the incompatible red blood cells prior to birth of the foal.
3. The foal must ingest these alloantibodies through the colostrum of the mare when the gut is still "open" (able to absorb antibodies, the first 24 hours following birth).

The first scenario for the mare's exposure occurs if she is bred to a stallion of incompatible blood group, and during foaling receives the foal's red blood cells into her circulation due to transplacental hemorrhage. Because of the delay in production of antibody, this first foal is not at risk for isoerythrolysis since the mare will not have circulating antibodies until after colostrum production has ceased, meaning this foal will never have a chance for exposure. However, subsequent foals that are by the same stallion or a different stallion that carries the same incompatible blood group, are at risk, and as such this disease is most commonly seen in foals out of multiparous mares. Additionally, exposure can occur due to placental abnormalities in early gestation that allow the foal's red blood cells to leak into the mare's circulation, or if the mare is exposed through blood transfusion. Because this exposure occurs well before the foal receives colostrum, the mare will have circulating antibodies at the time of parturition and therefore the foal is at risk of developing NI.

During the final month of gestation, alloantibodies concentrate into the colostrum. Horses, unlike humans, have an epitheliochorial placenta which prevents the transfer of antibodies to the foal in-utero. Foals are only exposed when they first nurse and ingest colostrum, so therefore are born without the disease and acquire it soon after birth. After ingestion, these antibodies coat the red blood cells of the foal, leading to lysis through the complement system or removal by the mononuclear phagocyte system, and causing subsequent anemia.

=== Blood groups associated with neonatal isoerythrolysis ===
Most blood groups do not produce a highly immunologic response when the mare is exposed from previous foals or through placental leakage of red blood cells. However, a few factors, such as Aa and Qa, do lead to a significant response and therefore account for the majority of cases of isoerythrolysis. Mares that are Aa- and Qa-negative are therefore most likely to produce a foal with this condition. This is most commonly seen in Thoroughbreds (19%) and Arabians. Additionally, mule foals are especially at risk due to an associated donkey factor. Immune mediated thrombocytopenia often occurs concurrently in mule foals suffering from neonatal isoerythrolysis.

Some mares have natural alloantibodies, usually to the Ca blood group, without ever having a known exposure to that blood group. This is seen in 10% of Thoroughbred mares and 20% of Standardbred mares. In this case, Ca alloantibodies are thought to actually suppress a response against Aa blood groups, and therefore these mares do not make Aa alloantibodies if the foal has both Ca positive and Aa positive blood. These natural alloantibodies have not been shown to produce isoerythrolysis in foals, and are actually thought to help prevent NI by desensitization of the immune system and preventing the more harmful Aa alloantibodies from forming.

Alloantibodies against De, Ua, Pa, and Ab blood groups have also been associated with neonatal isoerythrolysis.

=== Clinical signs and testing ===
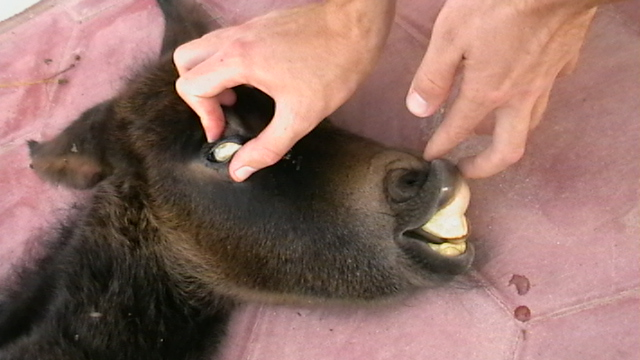
Icteric mucous membranes seen in a mule foal with NI.

Foals present normally at birth, but over the following 12–72 hours weaken, become depressed, and have a decreased suckle response. Signs typical of hemolytic anemia occur, including tachycardia (increased heart rate), tachypnea (increased respiratory rate), dyspnea, pale mucosa which becomes icteric by 24–48 hours of age, and occasionally hemoglobinuria. In more severe cases, seizures may occur secondary to cerebral hypoxia. Laboratory findings will show a decreased packed cell volume (PCV) that is usually less than 20%, an increased bilirubin, especially unconjugated bilirubin, and occult blood in the urine.

A definitive diagnosis can only be made if alloantibodies are discovered in the mare's serum or colostrum and are shown to be against the foal's red blood cells. Such tests include crossmatching the mare's serum to washed red blood cells of the foal, which is added to exogenous complement, and is positive if hemolysis occurs. A direct Coombs test may also be used, but does have a high rate of false negatives. Crossmatching using saline agglutination does run the risk of false negatives, since some alloantibodies only produce lysis rather than agglutination. Currently, screening tests of colostrum for use in the field have not been found to be accurate.

The severity of clinical signs and their speed of onset is determined by the dose of alloantibodies taken in by the foal and their potency. Alloantibodies against the Aa blood group are especially potent, and usually produce more severe signs than other alloantibodies when an equivalent dose is absorbed. Mares with multiple exposures to a blood group antigen also produce a greater amount of alloantibodies and therefore the foal receives a larger dose.

=== Treatment and prognosis ===
If diagnosed prior to time of gut closure (foal is less than 24 hours of age), the foal should be given an alternative nutrient source via nasogastric tube. The mare should be stripped of milk and the foal muzzled during the time to prevent additional ingestion of colostrum. However, this disease is usually diagnosed in foals greater than 24 hours of age, in which case the foal is safe to continue to ingest the mother's milk. Foals are supported with fluids, which are used to maintain hydration, correct electrolyte and acid-base imbalances, and help perfuse the stressed kidneys which can be damaged by the circulating hemoglobin. Foals are kept warm and as quiet as possible, and exercise is limited. Intranasal oxygen may be used to improve blood oxygen levels. Antimicrobials are also sometimes given to help prevent sepsis, which is more likely to occur in a compromised foal.

Blood transfusion is indicated if PCV drops below 12%,. The mare's blood may be used for transfusion if the red blood cells are washed multiple times to remove the serum component containing antibodies. If the mare can not be used, an alternative donor that is Aa and Qa negative may be used. This donor profile is most commonly seen in Quarter Horses, Morgans, and Standardbreds and is less likely in Thoroughbreds and Arabians, but ideally the donor should be blood typed prior to use rather than using breed as the sole method of identification. In mule foals, female donors that have been previously bred to a jack should not be used. Transfusion usually consists of 2-4 L of blood, or 1-2 L of packed cells, over the course of 2–4 hours. Blood transfusion is not without risks: these cells stress the mononuclear phagocytic system, increasing the foal's risk of infection, and also may lead to future transfusion reactions, so transfusion should only occur if required to save the animal's life. In the rare case where a suitable donor is not available or hemoglobin levels drop below 5 mg/dl, polymerized bovine hemoglobin may be given. PCV declines 4–7 days after initial transfusion. Dexamethasone is also sometimes used, but can affect blood glucose regulation of the patient.

Prognosis depends on the amount of alloantibody received and their potency, which may be indirectly measured by the degree of clinical signs. Some cases may result in a dead foal before diagnosis can be made. If there is slow onset of signs, supportive care often is enough to keep the foal alive.

=== Prevention ===
After producing a foal with NI, a mare is more likely to do so again. In this case, all subsequent foals should be given an alternative source of colostrum unless the mare is blood typed and bred to a compatible stallion. In breeds most commonly associated with this disease, such as Thoroughbreds and Arabians, compatible stallions that fit with the goals of the breeder's program may be difficult to find. If a non-compatible stallion is used, the mare's serum should be tested for alloantibodies in the final month of gestation. Those with alloantibodies should be stripped of colostrum at the time of parturition, and foals should be given an alternative source. Mares with alloantibodies to the Ca blood group are not at risk for producing neonatal isoerythrolysis in foals, and may be at decreased risk for NI in their foals (see above), so do not need an alternative colostrum source provided to their foals if the foal is Ca positive. Blood groups that have been associated with NI, such as Ab, De, Ua, and Pa, are generally not used in risk assessment of mares.

== See also ==
- Blood type (non-human)
- Fading puppy syndrome
- Hemolytic disease of the newborn
- Rh disease
- SIDS
