= Rooming-in =

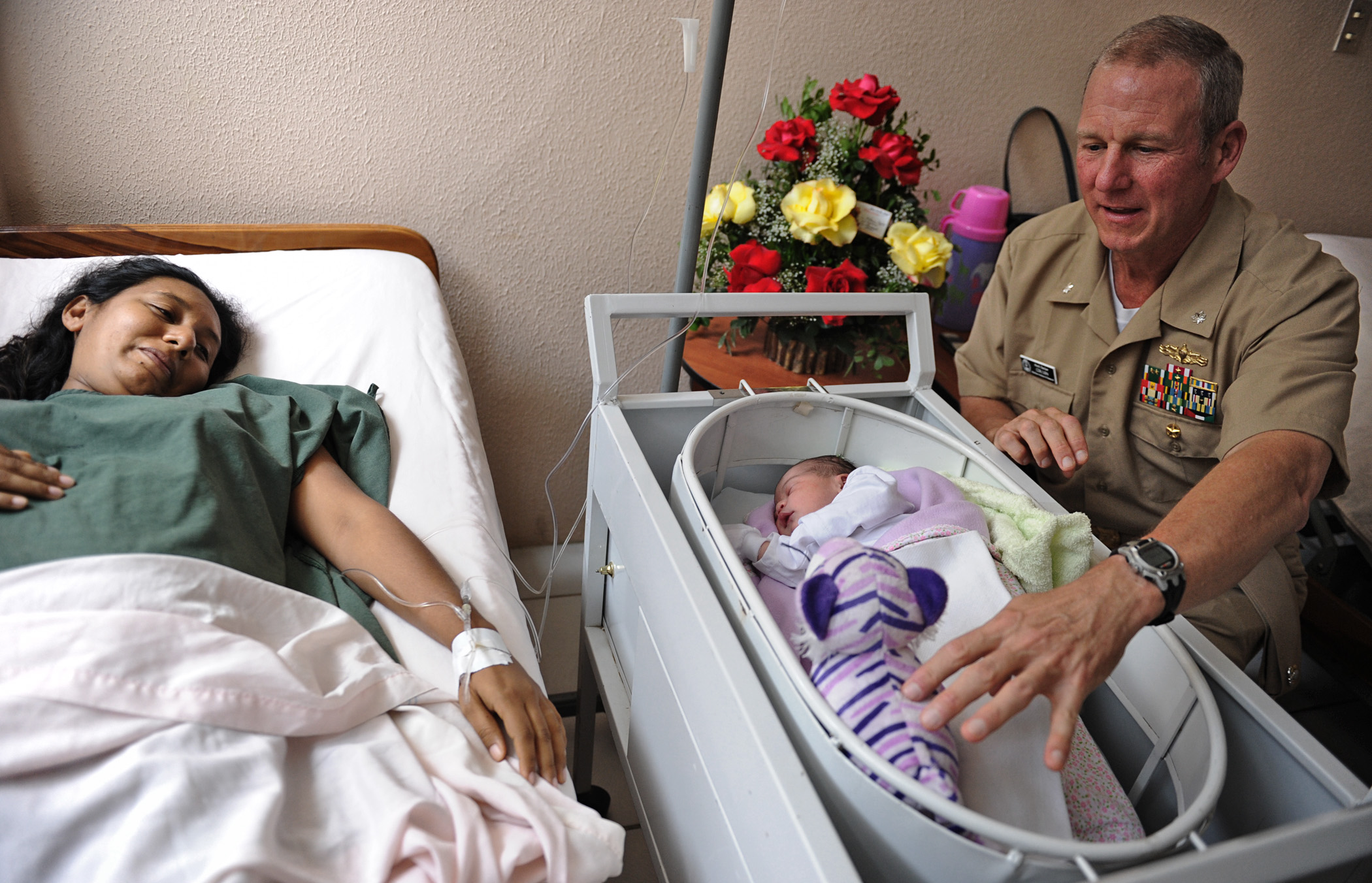
U.S. Navy Cmdr. Mark Becker, right, the mission commander of Southern Partnership Station 2011, presents an Ecuadorian newborn with a stuffed animal during tour of Clinica Fae in Ecuador Jan. 6, 2011. Stuffed animals were delivered as part of Project

Rooming-in is the practice followed in hospitals and maternity ward where the baby's crib is kept by the side of the mother's bed. This arrangement gives an opportunity for the parents to know their baby. The bond between the parent and the child is well established in roomed-in babies. There is a better chance of success with breast-feeding in roomed-in babies. Parents do not have the fear of baby-switching while roomed-in. Rooming-in is one of the components of baby-friendly hospitals, devised by WHO.

It is also used to refer to carers sharing the accommodation of elderly and dependent patients.
