= Toddler bed =

Bed designed for a young child

A toddler bed is a small bed designed for toddlers. A child grows capable of escaping an infant bed around one and a half or two years of age, at which they are often transitioned to a toddler bed. They become too large for a toddler bed between the ages of five and seven years, and will then transition to an ordinary bed.

Commonly toddler beds have low side rails (cot sides, possibly removable) on each side to prevent accidental rolling out of the bed while asleep, rather than being fully enclosed like an infant bed. A toddler bed is low to the ground to facilitate safe and easy entry and exit for the occupant. Due to their ground height, they are often referred to as floor beds or montessori beds. The mattress in a toddler bed is often the same size as that in an infant bed. Generally toddler beds range from 70 centimetres (28 in) x 140 centimetres (55 in) to 78 centimetres (31 in) x 180 centimetres (71 in). As toddlers are learning to express their tastes, licensed or themed beds to appeal to their preferences are available (for example, a racing car bed).

== See also ==
- Bassinet, a common precursor bed for newborns
