= Fading puppy syndrome =

Unhealthy young dogs

Fading puppy syndrome (or fading puppy complex) is when a puppy dies within the first few weeks of life without a clear cause of death or clinical signs, that is to say, they fail to thrive. Death usually occurs within the first five days of life, but can happen up to ten weeks of age. It is responsible for about 50% of deaths of newborn puppies.

Around 30% of pedigree puppies die in their first few weeks of life, with only about half of them dying due to identifiable causes.

== General ==
Like other species of mammals, canine puppies are very vulnerable during their first weeks of life, partly because they have no ability to regulate their own body temperature and their immune systems are not yet fully developed. It is estimated that the mortality rate is around 20–30% of live-born pedigree puppies in the first three weeks of life. Signs of the syndrome can include weakness, low body temperature, and "paddling".

== Contributing factors ==
Some of the more common possible causes of fading puppy syndrome are:

- Hypothermia and hyperthermia
- Lack of adequate care from the mother
- Congenital defects
- Low birth weight
- Infection or disease

After birth, the majority of the puppy's immune system is gained through the colostrum, or first milk. If the puppy is unable to nurse sufficiently of this milk, they may be more susceptible to infection.

Among the bacteria associated with the syndrome are Streptococcus agalactiae and Streptococcus canis. It is also associated with the parasite Toxocara canis and the viruses Canine herpesvirus and Canine parvovirus. In 2012, Tony Blundon concluded in In Practice that fading puppy syndrome occurs in puppies "that would otherwise be expected to survive but instead enter a period of rapid decline soon after birth". There is generally no established cause of death.

== Mitigating the risks of fading puppy syndrome ==
During their first few weeks of life, puppies are unable to regulate their own body temperature, and require a source of heat to stay warm. Due to their lack of an independent immune system, strict hygiene is beneficial, as is examining the mother for disease, such as mastitis or metritis, and viral infections such as Canine parvovirus or adenovirus. If the puppy is unable to nurse independently, supplemental colostrum replacement may help, as well as antibiotics in the case of bacterial sepsis.

== See also ==
- Neonatal isoerythrolysis
- Sudden infant death syndrome, a similar phenomenon in humans
