= Cot side =

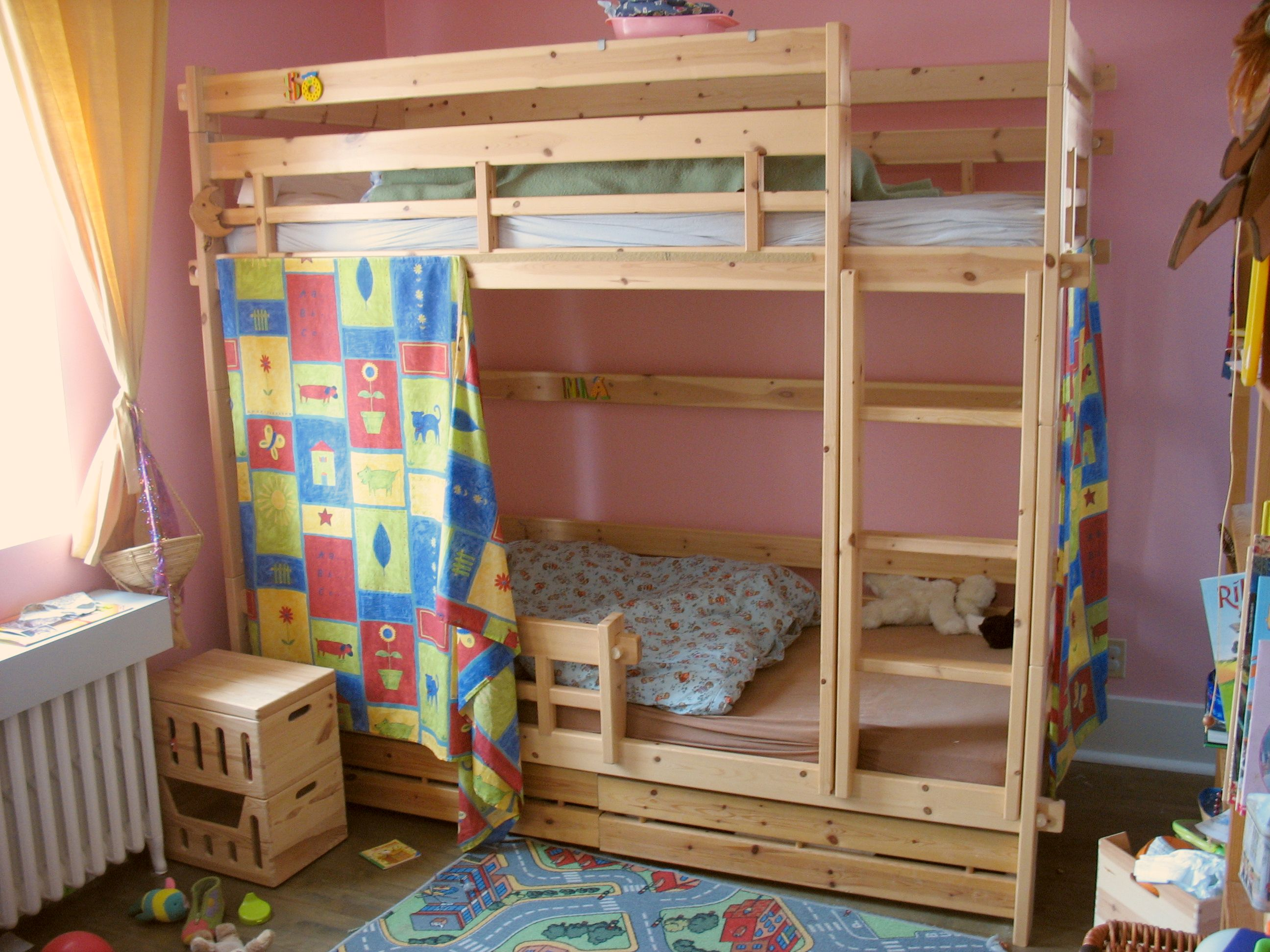
Bunk bed with the upper bunk protected by a bed guard rail

A cot side or bed guard rail is a raised side fitted to a bed to stop the occupant from falling out of bed.

Bed rails may occur in various kinds of bedding arrangements, including in toddler beds; however in infant beds the sides are to prevent intentional, rather than accidental, exit. They can also be used on ordinary beds, where the occupant, due to age or infirmity, is at risk for falling. Detachable bed rails are a common feature of hospital beds. Beds on boats that may roll in heavy weather may have fixed bed rails to protect the beds' occupants, and the upper bunk on bunkbeds often has a rail to protect occupants of both bunks.

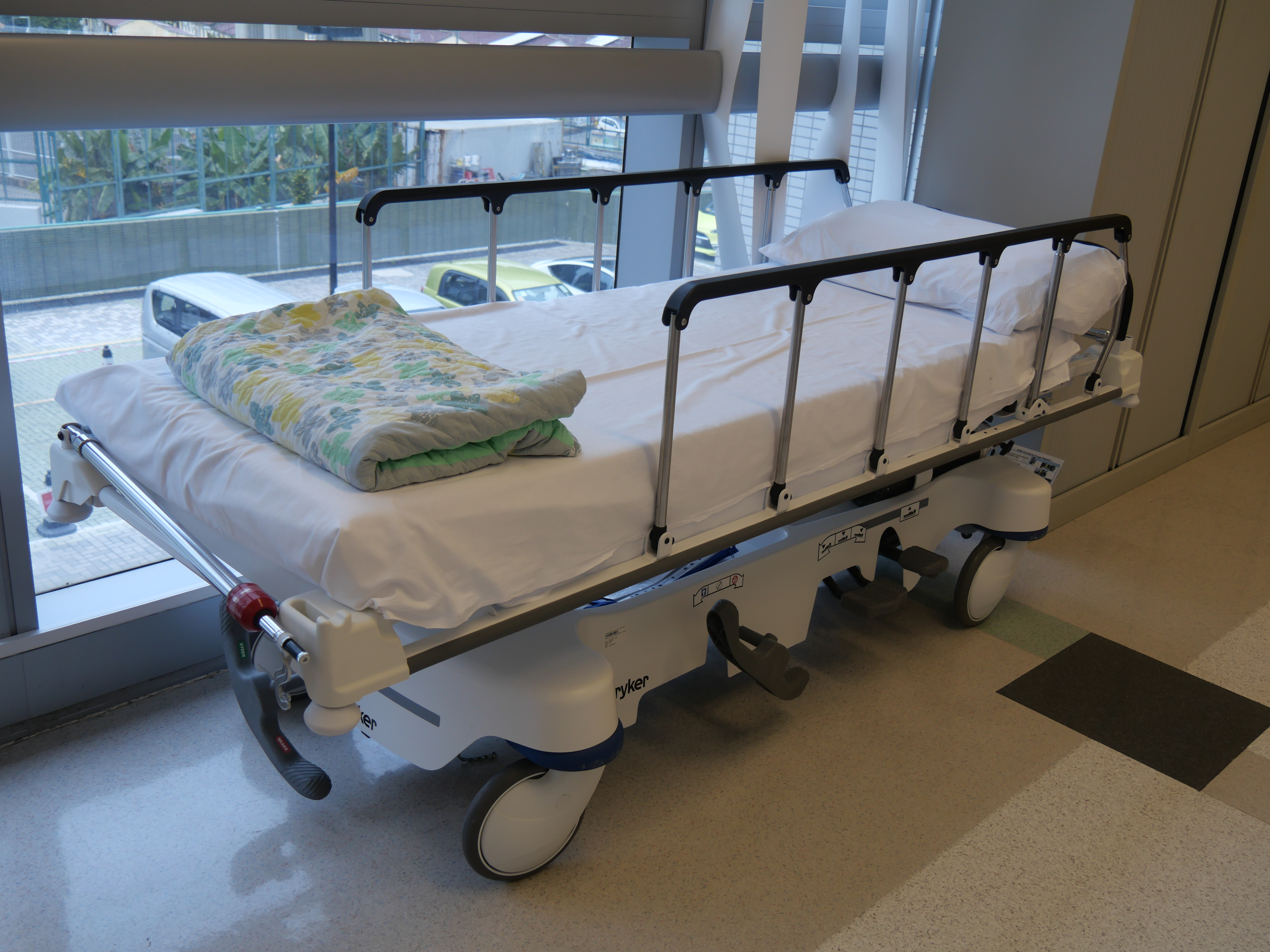
A hospital bed with guard rails, in Pok Oi Hospital, Hong Kong

Although they are considered a safety measure, bed rails are not the safest choice in some contexts. For example, routine use of bed rails may increase risks of injuries in nursing homes, where confused or defiant occupants may try to climb past them, and occupants with limited mobility may get trapped against or within the structure of rail.
