= Overlaying =

Accidental cause of death in small children

Overlaying or overlying is the act of accidentally smothering a child (less than 5 months of age but may occur in children up to the age of 2 years) to death by rolling over them during sleep.

Athelstan Braxton Hicks, the Deputy Coroner for London and Surrey, noted in 1889 that "during the last ten months no less than 500 cases had occurred in which children had been suffocated while in bed with their parents, in London alone." He estimated that a third of the allegedly accidental deaths of children were due to suffocations. Overcrowded conditions often led to overlaying and in another case he noted "it was no use reading the father a lesson on sleeping in a crowded room, for he was hard-up and could not pay for large apartments. The jury returned a verdict of 'Accidental death,' and expressed its opinion that the father had done the best he could in the circumstances."

In researching smothering deaths by black slaves in the American South, which occurred nine times more frequently than in white families; Michael P. Johnson suggests that sudden infant death syndrome was in fact to blame (which, if it happened in white families, would be heavily under-reported because of the social stigma attached).
