= Blood type (non-human) =

Phenotypic grouping based on red blood cell surface antigens

Animal erythrocytes have cell surface antigens that undergo polymorphism and give rise to blood types. Antigens from the human ABO blood group system are also found in apes and Old World monkeys, and the types trace back to the origin of anthropoids. Other animal blood sometimes agglutinates (to varying levels of intensity) with human blood group reagents, but the structure of the blood group antigens in animals is not always identical to those typically found in humans. The classification of most animal blood groups therefore uses different blood typing systems to those used for classification of human blood.

== Simian blood groups ==
Two categories of blood groups, human-type and simian-type, have been found in apes and monkeys, and they can be tested by methods established for grouping human blood. Data is available on blood groups of common chimpanzees, baboons, and macaques.

=== Rh blood group ===
The Rh system is named after the rhesus monkey, following experiments by Karl Landsteiner and Alexander S. Wiener, which showed that rabbits, when immunised with rhesus monkey red cells, produce an antibody that also agglutinates the red blood cells of many humans.

=== Chimpanzee and Old World monkey blood group systems ===
Two complex chimpanzee blood group systems, V-A-B-D and R-C-E-F systems, proved to be counterparts of the human MNS and Rh blood group systems, respectively. Two blood group systems have been defined in Old World monkeys: the Drh system of macaques and the Bp system of baboons, both linked by at least one species shared by either of the blood group systems.

== Canine blood groups ==
Over 13 canine blood groups have been described. Eight DEA (dog erythrocyte antigen) types are recognized as international standards. Of these DEA types, DEA 4 and DEA 6 appear on the red blood cells of ~98% of dogs. Dogs with only DEA 4 or DEA 6 can thus serve as blood donors for the majority of the canine population. Any of these DEA types may stimulate an immune response in a recipient of a blood transfusion, but reactions to DEA 1.1+ are the most severe.

Dogs that are DEA 1.1 positive (33 to 45% of the population) are universal recipients - that is, they can receive blood of any type without expectation of a life-threatening hemolytic transfusion reaction. Dogs that are DEA 1.1 negative are universal donors. Blood from DEA 1.1 positive dogs should never be transfused into DEA 1.1 negative dogs. If it is the dog's first transfusion the red cells transfused will have a shortened life due to the formation of alloantibodies to the cells themselves and the animal will forever be sensitized to DEA 1.1 positive blood. If it is a second such transfusion, life-threatening conditions will follow within hours. In addition, these alloantibodies will be present in a female dog's milk (colostrum) and adversely affect the health of DEA 1.1 negative puppies.

Other than DEA blood types, Dal is another blood type commonly known in dogs.

== Feline blood groups ==
A majority of feline blood types are covered by the AB blood group, which designates cats as A, B, or AB. This type is determined by the CMAH alleles a cat possesses. The majority A allele seems to be dominant over the recessive B type, which is found with a higher frequency in some countries other than the United States. An "AB" type seems to be expressed by a third recessive allele. In a study conducted in England, 87.1% of non-pedigree cats were type A, while only 54.6% of pedigree cats were type A. Type A and B cats have naturally occurring alloantibodies to the opposite blood type, although the reaction of Type B cats to Type A blood is more severe than vice versa. Based on this, all cats should have a simple blood typing test done to determine their blood type prior to a transfusion or breeding to avoid haemolytic disease or neonatal isoerythrolysis.

An additional blood group system is Mik (+/-). It is only identified in 2007, with no specific gene mapped yet, but the prevalence of Mik- appears high enough for concern.

== Equine blood groups ==
Horses have eight blood groups, of which seven, A, C, D, K, P, Q, and U, are internationally recognized, while the eighth, T, is primarily used in research. Each blood group has at least two allelic factors (for example, the A blood group has a, b, c, d, e, f, and g), which can be combined in all combinations (Aa, Afg, Abedg, etc.), to make many different alleles. This means that horses can have around 400,000 allelic combinations, allowing blood testing to be used as an accurate method of identifying a horse or determining parentage. Unlike humans, horses do not naturally produce antibodies against red blood cell antigens that they do not possess; this only occurs if they are somehow exposed to a different blood type, such as through blood transfusion or transplacental hemorrhage during parturition.

Breeding a mare to a stallion with a different blood type, usually Aa or Qa blood, risks neonatal isoerythrolysis if the foal inherits the blood type of the stallion. Group C is also of some degree of concern. This can also occur if a mare is bred to a jack, due to a "donkey factor". This immune-mediated disease is life-threatening and often requires transfusion.

Ideally, cross-matching should be performed prior to transfusion, or a universal donor may be used. The ideal universal whole blood donor is a non-thoroughbred gelding that is Aa, Ca, and Qa negative. If this is not available, a gelding, preferably of the same breed as the patient, may be used as a donor, and cross-matching may be crudely accessed by mixing donor serum with patient blood. If the mixture agglutinates, the donor blood contains antibodies against the blood of the patient, and should not be used.

== Bovid blood groups ==
The polymorphic systems in cattle include the A, B, C, F, J, L, M, S, and Z polymorphisms.

Sheep blood types are A, B, C, D, M, R and X. The B system is highly polymorphic. The R system is soluble. The M-L system is involved in active red cell potassium transport and polymorphisms.

In goats there are A, B, C, M and J, similar to sheep.

== Birds ==
In parrots, notably, there are no reported blood types, but there is a better success rate of transfusion between same species of animal.

In chickens, the blood groups are A, B, C, D, E, H, I, J, K, L, N, P, and R.
