= Bassinet =

Type of bed for the youngest infants

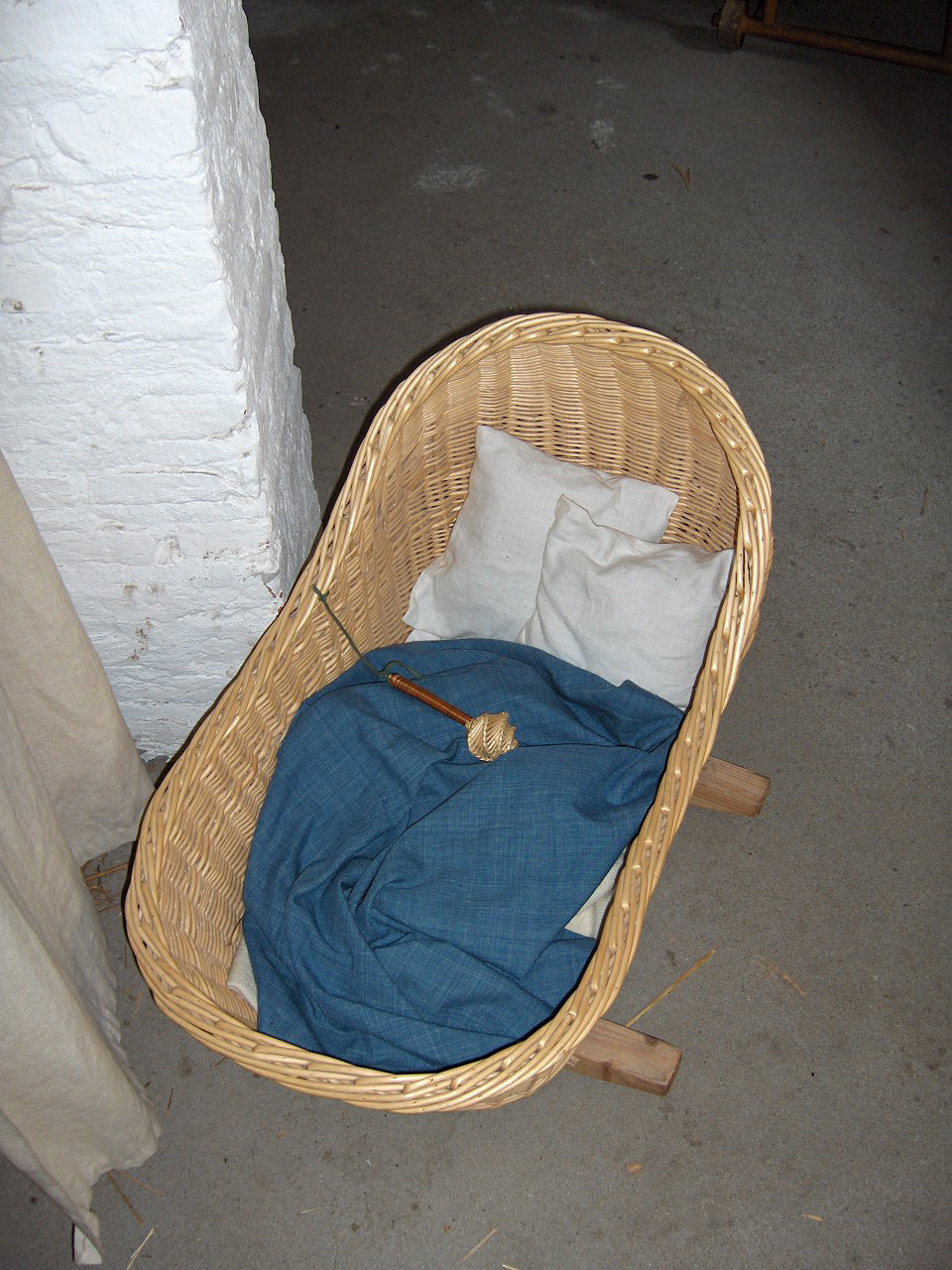
Modern reproduction of a medieval cot and rattle, c. 1465

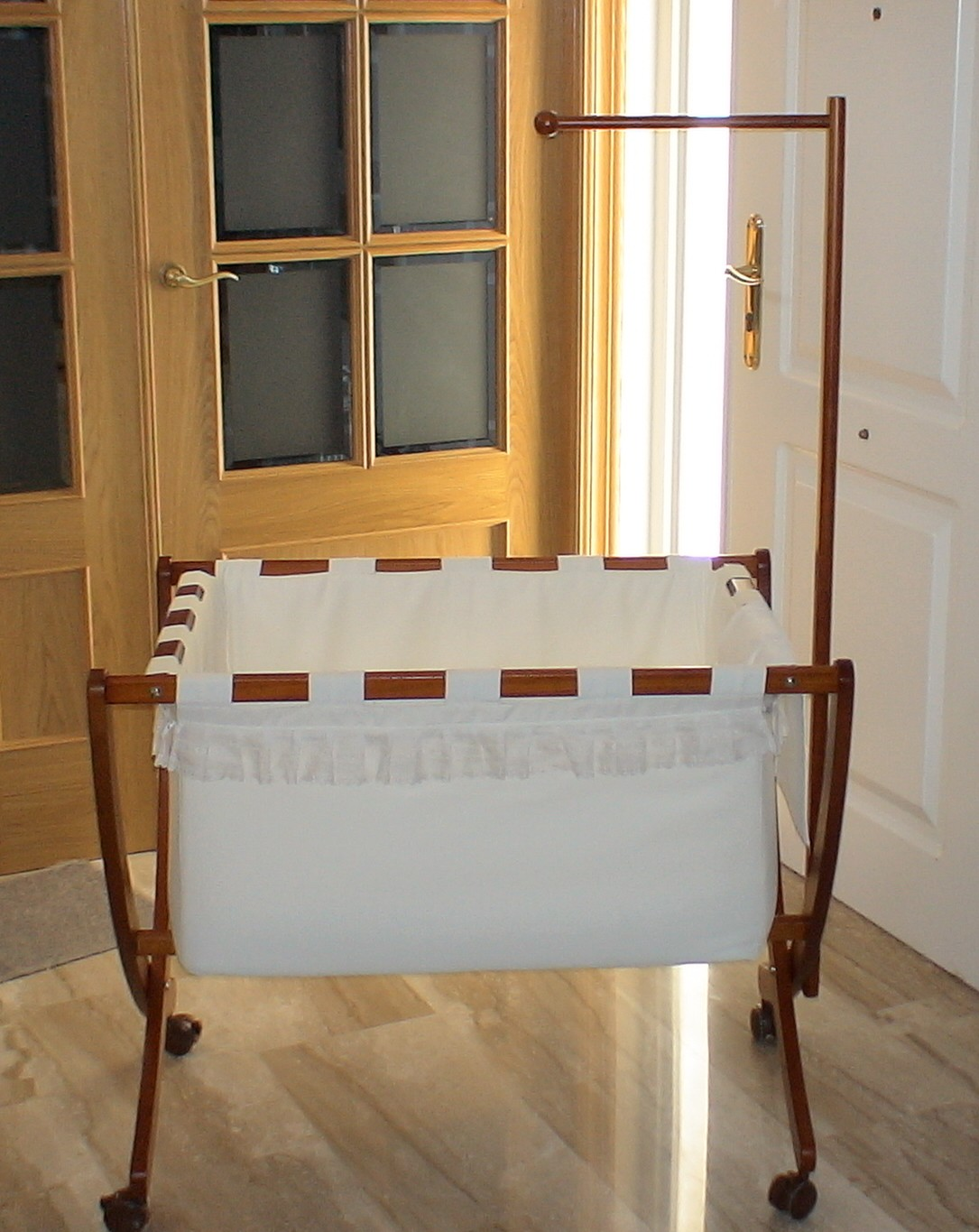
Movable, but not portable, home bassinet

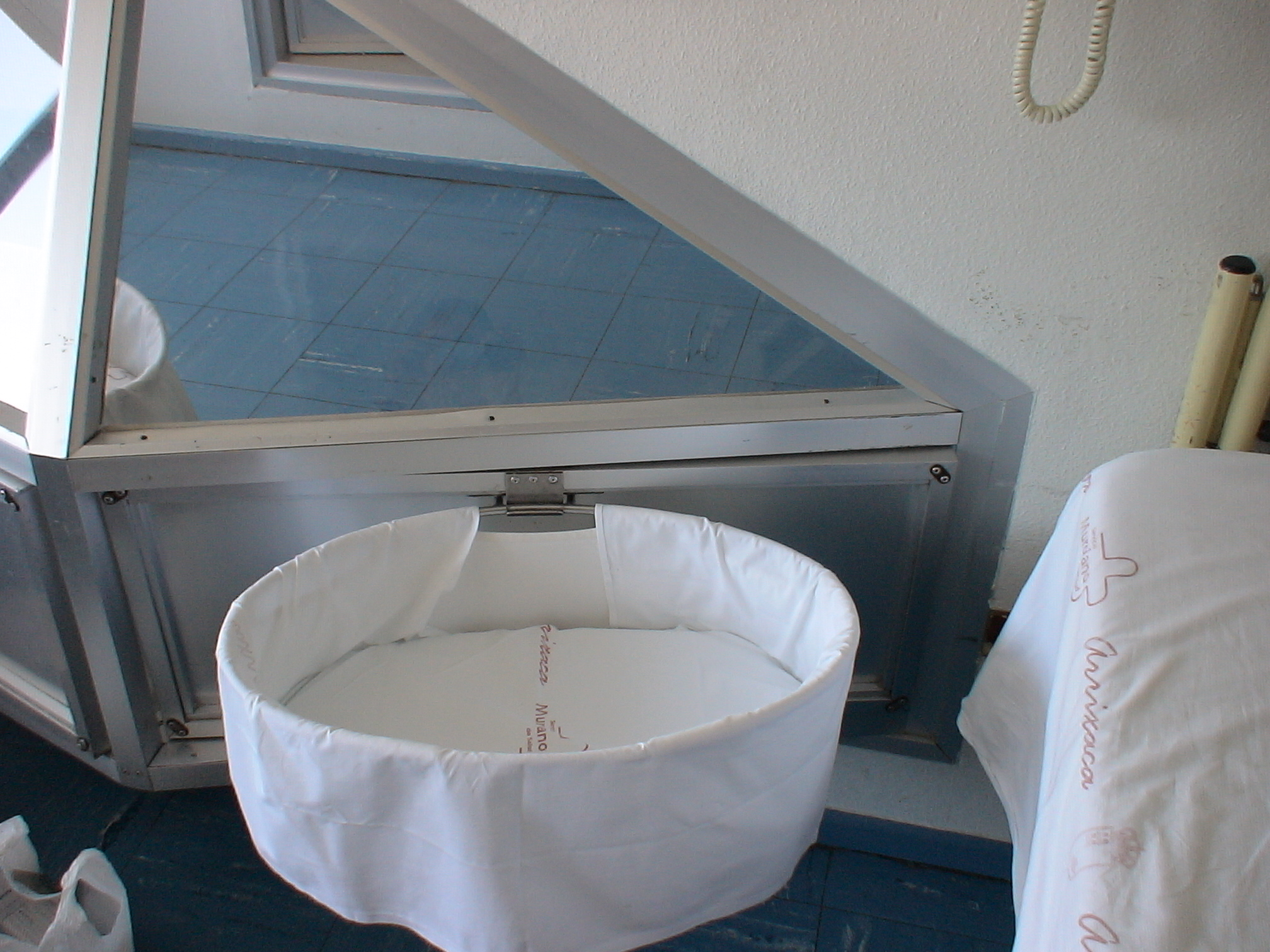
Rooming-in bassinet

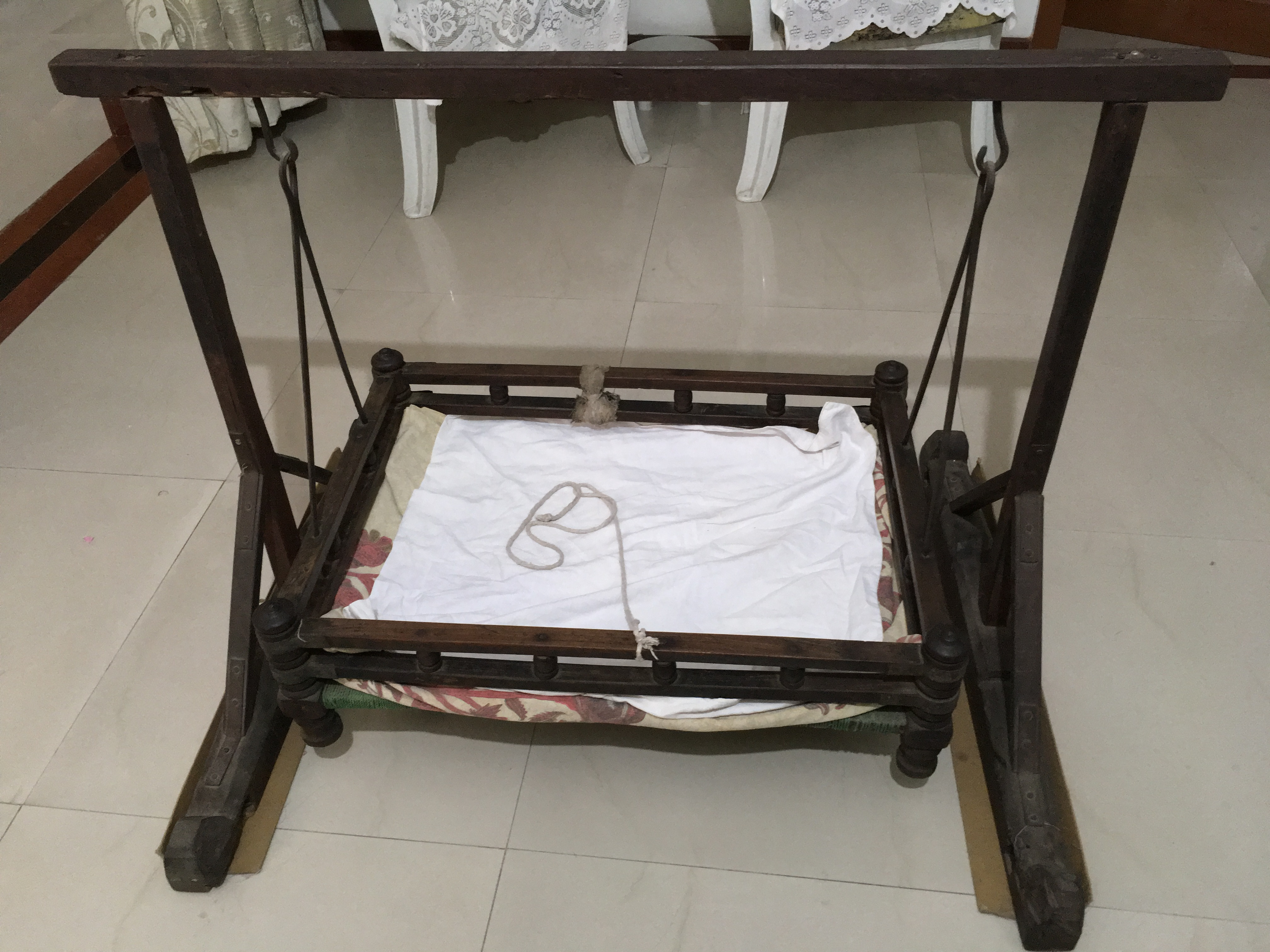
A wooden cradle from India

A bassinet, bassinette, or cradle is a bed specifically for babies from birth to about four months. Bassinets are generally designed to work with fixed legs or caster wheels, while cradles are generally designed to provide a rocking or gliding motion. Bassinets and cradles are distinguished from Moses baskets and carry cots, which are designed to be carried and sit directly on the floor or furniture. After four months, babies are often transferred to a crib (American usage) or cot (UK usage). In the United States, however, the bedside sleeper is the prevalent option, since they are generally bigger, recommended up to 6 months, and often used up to a year.

== Design ==
A bassinet is typically a basket-like structure on free-standing legs, often with casters. A cradle is typically set in a fixed frame, but with the ability to rock or glide.

== Use ==
Bassinet usage in the United States nearly doubled to 20% from 1992 to 2006. Greater than 45% of babies up to two months used a bassinet. By 5–6 months, however, fewer than 10% of babies sleep in bassinets. In a hospital environment, a special form of sealed bassinet is used in a neonatal intensive care unit.

On many long-haul flights, most airlines provide a bassinet (which is attached to a bulkhead) to adults travelling with an infant, i.e., a child under the age of two. The use of the bassinet is restricted by the infant's size and weight. These need to be requested in advance with the airline. However, most USA and Canadian airlines have bassinet policies which mean they are only allocated at the airport gate.

Research has shown that the mattress influences SIDS outcomes; a firm mattress lowers SIDS risk.

Some bassinets are designed to rock or swing freely, with many carers finding their child calmed by this action. The process of lulling the child to sleep may be accompanied by prerecorded or live performance of lullabies.

== Stationary or portable ==
Although there are many variations, they fall generally into two categories:

- light and portable types sometimes called Moses baskets
- sturdier but less portable cradles

In both cases, they are generally designed to allow the resting baby to be carried from place to place. Within the home, they are often raised on a stand or other surface to reduce back strain when bending over to tend the baby. Wheeled frames to convert a bassinet into a pram or baby carriage are common.

== Smart bassinets ==
Bassinets that automatically soothe babies by sound and motion in response to crying recently have become available, starting with the Snoo in October 2016. The Snoo has been criticized for its high price. Graco, 4Moms, and other companies have introduced cheaper competing products.

== Rolling ==
At three or four months of age babies are able to roll over by themselves; this means they could tip the bassinet over, so for safety they must use an infant bed or toddler bed instead.

== See also ==
- Baby bedding
- Baby transport
