= SIDS =

Sudden unexplained death of a child who is less than one year of age

Sudden infant death syndrome
- Other names: Cot death; crib death
- The Safe to Sleep campaign encourages having infants sleep on their backs to reduce the risk of SIDS.
- Specialty: Pediatrics; Forensic pathology
- Usual onset: One to four months in age
- Causes: Unknown
- Risk factors: Sleeping on belly or side; Overheating; Exposure to tobacco smoke; Preterm birth
- Diagnostic method: Investigation; Autopsy
- Differential diagnosis: Infections; Genetic disorders; Heart problems
- Prevention: Sleeping supine; Pacifier use; Breastfeeding
- Frequency: 1 in 1,000–10,000

Sudden infant death syndrome (SIDS), sometimes known as cot death or crib death, is the sudden, unexplained death of a child of less than one year of age. Diagnosis requires that the death remain unexplained even after a thorough autopsy and detailed death scene investigation. SIDS usually occurs between the hours of midnight and 9:00 a.m., or when the baby is sleeping. There is usually no noise or evidence of struggle. SIDS remains one of the leading causes of infant mortality in Western countries, constituting almost 1/3 of all post-neonatal deaths.

The exact cause of SIDS is unknown. The requirement of a combination of factors including a specific underlying susceptibility, a specific time in development, and an environmental stressor has been proposed. These environmental stressors may include sleeping on the stomach or side, overheating, and exposure to tobacco smoke. Accidental suffocation from bed sharing (also known as co-sleeping) or soft objects may also play a role. Another risk factor is being born before 37 weeks of gestation. Between 1% and 5% of SIDS cases are estimated to be misidentified infanticides caused by intentional suffocation. SIDS makes up about 80% of sudden and unexpected infant deaths (SUIDs). The other 20% of cases are often caused by infections, genetic disorders, and heart problems.

The most effective method of reducing the risk of SIDS is putting a child less than one year old on their back to sleep. Other measures include a firm mattress separate from but close to caregivers, no loose bedding, a relatively cool sleeping environment, using a pacifier, and avoiding exposure to tobacco smoke. Breastfeeding and immunization may also be preventative. Measures not shown to be useful include positioning devices and baby monitors. Evidence is not sufficient for the use of fans. Grief support for families affected by SIDS is important, as the death of the infant is unexpected, unexplained, and can cause suspicion that the infant may have been intentionally harmed.

Rates of SIDS vary nearly tenfold in developed countries from one in a thousand to one in ten thousand. Globally, it resulted in about 19,200 deaths in 2015, down from 22,000 deaths in 1990. SIDS was the third leading cause of death in children less than one year old in the United States in 2011. It is the most common cause of death between one month and one year of age. About 90% of cases happen before six months of age, with it being most frequent between two months and four months of age. It is more common in boys than girls. Rates of SIDS have decreased by up to 80% in areas with "Safe to Sleep" campaigns.

== Definition ==
Video explanation

The syndrome applies only to infants under one year of age. SIDS is a diagnosis of exclusion and should be applied to only those cases in which an infant's death is sudden and unexpected, and remains unexplained after the performance of an adequate postmortem investigation, including:

1. an autopsy (by an experienced pediatric pathologist, if possible);
2. investigation of the death scene and circumstances of the death; and
3. exploration of the medical history of the infant and family.

After investigation, some of these infant deaths are found to be caused by suffocation, hyperthermia or hypothermia, neglect or some other defined cause.

Australia and New Zealand shifted to sudden unexpected death in infancy (SUDI) for professional, scientific, and coronial clarity:

The term SUDI is now often used instead of sudden infant death syndrome (SIDS) because some coroners prefer to use the term 'undetermined' for a death previously considered to be SIDS. This change is causing a diagnostic shift in the mortality data.

In addition, the US Centers for Disease Control and Prevention have proposed that such deaths be called sudden unexpected infant deaths (SUID) and that SIDS is a subset of SUID.

=== Age ===
SIDS has a four-parameter lognormal age distribution that spares infants shortly after birth—the time of maximal risk for almost all other causes of non-trauma infant death.

By definition, SIDS deaths occur under the age of one year, with the peak incidence occurring when the infant is two to four months old. This is considered a critical period because the infant's ability to rouse from sleep is not yet mature.

== Risk factors ==
The exact cause of SIDS is unknown. Although studies have identified risk factors for SIDS, such as putting infants to bed on their bellies, there has been little understanding of the syndrome's biological process or its potential causes. Deaths from SIDS are unlikely to be due to a single cause, but rather to multiple risk factors. The frequency of SIDS does appear to be influenced by social, economic, or cultural factors, such as maternal education, race or ethnicity, or poverty. SIDS is believed to occur when an infant with an underlying biological vulnerability, who is at a critical development age, is exposed to an external trigger. The following risk factors generally contribute either to the underlying biological vulnerability or represent an external trigger:

=== Tobacco smoke ===
SIDS rates are higher in babies of mothers who smoke during pregnancy. Between no smoking and smoking one cigarette a day, on average, the risk doubles. About 22% of SIDS in the United States is related to maternal smoking. SIDS correlates with levels of nicotine and its derivatives in the baby. Nicotine and derivatives cause alterations in neurodevelopment.

=== Sleeping ===
Placing an infant to sleep while lying on the belly or side rather than on the back increases the risk for SIDS. This increased risk is greatest at two to three months of age. Elevated or reduced room temperature also increases the risk, as does excessive bedding, clothing, soft sleep surfaces, and stuffed animals in the bed. Bumper pads may increase the risk of SIDS due to the risk of suffocation. They are not recommended for children under one year of age, as this risk of suffocation greatly outweighs the risk of head bumping or limbs getting stuck in the bars of the crib.

Sharing a bed with parents or siblings also increases the risk for SIDS. This risk is greatest in the first three months of life, when the mattress is soft, when one or more persons share the infant's bed, especially when the bed partners are using drugs or alcohol or are smoking. The risk remains, however, even in parents who do not smoke or use drugs. The American Academy of Pediatrics thus recommends "room-sharing without bed-sharing", stating that such an arrangement can decrease the risk of SIDS by up to 50%. Furthermore, the academy has recommended against devices marketed to make bed-sharing "safe", such as "in-bed co-sleepers".

Room sharing as opposed to solitary sleeping is known to decrease the risk of SIDS.

=== Breastfeeding ===
Breastfeeding is associated with a lower risk of SIDS. It is not clear if co-sleeping among mothers who breastfeed without any other risk factors increases SIDS risk.

=== Pregnancy and infant factors ===
SIDS rates decrease with increasing maternal age, with teenage mothers at greatest risk. Delayed or inadequate prenatal care also increases risk. Low birth weight is a significant risk factor. In the United States from 1995 to 1998, the SIDS death rate for infants weighing 1000–1499 g was 2.89/1000, while for a birth weight of 3500–3999 g, it was only 0.51/1000. Premature birth increases the risk of SIDS death roughly fourfold. From 1995 to 1998, the US SIDS rate for births at 37–39 weeks of gestation was 0.73/1000, while the SIDS rate for births at 28–31 weeks of gestation was 2.39/1000.

Anemia has also been linked to SIDS (however, per item 6 in the list of epidemiologic characteristics below, the extent of anemia cannot be evaluated at autopsy because an infant's total hemoglobin can only be measured during life). SIDS incidence rises from zero at birth, is highest from two to four months of age, and declines toward zero after the infant's first year.

=== Genetics ===
Genetics plays a role, as SIDS is more prevalent in males. There is a consistent 50% male excess in SIDS per 1000 live births of each sex. Given a 5% male excess birth rate, there appears to be 3.15 male SIDS cases per 2 female cases, for a male fraction of 0.61. This value of 61% in the US is an average of 57% black male SIDS, 62.2% white male SIDS, and 59.4% for all other races combined. Note that when multiracial parentage is involved, the infant's race is arbitrarily assigned to one category or the other; most often, it is chosen by the mother. The X-linkage hypothesis for SIDS and the male excess in infant mortality have shown that the 50% male excess might be related to a dominant X-linked allele, occurring with a frequency of 1/3 that is protective against transient cerebral anoxia. An unprotected male would occur with a frequency of 2/3 and an unprotected female would occur with a frequency of 4/9.

About 10 to 20% of SIDS cases are believed to be due to channelopathies, which are inherited defects in the ion channels that play an important role in the contraction of the heart.

Genetic evidence published in November 2020 concerning the case of Kathleen Folbigg, who was imprisoned for the death of her children, showed that at least two of the children had genetic mutations in the CALM2 gene that predisposed them to heart complications. Kathleen was pardoned 5 June 2023 after spending 20 years in jail.

=== Alcohol ===
Drinking of alcohol by parents is linked to SIDS. One study found a positive correlation between the two during New Year celebrations and weekends. Another found that alcohol use disorder was linked to a more than doubling of risk.

=== Other ===
A 2022 study found that infants who died of SIDS exhibited significantly lower specific activity of butyrylcholinesterase, an enzyme involved in the brain's arousal pathway, shortly after birth. This can serve as a biomarker to identify infants with a potential autonomic cholinergic dysfunction and elevated risk for SIDS.

SIDS has been linked to cold weather, with this association believed to be due to over-bundling and thus, overheating. Premature babies are at four times the risk of SIDS, possibly related to an underdeveloped ability to automatically control the cardiovascular system.

A 2-part edition of The Cook Report from 1994 claimed that antimony- and phosphorus-containing compounds used as fire retardants in PVC and other cot mattress materials were a cause of SIDS. Subsequent investigation by an Expert Panel led by Lady Limerick found that there was no evidence to support this claim. The report also states that toxic gas cannot be generated from antimony in mattresses and that babies had SIDS on mattresses that did not contain the compound.

It has been suggested that some cases of SIDS may be related to Staphylococcus aureus and Escherichia coli infections.

== Diagnosis ==
=== Differential diagnosis ===
Some conditions that are often undiagnosed and could be confused with or comorbid with SIDS include:

- medium-chain acyl-coenzyme A dehydrogenase deficiency (MCAD deficiency);
- infant botulism;
- long QT syndrome (accounting for less than 2% of cases);
- Helicobacter pylori bacterial infections;
- shaken baby syndrome and other forms of child abuse;
- overlaying, child smothering during carer's sleep

For example, an infant with MCAD deficiency might die by "classical SIDS" if found swaddled and prone, with its head covered, in an overheated room where parents were smoking. Genes indicating susceptibility to MCAD and Long QT syndrome do not protect an infant from dying of classical SIDS. Therefore, the presence of a susceptibility gene, such as for MCAD, means the infant might have died either from SIDS or from MCAD deficiency. It is currently impossible for a pathologist to distinguish between them.

A 2010 study looked at 554 autopsies of infants in North Carolina that listed SIDS as the cause of death and suggested that many of these deaths may have been due to accidental suffocation. The study found that 69% of autopsies listed other possible risk factors that could have led to death, such as unsafe bedding or sleeping with adults.

Several instances of infanticide have been uncovered in which the diagnosis was originally SIDS. Since an autopsy is often unable to determine whether asphyxiation is caused intentionally, medical practitioners rely on patient and family history and evidence of prior abuse to identify cases of infanticide. Some estimates in the 1980s and 1990s placed the potential rate of SIDS deaths caused by maltreatment around 10% and as high as 40%, but data from interventions such as the Safe to Sleep campaign suggest that these figures were substantially inflated. In 2006, the American Academy of Pediatrics estimated that between 1% and 5% of SIDS cases were potentially attributable to undiagnosed infanticide.

Some have underestimated the risk of two SIDS deaths occurring in the same family; the Royal Statistical Society issued a media release refuting expert testimony in one UK case, in which the conviction was subsequently overturned.

== Prevention ==
Several measures are effective in preventing SIDS, including changing the sleeping position to supine, breastfeeding, limiting soft bedding, immunizing the infant, and using pacifiers. The use of electronic monitors is not useful as a preventative strategy. The effect that fans might have on the risk of SIDS has not been studied well enough to make any recommendation about them. Evidence regarding swaddling is unclear regarding SIDS. A 2016 review found tentative evidence that swaddling increases the risk of SIDS, especially among babies placed on their bellies or sides while sleeping.

Measures not shown to be useful include positioning devices and baby monitors. In the United States, companies that sell the monitors do not have FDA approval for them as medical devices.

=== Sleep positioning ===
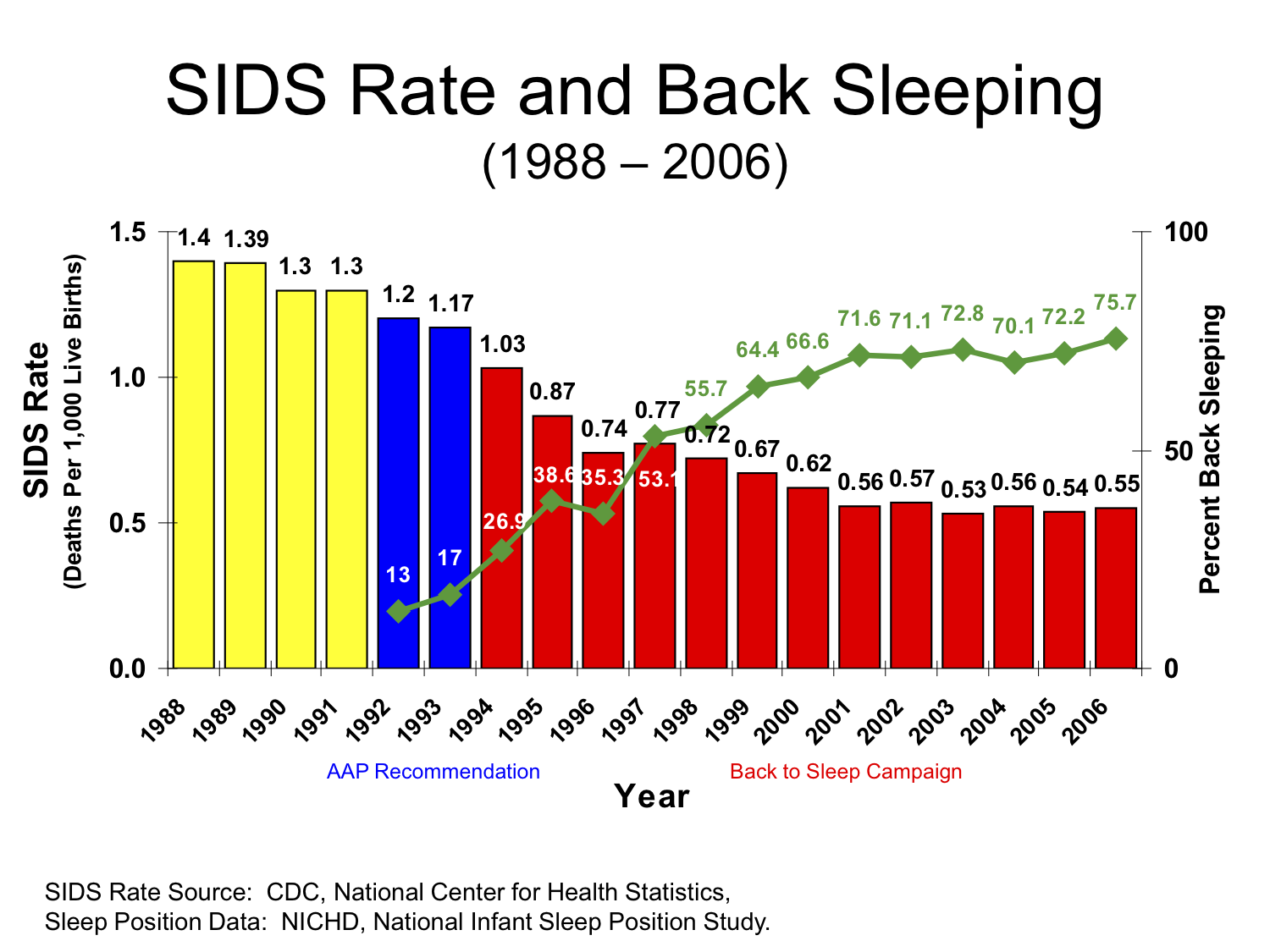
SIDS rate from 1988 to 2006 (US)

Sleeping on the back has been found to reduce the risk of SIDS. It is thus recommended by the American Academy of Pediatrics and promoted as a best practice by the US National Institute of Child Health and Human Development (NICHD) "Safe to Sleep" campaign. The incidence of SIDS has fallen in a number of countries in which this recommendation has been widely adopted. Sleeping on the back does not appear to increase the risk of choking, even in those with gastroesophageal reflux disease. While infants in this position may sleep more lightly, this is not harmful. Sharing the same room as the parents but in a different bed may decrease the SIDS risk by half.

So-called sleep positioners (baby pillows) do not promise success and can even increase the risk of sudden infant death syndrome (SIDS). Sleep positioners are supposed to prevent infants from rolling onto their stomachs while sleeping and thus assuming a position that increases the risk of SIDS. However, the US regulatory authority has been notified of twelve deaths in which infants suffocated in sleep positioners (as of 2010). There is currently no scientific evidence that the use of respiratory monitors reduces the incidence of SIDS.

=== Pacifiers ===
The use of pacifiers appears to decrease the risk of SIDS, although the reason is unclear. The American Academy of Pediatrics considers pacifier use to prevent SIDS to be reasonable. Pacifiers do not appear to affect breastfeeding in the first four months, even though this is a common misconception.

=== Bedding ===
Product safety experts advise against using pillows, overly soft mattresses, sleep positioners, bumper pads (crib bumpers), stuffed animals, or fluffy bedding in the crib, and recommend instead dressing the child warmly and keeping the crib "naked."

Due to the obvious dangers, experts have also warned that blankets or other clothing should not be placed over a baby's head.

The use of a "baby sleep bag" or "sleep sack", a soft bag with holes for the baby's arms and head, can be used as a type of bedding that warms the baby without covering its head.

=== Vaccination ===
Infants typically receive several vaccinations between the ages of 2 and 4 months, which is also the peak age for SIDS. Due to this coincidence, a number of studies have investigated the possible role of vaccinations as a cause of SIDS. These have found either no relation between vaccinations and SIDS, or a reduction of the risk of SIDS following vaccination. A 2007 meta-analysis found that vaccinations were associated with a halving of the risk of SIDS, and argued that immunisation should be a part of SIDS prevention campaigns.

== Epidemiology ==
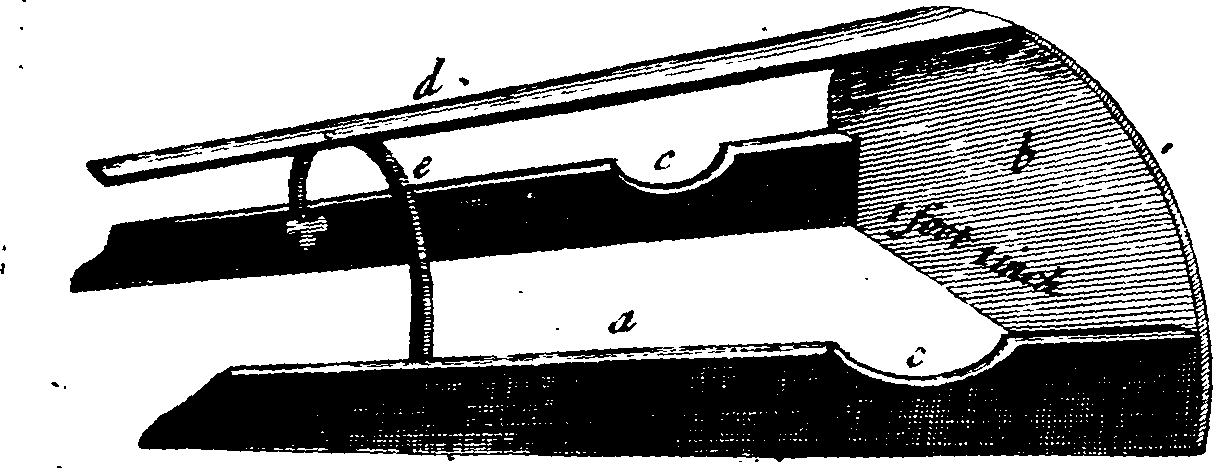
Arcutio, a device designed to prevent infant death by suffocation, Philosophical Transactions 422 (1732)

Globally, SIDS resulted in about 22,000 deaths as of 2010, down from 30,000 deaths in 1990. Rates vary significantly by population from 0.05 per 1000 in Hong Kong to 6.7 per 1000 in Native Americans.

SIDS was responsible for 0.54 deaths per 1,000 live births in the US in 2005. It is responsible for far fewer deaths than congenital disorders and disorders related to short gestation, though it is the leading cause of death in healthy infants after one month of age.

SIDS deaths in the US decreased from 4,895 in 1992 to 2,247 in 2004, a 54% decrease. During a similar time period, 1989 to 2004, SIDS as the cause of death for sudden infant death (SID) decreased from 80% to 55%, a 31% decrease. According to John Kattwinkel, chairman of the Centers for Disease Control and Prevention (CDC) Special Task Force on SIDS "A lot of us are concerned that the rate (of SIDS) isn't decreasing significantly, but that a lot of it is just code shifting".

=== Race ===
Rates of Sudden Infant Death Syndrome by race/ethnicity in the US, 2009. View chart definition.

There are persistent disparities in SIDS deaths among racial and ethnic groups in the US. In 2009, the rates of death ranged from 20.3 per 100,000 live births for Asians and Pacific Islanders to 119.2 per 100,000 live births for Native Americans and Alaska Natives. The rate of SIDS deaths is 2.25 times greater for black infants than for white infants, which may be attributable to a greater incidence of SIDS risk factors. Rates are calculated per 100,000 live births to enable more accurate comparison across groups of different total population sizes.

Research suggests that factors that contribute more directly to SIDS risk—maternal age, exposure to smoking, safe sleep practices, etc.—vary by racial and ethnic group, and therefore risk exposure also varies by these groups. Risk factors associated with prone sleeping patterns of African American families include the mother's age, household poverty index, rural/urban status of residence, and infant's age. More than 50% of African American infants were placed in non-recommended sleeping positions, according to a 2012 study completed in South Carolina, indicating that cultural factors can be protective as well as problematic.

The rate of SIDS per 1000 births varies among ethnic groups in the United States:

- Central Americans and South Americans: 0.20
- Asian/Pacific Islanders: 0.28
- Mexicans: 0.24
- Puerto Ricans: 0.53
- Whites: 0.51
- African Americans: 1.08
- Native American: 1.24

== Society and culture ==
In 1994, the topic of Cot Death was the subject of a two-part investigation of ITV's The Cook Report. Many popular media portrayals of infants show them in non-recommended sleeping positions.

== See also ==
- Fading puppy syndrome
- Failure to thrive
- Neonatal isoerythrolysis
- Newborn care and safety
- Sudden unexpected death syndrome
- Sudden unexplained death in childhood
- Sudden unexpected death in epilepsy
