= Infant bed =

Small bed for infants and very young children

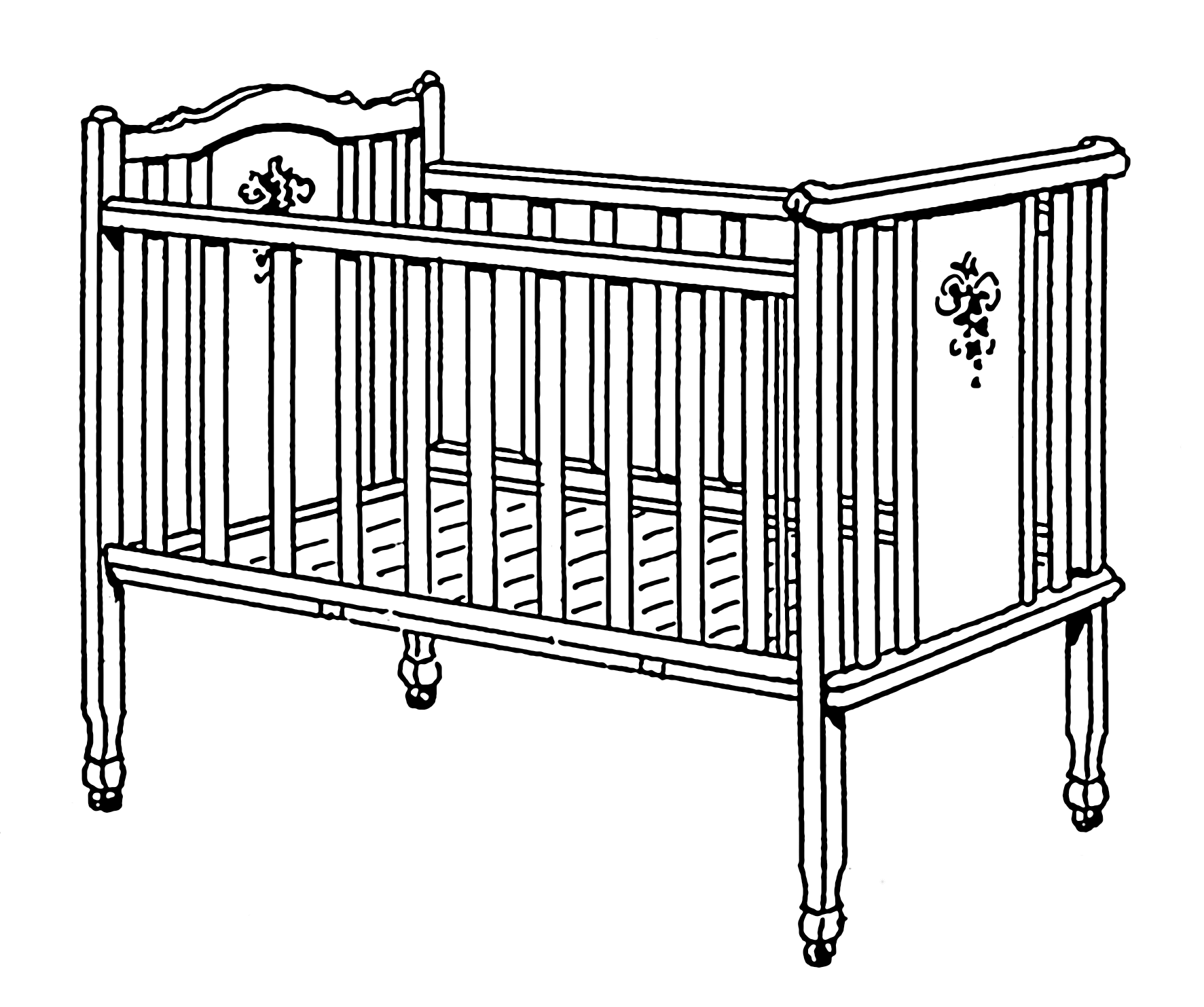
An infant bed, depicted with posts that present a strangulation hazard

An infant bed (commonly called a cot in British English, and, in American English, a crib, or far less commonly, stock) is a small bed especially for infants and very young children. Infant beds are a historically recent development intended to contain a child capable of standing. The cage-like design of infant beds restricts the child to the bed. Between one and two years of age, children can climb out and are moved to a toddler bed to prevent an injurious fall while escaping the bed.

Infant beds are more common in Western countries, employed by the majority of parents as an alternative to sharing a bed (co-sleeping).

== History ==
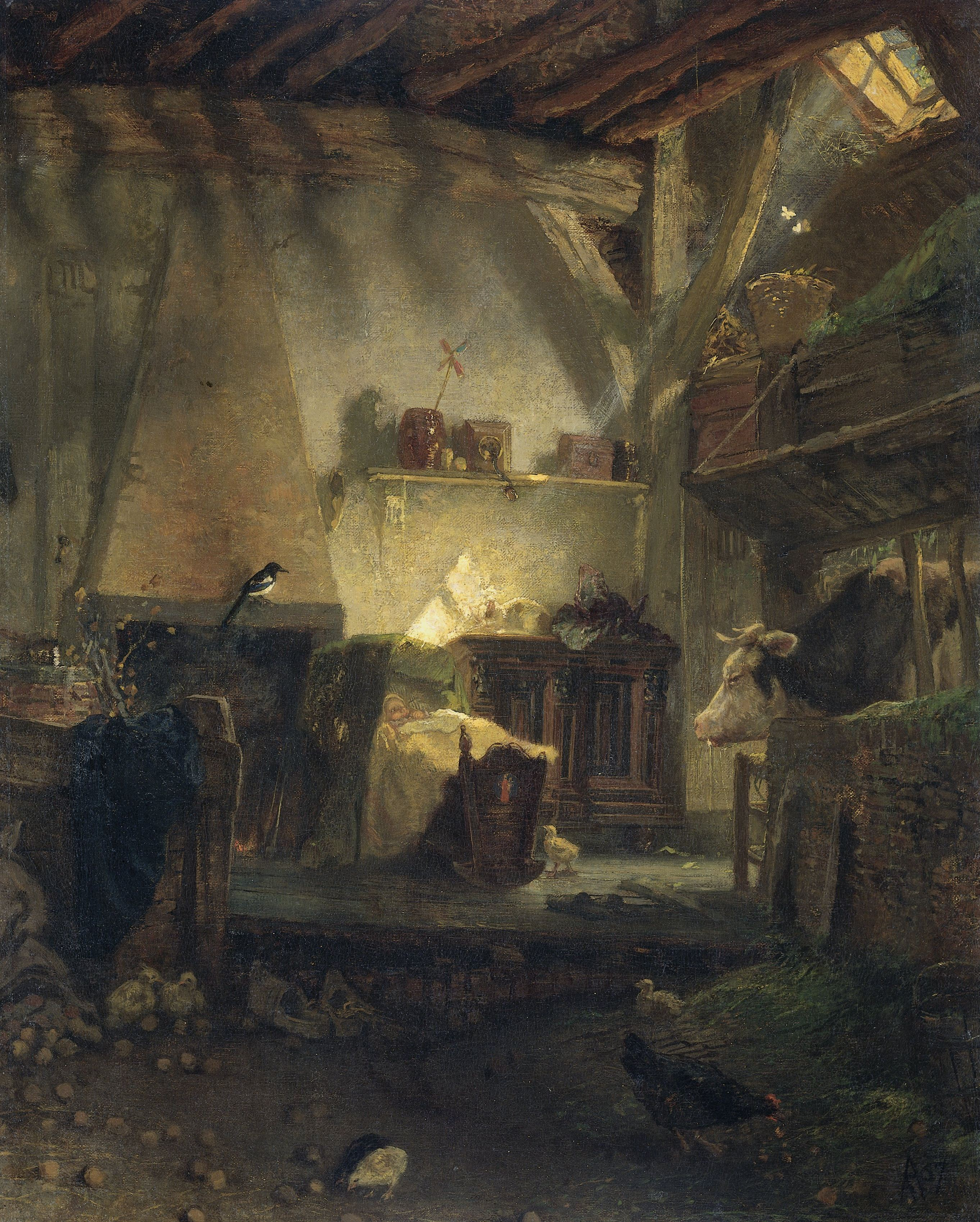
Late-18th century Dutch painting of a baby in a rocking cradle

The name "crib" was used to describe a slatted, high-sided child's bed. It derives from the Old English word "cribb" which means "manger" (food trough, referring to the shape of a bassinette) or stall (implying corralling the child).

It was not until the 19th century that infant beds developed from bassinettes. At the beginning of the 19th century, portable bassinettes appeared in Great Britain, from which the pram (i.e. perambulator) quickly developed in parallel, as it became common to take regular walks in the fresh air with infants. In German-speaking countries, this new development, initially also called a "rolling pram" or "basket pram," was championed in particular by Christoph Wilhelm Hufeland., acquiring a role of keeping the child in their bed. The development of a distinction between infant beds and bassinettes was natural because it was "considered vital that the child's bed be raised off the ground." This was due to a perception of noxious fumes below knee level, and explosive vapours near the ceiling, with good air in between. Once children's beds were raised off the ground the role of the sides changed from a convenience to a safety feature.

It was recognised that once children learn to stand they may be able to get out of a bed with low sides. According to an expert of the time, infant beds were used once the child was 12 months old. Often one side was hinged to open the enclosure, a function fulfilled in modern infant beds with a dropside. With the hinge side lowered, the bed could be moved on casters, and it could be moved right up to the carer's bed when needed.

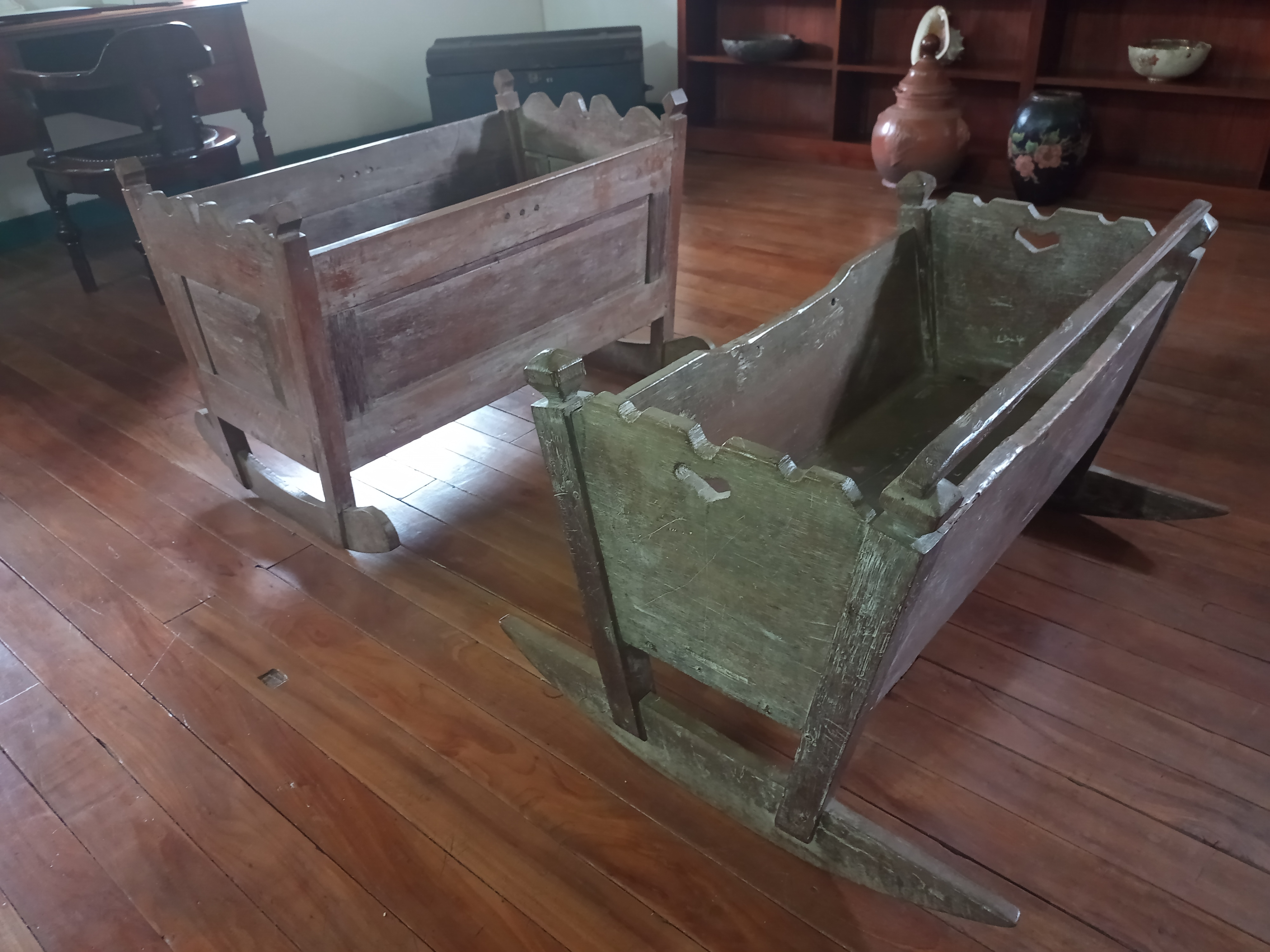
Cradles in a museum

Iron beds were developed in 17th century Italy to address concerns about bed bug infestation and moths. This new application was quickly extended to children's beds - a rockable iron bassinette (with spear-like corner posts) has been dated to 1620–1640. Proponents promoted the supposed health benefits of iron beds. Infant beds constructed from metal became popular during the later half of the 19th century. Infant beds (and bassinettes) constructed from iron with mesh or chain sides were common. Childcare experts gave iron beds their approval because it was hygienic material (compared with wood) and could not "harbour vermin", of which bed bug infestation, lice and moths were cited concerns. Commonly painted with a white vitreous enamel, later manufacturers working with wood continued to paint in the now traditional white; unfortunately this was often lead paint, and children were notorious for chewing and sucking the sweet surface.

Since 1938, babies in Finland have slept in cardboard boxes with a mattress in the bottom, which are distributed to expectant mothers as a "maternity package" containing baby supplies.

== Design ==
=== Standards ===
Standards specify acceptable and hazardous gaps in infant beds

As an example of improving safety of infant bed designs, the U.S. Consumer Product Safety Commission has set standards for infant beds sold since 1973. Between then and 2011, U.S. annual deaths attributed to infant beds fell from approximately 200 to approximately 50, and injury rates reached approximately 8,000 per year. Many of these injuries are attributed to the 25 million pre-1973 infant beds that were still in use.

Infant beds are designed to restrict the baby to the bed. The sides are too high for a baby to climb and provide no footholds. Technical standards for infant beds include considerations such as the materials used and preventing hand and head entrapment. Standards for infant beds have been specified in Australia and New Zealand, Europe, the United States and internationally. Design standards all identify and address four broad hazards:

Falls
To prevent injuries such as concussion and bone fractures from falls when trying to climb out, footholds are not permitted. Minimum cot side heights are defined for various mattress positions.
Strangulation
Infants can become trapped and strangled if their clothing gets caught on parts of a cot that stick out, or if their heads become trapped between gaps. Neither gaps large enough for a child's head nor protrusions are permitted.
Suffocation
Babies lack the motor skills or strength to turn their heads should they roll into something that obstructs their breathing. They can become trapped and suffocate if they fall into gaps created by ill-fitting or additional mattresses. Babies can also suffocate if the mattress is too soft.
Entrapment
Infants can suffer injuries to their arms and legs if they become trapped between gaps. Gaps small enough for a limb to become trapped are not permitted.

Some older cribs contained a drop gate (or drop side), a side which lowers to ease the process of putting the child into the bed, but can be raised again to restore the integrity of the enclosure. However, assembly problems and malfunctioning hardware on drop gates can cause the formation of gaps, which have been attributed to infant deaths and other major injuries. In June 2011, the United States implemented new safety standards requiring all infant beds manufactured and sold in the country to have fixed sides. In 2016, Canada implemented a similar ban.

=== Variations ===
Infant beds can be stationary or portable (portacots, portacribs or folding infant beds). In their portable form the beds generally do not feature a dropside, and portability factors are emphasised. Portacots are often made from plastics, are often smaller and fold into a compact package. Rather than bars, they will have breathable mesh sides with an aperture too small for any finger to fit into (less than 5mm by the standards). Standards for folding infant beds exist for Australia and New Zealand, Europe and international (adopted by various organisations including the American National Standards Institute).

Convertible cribs or convertible cots that can be converted into a standard sized bed as the child grows larger have become increasingly popular due to a longer useful life for the furniture. By removing both sides it becomes a toddler bed with unusually high head and foot boards, or removing just one side it becomes a daybed.

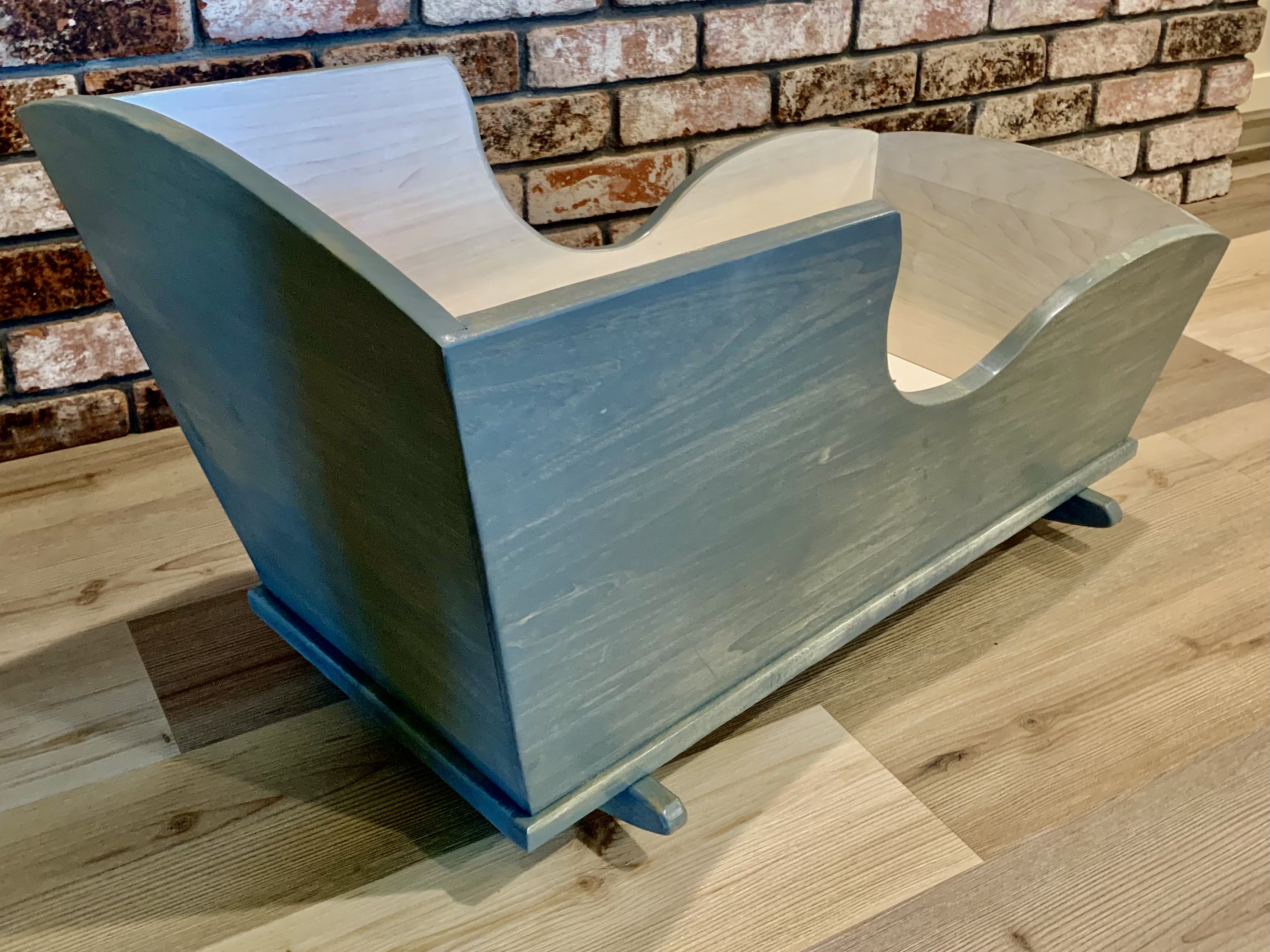
Baby cradle

Although in the U.S. there is a standard size for an infant bed (~71 cm x ~133 cm), 12% of the 2.4 million infant beds sold annually are not of this size; "mini cribs" are an example of this. The "mini crib" is an umbrella term that covers all cots smaller than the standard size. It means that travel cribs and many play yards can also be called mini cribs. This said, people often use the term for small baby beds with hard sides.

Larger infant beds are manufactured, generally for hospital use or for those with special needs. They may include a top, generally made of plastic or metal, to prevent a child from climbing out.

A cradle is an infant bed which rocks but is non-mobile. It is distinct from a typical bassinet which is a basket-like container on free-standing legs with wheels. A carbonised cradle was found in the remains of Herculaneum left from the destruction of the city by the eruption of Mount Vesuvius in 79 CE.

== Use ==
An infant bed is typically used after it is no longer safe to leave the baby in a bassinet. It has a lower center of gravity, more mass, a broader base of support and can hold a larger baby than a bassinet. Infant beds are more stable than bassinets and as such become desirable when a baby can roll, transferring inertia with their actions; a bassinet may tip, but an infant bed will not without concerted effort. Around two or three years of age children are able to escape their confinement and should be moved to a toddler bed to prevent an injurious fall while escaping their bed. Falls account for 66% of emergency room admissions due to infant beds in the United States.

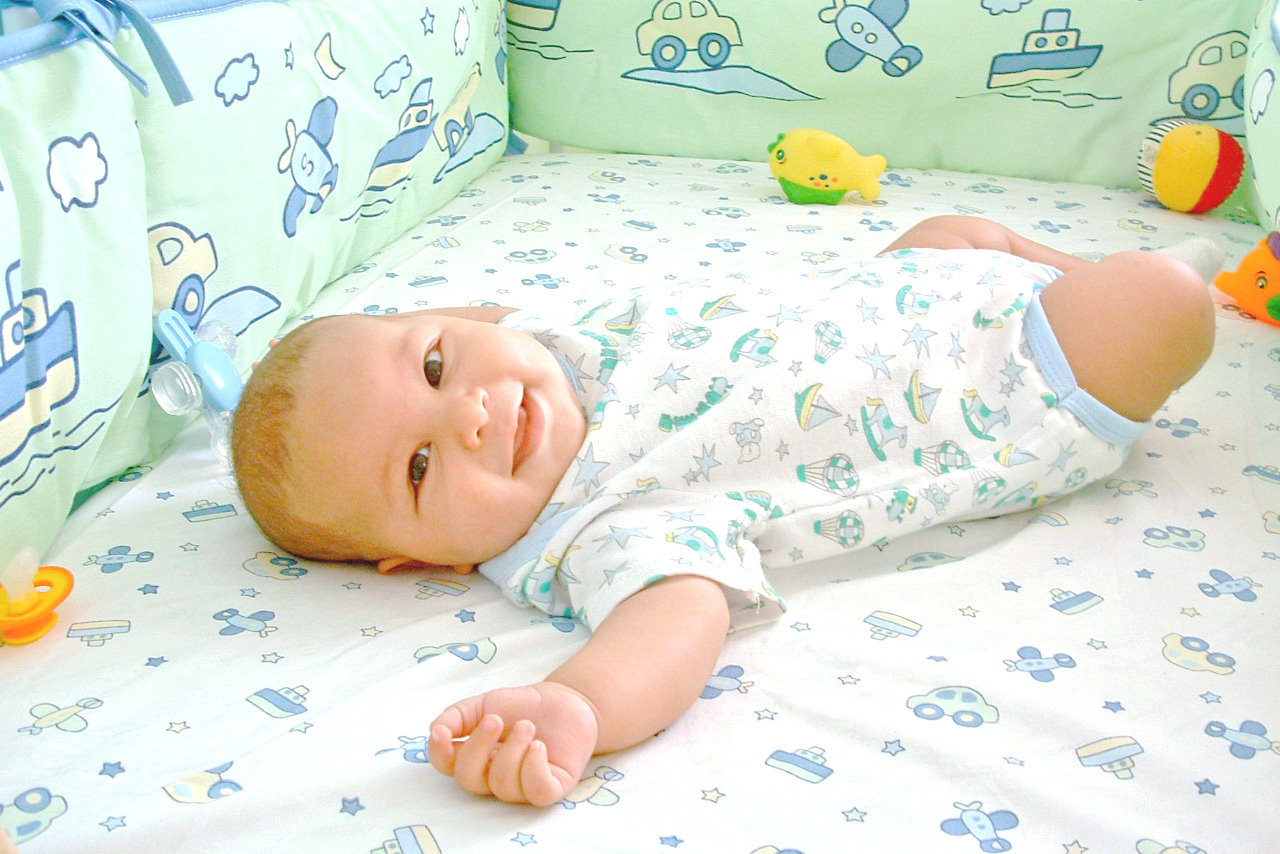
A baby lying on an elevated mattress in an infant bed with traditional crib bumpers

Placing a child into an infant bed can put strain on a caretaker's back as they typically have a mass between 11.8 kilograms (26 lb) and 16.8 kilograms (37 lb) at 36 months of age. To reduce the strain on those operating an infant bed, many infant beds feature:

- a mattress that can be in a raised position until the child is able to sit upright, and potentially lowered further when he is likely to begin standing (between 8 and 12 months).
- casters to make it easier to move the bed around.

The American Academy of Pediatrics recommends that infants under 12 months share a room (but not a bed) with their parents, as this has shown to be protective against sudden infant death syndrome (SIDS). Other sleep environment factors include supine positioning (back sleeping), use of a firm sleep surface, breastfeeding, consideration of a pacifier (dummy), and avoidance of soft bedding, overheating, and exposure to tobacco smoke.

== Accessories ==
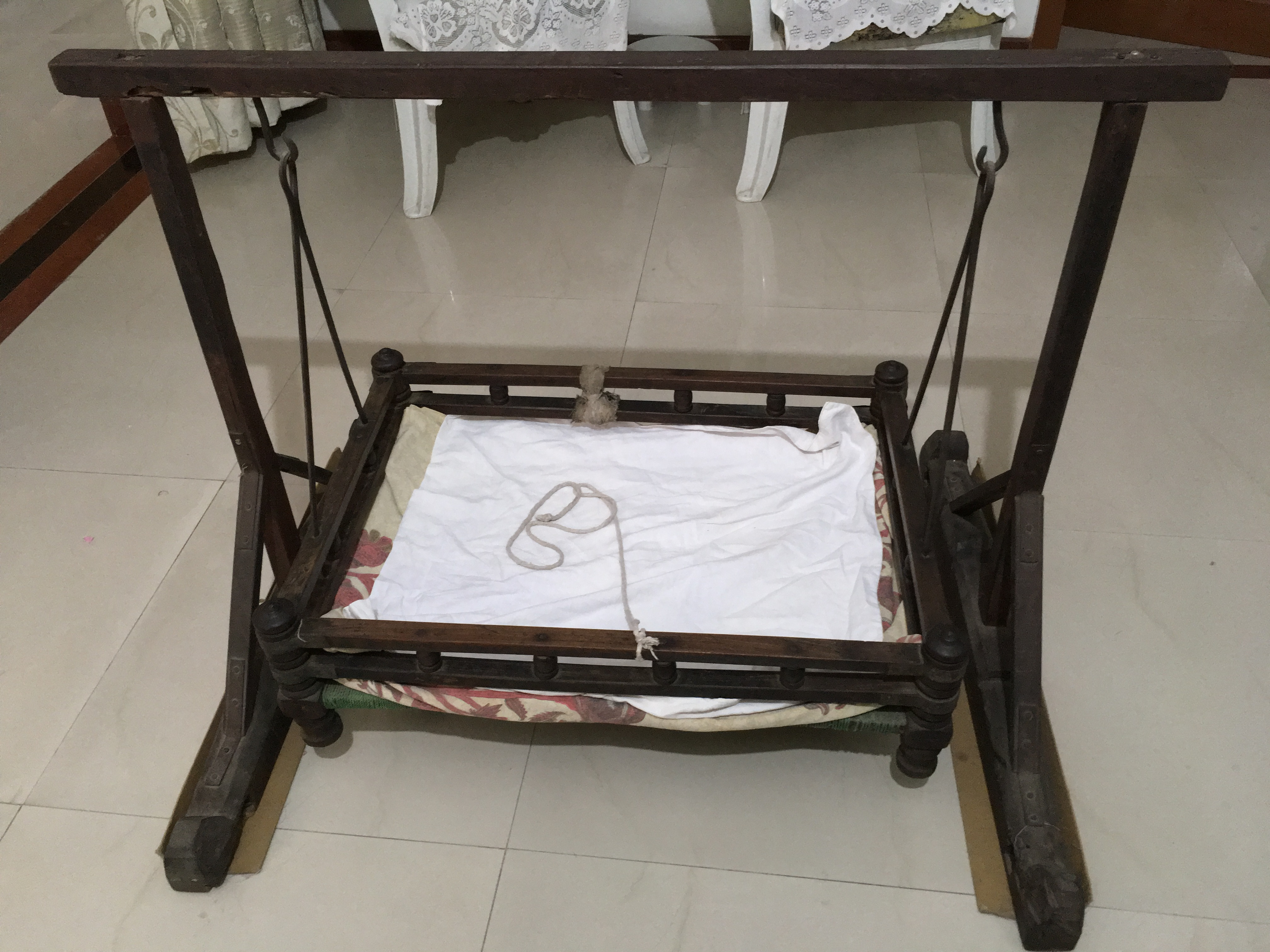
A wooden cradle from India

Scientific research has shown that the mattress influences SIDS outcomes; a firm, clean and well-fitting mattress lowers SIDS risk. However, neither mattress materials nor using a second-hand mattress affect SIDS risk. It is common to place a waterproof membrane between the mattress and the bedding to prevent uncontained bed wetting from damaging the mattress. Bed sheets ought to fit the mattress tightly so that the child cannot become entangled and suffocate; a common safety recommendation is to short sheet the bed.

Because of the pronounced risk of suffocation in very young children, and the danger of a fall from the bed for other children, the addition of anything other than sheets (including quilts, pillows and stuffed toys) into an infant bed is not recommended by health authorities. A sleepsack can be used instead to keep the baby warm. Older children can use items such as pillows and toys to construct a platform to facilitate escape, defeating the major design criteria and endangering the child.

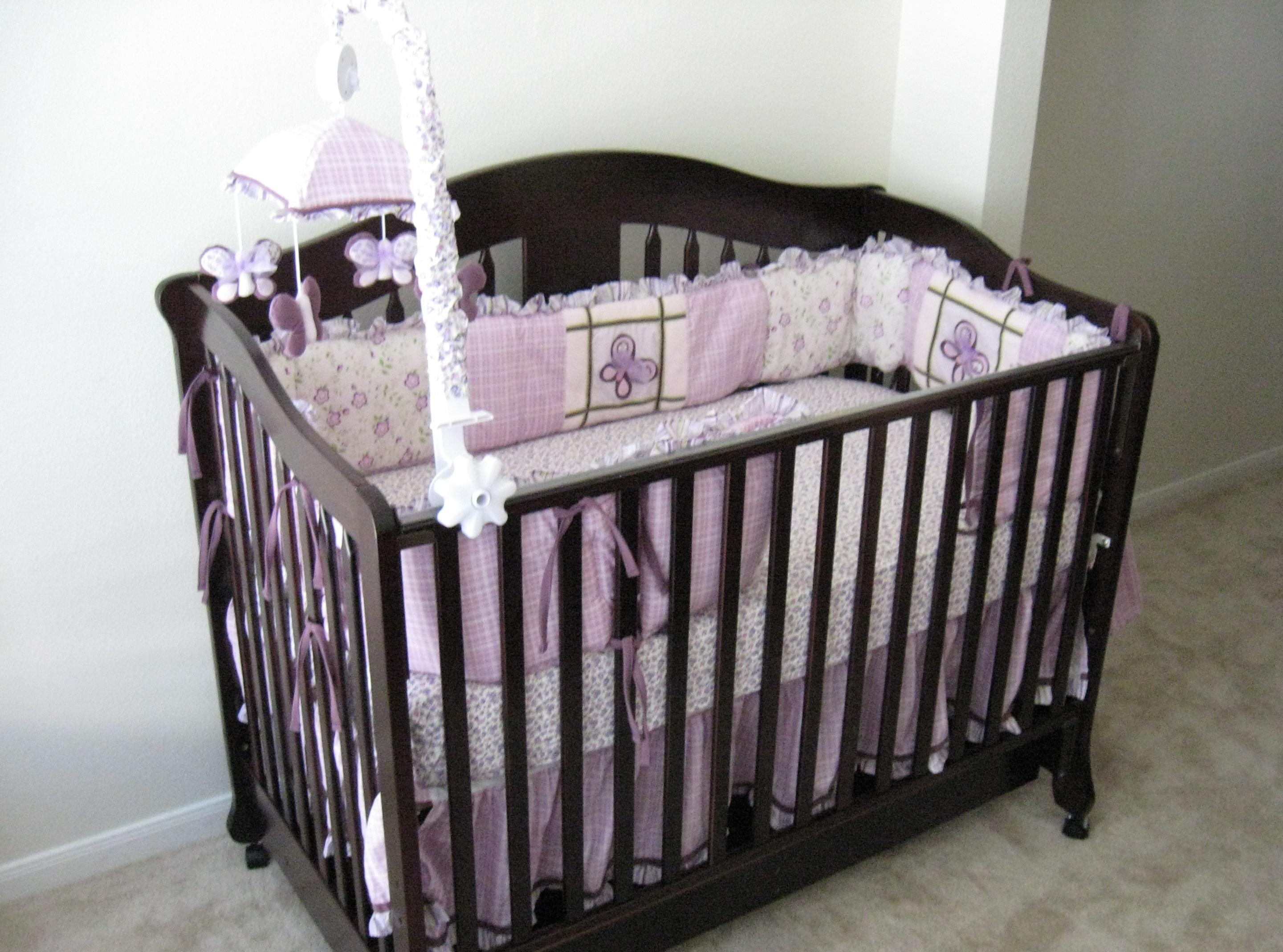
An infant bed with raised mattress, mobile and traditional crib bumpers (now considered dangerous)

Bumpers (cushioning), also known as "rompers" in some regions, are marketed to keep children from bumping against the hard sides and hurting themselves or becoming entrapped between the crib slats. A number of instances of SIDS have involved crib bumpers, and the American Academy of Pediatrics recommends against their use. The Safe Sleep for Babies Act of 2021 banned the sale or manufacture of crib bumpers in the United States, along with infant beds inclined more than 10°.

Some toys are specifically intended for an infant bed. Mobiles are musical toys to soothe the baby to sleep, but should be removed before the child can stand (8 to 12 months of age). Mirrors are to keep the children entertained while awake in the bed.

With decreasing technology prices and increasing house sizes, it has become increasingly common to have a baby monitor nearby so as to alert the caretaker when the child awakens. Without either professional endorsement or scientific evidence that they prevent SIDS, apnea monitors are available to alert the caregiver if the baby stops breathing.

Breathable mattresses are now being recommended to provide safer infant sleep. An infant who rolls onto his stomach has a much better ability to breathe with a breathable mattress, compared to a closed surface mattress.

== Manufacturers ==
All American makers of infant cribs carry JPMA safety and quality certifications.

== See also ==
- Bassinet, a common precursor bed for babies
- Single bed/Twin bed, a less common subsequent bed for toddlers due to bed height (making it hard to get in and out) and a lack of integral cot sides to stop the child accidentally rolling out while asleep (although temporary cot sides are widely available)
- Playpen, an enclosure designed to retain a child while playing
