= East Africans =

East Africans may refer to

- peoples of East African descent, see:
  - Ethiopid race (Cushites)
  - Hamites
  - Nilotic peoples
- the contemporary demographics of East Africa, see:
  - East Africa § Demographics
  - List of ethnic groups of Africa

== See also ==
- East African (disambiguation)
- Capoid
- Haplogroup L3 (mtDNA)
