= West Africans =

West Africans may refer to:

- West Africa, for contemporary inhabitants of West Africa
- Negroid, an obsolete racial grouping for populations derived from West African stock
- West Africans in the United States

Map highlighting the West African subregion of the African continent.

== See also ==
- East Africans (disambiguation)
- North Africans
- Southern Africa
