= Cushite =

Cushite may refer to:

- the historical Kingdom of Kush
- Cushitic-speaking peoples
- a biblical tribal name, see Cush (Bible)
- the natives of the Horn of Africa region, see Ethiopid race

== See also ==
- Cushi, Hebrew Bible term for dark-skinned African
- Cushite woman, wife of Moses
- Hamites
