= Ethiopian (disambiguation) =

Ethiopian (from Greek Αἰθίοπας "having a burnt face", also Latinized Ethiopia in historical contexts) may also refer to:

- pertaining to the state of Ethiopia
  - Ethiopian Airlines, the national airline of Ethiopia
- a person from Ethiopia, or of Ethiopian descent
  - see people of Ethiopia
  - the demographics of Ethiopia
  - for individuals, see List of Ethiopians
- also Ethiopic, the Ethiopian Semitic languages
  - more specifically, the Ge'ez language

== Obsolete usage ==
Historically, Aethiopian was also:

- a term referring to Sub-Saharan Africa, e.g:
  - the Ethiopian Ocean, an obsolete name for the South Atlantic
  - the Ethiopian movement
- a historical term for black African, especially in North America, e.g.:
  - the Ethiopian Serenaders
  - Ethiopian Regiment, a regiment of Black Loyalists during the American Revolution
  - Peace Movement of Ethiopia
  - Washing the Ethiopian White, a fable
  - Dysaesthesia aethiopica, a pseudoscientific diagnosis purported to afflict black slaves in the US

== See also ==
- Ethiopian race (disambiguation)
- Sudan (region)
