= Kmal Radji =

- Origin: Benin
- Genres: Slam, Hip hop, rap
- Occupations: Slam artist, singer, activist, entrepreneur, influencer
- Instrument: Vocals
- Years active: 2003–present

Kmal Radji is a slam artist, singer, pan-Africanist activist, entrepreneur, and Beninese influencer. He is one of the pioneers of slam in Benin and remains the most awarded Beninese slammer.

He is the representative of the Pan-Africanist Urgency movement in Benin.

== Biography ==
=== Beginnings ===
Kmal Radji began his artistic career with rap. It was through the group he formed at the time with artists Jupiter and Wilf Enighma that he entered the music industry. Making himself known to the general public through the rap contest called Duel Cruel, the artist, lamenting the American influence on the music style of Beninese artists, turned away from rap to convert to slam with his own style in order to encourage African youth to take charge of themselves. Having been involved in slam since 2003, he created in 2005, along with the slammer in the Fon language, Thibault Adotanou, free-word stages.

In 2007, he established the first slam festival in Benin to give young people an opportunity to express themselves through the art of slam. In the same year, he formed with nine other Beninese slammers the collective 10 bp 229 with the aim of promoting slam.

To denounce the phenomenon of the placed child, he released in 2010, an album of six tracks entitled "L’écoute" in collaboration with Thibault Adotanou with the help of the European Union.

=== Recognition ===
In 2011, on the initiative of the community organization No limit Génération, Kmal Radji wrote "Assume ta jeunesse", a piece of awakening and engagement for African youth. After the production of the clip by the community organization No limit Génération, Assume ta jeunesse was broadcast on several television channels, radio stations, and social networks in Africa and internationally, reaching the level of a continental hit. It was also shown as an awakening exercise in several schools, with Kmal Radji following up with interviews, documentaries, and performances in Togo, Mali, and Burkina Faso. And everywhere he goes, he leaves messages of awakening and engagement to African youth so that they may assert themselves for the development of the African continent.

== Discography ==
Albums studio :

- 2010 : L'écoute
- 2012 : Aube Nouvelle
