= Ethiopian race =

Ethiopian race may refer to:

- Ethiopian people
- Ethiopid race
- Negroid race, as defined by Johann Friedrich Blumenbach in Handbuch der Naturgeschichte (1779), peoples of most of Africa, Australia, New Guinea and other Pacific Islands
