= Giuseppe Sergi =

Italian anthropologist (1841–1936)

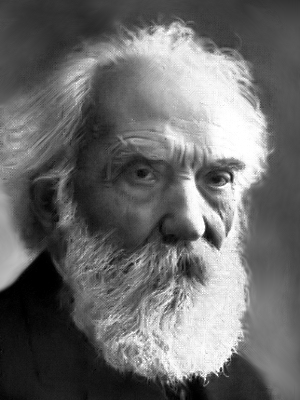
- Giuseppe Sergi
- Born: March 20, 1841; Messina, Kingdom of the Two Sicilies
- Died: 17 October 1936 (aged 95); Rome, Kingdom of Italy
- Known for: Mediterraneanism
- Parent(s): Paolo Sergi and Alessandra Sergi (née Brigandì)
- Scientific career
- Fields: Biological anthropology
- Workplaces: University of Bologna; Sapienza University of Rome

Signature
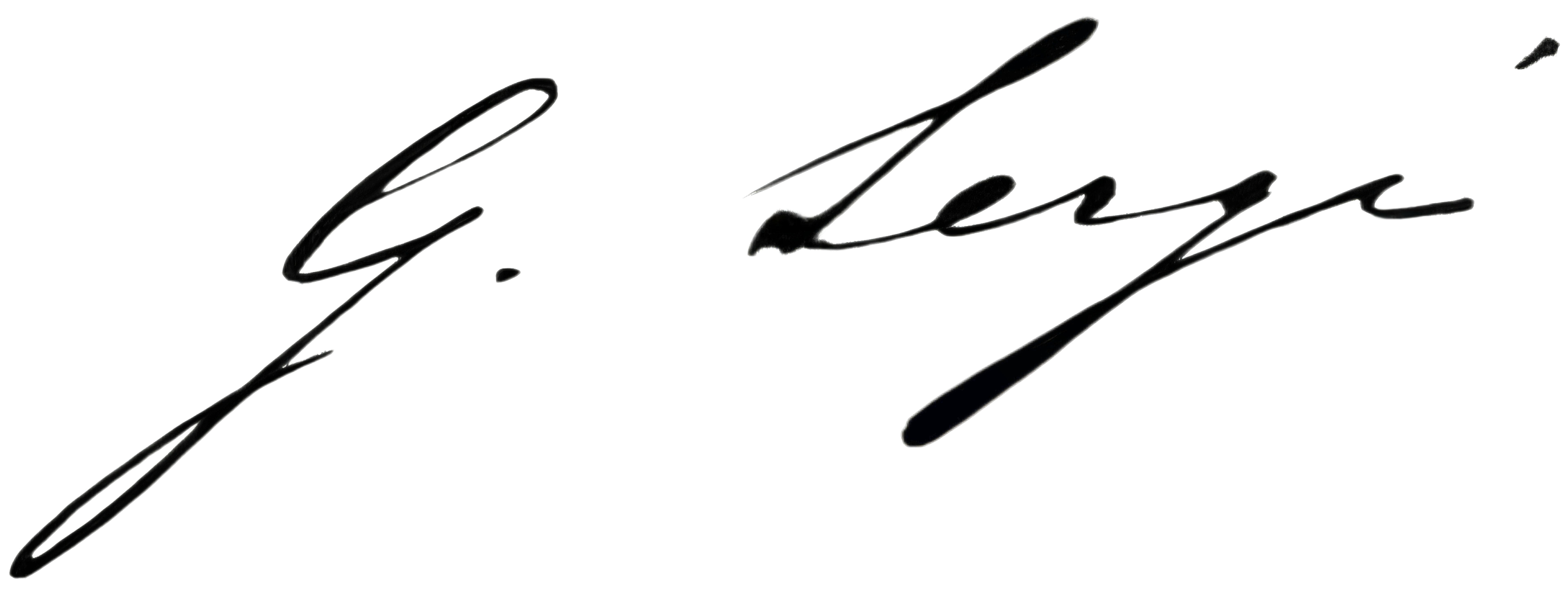

Giuseppe Sergi (March 20, 1841 – October 17, 1936) was an Italian anthropologist of the early twentieth century, best known for his opposition to Nordicism in his books on the racial identity of Mediterranean peoples. He rejected existing racial typologies that identified Mediterranean peoples as "dark whites" because they implied a Nordicist conception of Mediterranean peoples descending from whites who had become racially mixed with non-whites which he claimed was false. His concept of the Mediterranean race, identified Mediterranean peoples as being an autonomous brunet race and he claimed that the Nordic race was descended from the Mediterranean race whose skin had depigmented to a pale complexion after it moved north. This concept became important to the modelling of racial difference in the early twentieth century.

== Life ==
Born in Messina, Sicily, Sergi first studied law and then linguistics and philosophy. At the age of 19 he took part in Garibaldi's expedition to Sicily. He later took courses in physics and anatomy, finally specializing in racial anthropology as a student of Cesare Lombroso.

In 1880 he was appointed as professor of anthropology at the University of Bologna. At this time the discipline of anthropology was still associated with the literature faculty. In the following years, thanks to the activity of his laboratory of anthropology and psychology, he helped establish the discipline on a more scientific basis. In 1884 he moved to the University of Rome where he developed a program of research into both anthropology and psychology. He was elected as a member to the American Philosophical Society in 1885.

On 4 June 1893, the Sergi took the lead in founding the Roman Society of Anthropology (now the Italian Anthropological Institute (Istituto Italiano di Antropologia)). He also began the journal Atti della Società Romana di Antropologia (now the Journal of Anthropological Sciences). Both the society and journal were associated with the university. He was initially assigned temporary premises in the School of Application for Engineers in San Pietro in Vincoli but in 1887 moved to the old building of the Roman College, where Sergi dedicated part of the space to the creation of an anthropological museum.

Internationally renowned for his contributions to anthropology, he also succeeded in establishing the International Conference of Psychology in Rome, 1905, under his presidency of the society.

He died in Rome in 1936. His son Sergio Sergi (1878–1972), also a noted anthropologist, developed his father's theories.

== Racial theories ==
Sergi's initial contribution was to oppose the use of the cephalic index to model population ancestry, arguing that over all cranial morphology was more useful. However, Sergi's major theoretical achievement was his model of human ancestry, fully articulated in his books Human Variation (Varietà umane. Principio e metodo di classificazione) and The Mediterranean Race (1901), in which he argued that the earliest European peoples arose from original populations in the Horn of Africa, and were related to Hamitic peoples. This primal "Eurafrican race" split into three main groups, the Hamites, the Mediterranean race and the north European Nordic race. Semitic people were closely related to Mediterraneans but constituted a distinct "Afroasian" group. The four great branches of the Mediterranean stock were the Libyans or Berbers, the Ligurians, the Pelasgians and the Iberians. Ancient Egyptians were considered by Sergi as a branch of the Hamitic race.

According to Sergi the Mediterranean race, the "greatest race in the world", was responsible for the great civilisations of ancient times, including those of Egypt, Carthage, Greece and Rome. These Mediterranean peoples were quite distinct from the peoples of northern Europe.

Sergi argued that the Mediterraneans were more creative and imaginative than other peoples, which explained their ancient cultural and intellectual achievements, but that they were by nature volatile and unstable. In his book The Decline of the Latin Nations he argued that Northern Europeans had developed stoicism, tenacity and self-discipline due to the cold climate, and so were better adapted to succeed in modern civic cultures and economies.

=== Anti-Nordicism ===
These theories were developed in opposition to Nordicism, the claim that the Nordic race was of pure Aryan stock and naturally superior to other Europeans. Sergi ridiculed Nordicists who claimed that the leading Greeks and Romans were of Nordic background and argued that the Germanic invasions at the end of the Roman Empire had produced "delinquency, vagabondage and ferocity". Sergi believed that the Aryans were originally "Eurasiatic" barbarians who migrated from the Hindu Kush into Europe. He argued that the Italians had originally spoken a Hamitic language until the Aryan (Indo-European) Italic language spread across the country. Some Aryan influence was detectable in Northern Italy, but, racially speaking, Italians were unaffected by Aryan migrants.

Sergi expanded on those theories in later publications. Despite his denigration of Aryans and emphasis on Mediterranean racial identity, he denied that he was motivated by national pride, asserting that his works had the "goal of establishing the veracity of the facts without racial prejudice, without diminishing the value of one human type in order to exalt another one."

His last book, The Britons (1936), sought to trace the rise of the British Empire to the Mediterranean component of the British population.

== Theory of emotions ==
Giuseppe Sergi, concurrent with William James and Carl Lange (the three independently), developed a theory of emotions according to which emotion is the mind's perception of physiological conditions that result from some stimulus.

== Works in English translation ==
- (1894). The Varieties of the Human Species. Washington: The Smithsonian Institution.
- (1901). The Mediterranean Race: a Study of the Origins of European Peoples. London: Walter Scott.
- (1911). "Differences in Customs and Morals and their Resistance to Rapid Change," Papers on Inter-racial Problems. London: P. S. King and Son.

== See also ==
- Mediterraneanism
