= Chandler Beach =

American entrepreneur and encyclopedist

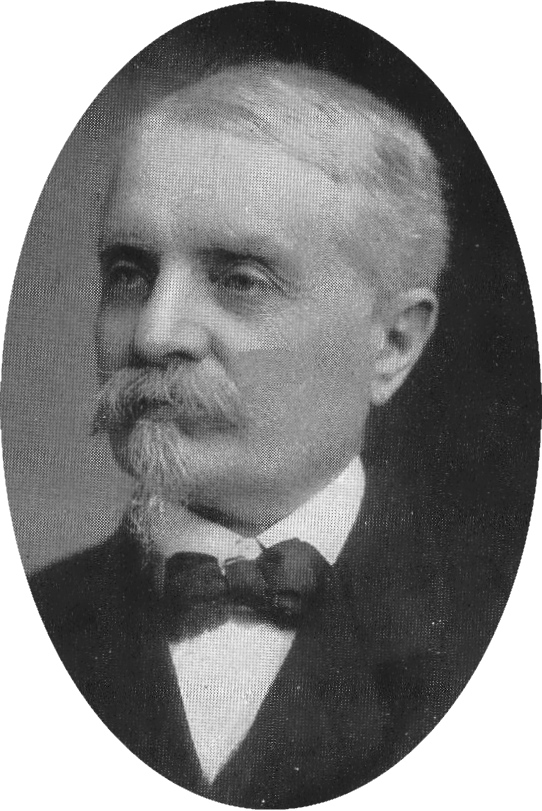
Chandler B. Beach, c. 1914

Chandler Belden Beach (1839–1928) was an American entrepreneur and encyclopedist. A captain in the American Civil War, he became a sales agent in Chicago for the Encyclopædia Britannica. Realizing there was a market demand for a more compact, less-detailed encyclopedia, he founded the publishing company C. B. Beach & Company, and published numerous reference works, including multiple editions of the "Youth's Cyclopedia".

Upon his retirement he sold the company to his associate, Frank Compton, who later renamed it F. E. Compton & Co.. Compton produced Compton's Pictured Encyclopedia in 1922, which later became the well-known and highly regarded Compton's Encyclopedia, initially purchased by Encyclopædia Britannica in 1961 and today known as Compton's by Britannica.

== As encyclopedist ==
Beach was the editor and publisher of Youth's Cyclopedia (2 volumes, 1892) and the Student's Cyclopaedia (2 volumes, 1893), which turned into The Student's Reference Work (1901).

The New Student's Reference Work was published by C. B. Beach & Company (1909,1911,1912), then by F. E. Compton & Co. from 1912.

== Legacy ==
Frank Compton became his associate in 1894, and general manager of C. B. Beach & Company in 1905. Compton took over the publishing firm when Beach retired in 1907, and the name of the company later changed to F. E. Compton & Co..

F. E. Compton & Co. went on to produce Compton's Pictured Encyclopedia in 1922.

Publishing rights to the F.E. Compton & Company products were acquired by Encyclopædia Britannica, Inc. in 1961, and subsequently renamed as Compton's by Britannica. The encyclopedia is still in print in 2025.

== Gallery ==
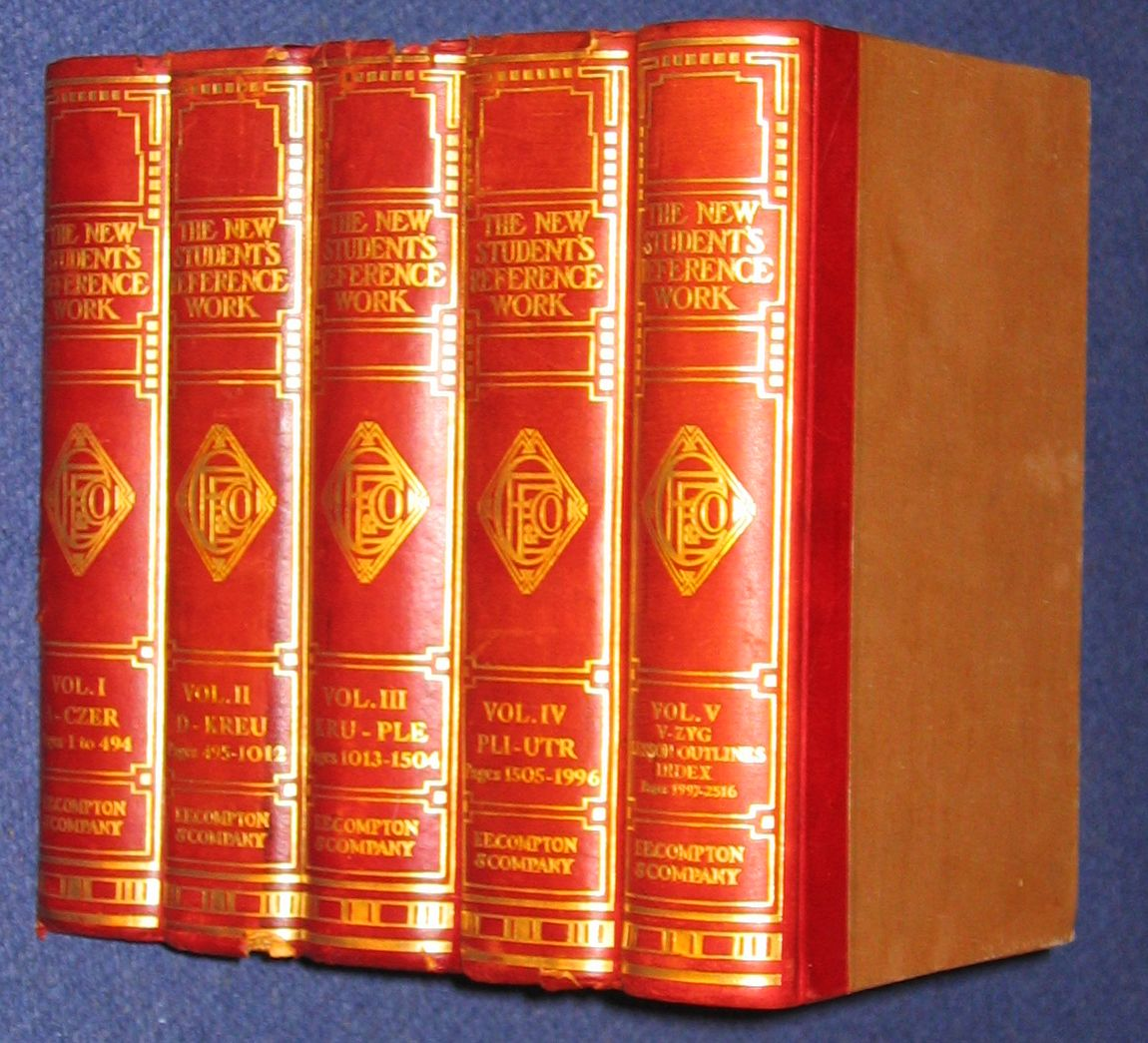
The New Student's Reference Work, 1914

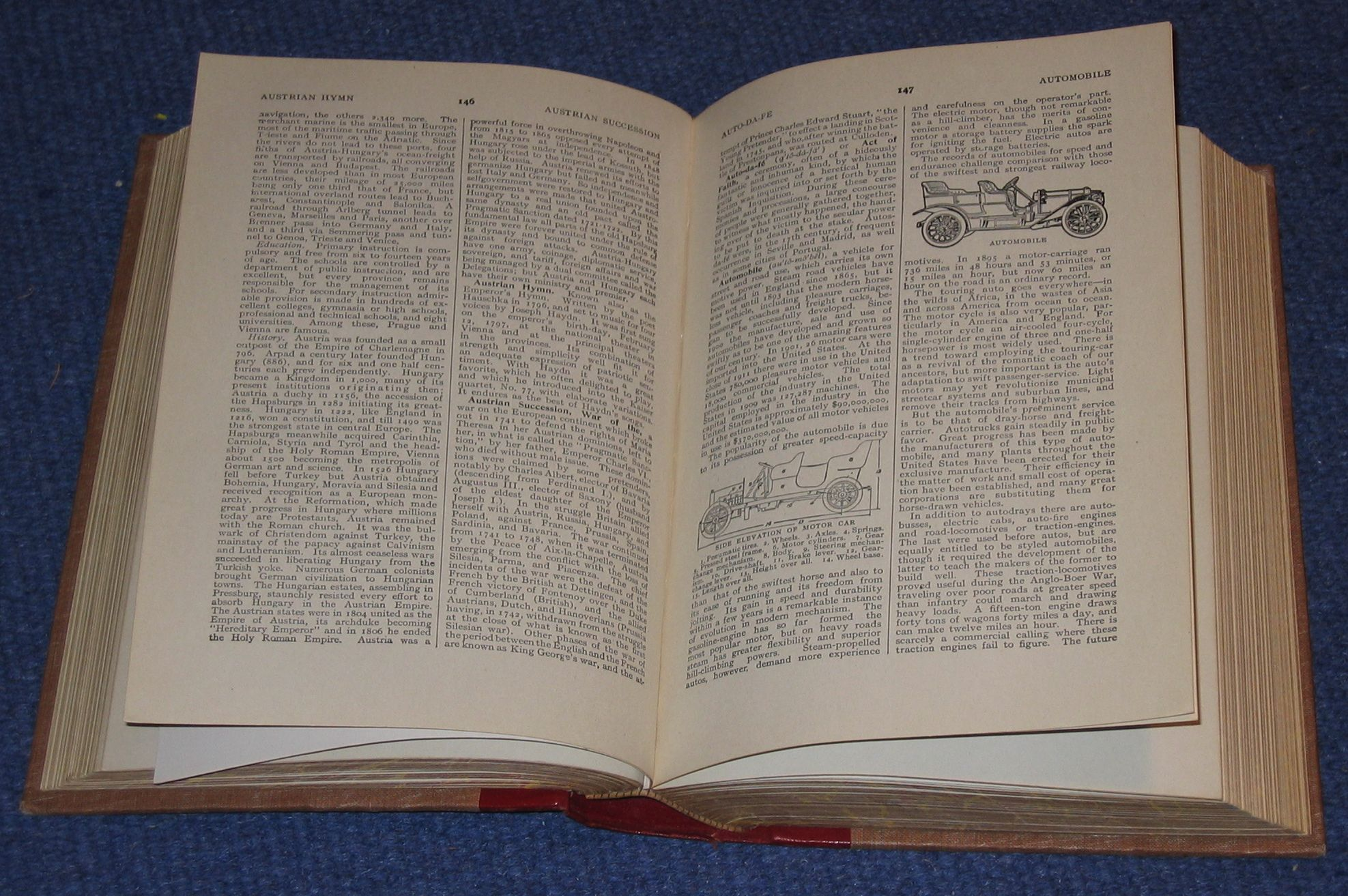
"Automobile", from the same

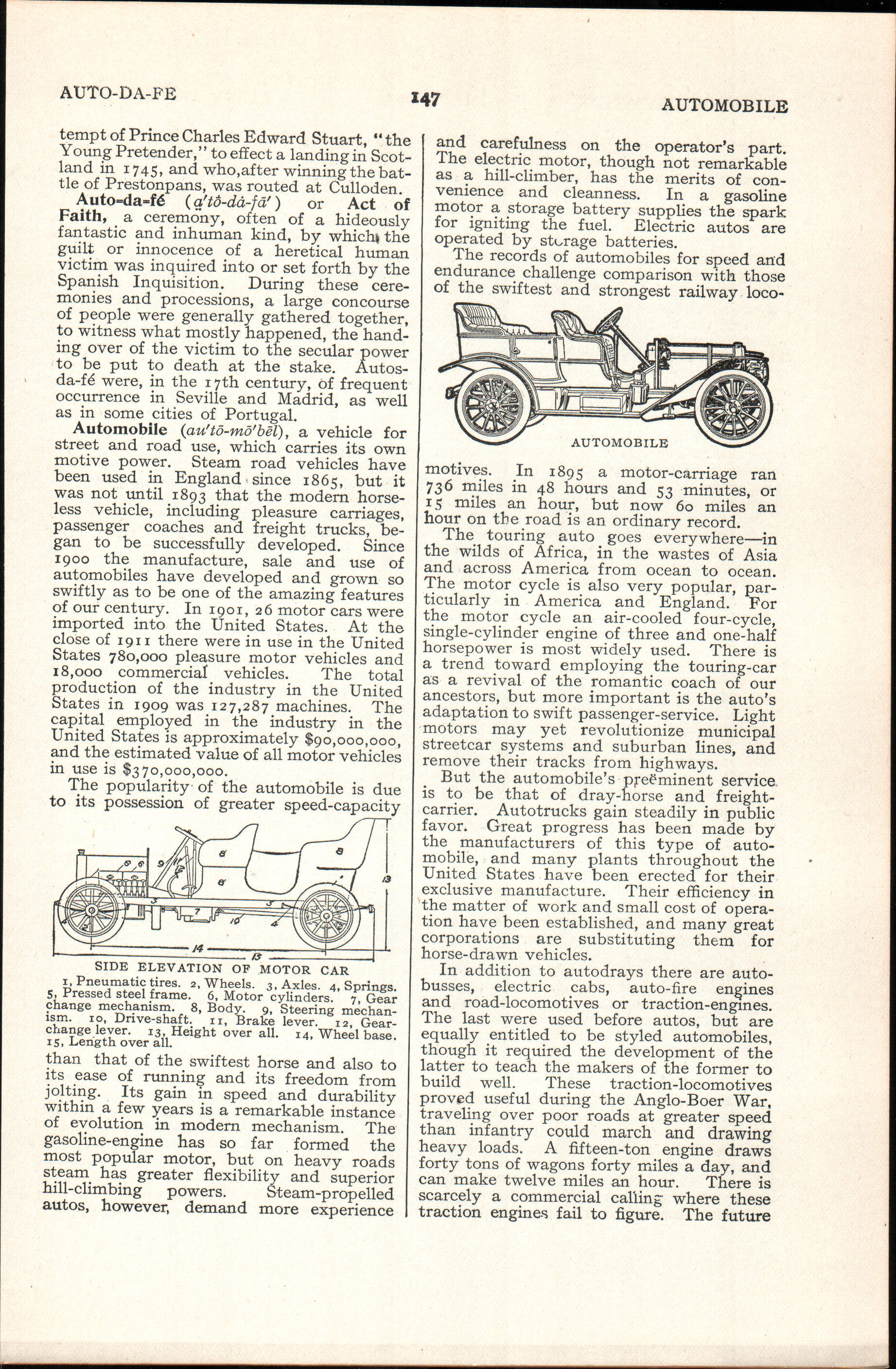
This page digitized at Wikisource
