= F. E. Compton =

American publisher (1874–1950)

Frank Elbert Compton (August 7, 1874 – May 13, 1950) was a publisher of encyclopedias and other reference works, most notably Compton's Pictured Encyclopedia from 1922, later named Compton's Encyclopedia.

Compton graduated from the University of Wisconsin–Madison, and from 1894 he was an associate of publisher Chandler Beach. Compton became the general manager of C. B. Beach & Company in 1905. He took over the firm when Beach retired in 1907, and the company name later changed to F. E. Compton & Co..

Compton spent his career in Chicago and he died in La Jolla, California.

The New Student's Reference Work was published by C. B. Beach & Company until 1912, then by F. E. Compton & Co..

Publishing rights to the F.E. Compton & Company products were acquired by Encyclopædia Britannica, Inc. in 1961, and the encyclopedia is still in print as Compton's by Britannica.
