= Compton's Encyclopedia =

English-language encyclopedia

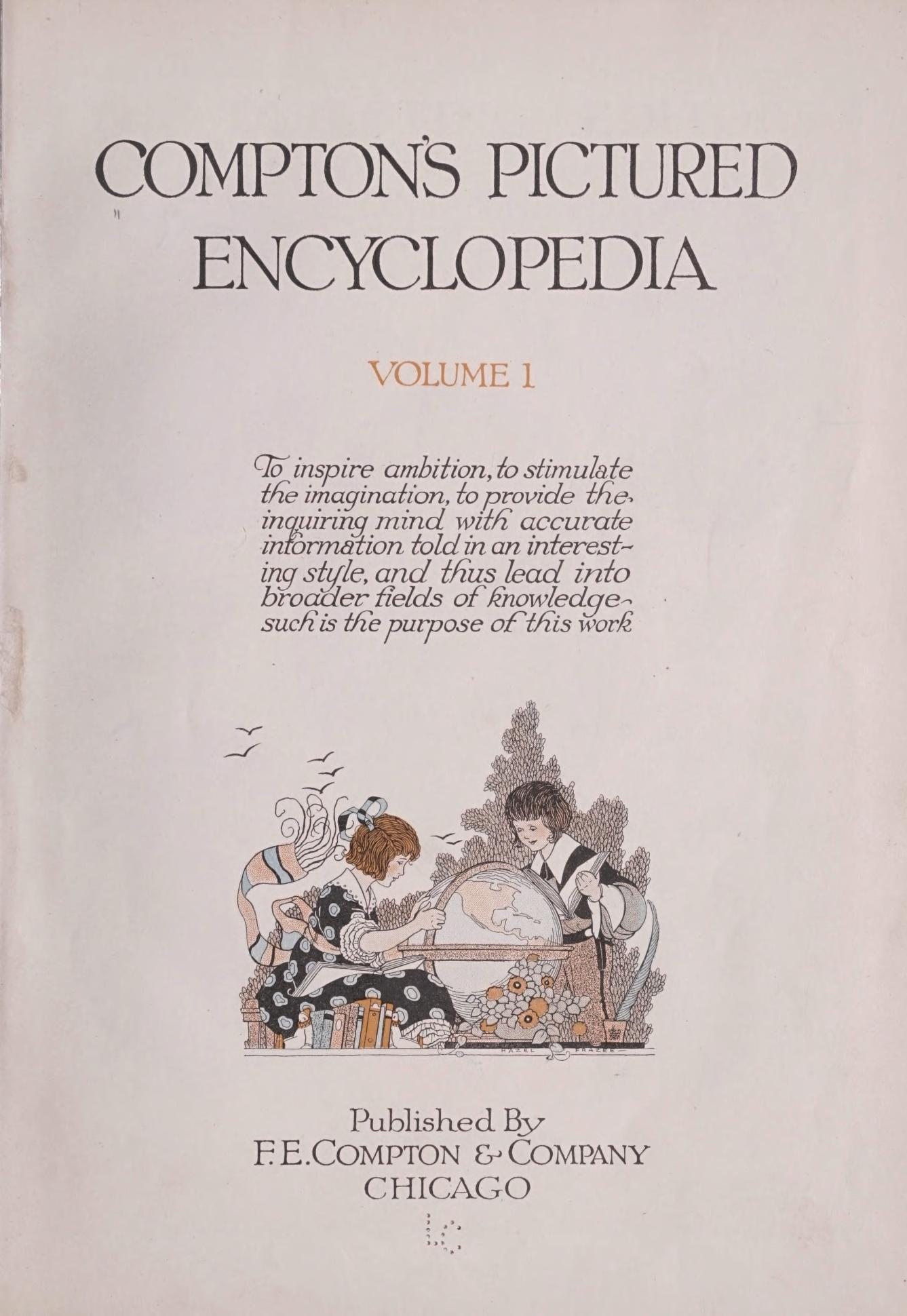
- Title page of Volume 1, first edition (1922)
- Language: English
- Subject: General
- Genre: Reference encyclopedia
- Publisher: F. E. Compton & Company; Encyclopædia Britannica, Inc.
- Publication date: First published in 1922; 104 years ago
- Publication place: United States

Compton's Encyclopedia and Fact-Index is an American English-language home and school encyclopedia first published in 1922 as Compton's Pictured Encyclopedia. The word "Pictured" was removed from the title with the 1968 edition. The encyclopedia is now advertised as Compton's by Britannica.

== History ==
The set was originally published in 1922 in 8 volumes as Compton's Pictured Encyclopedia by F. E. Compton and Company of Chicago. It was titled "Pictured" because no other encyclopedia at the time had as large or as diverse a collection of illustrations. The encyclopedia was expanded to 10 volumes in 1924 and 15 in 1932. In 1940 the title was expanded to Compton's Pictured Encyclopedia and Fact Index to emphasize its "Fact-Index" feature which combined a general index with dictionary type entries and tables. The general editor from 1922 to 1961 was Guy Stanton Ford. He was succeeded by Charles Alfred Ford, and then Donald Lawson in 1964. In the early 1960s, F. E. Compton Co. was purchased by Encyclopædia Britannica, Inc. In 1968 the title was changed to simply Compton's Encyclopedia and expanded to 24 volumes. It expanded to 26 volumes in 1974.

The 1985 edition had 26 volumes, 11,000 pages, 10,000 articles, and 8.5 million words. There were 35,500 cross-references and an index with 150,000 entries, including 30,000 dictionary style fact entries. There were 20,500 illustrations, about 20% in color and 2,000 maps. Articles averaged 850 words, or more than a full page. Most of the main articles were not signed and none of the fact entries were. 600 editors, advisors, artists and contributors were listed at the front of Vol. 1. Potentially difficult technical terms were italicized and defined in context, and articles used a "pyramid structure", beginning in simple, elementary terms and gradually becoming more complex and detailed.

Despite being continuously revised, by the late 1970s it was being criticized for being out of date, particularly with regard to its illustrations. However, in the early 1980s the publishers began a thorough revision under Michael Reed and the contents were brought more up to date. This included a more egalitarian approach to women's roles in society and revisions of articles such as abortion, adoption, Argentina and the Falkland Islands. Controversial issues like abortion were handled carefully, giving both sides of the argument, while other issues such as circumcision and homosexuality were not mentioned at all.

The 1993 print edition of Compton's Encyclopedia had 26 volumes, 9 million words, 10,590 pages, 5,250 articles, 28,750 Fact Index definitions, 450 bibliographies, 22,510 illustrations and maps, 35,500 cross references and 154,000 index entries. Only 1,100 articles were signed, but a list of nearly 600 contributors, advisors and editorial staff were listed at the front of Vol. 1. By this time Britannica had invested $13.5 million in revamping the encyclopedia, now under the direction of Dale Good, who became general editor in 1986. It had risen again in the eyes of encyclopedia critics and was considered a first-rate example of an encyclopedia in its class. Controversial issues such as AIDS, abortion, adoption, capital punishment, drunk driving, euthanasia, homosexuality, race relations, missing children, sexual harassment, sexually-transmitted disease and women's rights, were given greater coverage. Illustrations were brought up to date and were 65% in color. The pyramid style article format was retained, but italicization of potentially unfamiliar words was dropped for esthetic purposes, though potentially difficult words such as palaeographic, miscarriage and recession were still defined in context. Major articles such as computer and genetics had glossaries for technical terms. After 1992 the "Fact-Index" was moved to volume 26 - it had previously been divided between each volume. Subjects that were considered too trendy, ephemeral or minor, that did not have articles in the main text, but did have "Fact-Index" definitions included MTV, Madonna, electric automobiles, Robert Motherwell, motion sickness, Moral Re-Armament and Moultrie, Georgia. Incidentally, the "Fact-Index" definitions themselves were not indexed.

Compton's Multimedia Encyclopedia CD-ROM (1989) was the first multimedia encyclopedia. Grolier's earlier CD-ROM encyclopedia was not multimedia.

The encyclopedia was founded by Frank E. Compton in 1922. Publishing rights to the F.E. Compton & Company products were acquired by Encyclopædia Britannica, Inc. in 1961.

Encyclopædia Britannica, Inc. initially owned Compton's Encyclopedia from 1961 to 1993, and later reacquired it in 2002. Britannica had sold its Compton's interests to the Tribune Company in 1993, and for a time Compton's Encyclopedia was a product of The Learning Company, which purchased Broderbund in 1998. In March 2002, Encyclopædia Britannica, Inc. "acquired an exclusive license to publish and distribute Compton's Encyclopedia in print and CD-ROM from Broderbund LLC and Success Publishing Group".

== Print editions ==
- Compton's Encyclopedia
  - 8 volumes, 1922
  - 10 volumes, 1924, 1925, 1926, 1927, 1928, 1929, 1930, in two binding styles: one with plain red boards with insignia, the other with dark brown embossed boards de-luxe.
  - 16 volumes, 1931
  - 15 volumes, 1933, 1935, 1939, 1948
  - 20 volumes, 1937, 1938, 1940, 1941, 1945, 1949, 1950, 1951, 1953, 1956, 1957, 1958, 1962
- Compton's Encyclopedia and Fact-Index
  - 24 volumes 1969–1971
  - 22 volumes, 1972, 1973
  - 26 volumes, annually 1974–1978 and 1980–1995, 2004
- Compton's by Britannica
  - 26 volumes, 2009

== Yearbooks ==
Compton's has also published a yearly supplement, The Compton yearbook from 1958 to the present.

== CD-ROM editions ==
- Compton's Multimedia Encyclopedia, CD-ROM, 1989, the first "multimedia" CD-ROM
- Compton's Family Encyclopedia, CD-ROM, 1991, a "stripped down" version of Compton's Multimedia Encyclopedia
- Compton's Interactive Encyclopedia, CD-ROM, 1993, 1995 through 2001.

Britannica's 1989 Compton's Multimedia Encyclopedia was the first "multimedia" CD-ROM encyclopedia. It won the 1991 Software Publishers Association Excellence in Software Award for Best Education Program. The product was invented by Britannica's Michael Reed who served as its Creative Director during its production. Reed coordinated with a team from Jostens Company out of San Diego that actually built the product.

Grolier's 1985 Academic American Encyclopedia on CD-ROM was text-only. In 1990, when it was called The New Grolier Electronic Encyclopedia (1988–1991), still pictures were added.

Variants of Compton's CD-ROM encyclopedias were Compton's Concise Encyclopedia, Compton's Family Encyclopedia, and Compton's Interactive Encyclopedia.

== Environments in Compton's Interactive Encyclopedia ==
- Grandma's Attic (top left)
- Madcap Music (top right)
- Compton's Newsroom (middle left)
- Kaleidescape (middle right)
- Compton's Skyship (bottom left)
- Wild and Free (bottom right)

== See also ==
- Lists of encyclopedias
- List of online encyclopedias
