= List of African countries by population growth rate =

The list is based on CIA World Factbook estimates for the year 2025. Only fully recognised sovereign states with United Nations membership are included on this list.

== List ==
CIA World Factbook (2024)

Rank	Country	Annual growth (%)
1	South Sudan	4.65
2	Niger	3.66
3	Angola	3.33
4	Benin	3.29
5	Equatorial Guinea	3.23
6	Uganda	3.18
7	Democratic Republic of the Congo	3.11
8	Chad	3.01
9	Mali	2.90
10	Zambia	2.83
11	Burundi	2.81
12	Guinea	2.74
13	Tanzania	2.72
14	Cameroon	2.71
15	Somalia	2.55
16	Sudan	2.55
17	Mozambique	2.54
17	Guinea-Bissau	2.54
19	Nigeria	2.52
20	Senegal	2.46
21	Togo	2.41
22	Burkina Faso	2.40
23	Republic of the Congo	2.38
24	Gabon	2.37
24	Ethiopia	2.37
26	Liberia	2.32
26	Sierra Leone	2.32
28	Malawi	2.22
29	Madagascar	2.18
30	The Gambia	2.16
31	Ghana	2.15
32	Côte d'Ivoire	2.13
33	Kenya	2.06
34	Mauritania	1.92
35	Zimbabwe	1.91
36	Djibouti	1.89
37	Central African Republic	1.76
38	Namibia	1.72
39	Rwanda	1.62
40	Algeria	1.54
41	Egypt	1.49
42	Libya	1.44
43	São Tomé and Príncipe	1.42
44	Botswana	1.34
45	Comoros	1.30
46	Cabo Verde	1.16
47	Eritrea	1.12
48	South Africa	1.07
49	Morocco	0.84
50	Lesotho	0.76
51	Eswatini	0.70
52	Tunisia	0.58
53	Seychelles	0.60
54	Mauritius	0.07
