= Youth in Africa =

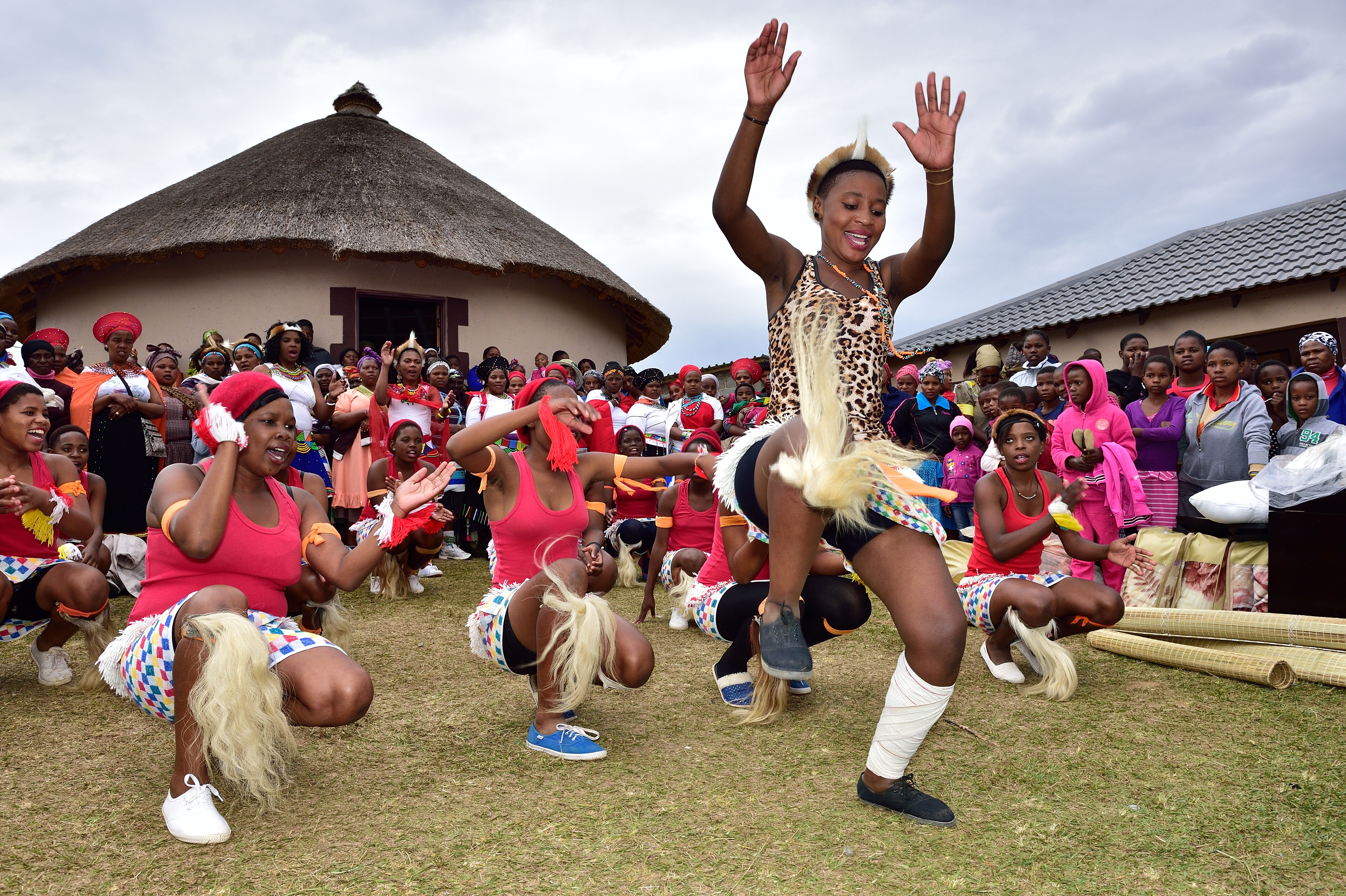
Young people in South Africa

Youth in Africa constituted 19% of the global youth population in 2015, numbering 226 million. The United Nations defines youth as people aged 15 to 24 years. By 2030, it is predicted that the number of youths in Africa will have increased by 42%. Africa's population as a whole is very young, with 60% of the entire continent aged below 25, making it the youngest continent in the world, in relation to its population makeup. All of the world's top 10 youngest countries by median age are in Africa, with Niger in first place with a median age of 15.1 years. There is contention among critics and analysts over what this demographic dividend could mean for African nations; some believe that, with effective governance, the economy could significantly benefit and develop, whilst others have argued that a large, poorly managed youth population may lead to greater instability and civil conflict.

A 2004 study found that young people are the most likely to commit violent acts, as well as more likely to become victims of violence themselves. The youths of Africa experience the globalisation of culture in many different forms, such as through fashion and music, including American rap and hip-hop. A further significant issue for Africa's youth population is the prevention, treatment and eradication of disease, with particular reference to HIV/AIDS, which remains a major cause of morbidity and mortality amongst African youths.

== Employment ==
There is a crisis due to lack of formal skilled employment opportunities across Africa, which is exacerbated by the addition of 10–12 million youths to the labour market each year. The demographic dividend in Africa has the potential to become a 'ticking time bomb', as claimed by Ighobor, or to provide great potential for economic development, which is explored by the United Nations Population Fund.

Youth unemployment across Africa is high, at 30.6% in North Africa, the second-highest rate of a region globally, whilst in sub-Saharan Africa, the rate is declining to 12.9% in 2016. Youth unemployment levels vary from 53.6% in Eswatini and 52.3% in South Africa, to 3.3% in Rwanda in 2016. As age within the working population increases, so do levels of employment, as youths are three times more likely to be unemployed than adults (aged 25 or over), which demonstrates an anti-youth bias across African labour markets.

=== Graduate employment ===
Lack of graduate employment opportunities across the continent has contributed towards high levels of informal employment, underemployment and unemployment across university graduates. It is estimated that 600,000 South African graduates are unable to find suitable employment. Many African nations have worked to promote formal skilled graduate employment through schemes such as the Virtual African Higher Education Observatory, which seeks to develop employability skills amongst students, and the National Youth Service in Ghana.

=== Gender ===
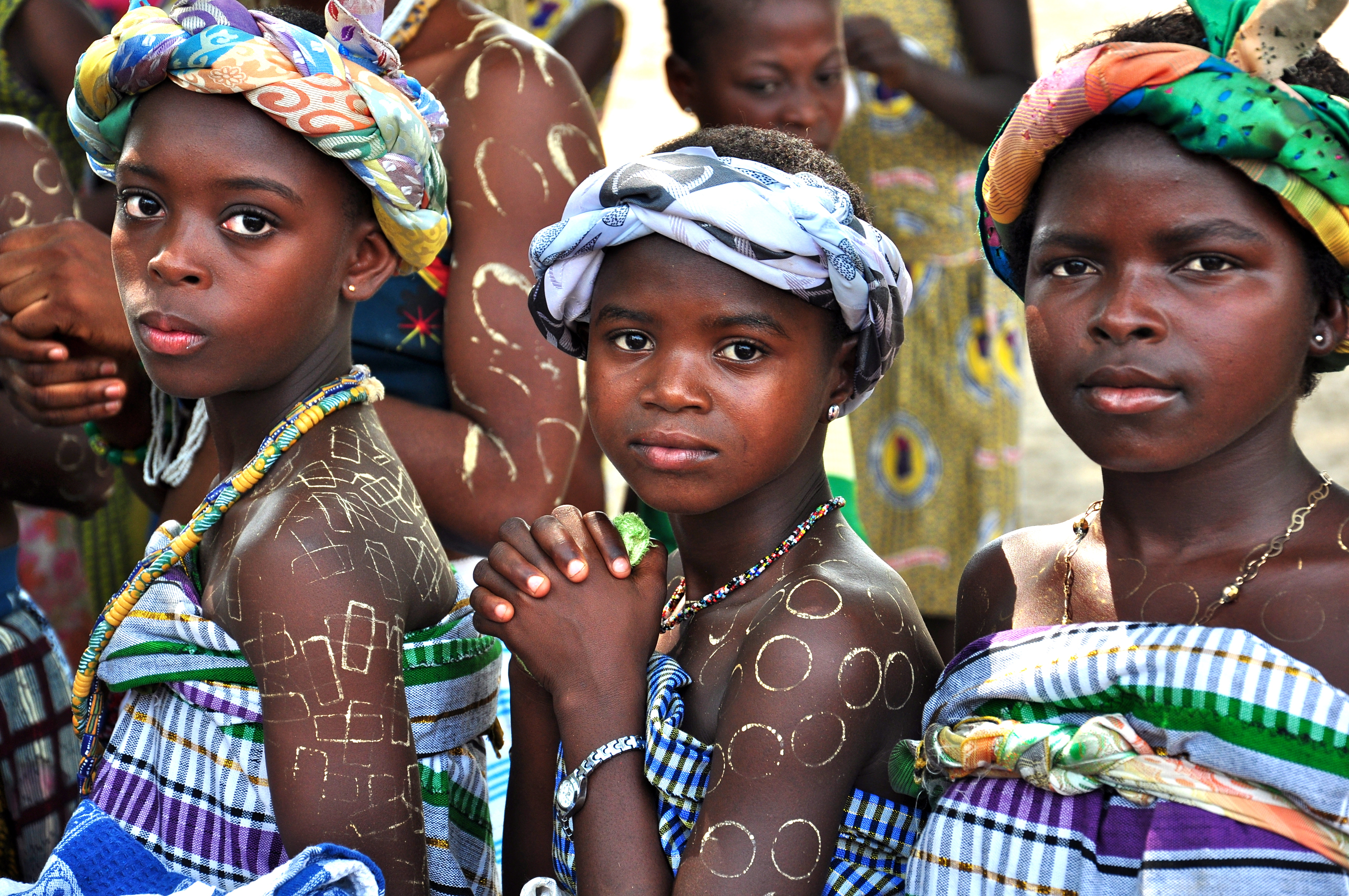
Young women in Ghana

Young women have higher rates of unemployment than men in all African countries, which may potentially result from gender inequalities in primary and secondary education, with only Eswatini achieving gender parity in secondary school enrolment in Africa. In the Central African Republic and Chad, less than half as many girls as boys were enrolled in secondary school in 2012. This takes the foundation for skilled formal employment away from girls, which is further exacerbated by a gender bias in the workplace; women with equivalent skills and experience are five times more likely to struggle gaining employment than men in Kenya. Further issues impacting young women's employment include: child marriage; time poverty through participation in reproductive labour; and laws and customs restricting women's actions and mobilities.

=== Informal economy ===
The informal economy comprises 75% of non-agricultural employment in Africa. This is significantly higher than in other regions, and is discouraged by international corporations such as the World Bank and the International Labour Organisation, as informality is viewed as 'a reflection of underdevelopment,' which may also be 'the source of further economic retardation.' Informal employment may also be damaging on social levels, due to its lack of official regulation, limited social security and poor wages and working conditions.

== Education ==
Despite rising rates of primary school enrollment, African youth face numerous challenges due to disparities in educational access. As of 2026, Sub-Saharan Africa contains roughly 98-100 million children and youth who are not in any kind of formal learning program. UNICEF data from 2021 shows that only 76% of Sub-Saharan African, 80% of Eastern & Southern African, and 72% of West & Central African youth aged 15-24 are literate. These numbers are the lowest of the regional aggregate percentages with the global average being 92%.

African youth face many barriers to accessing and completing secondary education. Sub-Saharan African youth demonstrate high levels of school disengagement and dropout rates due to factors like household poverty, the removal of girls from school for gender-based reasons, exclusion of disabled students, and rural education disparities. Barriers that exist at the primary school level are magnified at the secondary level, including costs, distance to school and the demand for children and adolescents to cook, clean and care for younger children as part of their assigned domestic chores.

This high level of disengagement from school is harmful to youth development. Completion of schooling leads to upward mobility and a higher quality of life but is also important to overall well-being. Educational disengagement may lead to feelings of disonnection, isolation, and worthlessness for African youth. They may feel they are incapable of substantially contributing to various domains of their lives such as family, community, or nation.

Studies show that in countries such as Lesotho or Eswatini, where education is mandatory until the seventh grade, or Zambia, where it is mandatory until the ninth grade, access to post-basic education has been a problem due to the increasing number of students graduating from primary school. In Zimbabwe, the enrollment rate in lower secondary school rose from 74% in 2003 to 92% in 2013, while in Malawi, lower secondary school enrolment increased from 67% in 2005 to 83% in 2015. A growing demand for secondary school is pressuring the system for better content quality and curricula, along with improved infrastructure and accessibility.

== Violence ==
In Africa, 70% of urban residents have been victims of crime, mainly in peacetime, and youths are the most likely to commit, and be victims of, violence and violent acts. However, lack of reliable data collection methods means that little is known about the true extent of youth involvement in violence in Africa.

=== Crisis ===
Cruise-O'Brien (1996) describes African youth as 'the lost generation,' as he argues that the youth-to-adulthood transition has been blocked or stretched, in a position of 'waithood' according to Honwana (2013). Cruise-O'Brien believes this is caused by the failure of states and traditional organisations, who have reneged on their promises to the youth population about the rewards of development. Peters (2012) argues that engaging in violence is seen by many African youths as having more meritocratic opportunities than remaining in a patrimonial system that would exacerbate their marginal status, an example is Cameroon, after the introduction of Structural Adjustment Programs in 1987. However, it must be made clear that not all African youths are in a crisis, but further study is needed into how youths, who do not engage in violence make their own livelihood in a system that is viewed to have failed them.

=== Youth gangs ===
There are many 'gangs' in existence and operation throughout the continent of Africa. One example is The Movement for the Emancipation of the Niger Delta (MEND), who have kidnapped oil workers, attacked oil fields, blown up pipelines and fought against the Nigerian army.

Although these gangs pale in comparison to gangs in America and Europe according to the scale of organized gangs in a Fortune magazine article, they are still gangs that are forming due to lack of opportunities. They mostly prey on people living in low income areas because higher economic status areas usually have very good security. The United Kingdom according to the latest US travel advisory, is a Level 2, similar to countries like Kenya but not Nigeria, which is at Level 3. In most African countries, it is best to avoid extremely congested urban areas near slums or poor infrastructure, where the gangs thrive to be able to make a quick getaway.

Martha Carey (2008) describes how young people in Sierra Leone thwarted in their aspirations by age-based secret societies, corrupt politicians and political systems, and an economy in decline, carried out public amputations to send messages to those in power.

Some gangs in the Niger Delta in Nigeria are financed by politicians to act in their favour during election times, or by protecting their private property. Other gangs, such as the 'Kuluna', a system of organised criminal gangs in Kinshasa, Democratic Republic of the Congo, have formed and taken opportunities themselves.

Moser and McIlwaine (2014) note that: often, the youth population engage in violent gangs for economic reasons, but also to create a sense of identity for themselves in a wider context of social and economic exclusion.

=== Solutions ===
Difficulties in defining the stage at which to intervene has meant that there are few multilateral frameworks to intervene in youth violence in Africa, for example by the United Nations. The United Nations Development Programme, in 2006, suggested that a better informed, holistic framework is urgently needed, investing in young people, their societies and their ability to participate in decision making.

One possible solution is more investment in entrepreneurship and innovation at a high level, by the youth and the governments.

== Culture ==
The globalisation of culture is perhaps nowhere more visible than in the changing nature of the relationship between the world's youth and their sense of identity. Africans are cultivating materialistic and individualistic habits and values previously associated with Western cultures. The swirl of new and modern trends, fashions, ideas and technologies that hit cities first have a strong attraction. Rural youth, not wanting to be viewed as backward or bushy, adopt incoming trends as well.

=== Hip-hop culture ===
Liberalisation was central in providing Africa's youth with exposure and access to rap music, as it allowed easier access to foreign goods and services, including hip-hop clothing, music, and magazines. In the mid-1980s, clubs in Accra were playing American rappers such as LL Cool J, Heavy D, Public Enemy, and later in the 1990s, Tupac Shakur and the Notorious B.I.G.

=== Tanzania ===
The CCM (Chama Cha Mapinduzi) government introduced political and economic liberalisation in the late 1980s and early 1990s. Tanzanian youth and young adults incorporated various musical and textual (as well as visual) elements from local and foreign reggae and hip-hop when shaping their contemporary identities. These musically mediated identifications tie Tanzanian youths to young generations in Jamaica and the USA. Weiss (2009) identifies barbershops in urban Tanzania as sites of the struggle to earn a living amid economic crisis. With names like Brooklyn Barber House and Boyz II Men, these workplaces are also nodes in an explosion of popular culture that appropriates images drawn from the global circulation of hip-hop music, fashion, and celebrity.

In urban Tanzania, rap has become a central means for youths to teach others about joblessness, corruption, class differences, HIV/AIDS, and other issues. Located at the heart of both analytical apparatuses and political action, young people have become a preoccupation of politicians. Suriano (2007) highlights the fact that during the last CCM general electoral campaign in 2005, Jakaya Kikwete (Tanzanian President 2005–2015) was accompanied by young Hip-Hop and Bongo Flava artists in order to entertain, attract and deliver the new party slogan to the crowd more effectively.

=== Youth languages ===
Youths in several urban centres on the African continent are continuously creating their own languages in order to set themselves apart from the older generations. Young artists often contribute towards the spread of new terms, such as 'Sheng slang' words (a combination of Swahili and English).

== Health ==
HIV/AIDS is a major cause of death amongst youth in Africa, particularly young women, who are more vulnerable to contracting HIV than young men in the same location and circumstances. Other diseases, such as tuberculosis (TB) and malaria, are also in the top five causes of mortality among the youth population.

=== HIV/AIDS ===
The prevalence of HIV/AIDS amongst the youth population in Sub-Saharan Africa varies greatly both within and between countries. In 2009, 20 countries in Sub-Saharan Africa accounted for an estimated 69% of the world's new HIV infections among young people, with an estimated 4.3% of young women and 1.5% of young men in the region living with HIV. In Eastern and Southern Africa, 11.9% of the population living with HIV are aged 15–24, with 710,000 South African youths, the largest youth population of any African country, living with HIV/AIDS.

=== Prevention programmes ===
It is suggested that health behaviour interventions carried out in everyday places, such as schools and 'camps', could result in increased effectiveness in reducing the number of young people affected by HIV, rather than if schemes were carried out in specialist health facilities.

In Tanzania, young people make up 60% of the country's new HIV infectious, and considering that 38% of youths are neither employed or in education, 'camps' are where young people engage in HIV 'risk behaviour' to the greatest extent. Yamanis et al. (2010) applied the therapeutic landscapes framework to examine how 'camps' influenced HIV risk behaviour among young men in Tanzanian urban areas. They found that these 'camps' can be simultaneously both health and risk producing.

Many of these prevention programmes are targeted at the youth population since they are perceived to be the 'Window of Hope' in many African countries, however many are also targeted unfairly at women. Faria (2008) suggests that amongst campaigns that promote abstinence as a way of preventing HIV, young women are directed to take responsibility, whilst attention is taken away from the sexual activity, and associated risky behaviour, of young men.

=== Mental health ===
The World Health Organisation (WHO) has attempted to raise the profile of youth mental health through its Mental Health Gap Action Plan. There was a push to include mental health in the Millennium Development Goals. In most Sub-Saharan African countries, there is no clear pathway to access treatment, and mental illness retains an extent of stigmatisation, as is evidenced through the limited and substandard mental health facilities throughout the region. Further, youth in some rural parts of Africa experience high rates of emotional distress and suicidality.

== Sources ==
This article incorporates text from a free content work. Licensed under CC BY-SA 3.0 IGO. Text taken from Youth and changing realities: perspectives from Southern Africa, UNESCO, Ahmimed, Charaf, UNESCO. UNESCO.
