= Alcinda Honwana =

Mozambican anthropologist

Alcinda Manuel Honwana
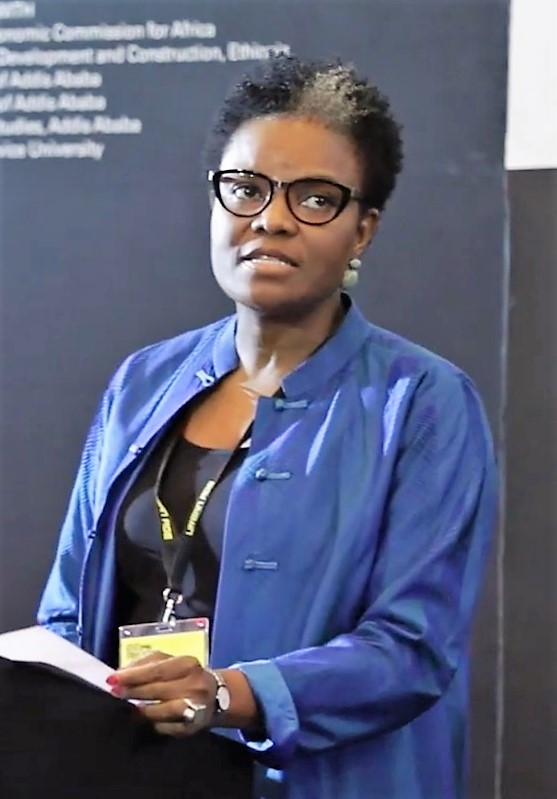
- Honwana in 2018
- Born: 1962 (age 63–64); Mozambique

Academic background
- Education: SOAS University of London (PhD); University of Paris (MA); Eduardo Mondlane University (BA)
- Thesis: Spiritual agency & self-renewal in southern Mozambique (1996)

Academic work
- Institutions: London School of Economics; Open University; University of Cape Town

Alcinda Manuel Honwana (born 1962) is a Mozambican anthropologist who is a Centennial Professor and the Strategic Director of the Firoz Lalji Institute for Africa at the London School of Economics and Political Science. Her research considers young people, social movements, political protests and social change. She served as a Senior Adviser for the United Nations in the Department of Economic and Social Affairs.

== Early life and education ==
Honwana was born in Mozambique. She completed her undergraduate studies in 1983 at the Eduardo Mondlane University, specialising in history and geography. She moved to Paris for her graduate studies, working toward a master's degree (maîtrise) in sociology at the University of Paris VIII. For her doctoral studies, Honwana moved to the United Kingdom, joining SOAS University of London to study social anthropology. Her early research considered post-war healing and social reintegration in Mozambique.

== Research and experience ==
After completing her doctorate in 1996, Honwana was appointed a Senior Lecturer at the University of Cape Town. She served on the board of the Council for the Development of Social Science Research in Africa from 1998 to 2002. In New York she worked for the United Nations Office for Children and Armed Conflict led by Olara Otunnu. Honwana then became a Program Director at the Social Science Research Council in New York and held a visiting position at The New School for Social Research teaching a graduate course in Anthropology. She joined the Board of the African Studies Association in the US and acted as an adviser for the United Nations. In 2005 Honwana moved to the United Kingdom, where she was made Chair of International Development at the Open University and served as visiting professor of Anthropology and International Development. There she further developed her studies on youth politics and youth transitions adopting the term waithood, which describes the prolonged period of time African children face between childhood and adulthood. For Honwana, waithood is a period in which young people are “no longer children but not yet independent adults ... it is a precarious but also a very dynamic period in young people's lives”. Honwana has argued that youth protest movements arise from their experiences of socioeconomic and political marginalisation. In her view, the challenge for youth protest movements has often been how to translate their aspirations beyond the street demonstrations into formal political agendas and governance action. She was made the 2007 Prince Claus Chair for Development and Equity at Institute of Social Studies and Utrecht University in the Netherlands. She delivered a TED talk in London in 2012, where she discussed how young people in Africa can be key drivers for socioeconomic and political change. She then delivered a lecture in Portugal at the fifth European Conference on African Studies (ECAS 5) under the theme African dynamics in a multipolar world in 2013. She famously reiterated this lecture during the International African Institute (IAI) Lugard Lecture in 2013.

Honwana was appointed to the London School of Economics and Political Science in 2019, where she was made a Centennial Professor and the Strategic Director at LSE's Firoz Lalji Centre for Africa. Here she has led calls to decolonise the academy and to create space for new epistemologies. In 2018 Honwana delivered the Kapuscinski Development Lecture of the United Nations Development Programme, where she discussed the politics of African youth migration and social change. Alcinda Honwana received an Honorary Doctorate from Utrecht University in 2021 for her contributions to the study of youth in Africa and for bridging academic research with policymaking.

In late 2022, Honwana was appointed the Director of the Anti-Racism Team (ART) in the Department of Management, Strategy, Policy, and Compliance (DMSPC). Now called the Anti-Racism Office (ARO), their mission is to guide the UN Secretariat in combating racism by supervising and integrating the Strategic Action Plan on Addressing Racism and Promoting Dignity for All (SAP). SAP aims to battle all manners of racism by addressing prejudice and discrimination in all forms across many contexts.

In Honwana's first year serving as Director of the ARO, the global Secretariat introduced 180 Anti-Racism Advocates (ARAs) into their network. The advocates role is to create, reinforce, and promote anti-racism actions throughout the Secretariat. The ARO has collaborated with similar anti-racism focused groups including the UN Asian Network for Diversity and Inclusion (UN-ANDI), and the UN Peoples of African Descent (UNPAD).

== Selected publications ==
=== Books ===
- Honwana, Alcinda. (2012). The time of youth: work, social change, and politics in Africa. Lynne Rienner Publishers. ISBN 978-1-56549-471-8. OCLC 862746455.
- Honwana, Alcinda. (2006). Child Soldiers in Africa. University of Pennsylvania Press. ISBN 978-0-8122-0477-3. OCLC 956784852.
- Honwana, Alcinda. (2013). Youth and Revolution in Tunisia. Zed Books. ISBN 978-1-299-71775-6. OCLC 851696014.
- Honwana, Alcinda; De Boeck, Filip (2005). Makers & Breakers: Children and Youth in Postcolonial Africa. Oxford: James Currey. ISBN 0-85255-433-8. OCLC 56913029.
- Honwana, Alcinda (2013). Youth and revolution in Tunisia. Bloomsbury Publishing. ISBN 9781780324630.

=== Journals ===
- Honwana, Alcinda (2000). "Innocent and guilty: Child soldiers as interstitial and tactical agents". Politique africaine. 80 (4): 55–78.
- Honwana, Alcinda (1997). "Healing for Peace: Traditional Healers and Post-War Reconstruction in Southern Mozambique". Peace and Conflict. 3 (3): 293–305.
