= East African =

East African may refer to:

- Any person or object of, or pertaining to, East Africa
- East African Safari Air, an airline based in Kenya, now trading as Fly-SAX
- The EastAfrican, a weekly newspaper in East Africa
