= Ethiopid race =

Outdated grouping of human beings

Ethiopid (also spelled Aethiopid) (Note: Also called Erythriote or Eastern Hamitic) is an outdated racial classification of humans indigenous to Northeast Africa, who were typically classified as part of the Caucasian race – the Hamitic sub-branch, or in rare instances the Negroid race. The racial classification was mainly made up of the Afroasiatic-speaking populations of the Horn of Africa, but to an extent included certain Nilo-Saharan populations of the Nile Valley and the Great Lakes region.

== Center of distribution ==
According to John Baker (1974), in their stable form, their center of distribution was considered to be the Horn of Africa, among that region's Hamito-Semitic-speaking populations. Baker described them as being of medium height, with a dolicocephalic or mesocephalic skull (see cephalic index), an essentially Caucasoid facial form, an orthognathic profile (no prognathism) and a rather prominent, narrow nose, often ringlety hair, and an invariably brown skin, with either a reddish or blackish tinge.

== Dividing humankind into races ==
The concept of dividing humankind into three races called Caucasoid, Mongoloid, and Negroid (originally named "Ethiopian") was introduced in the 1780s by members of the Göttingen school of history and further developed by Western scholars in the context of racist ideologies during the age of colonialism.

== Obsolescence in modern genetics ==
With the rise of modern genetics, the concept of distinct human races in a biological sense has become obsolete. In 2019, the American Association of Biological Anthropologists stated: "Race does not provide an accurate representation of human biological variation. It was never accurate in the past, and it remains inaccurate when referencing contemporary human populations."
