= Negroid =

Outdated grouping of human beings

Negroid (less commonly called Congoid) is an obsolete racial grouping of various people indigenous to Africa south of the area which stretched from the southern Sahara desert in the west to the African Great Lakes in the southeast, but also to isolated parts of South and Southeast Asia (Negritos). The term is derived from since-disproven conceptions of race as a biological category.

The concept of dividing humans into three races called Caucasoid, Mongoloid, and Negroid (originally named "Ethiopian") was introduced in the 1780s by members of the Göttingen school of history and further developed by Western scholars in the context of "racist ideologies" during the age of colonialism.

With the rise of modern genetics, the concept of distinct human races in a biological sense has become obsolete. In 2019, the American Association of Biological Anthropologists stated: "Race does not provide an accurate representation of human biological variation. It was never accurate in the past, and it remains inaccurate when referencing contemporary human populations."

== Etymology ==
Negroid has Portuguese or Spanish and Ancient Greek etymological roots. It literally translates as "black resemblance" from the Portuguese and Spanish word negro (black) from Latin nigrum, and Greek οειδές -oeidēs, equivalent to -o- + είδες -eidēs "having the appearance of", derivative of είδος eîdos "appearance". The earliest recorded use of the term "Negroid" came in 1844.

== History of the concept ==
=== Origins ===
Johann Friedrich Blumenbach, a scholar at the then modern Göttingen University developed a concept dividing mankind into five races in the revised 1795 edition of his De generis humani varietate nativa (On the Natural Variety of Mankind). Although Blumenbach's concept later gave rise to scientific racism, his arguments were basically anti-racist, since he underlined that mankind as a whole forms one single species, and points out that the transition from one race to another is so gradual that the distinctions between the races presented by him are "very arbitrary". Blumenbach counts the inhabitants of North Africa among the "Caucasian race", grouping the other Africans as "Ethiopian race". In this context, he names the "Abyssinians" and "Moors" as peoples through which the "Ethiopian race" gradually "flows together" with the "Caucasian race".

=== In the context of scientific racism ===
==== Before Darwin ====
The development of Western race theories took place in a historical situation where most Western nations were still profiting from the enslavement of Africans and therefore had an economical interest in portraying the inhabitants of sub-Saharan Africa as an inferior race. A significant change in Western views on Africans came about when Napoleon's 1798 invasion of Egypt drew attention to the impressive achievements of Ancient Egypt, which could hardly be reconciled with the theory of Africans being inferior. In this context, many of the works published on Egypt after Napoleon's expedition "seemed to have had as their main purpose an attempt to prove in some way that the Egyptians were not Negroes", but belonged to a "Hamitic race", which was seen as a subgroup of the "Caucasian race". Thus the high civilization of Ancient Egypt could be separated from the allegedly inferior African "race".

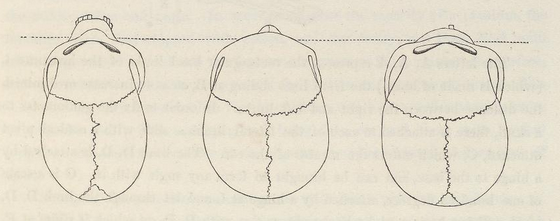
Illustration of Negroid, Caucasoid, and Mongoloid skulls shown from above (Samuel George Morton, 1839)

As historian Edith Sanders writes, "Perhaps because slavery was both still legal and profitable in the United States ... there arose an American school of anthropology which attempted to prove scientifically that the Egyptian was a Caucasian, far removed from the inferior Negro". In his Crania Aegyptiaca (1844), Samuel George Morton, the founder of anthropology in the United States, analyzed over a hundred intact crania gathered from the Nile Valley, and concluded that the ancient Egyptians were racially akin to Europeans.

Discussions on race among Western scholars during the 19th century took place against the background of the debate between monogenists and polygenists, the former arguing for a single origin of all mankind, the latter holding that each human race had a specific origin. Monogenists based their arguments either on a literal interpretation of the biblical story of Adam and Eve or on secular research. Since polygenism stressed the perceived differences, it was popular among white supremacists, especially slaveholders in the US.

Through craniometry conducted on thousands of human skulls, Morton argued that the differences between the races were too broad to have stemmed from a single common ancestor, but were instead consistent with separate racial origins. In Crania Aegyptiaca, he reported his measurements of internal skull capacity grouped according to Blumenbach's five races, finding that the average capacity of the "Caucasian race" was at the top, and that "Ethiopian" skulls had the smallest capacity, with the other "races" ranging in between. He concluded that the "Ethiopian race" was inferior in terms of intelligence. Upon his death in 1851, when slavery still existed in the southern United States, the influential Charleston Medical Journal praised him with the words: "We of the South should consider him as our benefactor for aiding most materially in giving to the negro his true position as an inferior race." While a controversy about the correctness of Morton's measurements has been going on since the late 1970s, modern scientists agree that the volume of the skull and intelligence are not related.

==== In the age of evolutionary biology ====
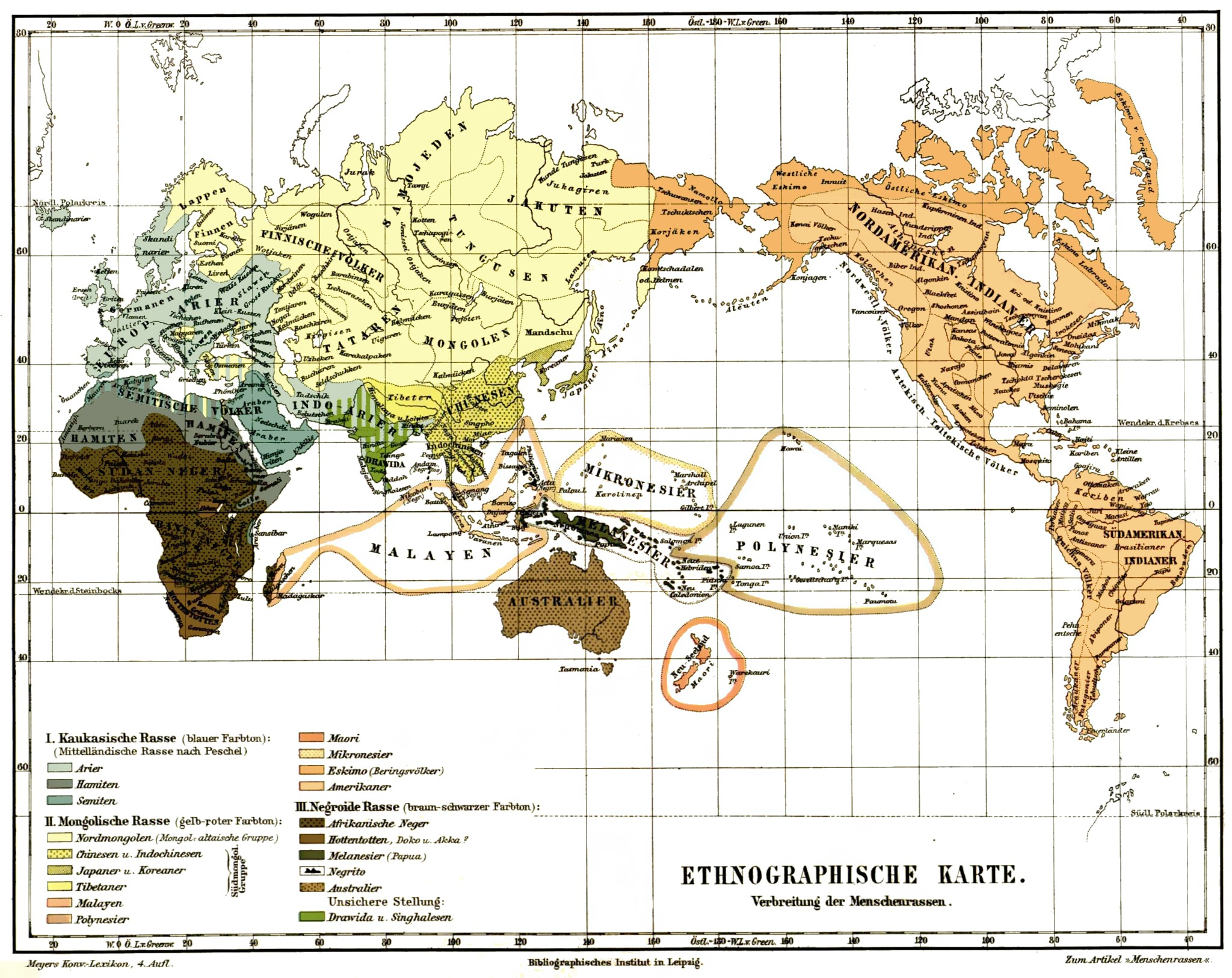
Meyers Konversations-Lexikon (1885–1890) ethnographic map: Caucasoid: Aryan Semitic Hamitic Negroid: African Negro Khoikhoi Melanesian Negrito Australoid Uncertain: Dravida & Sinhalese / Mongoloid: North Mongol Chinese & Indochinese Korean & Japanese Tibetan & Burmese Malay Polynesian Maori Micronesian Eskimo / Inuit American

Darwin's landmark work On the Origin of Species, published in 1859, eight years after Morton's death, significantly changed scientific discourse on the origin of humans. British biologist Thomas Huxley, a strong advocate of Darwinism and a monogenist, counted ten "modifications of mankind", dividing the native populations of sub-Saharan Africa into the "Bushmen" of the Cape region and the "Negroes" of the central areas of the continent.

By the end of the 19th century, the influential German encyclopaedia, Meyers Konversations-Lexikon, divided humanity into three major races called Caucasoid, Mongoloid, and Negroid, each comprising various sub-races. While the "Hamites" of northern Africa were seen as Caucasoid, "Australians", "Melanesians", and "Negritoes" were seen as Negroid sub-races, although living outside the African continent. The only sub-races attributed to Africa were the "African Negroes" and the "Hottentots".

The justification for racist Jim Crow laws was provided by pseudo-scientific opinions on "negro" psychology like those expressed by the entry for "Negro" in the Encyclopædia Britannica, 11th edition (1910–1911):

"Mentally the negro is inferior to the white ... the arrest or even deterioration of mental development [after adolescence] is no doubt very largely due to the fact that after puberty sexual matters take the first place in the negro's life and thoughts. ... the mental constitution of the negro is very similar to that of a child, normally good-natured and cheerful, but subject to sudden fits of emotion and passion during which he is capable of performing acts of singular atrocity, impressionable, vain, but often exhibiting in the capacity of servant a dog-like fidelity which has stood the supreme test."

==== Franz Boas and The Race Question ====
Since the 1920s, Franz Boas and his school of anthropology at Columbia University were criticising the concept of race as politically dangerous and scientifically useless because of its vague definition.

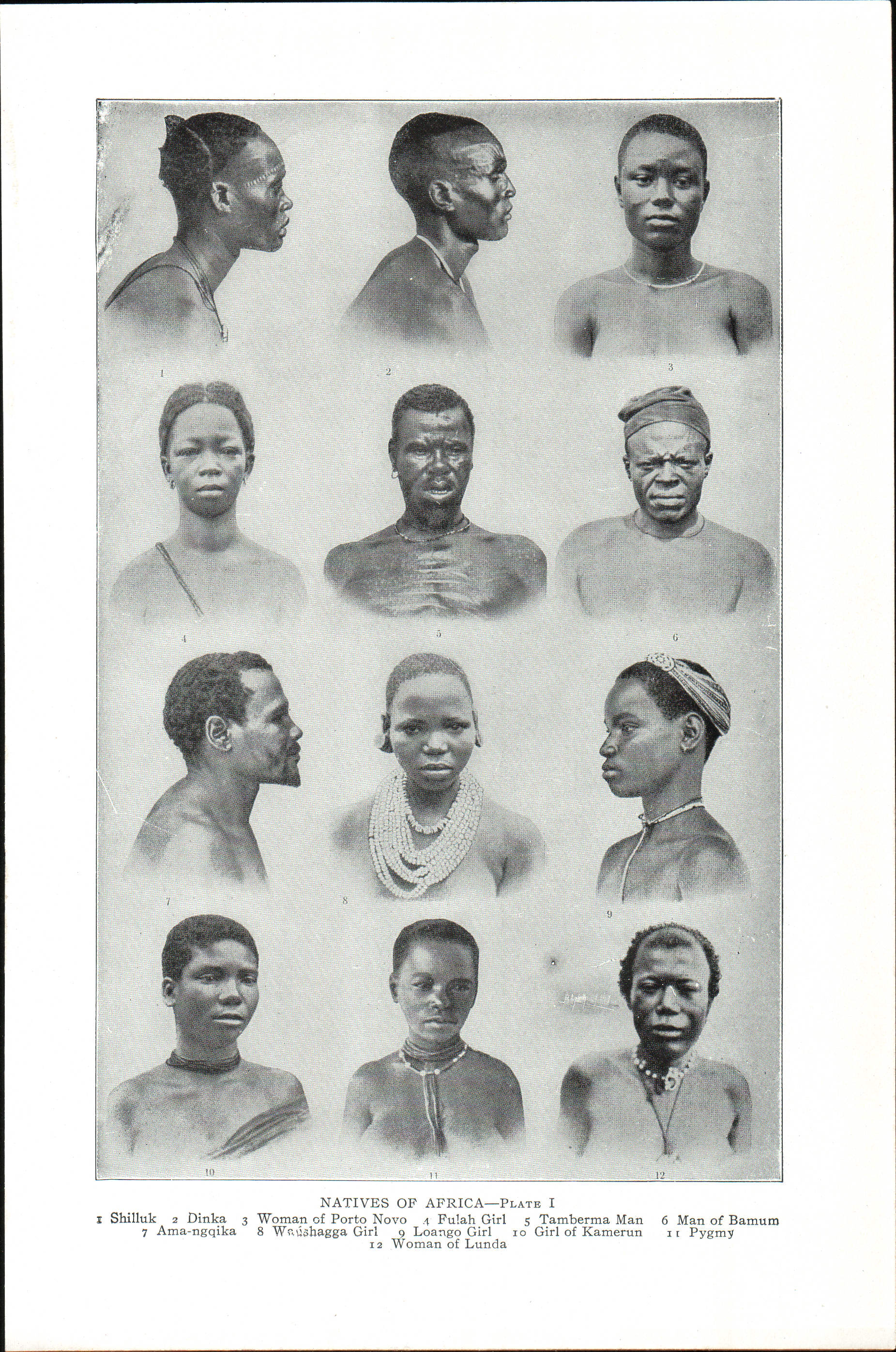
Illustrations of "racial types" from The New Student's Reference Work (1914), edited by Chandler B. Beach and Frank Morton McMurry

In 1950, UNESCO published their statement The Race Question. It condemned all forms of racism, naming "the doctrine of inequality of men and races" among the causes of World War II and proposing to replace the term "race" with "ethnic groups" because "serious errors ... are habitually committed when the term "race" is used in popular parlance."

==== Carleton Coon ====
American anthropologist Carleton S. Coon published his much debated Origin of Races in 1962. Coon divided the species Homo sapiens into five groups: Besides the Caucasoid, Mongoloid, and Australoid races, he posited two races among the indigenous populations of sub-Saharan Africa: the Capoid race (named for the Cape of Good Hope) in the south, and the Congoid race. In 1982, he used Negroid and Congoid as synonyms.

Coon's thesis was that Homo erectus had already been divided into five different races or subspecies. "Homo Erectus then evolved into Homo Sapiens not once but five times, as each subspecies, living in its own territory, passed a critical threshold from a more brutal to a more sapient state." He thought the Caucasoid race had passed the threshold to Homo sapiens about 200,000 years earlier than the Negroid race, thus giving segregationists in the southern US the opportunity to make political use of his thesis in their fight against the civil rights movement. Although Coon publicly assumed a neutral stance regarding segregation, some fellow anthropologists accused him of being racist because of his "clear insensitivity to social issues". In private conversations and correspondence with his cousin Carleton Putnam, a prominent supporter of white supremacy, he went much further, helping Putnam "hone his arguments against integration".

Coon's evolutionary approach was criticized on the basis that such sorting criteria generally do not produce meaningful results, and that evolutionary divergence was extremely improbable over the given time-frames. Monatagu (1963) argued that Coon's theory on the speciation of Congoids and other Homo sapiens was unlikely because the transmutation of one species to another was a markedly gradual process.

Since Coon followed the traditional methods of physical anthropology, relying on morphological characteristics, and not on the emerging genetics to classify humans, the debate over Origin of Races has been "viewed as the last gasp of an outdated scientific methodology that was soon to be supplanted".

=== Cheikh Anta Diop and "Negroid" primacy ===
Afrocentrist author Cheikh Anta Diop contrasted "Negroid" with "Cro-Magnoid" in his publications arguing for "Negroid" primacy. Grimaldi Man, Upper Paleolithic fossils found in Italy in 1901, had been classified as Negroid by Boule and Vallois (1921). The identification was obsolete by the 1960s, but was controversially revived by Diop in his work, "The African Origin of Civilizations" in 1974 and republished in 1989.

== Physical features ==
=== General appearance ===
The Encyclopædia Britannica, Eleventh Edition (1910–1911), lists the following "well-defined characteristics" of the "Negroid" populations of Africa, southern India, Malaysia, and Australasia: "A dark skin, varying from dark brown, reddish-brown, or chocolate to nearly black; dark, tightly curled hair, flat in traverse section, of the woolly or the frizzly type; a greater or less tendency to prognathism; eyes dark brown with yellowish cornea; nose more or less broad and flat; and large teeth". The Encyclopædia Britannica sees a tendency towards a "tall stature" and "dolichocephaly" (long-headedness), with the exception of the Negritos who are described as showing "short stature" and "brachycephaly" (short-headedness).

Forensic anthropologists writing around the turn of the millennium described "Negroid" skulls as having a broad and round nasal cavity; no dam or nasal sill; Quonset hut-shaped nasal bones; notable facial projection in the jaw and mouth area (prognathism); a rectangular-shaped palate; a square or rectangular eye orbit shape; a large interorbital distance; a more undulating supraorbital ridge; and large teeth.

=== Neoteny ===
Ashley Montagu lists "neotenous structural traits in which ... Negroids [generally] differ from Caucasoids ... flattish nose, flat root of the nose, narrower ears, narrower joints, frontal skull eminences, later closure of premaxillary sutures, less hairy, longer eyelashes, [and] cruciform pattern of second and third molars." He also suggested that in the extinct Negroid group termed the "Boskopoids", pedomorphic traits proceeded further than in other Negroids. Additionally, Montagu wrote that the Boskopoids had larger brains than modern humans (1,700 cubic centimeters cranial capacity compared to 1,400 cubic centimeters in modern-day humans), and the projection of their mouth was less than in other Negroids. He believed the Boskopoids were the ancestors of the Khoisan.

=== Athleticism ===
In the context of prominent successes of African-American athletes like Jesse Owens during the 1936 Summer Olympics, the speed advantage of the "Negroid type of calf, foot and heel bone" was discussed. Black Anthropologist W. Montague Cobb joined the debate in the same year, pointing out that "there is not a single physical characteristic, including skin color, which all the Negro stars have in common which definitely classify them as Negroes." Today, suggestions of biological differences in athletic ability between racial groups are considered unscientific.

== Criticism ==
The Oxford Dictionary of English states: "The term Negroid belongs to a set of terms introduced by 19th-century anthropologists attempting to categorize human races. Such terms are associated with outdated notions of racial types, and so are now potentially offensive and best avoided."

=== Criticism based on modern genetics ===
In his 2016 essay Evolution and Notions of Human Race, Alan R. Templeton discusses various criteria used in biology to define subspecies or races. His examples for traits traditionally considered to be racial include skin colour: "[T]he native peoples with the darkest skins live in tropical Africa and Melanesia." While those two groups would traditionally be classified as "black", in reality Africans are more closely related to Europeans than to Melanesians. Another example is malarial resistance, which is often found in African populations, but also in "many European and Asian populations".

Templeton concludes: "[T]he answer to the question whether races exist in humans is clear and unambiguous: no."
