= Snout =

Extended part of an animal's mouth

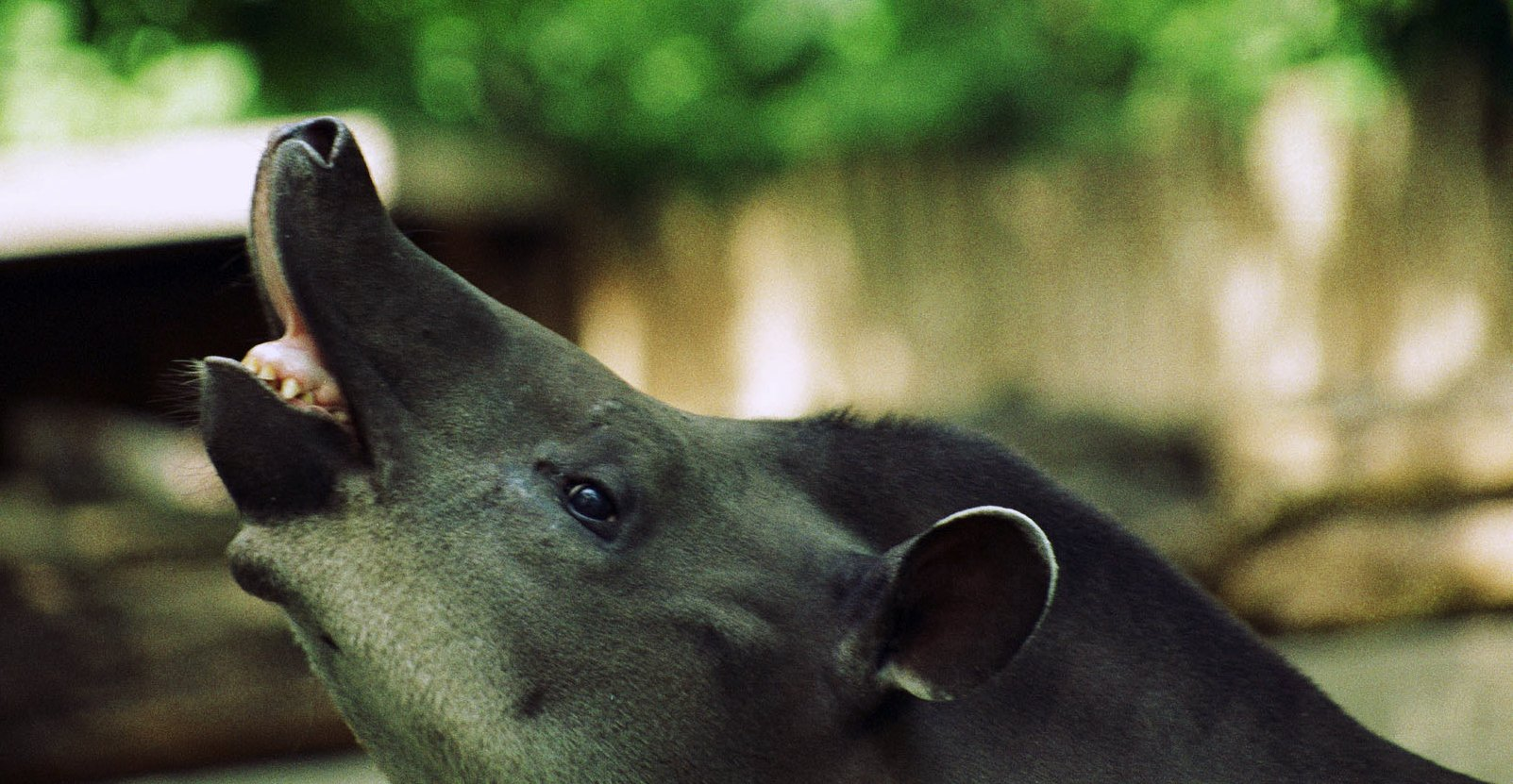
Tapir (Tapirus terrestris) snout showing flehmen

A snout is the protruding portion of an animal's face, consisting of its nose, mouth, and jaw. In many animals, the structure is called a muzzle, rostrum, beak, trunk or proboscis. A dog's snout is sometimes colloquially referred to as a snoot. The wet furless surface around the nostrils of the nose of many mammals is called the rhinarium (colloquially this is the "cold wet snout" of some mammals). The rhinarium is often associated with a stronger sense of olfaction.

== Variation ==
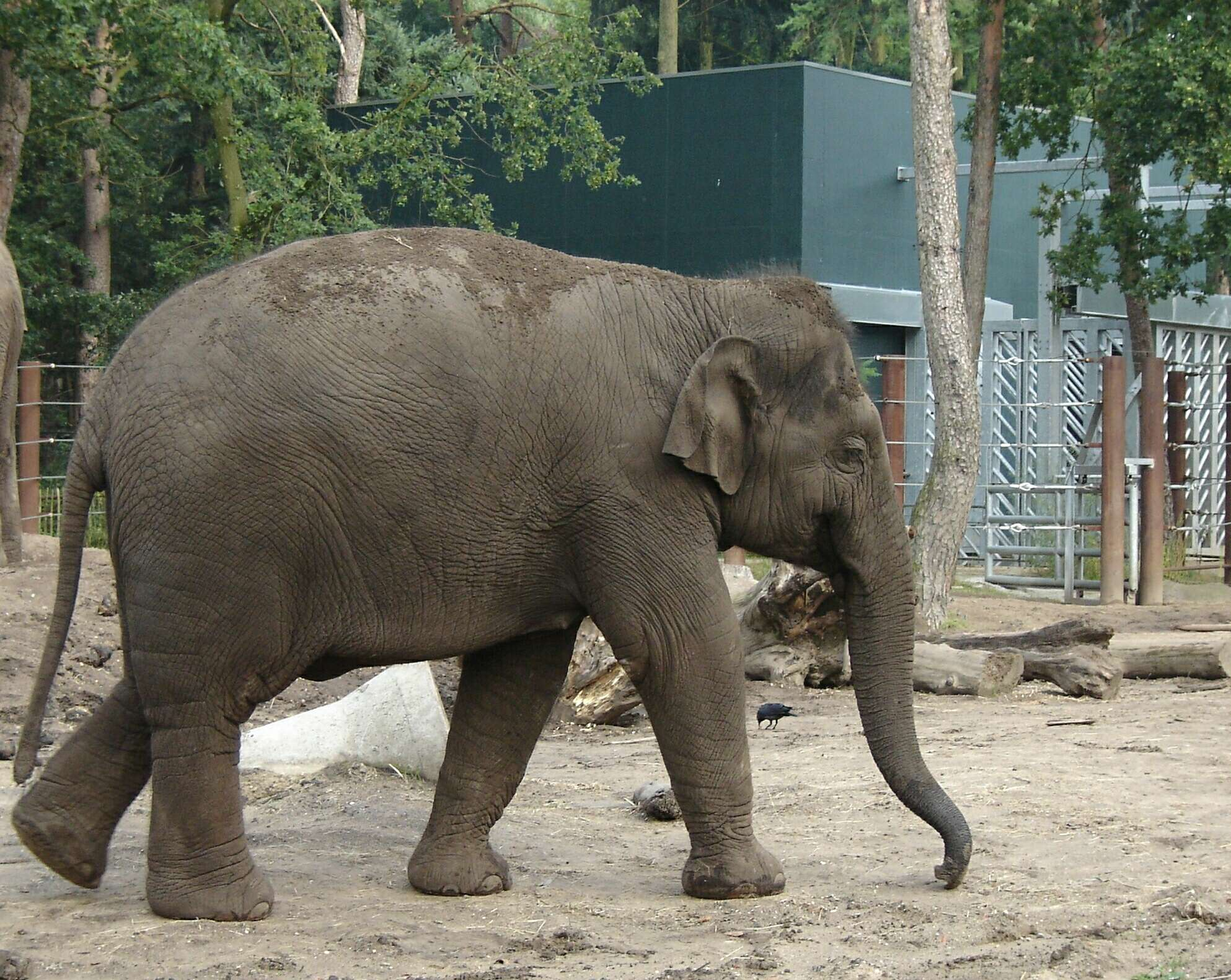
Asian elephant (Elephas maximus indicus). The extended proboscis is called the "trunk" and is used for a wide range of purposes, including eating, drinking, exploration, and social grooming.

Snouts are found on many mammals in a variety of shapes. Some animals, including ursines and great cats, have box-like snouts, while others, like shrews, have pointed snouts. Pig snouts are flat and cylindrical.

=== Primates ===
Strepsirrhine primates have muzzles, as do baboons. Great apes have reduced muzzles, with the exception being human beings, whose face does not have protruding jaws nor a snout but merely a human nose.

=== Dogs ===
The muzzle begins at the stop, just below the eyes, and includes the dog's nose and mouth. In the domestic dog, most of the upper muzzle contains organs for detecting scents. The loose flaps of skin on the sides of the upper muzzle that hang to different lengths over the mouth are called 'flews'.

The muzzle is innervated by one of the twelve pairs of cranial nerves, which start in the brain and emerge through the skull to their target organs. Other destinations of these nerves are the eyeballs, teeth and tongue.

The muzzle shape of a domestic dog ranges in shape depending upon the breed, from extremely long and thin (dolichocephalic), as in the Rough Collie, to nearly nonexistent because it is so flat (extreme brachycephalic), as in the pug. Some breeds, such as many sled dogs and spitz types, have muzzles that somewhat resemble the original wolf's in size and shape, and others in the less extreme range have shortened it somewhat (mesocephalic) as in many hounds.

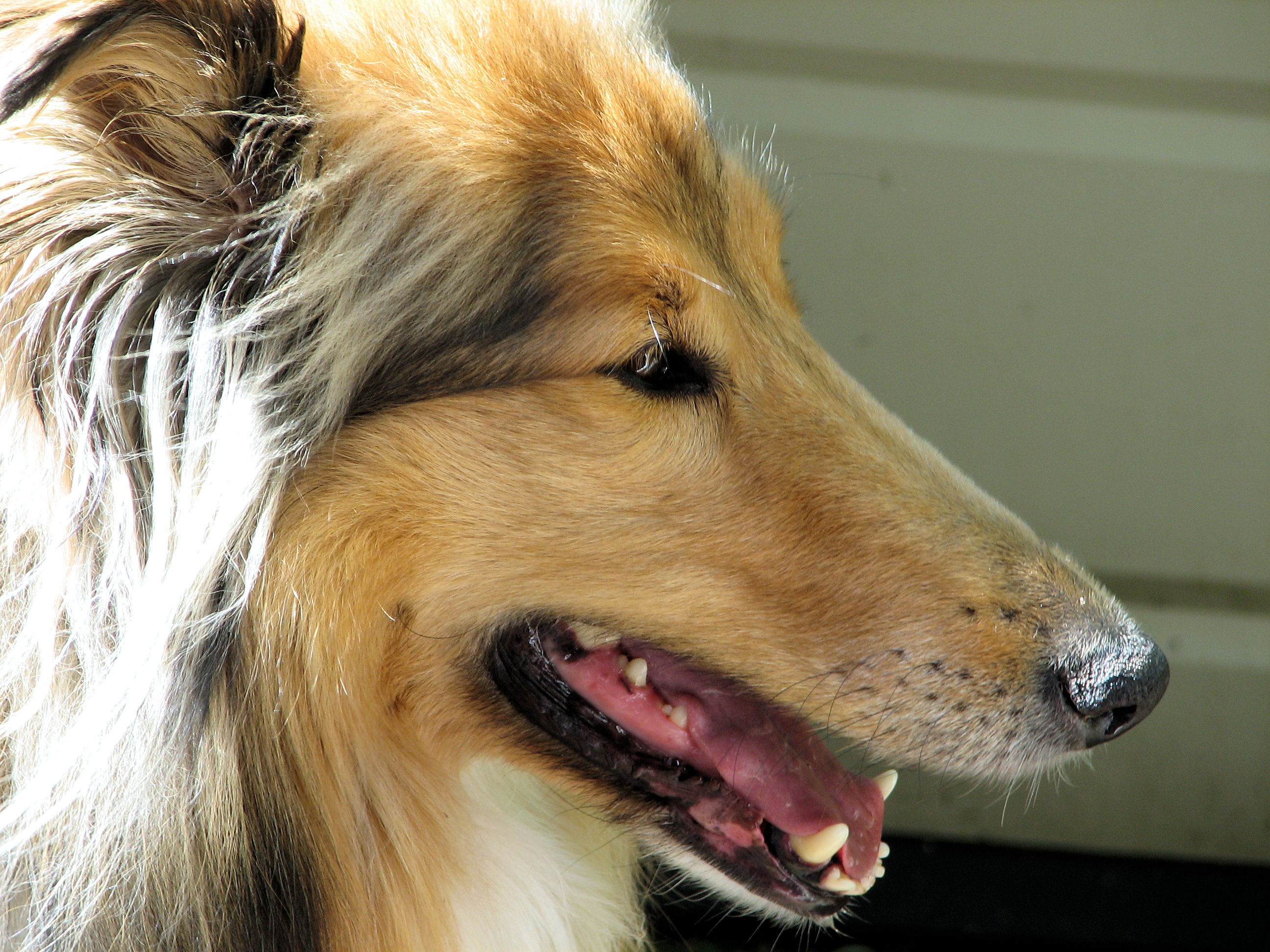
Dolichocephalic (long and thin snout): Rough Collie

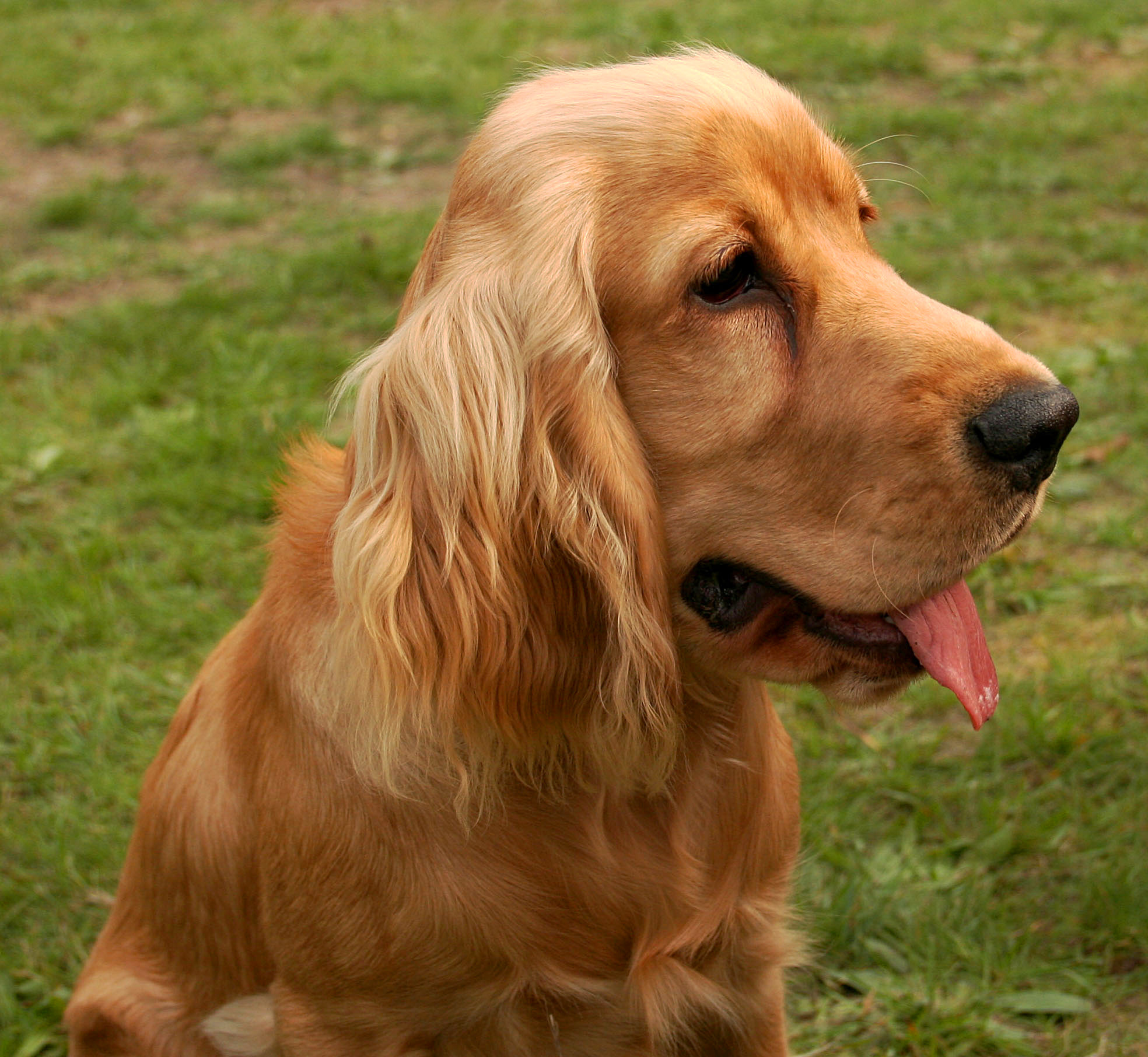
Mesocephalic (medium length snout): English Cocker Spaniel

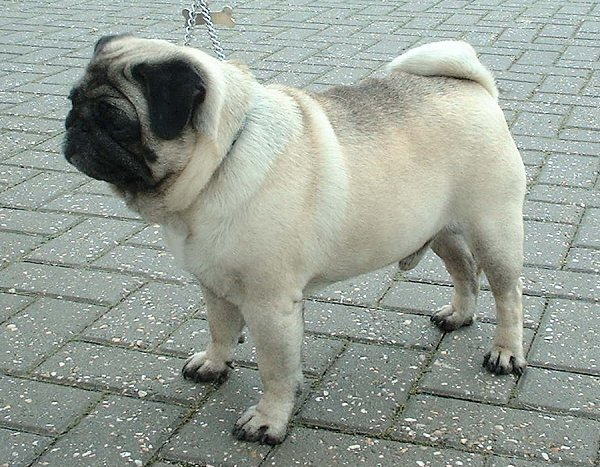
Brachycephalic (extremely flat snout): Pug

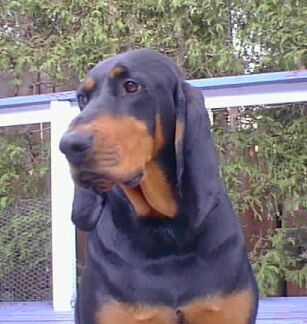
The flews of the Black and Tan Coonhound overhang the lower jaw.
