= Brachycephaly =

Short, broad head

- Other names: Brachycephalic
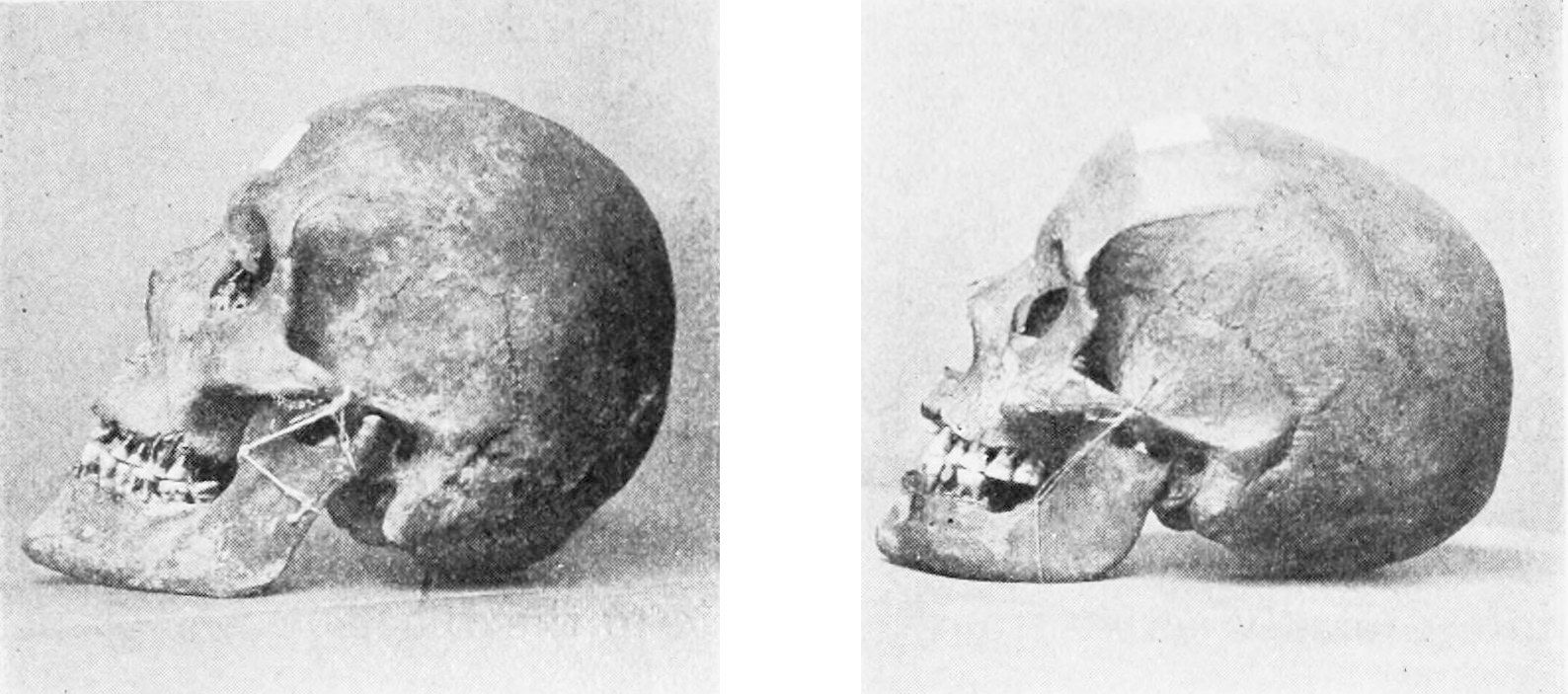
- Brachycephaly and dolichocephaly
- Specialty: Medical genetics

Brachycephaly (from Ancient Greek βραχύς, brakhús, meaning "short", and κεφαλή, kephalḗ, meaning "head") is the shape of a skull shorter than average in its species. It is perceived as a cosmetically desirable trait in some domesticated dog and cat breeds, notably the pug and Persian, and can be normal or abnormal in other animal species.

In humans, brachycephaly can appear both pathologically and non-pathologically as a result of normal human variation. It is particularly common in Mongolians and the Andamanese. A 2026 systematic review found brachycephalic or hyperbrachycephalic averages in several Himalayan, Iranian, East Asian and admixed Brazilian populations. It also found that many populations underwent progressive brachycephalization during the 20th century, partly reversed in Korean cohorts born after about 1965–1970.

In anthropology, human populations have been characterized as either dolichocephalic (long-headed), mesocephalic (moderate-headed), or brachycephalic (short-headed). The usefulness of the cephalic index was questioned by Giuseppe Sergi, who argued that cranial morphology provided a better means to model racial ancestry.

When pathological, it is known as flat head syndrome, and it results from premature fusion of the coronal sutures, or from external deformation. The coronal suture is the fibrous joint that unites the frontal bone with the two parietal bones of the skull. The parietal bones form the top and sides of the skull. This feature can also be a symptom of Down syndrome.

There are also cases of brachycephaly associated with plagiocephaly. Brachycephaly with plagiocephaly is positional and has become more prevalent since the "Back to Sleep" campaign. The Back to Sleep campaign began in 1994 as a way to educate parents about ways to reduce the risk for sudden infant death syndrome (SIDS). The campaign was named for its recommendation to place healthy babies on their backs to sleep. Placing babies on their backs to sleep reduces the risk for SIDS, also known as "cot death" or "crib death". This campaign has been successful in promoting infant back sleeping and other risk-reduction strategies to parents, family members, child care providers, health professionals, and all other caregivers of infants, at the cost of increasing the incidence of this deformation of the head. It is considered a cosmetic problem. Many pediatricians remain unaware of the issue and possible treatments. Treatments include regular prone repositioning of babies ("tummy time").

== As a trait in pets ==
In pets, brachycephaly describes a type of skull with a high cephalic index, such as in snub-nosed breeds of dog such as pugs, Shih Tzus, and bulldogs or cats such as the Persian, Exotic and Himalayan. The term is from Greek roots meaning 'short' and 'head'. While being a cosmetically desirable trait of specific cat and dog breeds, the production and breeding of brachycephalic animals is considered animal abuse in a few jurisdictions. Due to the fact that animals with significantly shortened skulls frequently develop brachycephalic airway obstructive syndrome, causing them to have difficulties when breathing, suffering from hyperthermia due to insufficient cooling abilities and frequent infections of the cornea and lachrymal glands. While the breeding of animals that will have significantly worsened life quality due to anatomical abnormalities is illegal in some European countries, the production of such breeds is still frequent. Apart from these, brachycephalic pups and kittens also have high prenatal mortality. Attention should be paid to breed standards which promote increased brachycephaly in cats which has the potential to negatively impact their welfare, and potential buyers of brachycephalic cat breeds should be made aware of the risks of their conformation.

Brachycephalic cat breeds such as the Burmese, Himalayan and Persian normally have mandibular mesioclusion – a condition involving the incisors not being aligned correctly. This can lead to the incisors injuring the gingival tissue. In mesaticephalic breeds this is considered abnormal.

== Treatment ==
In humans, brachycephaly can be corrected with cranial remolding orthoses (helmets), which provide painless total contact over the prominent areas of the skull and leave voids over the flattened areas to provide a pathway for more symmetrical skull growth. Treatment generally takes 3–4 months, but varies depending on the infant's age and the severity of the cranial asymmetry.

However, studies by scientists in the Netherlands investigating helmet therapy on mild to moderate cases of brachycephaly have found there was no significant difference over time between infants treated with helmets and infants left untreated. All parents of infants treated with helmets confirmed negative side effects including skin irritation and sweating. The study was criticised by the American Orthotic & Prosthetic Association in a letter to the New York Times. The letter noted that the study focused only on mild to moderate cases, saying that helmet treatment may still be useful for more severe cases. The letter also criticised the low participation rate (21%) of the randomized study, and noted that the incidence of fitting issues in the study, at 73%, "seems very high".

== See also ==
- Artificial cranial deformation
- Craniosynostosis
- Dolichocephaly
- Plagiocephaly
