= BPT =

BPT may refer to:

- Bachelor of Physiotherapy
- Benign paroxysmal torticollis, a medical disorder
- Biblioteca pentru toți, a Romanian collection of literary publications
- BP Prudhoe Bay Royalty Trust (NYSE symbol)
- Bridgeport, Connecticut, US (nickname)
- Broken Picture Telephone, a collaborative game
- Jack Brooks Regional Airport (IATA airport code)
- Battle physical training for Royal Marines and Royal Marines Reserve
- A variant of the Mazda B engine
