= Tummy time =

Colloquialism related to child-rearing

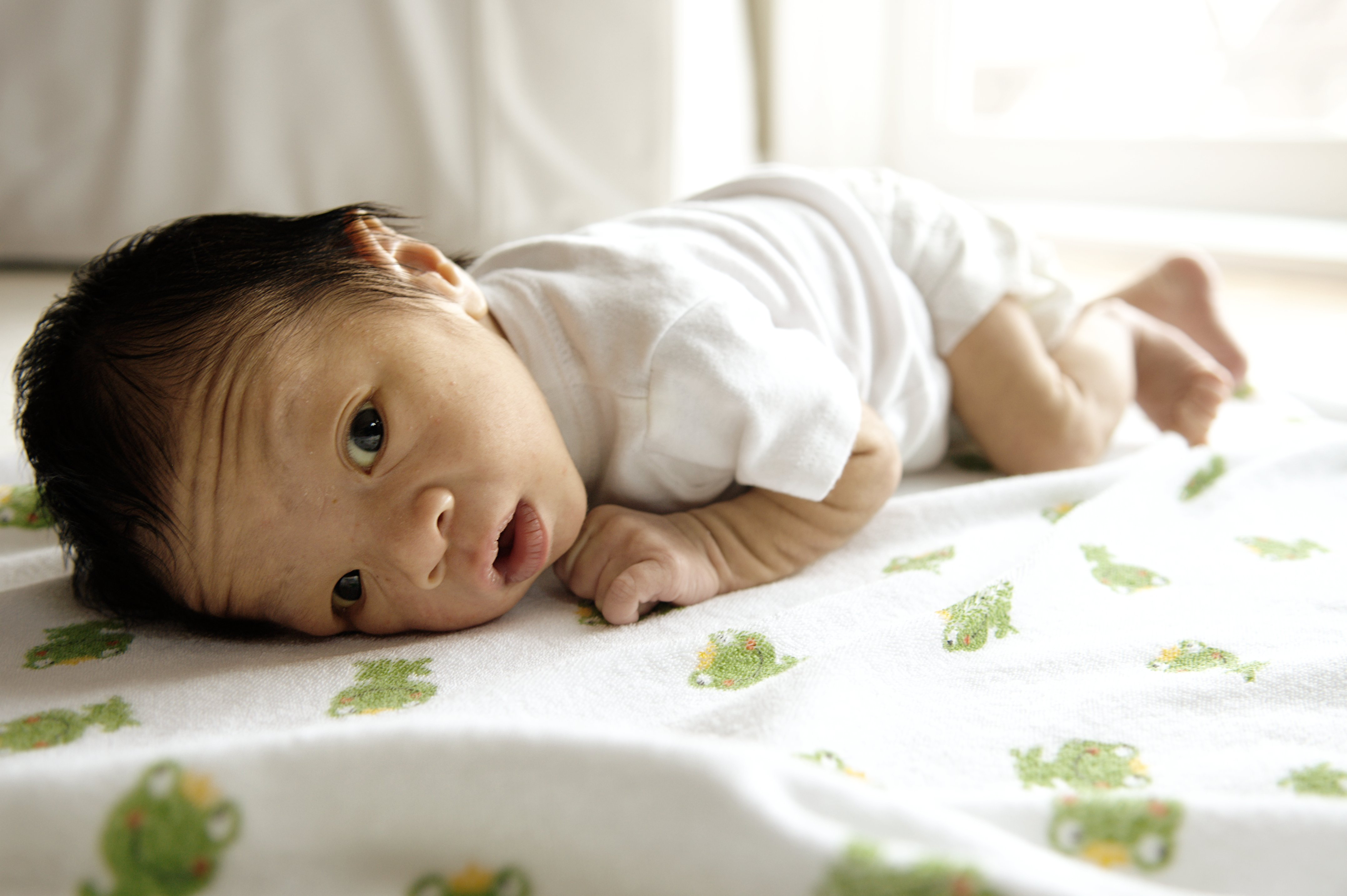
An infant lying on his stomach.

Tummy time is a colloquialism for placing infants in the prone position while awake and supervised to encourage development of the neck and trunk muscles and prevent skull deformations.

In 1992, the American Academy of Pediatrics recommended babies sleep on their backs to prevent sudden infant death syndrome (SIDS). Although the rate of SIDS has decreased by 50% since the Safe to Sleep campaign started in 1994, an unintended consequence was that babies missed out on the twelve or so hours they used to spend in the prone position while asleep, and there was a sharp increase in plagiocephaly (flat head syndrome) in infants. Along with tummy time, rotating the direction infants lie in their cribs as well as avoiding too much time in car seats, carriers, and bouncers are behaviors recommended to alleviate the associated risks of infants sleeping in a supine position.

== Impact on development ==
Infants put to sleep in the supine position have been found to reach motor developmental milestones (e.g. crawling, rolling, and sitting) at a slower rate compared to infants who sleep in the prone position. A 2017 systematic review found a significant positive correlation between supervised tummy time and the timely achievement of gross motor milestones, particularly when practiced for more than 15 minutes daily by two months of age. When babies experience tummy time in their waking hours, they are provided with opportunities to strengthen their neck and trunk muscles. Positioning the infant on their stomach while awake will not impact the amount of slow wave sleep since tummy time only occurs when an infant is awake.

Not only does tummy time improve and strengthen an infant’s muscles, but it also aids in improving neural connections. The brain's ability to form new neural connections through experiences and verbal interactions is called plasticity. When an infant lies supine, they are only able to see what is above them. However, when an infant is lying in a prone position, they can use their neck and trunk muscles to take in their surroundings. This allows an infant to form neural connections in relation to their environment, the communication with their caregivers, and even the learning toys in front of them. While improving muscular support and brain stimulation, tummy time allows an infant to reach their developmental milestones.

Furthermore, tummy time provides infants with opportunities for cognitive and communicative development through interactive play with their supervisor.

Meeting with a physical therapist can benefit an infant with developmental disabilities by working on tummy time in the office and engaging the guardians so the exercises can be replicated at home. Tactics such as proper head positioning or the use of a toy for entertainment within reach can improve strength, stability, and increase neural connections. Safe play with guardians allows the infant to progress in their developmental milestones, eventually resulting in independent sitting, standing, and walking.

== Implementation ==
Tummy time is recommended to be practiced from birth, first in short sessions of three to five minutes, two to three times a day. As babies grow more receptive towards the sessions, they can be extended and performed more frequently. The World Health Organization advises that infants under one year of age who are not yet mobile should experience tummy time for at least 30 minutes per day across sessions. Supervision by a parent or caregiver is important during tummy time so that the infant's position can be monitored and to encourage social interaction. Babies who are unaccustomed to frequent tummy time sessions may cry or show noncompliance when it is first introduced. Research suggests that while factors like infant age and time spent in the bath can increase duration, maternal concerns regarding infant distress remain a primary barrier to consistent practice. However, enjoyment may be increased by providing stimulating objects during sessions, such as preferred toys and videos.

Tummy time may also be used to stabilize the neck in torticollis, and to address hypertonia associated with Down syndrome.

Infants with these developmental disabilities often present with decreased muscle tone in their upper and lower extremities. An early intervention of tummy time, beginning at 2–4 months, has been shown to have the greatest effects on motor development. Especially in infants with Down Syndrome or CP, their bodies are weak and may be unable to perform the typical milestone tasks. If tummy time is implemented early, motor skills will improve, allowing a better performance in sitting up independently, progressing to standing up, and eventually walking.

In society today, technology is advancing not only for social use but also for healthcare. The use of early interventions, such as tummy time in infants, is crucial for their development. However, it is not easy. First-time parents may feel uneasy or anxious about placing their baby in a prone position, especially given the stigma that babies do not like tummy time. To put those first-time parents at ease, they can use their phone or computer to meet with their pediatrician to ensure that their baby and the environment are safe. Mobile phones are widely available and a great tool that can be used to communicate with the primary care doctor.

Although sleeping in the supine position (on the baby's back) without sufficient tummy time may change the physical appearance of the head through plagiocephaly and consequently promote developmental delays, regardless of these effects, it is essential that infants are placed to sleep on their back, because of the risk of SIDS.

== See also ==
- Sudden infant death syndrome
- Safe to Sleep Campaign
- Plagiocephaly
- Torticollis
