= Safe to Sleep =

Public health initiative to promote safe sleeping positions for babies

The campaign logo, illustrating a baby sleeping in a supine position

The Safe to Sleep campaign, formerly known as the Back to Sleep campaign, is an initiative backed by the U.S. National Institute of Child Health and Human Development (NICHD) at the U.S. National Institutes of Health to encourage parents to have their infants sleep on their backs (supine position) to reduce the risk of sudden infant death syndrome (SIDS). The target age group of the campaign is 0–1 years of age, because this is when babies are at the greatest risk of experiencing SIDS. Since "Safe to Sleep" was launched in 1994, the incidence of SIDS has declined by more than 50%. However, there has been a rise in infant sleep-related suffocation events. Consequently, the campaign has broadened its goal to focus on safe sleep conditions and further preventative measures.

== History ==
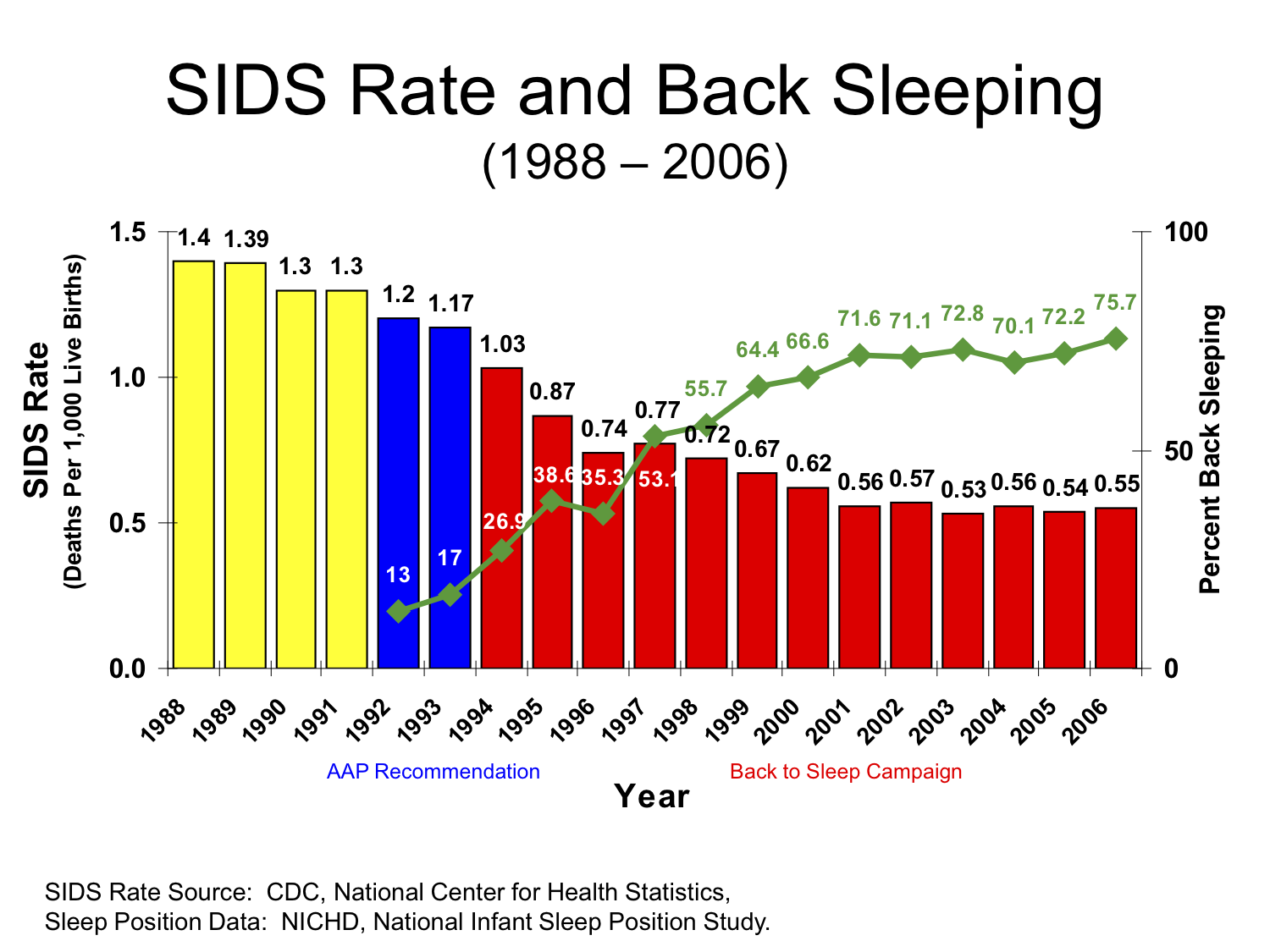
A plot of SIDS rate from 1988 to 2006

In 1992, the American Academy of Pediatrics (AAP) recommended (Note: Although recommended by AAP, it was apparently followed in some other countries, too. For instance, a study from France from 1999 reports that after this campaign, the incidence of SIDS in France fell from 1464 to just 358 within the period of 1991-1997.) that babies sleep on their backs or sides to reduce the risk of SIDS (a revised statement in 1996 retracted the side-sleeping option). NICHD launched the "Back to Sleep" campaign in 1994 to spread the message.

The campaign was successful in significantly reducing the percentage of babies sleeping on their stomachs (prone position). It was found, however, that a significant portion of African-American babies were still sleeping on their stomachs; in 1999, an African-American baby was 2.2 times more likely to die of SIDS than a white baby. Thus, then Secretary of Health and Human Services Donna Shalala and Tipper Gore refocused the "Back to Sleep" campaign on minority babies.

== Campaign ==
In 1985, Davies reported that in Hong Kong, where the common Chinese habit was for supine infant sleep position (face up), SIDS was a rare problem. In 1987 the Netherlands started a campaign advising parents to place their newborn infants to sleep on their backs (supine position) instead of their stomachs (prone position). This was followed by infant supine sleep position campaigns in the United Kingdom (as "Back to Sleep"), New Zealand, and Australia in 1991, the U.S. and Sweden in 1992, and Canada in 1993.

This advice was based on the epidemiology of SIDS and physiological evidence, which showed that infants who sleep on their backs have lower arousal thresholds and less slow-wave sleep (SWS) compared to infants who sleep on their stomachs. Thus, infants sleeping on their backs are more easily awakened.

In human infants, sleep develops rapidly during early development. This development includes an increase in non-rapid eye movement (NREM) sleep – which is also called quiet sleep (QS) – during the first 12 months of life, in association with a decrease in rapid eye movement (REM) sleep – which is also known as active sleep (AS). In addition, slow wave sleep (SWS) – which consists of stage 3 and stage 4 NREM sleep – appears at 2 months of age, and it is theorized that some infants have a brain-stem defect which increases their risk of being unable to arouse from SWS (also called deep sleep) and therefore have an increased risk of SIDS due to their decreased ability to arouse from SWS.

Studies have shown that preterm infants, full-term infants, and older infants have greater time periods of quiet sleep and also decreased time awake when they are positioned to sleep on their stomachs, meaning these babies are harder to wake when sleeping on their tummy. In both human infants and rats, arousal thresholds have been shown to be at higher levels in the electroencephalography (EEG) during slow-wave sleep.

In 1992, a SIDS risk reduction strategy based upon lowering arousal thresholds during SWS was implemented by the American Academy of Pediatrics (AAP) which began recommending that healthy infants be positioned to sleep on their back (supine position) or side (lateral position) instead of their stomach (prone position) when being placed down for sleep. In 1994, a number of organizations in the United States combined to further communicate these non-prone sleep position recommendations, and this became formally known as the "Back To Sleep" campaign. In 1996, the AAP further refined its sleep position recommendation by stating that infants should only be placed to sleep in the supine position and not in the prone or lateral positions.

Since the launch of the campaign, the incidence of SIDS has declined by more than half. However, 3,400 babies (ages 0–1) still die per year from SIDS and sleep-related suffocation events despite the implementation of this campaign. The AAP and further research has shown that there are preventative measures that can be taken to control environmental factors to prevent such adverse events.

== SIDS risk factors ==
Risk factors for SIDS can be divided into three major categories: maternal, infant, and environmental factors. The factors mentioned below are modifiable and preventable to help decrease the occurrence of SIDS and sleep-related suffocation events.

| Maternal factors | Infant factors | Environmental factors |
|---|---|---|
| Young maternal age; Smoking during pregnancy; No prenatal care; Late prenatal care | Preterm birth; Low birth weight | Prone sleeping position; Sleeping on a soft surface; Sleeping with loose blankets, pillows, or stuffed toys; Bed-sharing/co-sleeping; Sleeping in car seats, rocking seats, or inclined chairs; Overheating |

== Preventive measures ==
Several precautions focused on controlling environmental factors can be taken to minimize the risk of SIDS and sleep-related suffocation events. Per the safe to sleep campaign, these preventive measures can be taken to decrease the rate of SIDS and sleep-related suffocation events:

- Sleeping on back
- Sleeping on a firm/hard surface
- Nothing in the crib or bassinet other than the baby
  - No stuffed toys, loose blankets and/or crib bumpers
- Room sharing
  - This is different from sharing a bed with an infant. This entails sleeping in the same room as one's baby but making sure the baby has a safe sleeping space free of the aforementioned risk factors.
- Use of a pacifier while the baby is sleeping
  - The concept behind the use of a pacifier during sleep is that these babies do not sleep as deeply and might be more easily arousable; thus, they are less likely to have an adverse sleep-related event.
- Tummy time
  - Regular tummy time helps to strengthen babies' core, neck, and shoulder muscles. These muscle groups are essential in helping babies to turn their head and bodies to avoid suffocating during sleep.
- Avoiding sleep in a car seat outside of the car
  - A car seat is only safe to sleep in while in the car.
- Avoiding sleep in an inclined chair (e.g., Rock 'n Play Sleeper, rocking swings, etc.) without constant supervision
- Breastfeeding
- Regular prenatal care
- No smoking during pregnancy
- Avoid secondhand smoke exposure
- Up-to-date immunizations

== See also ==
- Sudden infant death syndrome
- Tummy time
- Plagiocephaly
- United States Department of Health and Human Services
