= Dolichocephaly =

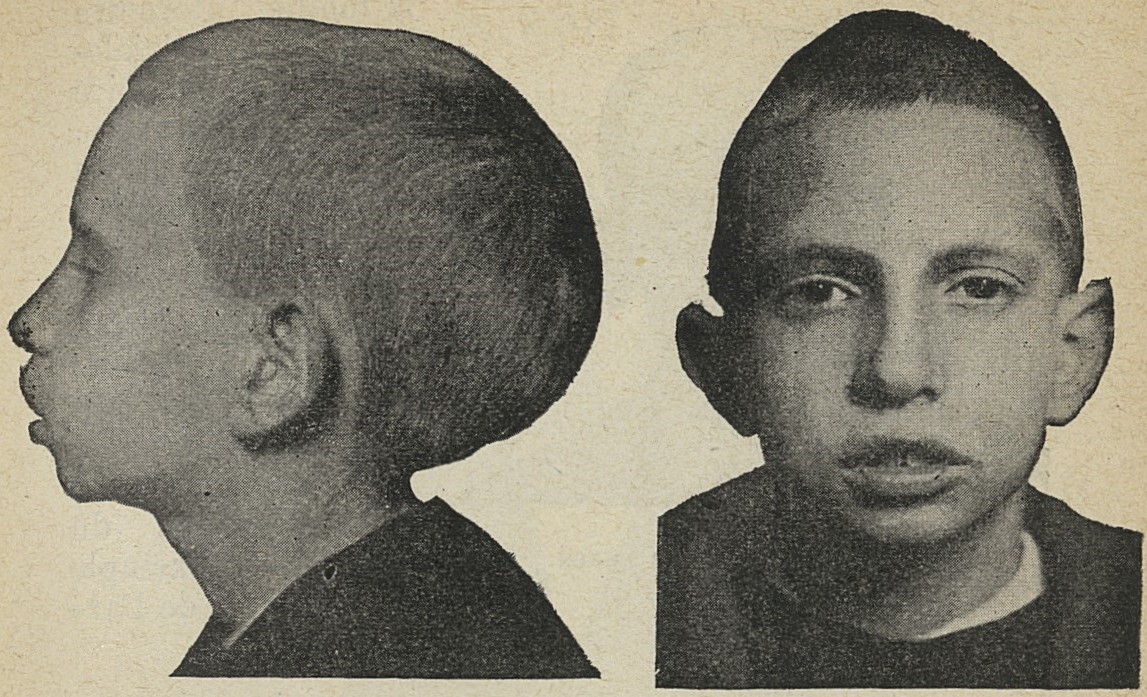
- Dolichocephaly (scaphocephaly) in a 10-year-old
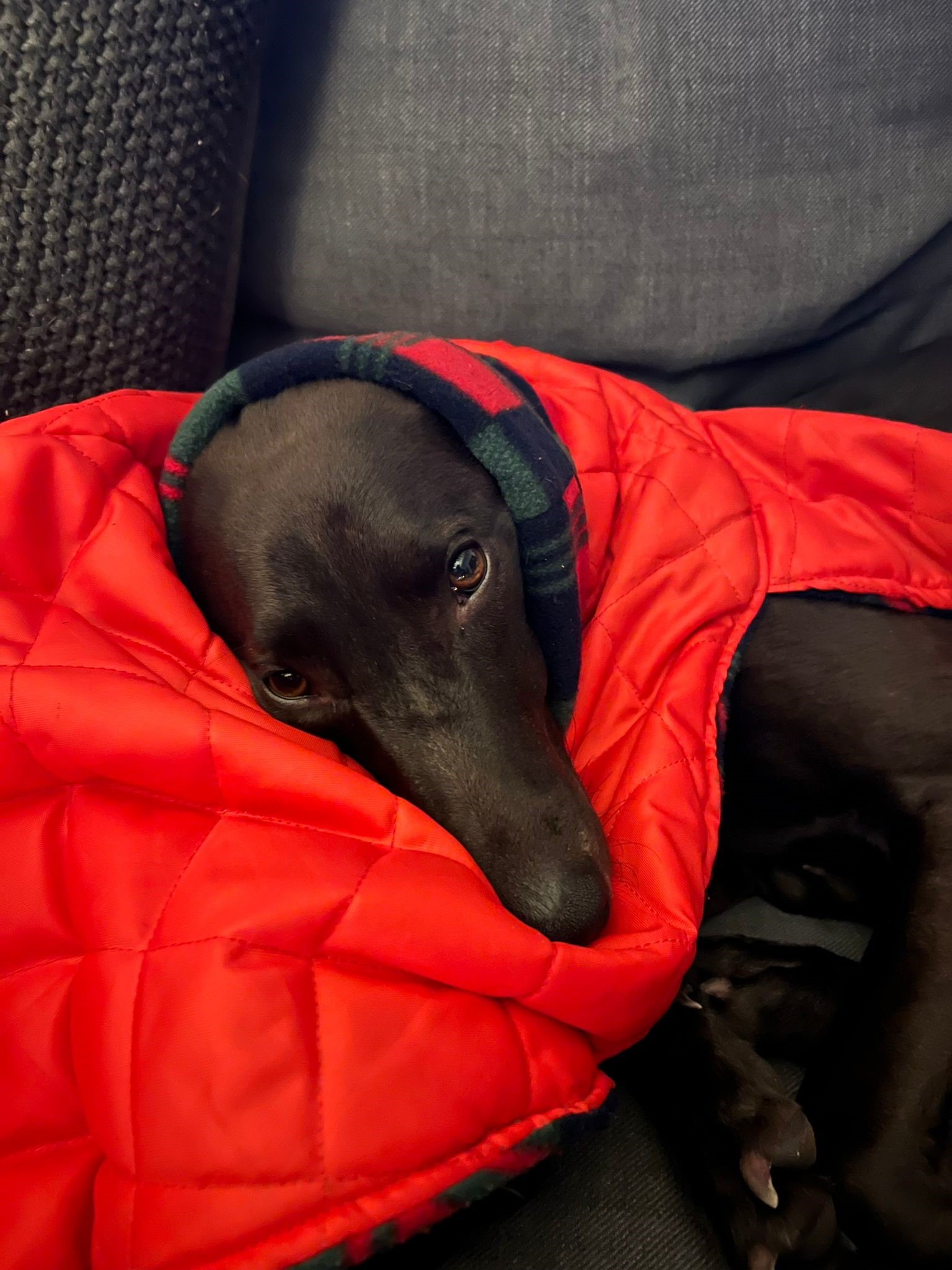
- Dolichocephalic head shape of Lurcher-type dogs
- Specialty: Medical genetics

Dolichocephaly (derived from the Ancient Greek δολιχός 'long' and κεφαλή 'head') is a term used to describe a head that is longer than average relative to its width. In humans, scaphocephaly is a form of dolichocephaly.

Dolichocephalic dogs (such as sighthounds) have elongated muzzles. This makes them vulnerable to fungal diseases of the nose such as aspergillosis. In humans the anterior–posterior diameter (length) of dolichocephaly head is more than the transverse diameter (width).

Dolichocephaly can sometimes be a symptom of Sensenbrenner syndrome, Crouzon syndrome, Sotos syndrome, CMFTD and Marfan syndrome. However, it also occurs non-pathologically as a result of normal variation between human populations. The standards for denoting dolichocephaly are derived from European anatomy norms, and thus describing dolichocephaly as a medical condition may not reflect the diversity in different human populations.

In anthropology, human populations have been characterized as either dolichocephalic (long-headed), mesocephalic (moderate-headed), or brachycephalic (short-headed). The usefulness of the cephalic index was questioned by Giuseppe Sergi, who argued that cranial morphology provided a better means to model racial ancestry.

== See also ==
- Brachycephaly
- Cephalic index
- Plagiocephaly
