= Prone position =

Body position in which one lies flat with the chest down and back up

Supine position and prone position

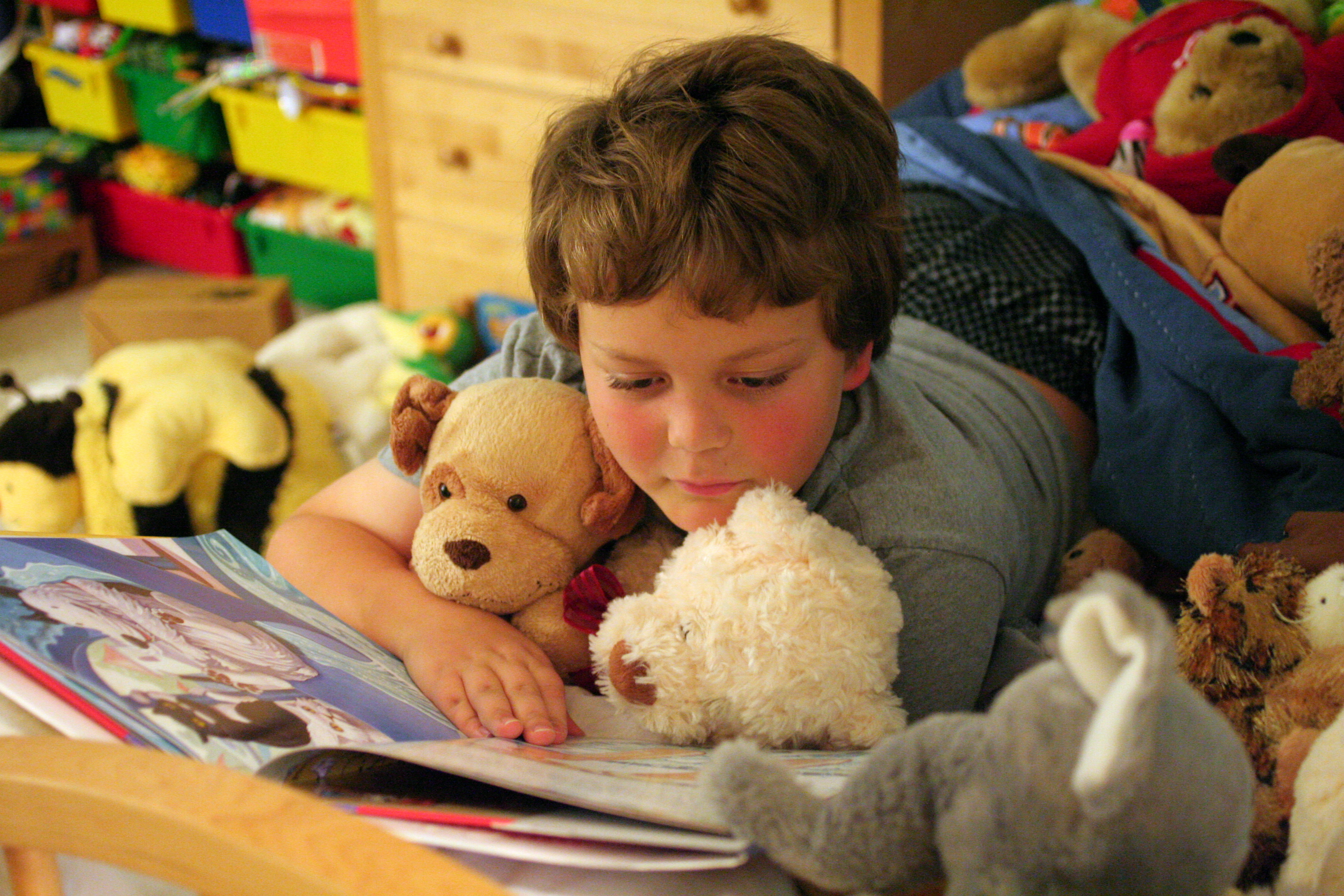
A child reading a book in prone position

Prone position (/proʊn/) is a body position in which a person lies flat with their chest down and their back up. In anatomical terms of location, the dorsal or posterior side is facing up, and the ventral or anterior side is facing down. The supine position is the prone position's contrast, rotated 180°. To move into prone position is to pronate.

== Etymology ==
The word prone, meaning "naturally inclined to something, apt, liable," has been recorded in English since 1382; the meaning "lying face-down" was first recorded in 1578. It is also referred to as "lying down" or "going prone."

Prone derives from the Latin pronus, meaning "bent forward, inclined to," from the adverbial form of the prefix pro- "forward." Both the original, literal, and the derived figurative sense were used in Latin, but the figurative is older in English.

== Anatomy ==
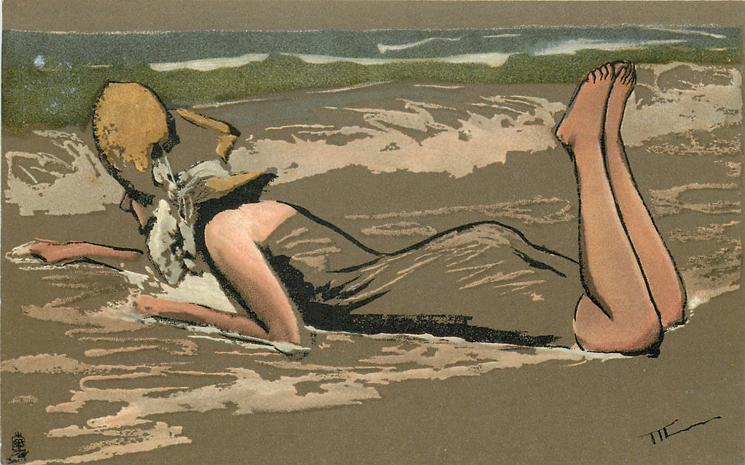
A postcard of a woman on a beach in prone position

In anatomy, the prone position is a position of the human body lying face down. It is opposed to the supine position which is face up. Using the terms defined in the anatomical position, the ventral side is down, and the dorsal side is up.

Concerning the forearm, prone refers to that configuration where the palm of the hand is directed posteriorly, and the radius and ulna are crossed.

Researchers observed that the expiratory reserve volume measured at relaxation volume increased from supine to prone by the factor of 0.15.

== Shooting ==
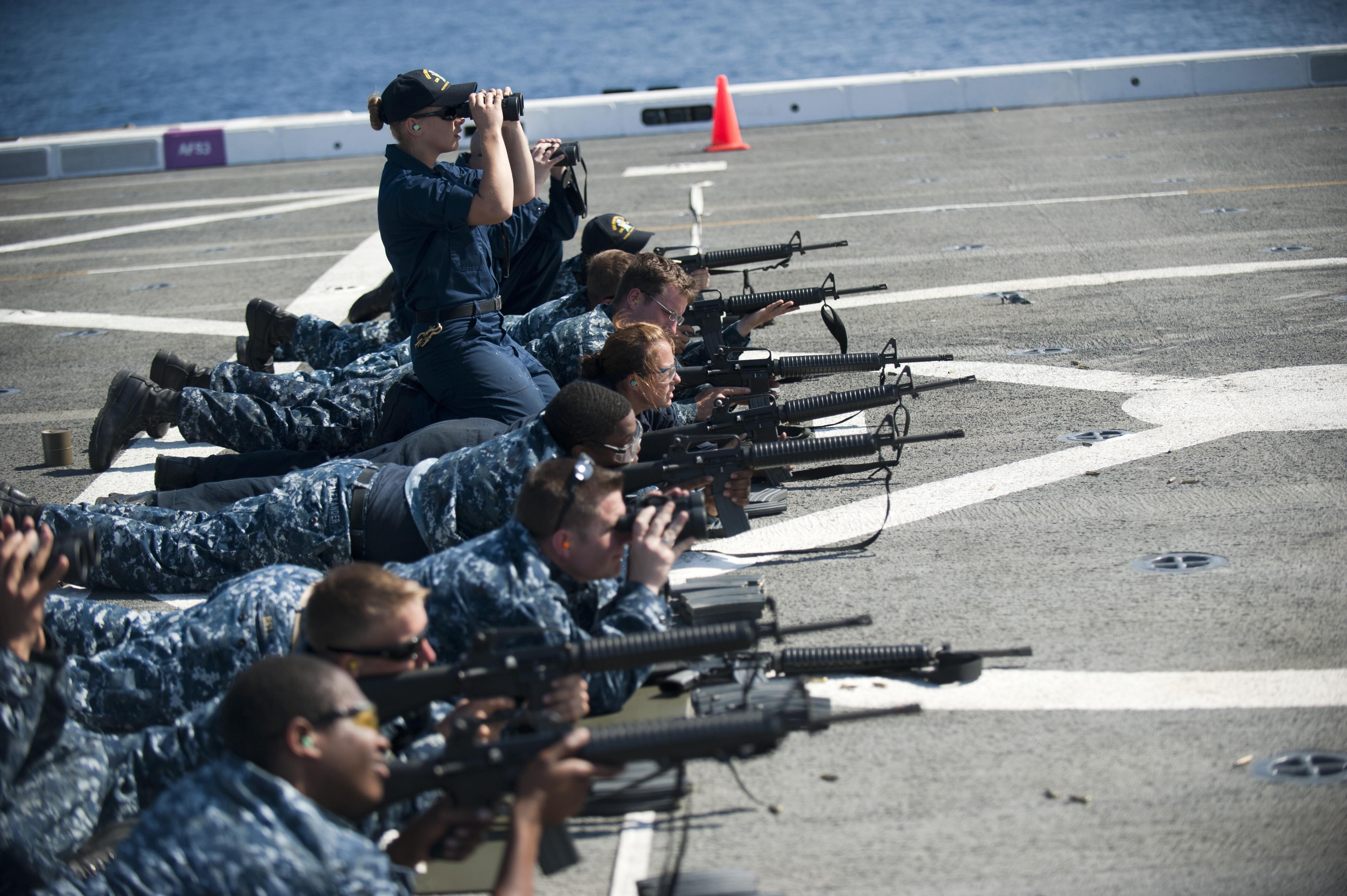
U.S. Navy sailors in the prone position during service rifle qualification training

In competitive shooting, the prone position is the position of a shooter lying face down on the ground. It is considered the easiest and most accurate position as the ground provides extra stability. It is one of the positions in three positions events. For many years (1932–2016), the only purely prone Olympic event was the 50 meter rifle prone; however, this has since been dropped from the Olympic program. Both men and women still have the 50 meter rifle three positions as an Olympic shooting event.

Prone position is often used in military combat because the prone position provides the best accuracy and stability (as well as shrinking the shooter's profile). Many first-person shooter video games also allow the player character to go into the prone position, again with similar benefits.

=== Fullbore target rifle ===
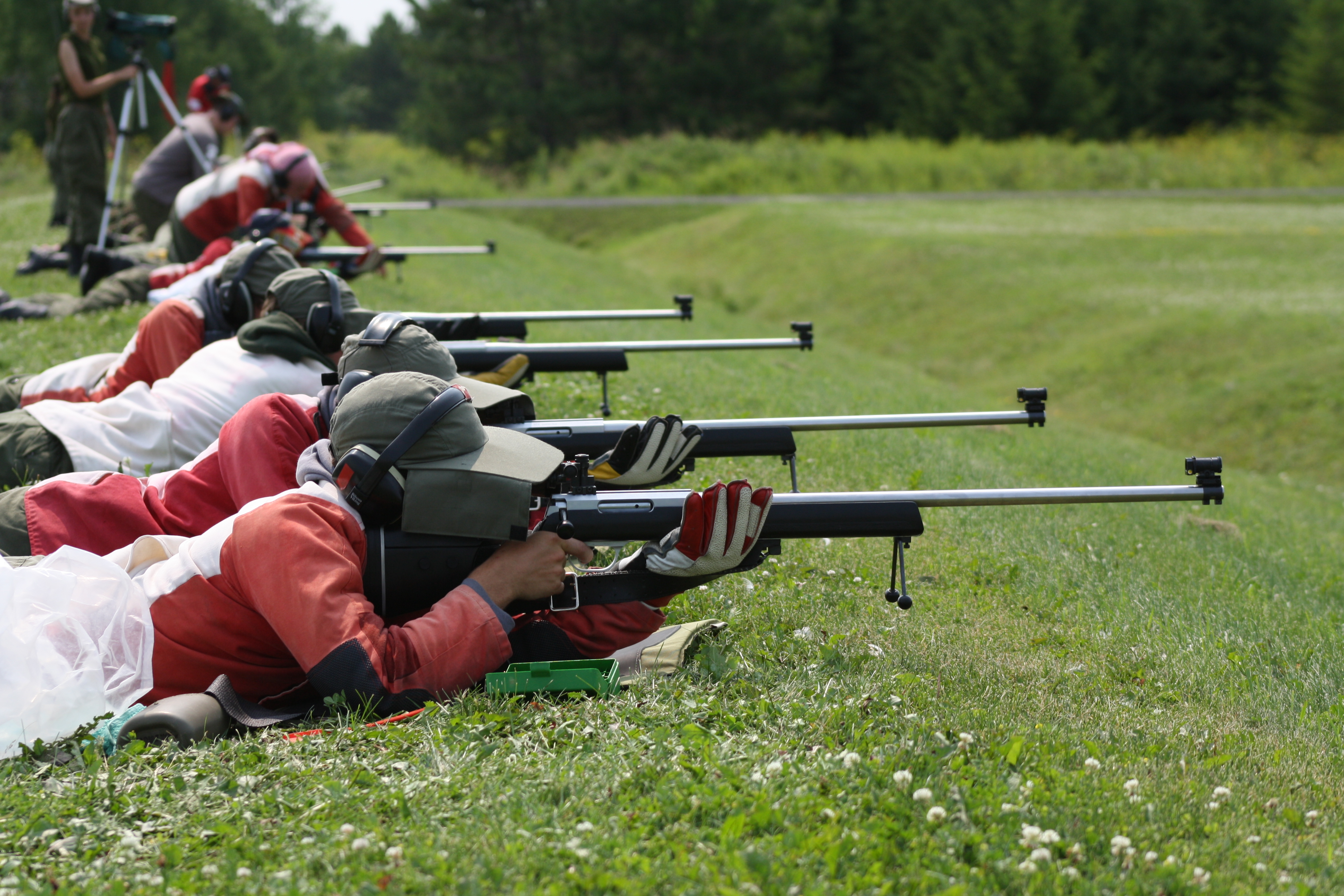
Canadian Cadets firing fullbore target rifles prone

The non-ISSF fullbore disciplines governed by the International Confederation of Fullbore Rifle Associations (ICFRA) are exclusively shot from the prone position over distances of 300–1,200 yards. These disciplines are popular in Commonwealth countries, and are heavily influenced by the British National Rifle Association.

=== Biathlon ===
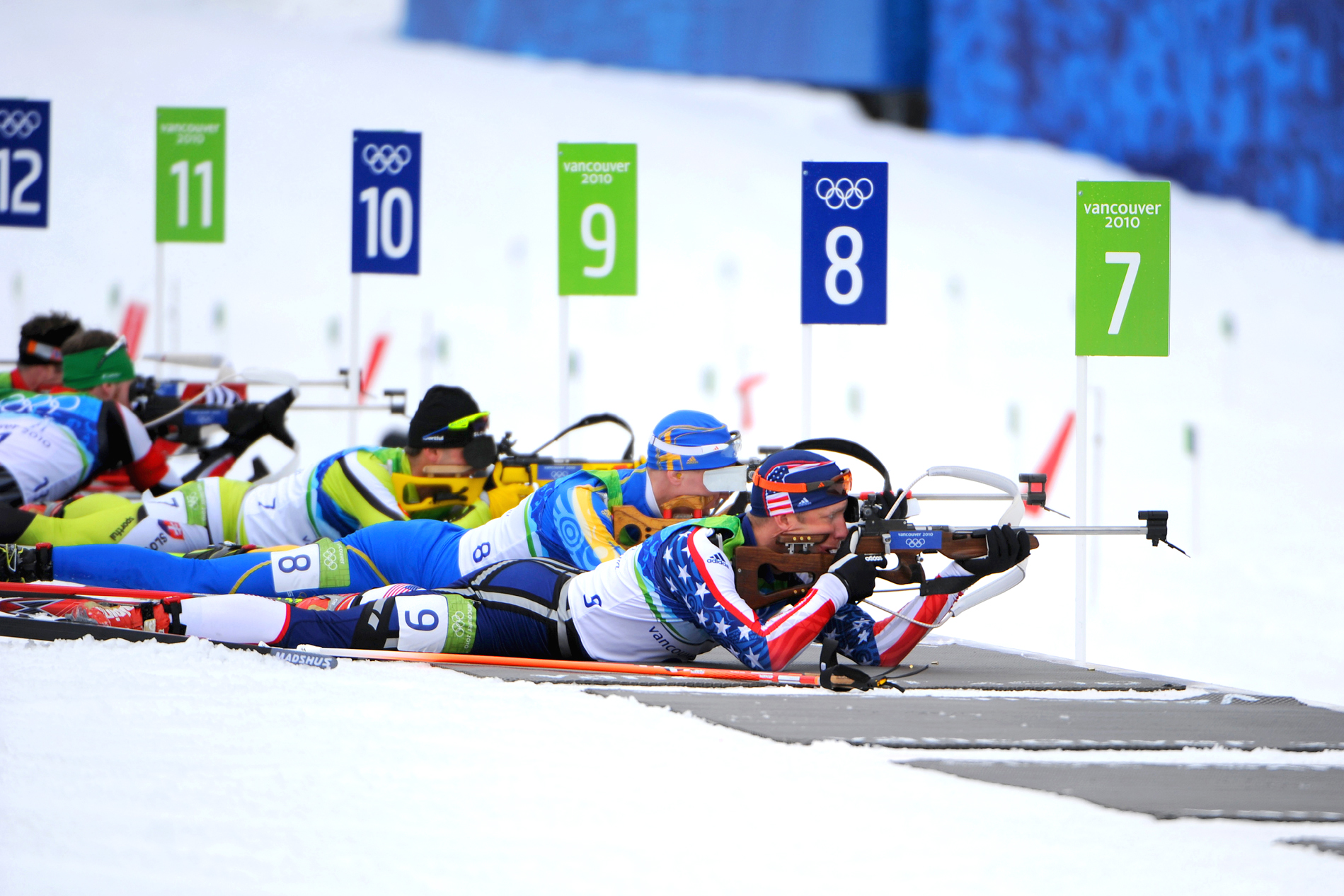
Biathlon prone phase during the men's pursuit at the 2010 Winter Olympics

In Biathlon, prone is one of two positions that athletes shoot from during competition, the other being standing. In the prone position biathletes, set their poles down to their side or rear, flip open their snow covers, load their rifle, and lay on a designated shooting mat at a designated lane to perform their shooting stage. Using a system of kneeling and removal of the rifle from the athletes back, the biathlete loads their rifle and takes off their poles all on this shooting mat at a designated shooting lane. Prone lanes are specified by a visual sign., typically showing the position and an arrow. These lanes are typically assigned to the further half or right half of the range.

Additionally, in this position biathletes, use a prone sling which is attached by a hook onto an armband worn on the non-shooting arm around the bicep of the biathlete. The biathlete takes aim at 5 targets with diameters of 115mm but hit zones of only 45mm. Hitting these targets allows biathletes to avoid either, the use of spare rounds of ammunition which must be hand loaded into the chamber, the skiing of mandatory penalty loops or the imposition of time penalties depending on the biathlon event in which the shooter is participating. The number of penalties, or loops to ski directly corresponds with the missed targets in the stage however, only 3 cartridge are given for any prone stage when spare rounds are available.

== Pilots ==
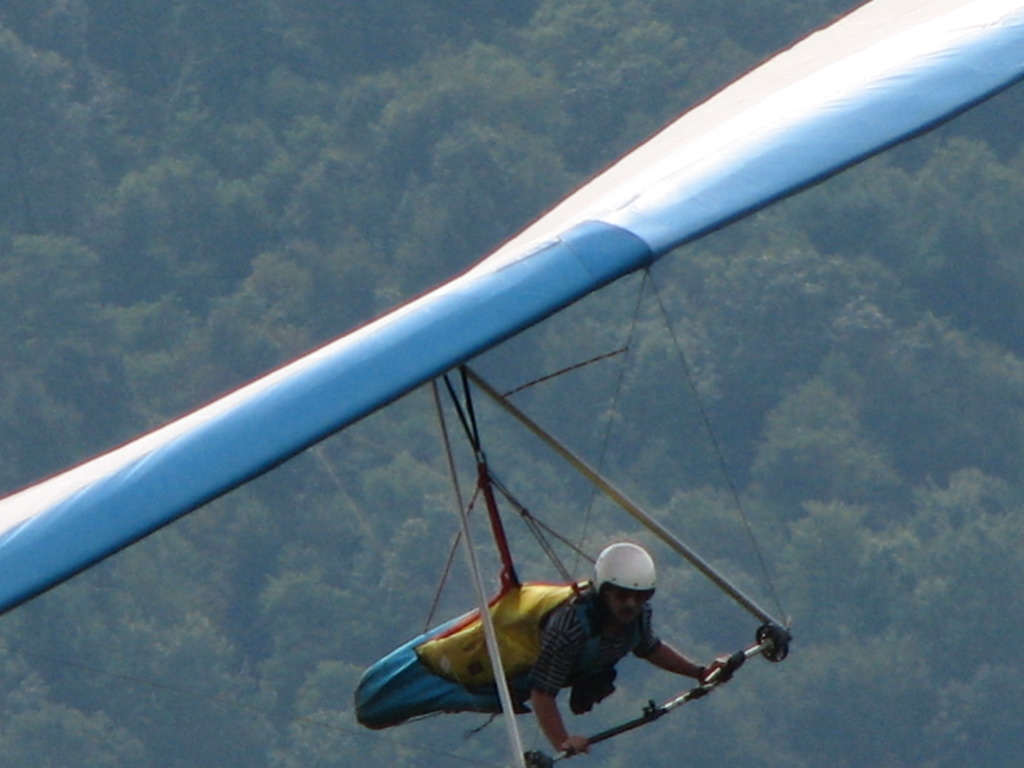
Hang glider pilot in harness

The prone position is also used to describe the way pilots and other crew may be positioned in an aircraft; lying on their stomachs rather than seated in a normal upright position. During World War II, the bomb aimer in some bombers would be positioned this way to be better able to view the ground through a transparent panel or bubble in the nose of a bomber. Later, it was suggested that a pilot in the prone position might be more effective in some kinds of high-speed aircraft, because it would permit the pilot to withstand a greater g-force in the upward and downward direction with respect to the plane, and many speculative designs of the 1950s featured this arrangement. However, it never became mainstream, as testing revealed that the increased difficulty of operating aircraft controls in the prone position outweighed the advantages. Three examples of this approach are seen in the Savoia-Marchetti SM.93, the Gloster Meteor F8 "Prone Pilot", and the Northrop XP-79. Modern hang gliders are typically piloted in the prone position.

== See also ==
- Lying position
- Positional asphyxia
- Prone bicycle
- Proning
- Recovery position
- Splooting
- Supine position
- Tummy time

== Sources ==
- Etymonline
