= Splooting =

Neologism for animal posture

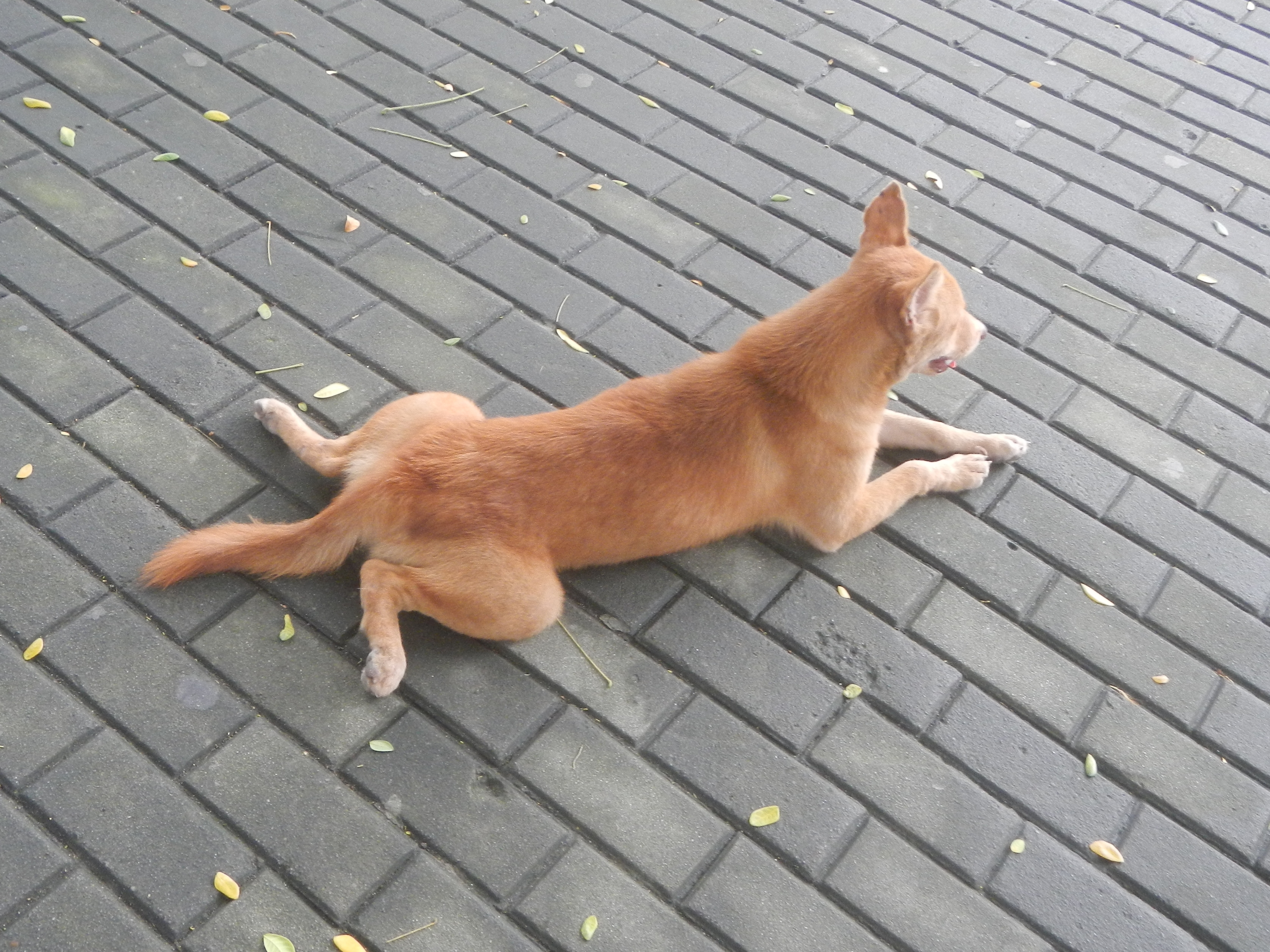
A splooting dog

Splooting is lying in a spread-legged, prone posture. It is typically performed by four-legged mammals such as dogs and squirrels when they wish to relax or cool down. It may also be known as frogging or pancaking.

== Behavior and function ==
Dogs may adopt this position to relax, stretch, or to relieve pressure on the spine. It is especially easy and natural for young, flexible dogs and dogs with short legs such as corgis.

Because dogs cannot cool themselves efficiently by sweating, they may use this position to cool their bodies by hugging a cold surface such as stone or tile.

Other animals that have been observed splooting include squirrels, bears, cats, rabbits, raccoons and marmots.

== Gallery ==
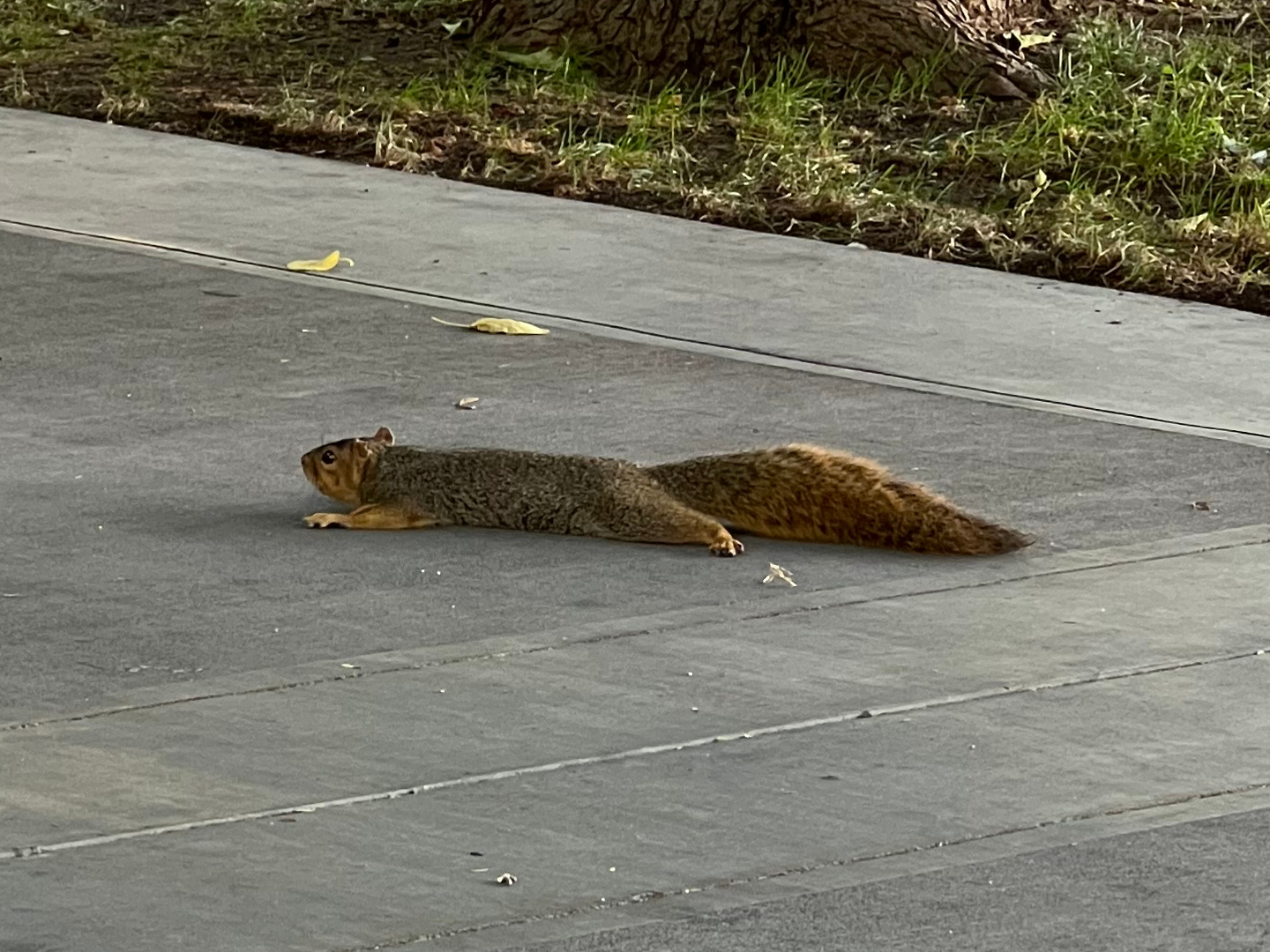
A squirrel splooting on the pavement

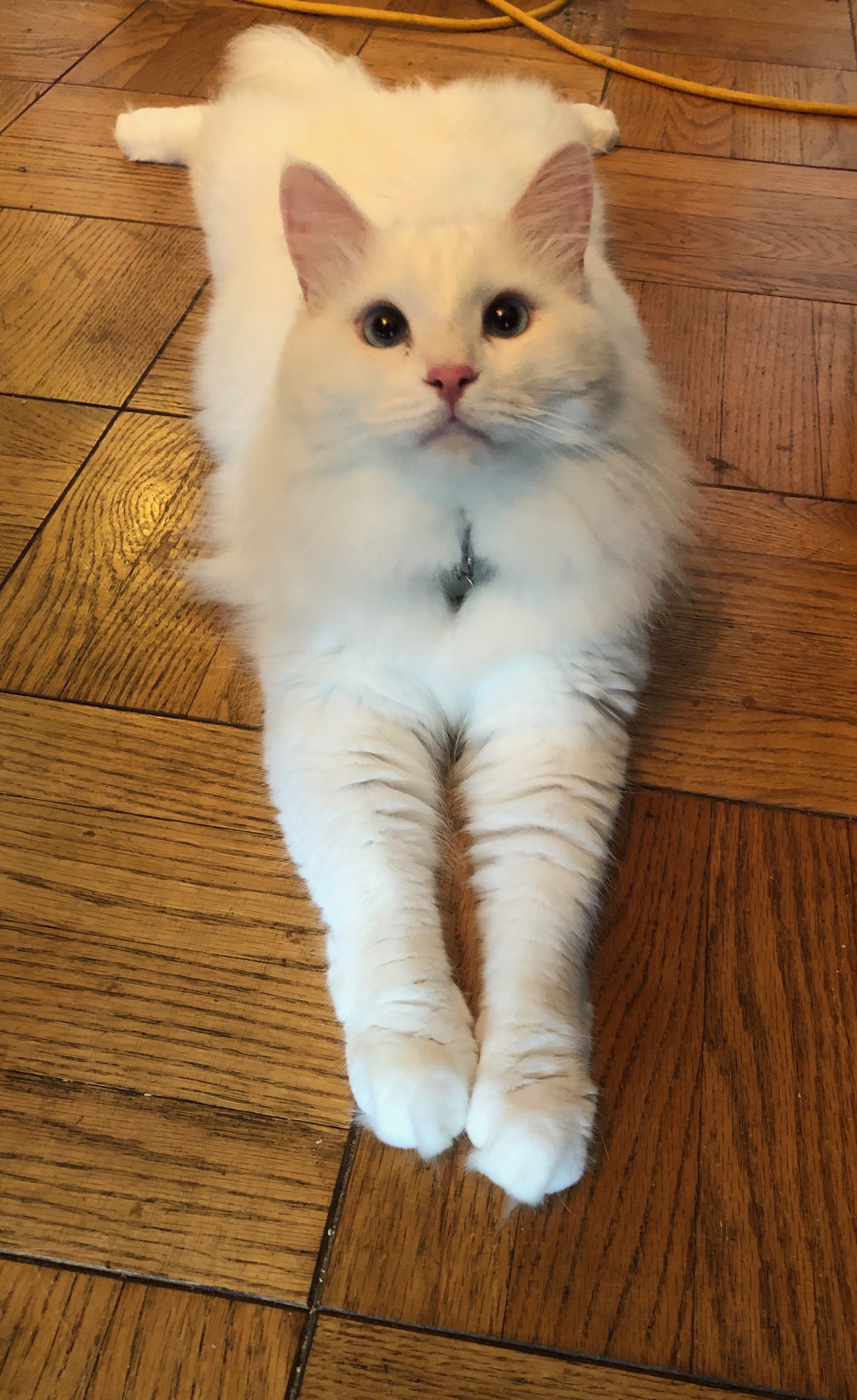
A splooting white Siberian cat

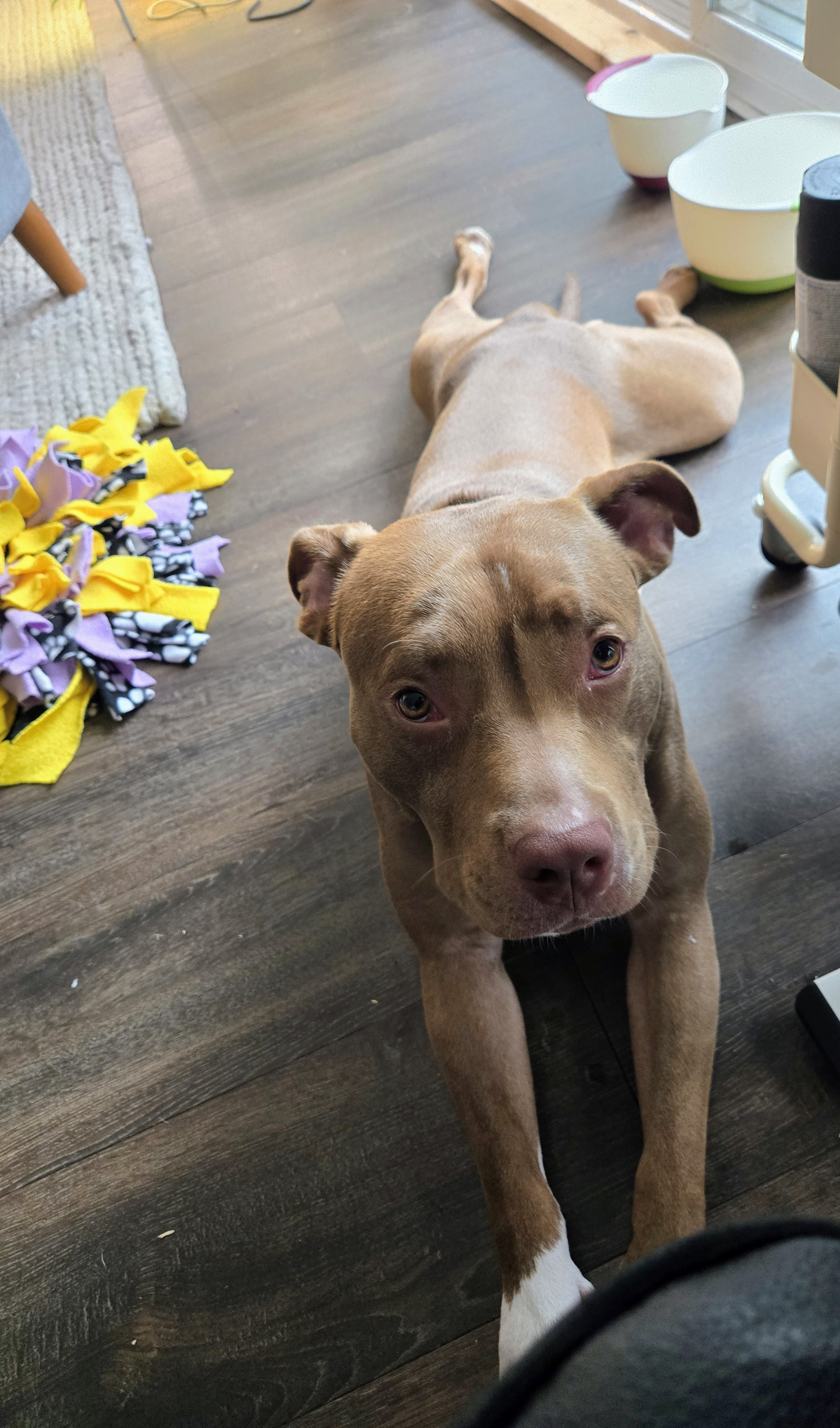
a Pit Bull splooting

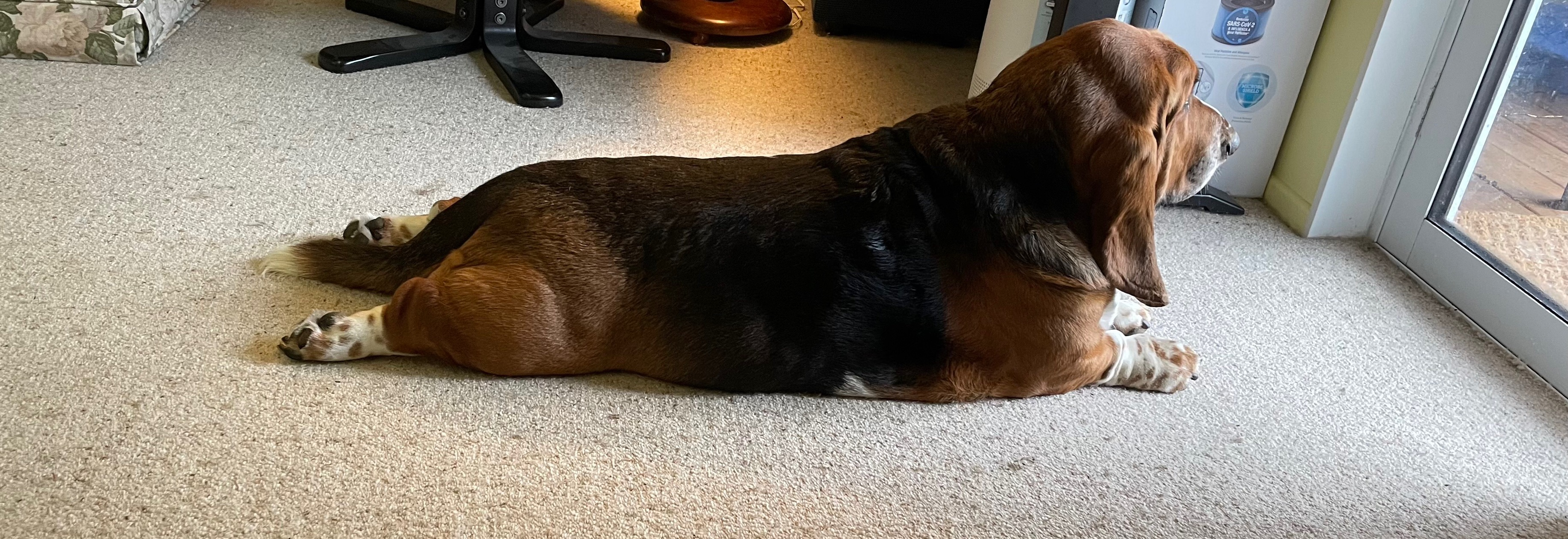
a side view of a Basset Hound splooting

marmot splooting on a snowfield

== See also ==
- Proning
- Catloaf
