= Plagiocephaly =

Skull malformation such that one side is flattened

- Other names: Flat head syndrome
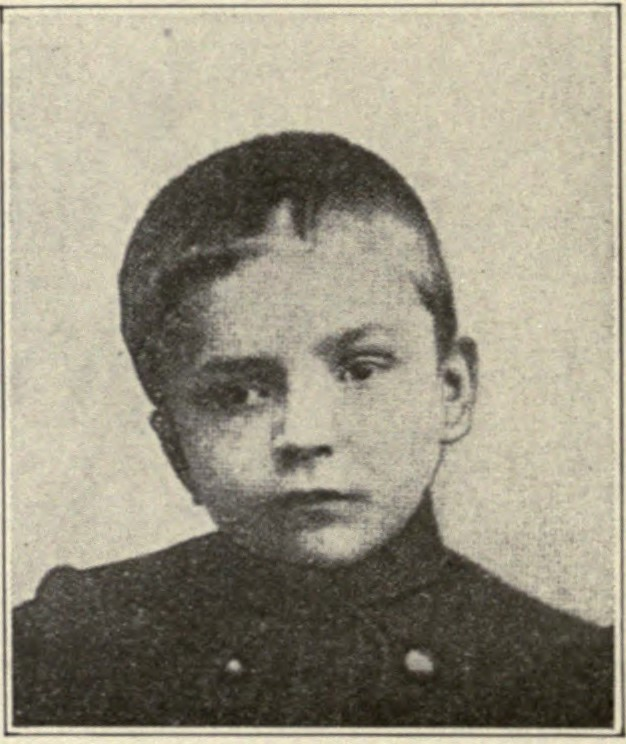
- Patient with plagiocephaly and wry neck
- Specialty: Medical genetics

Plagiocephaly, also known as flat head syndrome, is a condition characterized by an asymmetrical distortion (flattening of one side) of the skull. A mild and widespread form is characterized by a flat spot on the back or one side of the head caused by remaining in a supine position for prolonged periods.

Plagiocephaly is a diagonal asymmetry across the head shape. Often it is a flattening which is to one side at the back of the head, and there is often some facial asymmetry. Depending on whether synostosis is involved, plagiocephaly divides into two groups: synostotic, with one or more fused cranial sutures, and non-synostotic (deformational). Surgical treatment of these groups includes the deference method; however, the treatment of deformational plagiocephaly is controversial. Brachycephaly describes a very wide head shape with a flattening across the whole back of the head.

== Causes ==
Slight plagiocephaly is routinely diagnosed at birth and may be the result of a restrictive intrauterine environment giving a "diamond" shaped head when seen from above. If there is premature union of skull bones, this is more properly called craniosynostosis.

The incidence of plagiocephaly has increased dramatically since the advent of anti-sudden infant death syndrome recommendations for parents to keep their babies on their backs.

Data also suggest that the rates of plagiocephaly are higher for twins and multiple births, premature babies, babies who were positioned in the breech position or back-to-back, as well as for babies born after a prolonged labour.

=== Conditions and syndromes ===
Plagiocephaly is seen in multiple conditions:

- Arthrogryposis, cleft palate, craniosynostosis, and impaired intellectual development
- Autism spectrum disorder, susceptibility to, X-linked 2
- Blepharophimosis-impaired intellectual development syndrome
- Cardiac anomalies - developmental delay - facial dysmorphism syndrome
- CHIME syndrome
- Coffin-Siris syndrome 1 and 6
- Congenital nonprogressive myopathy with Moebius and Robin sequences
- Cornelia de Lange syndrome 3
- Cranioectodermal dysplasia 2
- Craniosynostosis (nonsyndromic) 6
- Developmental and epileptic encephalopathy, 1, 65, 77, and 84
- Developmental delay with variable intellectual impairment and behavioral abnormalities
- Dihydropyrimidinase deficiency
- Early-onset progressive diffuse brain atrophy-microcephaly-muscle weakness-optic atrophy syndrome
- Faciocardiorenal syndrome
- FG syndrome
- Galloway-Mowat syndrome 4
- Gaze palsy, familial horizontal, with progressive scoliosis 1
- Hyperphosphatasia with intellectual disability syndrome 1 and 2
- Hypotonia, infantile, with psychomotor retardation and characteristic facies 2
- Intellectual developmental disorder, autosomal dominant 64 and 66
- Intellectual disability, autosomal dominant 13, 40, 48, and 58
- Joubert syndrome 1
- Kleefstra syndrome 2
- Langer-Giedion syndrome
- Microphthalmia with brain and digit anomalies
- Mitochondrial DNA depletion syndrome 13
- Muenke syndrome
- Noonan syndrome 13
- Osteogenesis imperfecta, type 20
- Ritscher-Schinzel syndrome 4

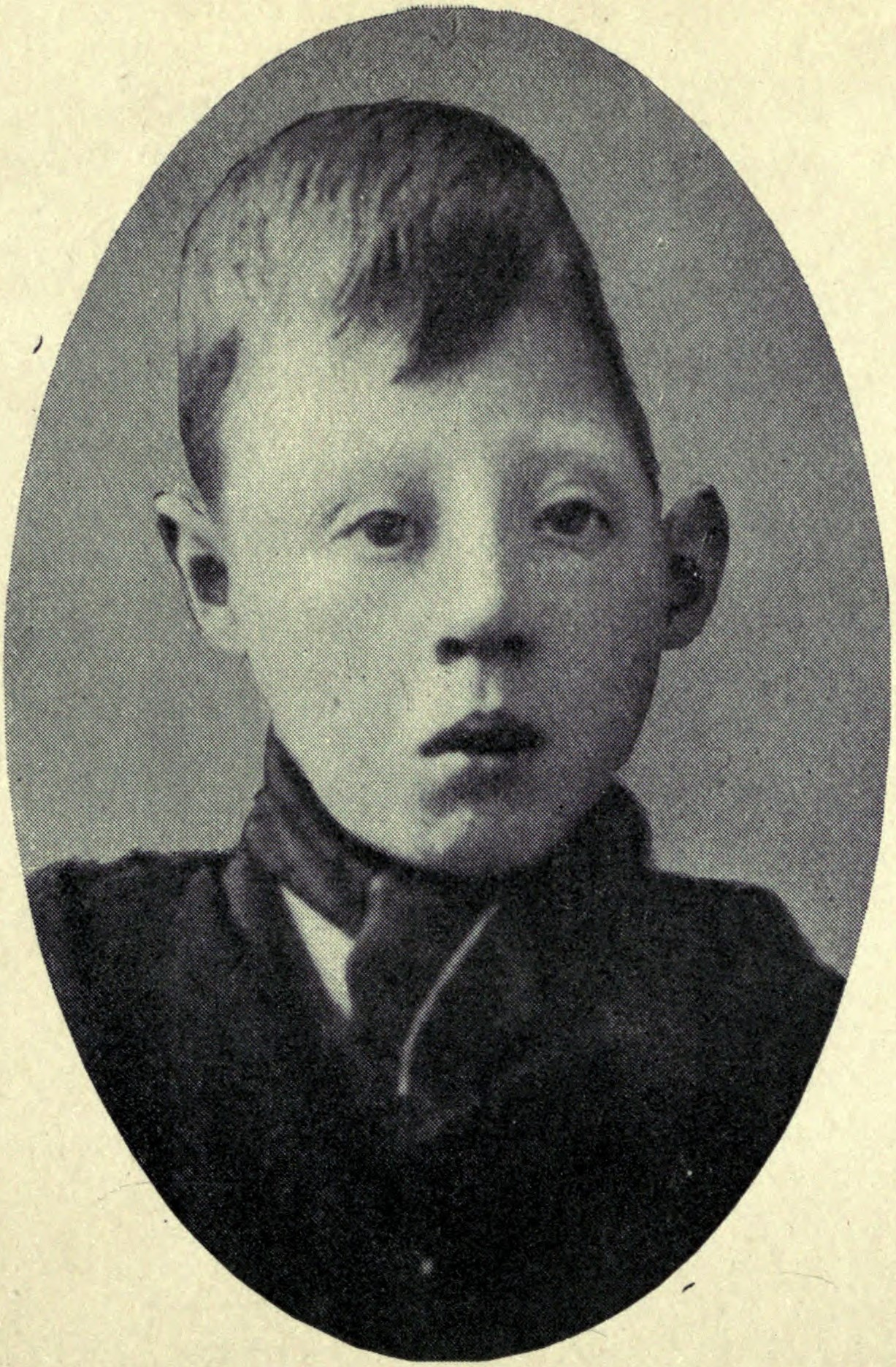
Plagiocephaly with oxycephaly in Saethre-Chotzen syndrome

- Saethre-Chotzen syndrome
- Spastic paraplegia, intellectual disability, nystagmus, and obesity
- Syndromic X-linked intellectual disability Najm type

== Diagnosis ==
A developmental and physical assessment performed by a physician or a pediatric specialist is recommended. Often, imaging is obtained if the diagnosis is questionable to see if the baby's sutures are present or not. If the sutures are not present, craniosynostosis may be ruled into question.

It is also common for an infant with positional plagiocephaly to have misaligned ears (the ear on the affected side may be pulled forward and down and be larger or protrude more than the unaffected ear).

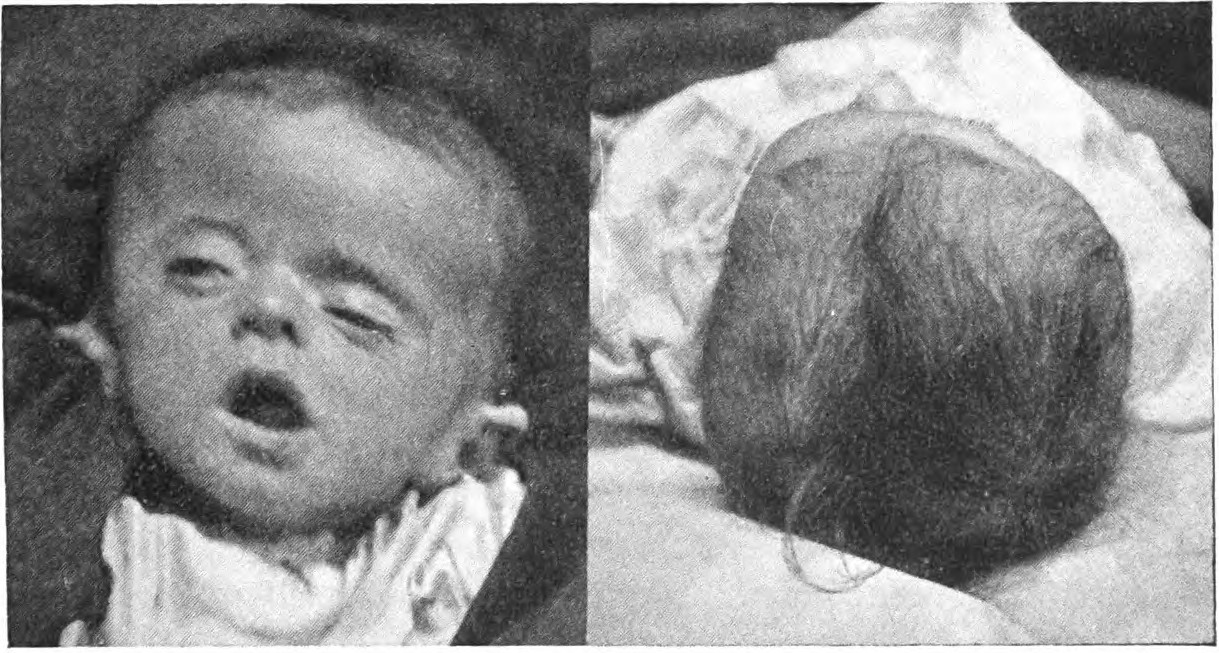
Left anterior plagiocephaly

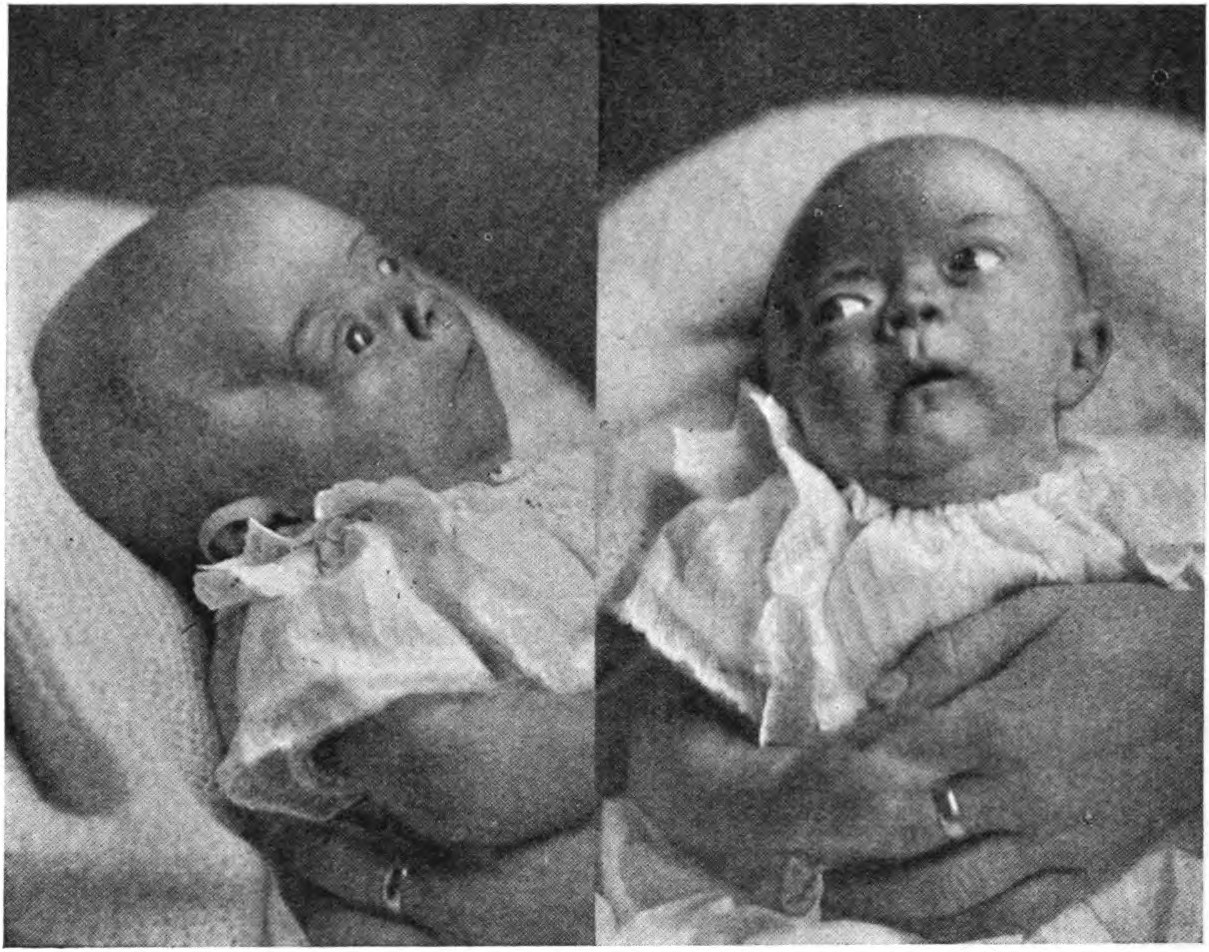
Right anterior plagiocephaly

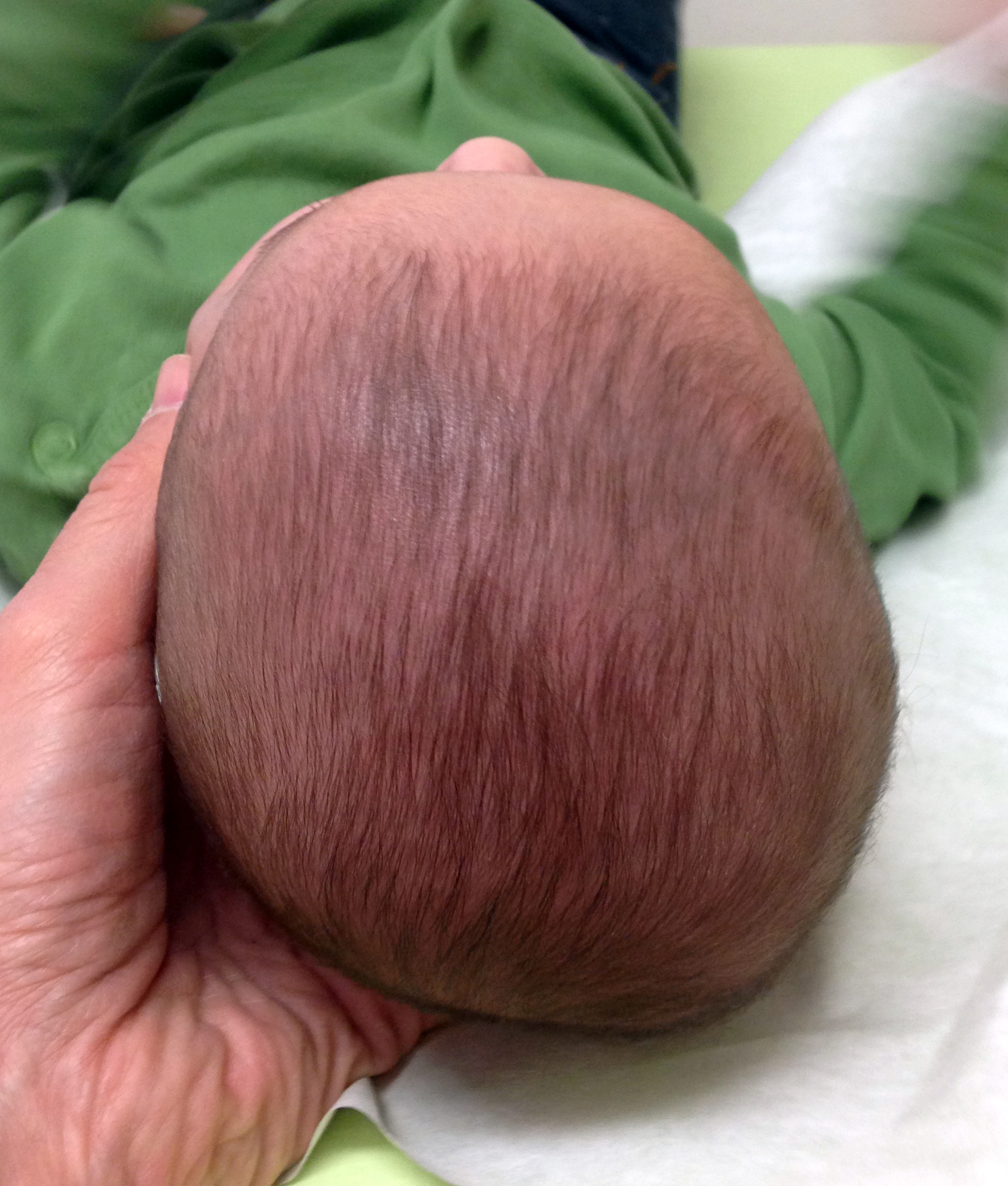
Left posterior plagiocephaly (positional case)

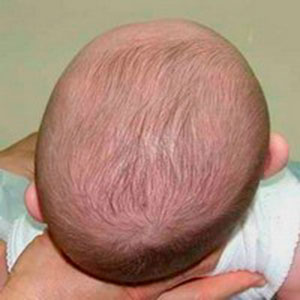
Right posterior plagiocephaly

== Prevention ==
Prevention methods include carrying the infant and giving the infant time to play on their stomach (tummy time), which may prevent the baby from progressing into moderate or severe plagiocephaly.

Letting babies crawl may also prove to be crucial in preventing plagiocephaly as it strengthens babies' spine and neck muscles. Crawling also boosts gross and fine motor skills (large and refined movements), balance, hand-eye coordination, and overall strength.

In addition, specialized mattresses are available to prevent plagiocephaly. The design of these mattresses is characterized by an ergonomic design that reduces pressure on the baby's head. These mattresses must be certified to guarantee their effectiveness.

== Treatment ==
The condition may improve to some extent as the baby grows, but in some cases, home treatment or physical therapy treatment can improve the shape of a baby's head.

Early interventions (based on the severity) are important to reduce the severity of the degree of plagiocephaly. Diagnosis is most commonly determined through clinical examination. To assess the severity of the condition and determine the best course of treatment, practitioners often use the Plagiocephaly Severity Scale.

The course of treatment is typically based on the age of the child when the diagnosis is made in conjunction with the severity of the diagnosis. If a diagnosis of mild to moderate plagiocephaly occurs before four months of age, repositioning therapy may be helpful. If the diagnosis is determined to be severe, practitioners will likely prescribe a cranial molding orthosis (helmet), which has the best results when prescribed between five and six months of age.

=== Repositioning ===
Initially, treatment usually takes the form of reducing the pressure on the affected area by repositioning the baby onto the abdomen for extended periods throughout the day.

This may include repositioning the child's head throughout the day so that the rounded side of the head is placed against the mattress, repositioning cribs and other areas that infants spend time in so that they will have to look in a different direction to see their parents or others in the room, repositioning mobiles and other toys for similar reasons, and avoiding extended time sleeping in car seats (when not in a vehicle), bouncy seats, or other supine seating which is thought to exacerbate the problem. If the child appears to have discomfort or cries when they are repositioned, a neck problem should be ruled out.

=== Helmets ===
High-quality evidence is lacking for cranial remolding orthosis (baby helmet) for the positional condition and use for this purpose is controversial. If conservative treatment is unsuccessful, helmets may help to correct abnormal head shapes. These helmets are used to treat deformational plagiocephaly, brachycephaly, scaphocephaly, and other head shape deformities in infants 3–18 months of age by gently allowing the head shape to grow back into a normal shape. This type of treatment has been used for severe deformations.

== Prognosis ==
Preliminary research indicates that some babies with plagiocephaly may comprise a high-risk group for developmental difficulties. Plagiocephaly is associated with motor and language developmental delays. While developmental delay is more commonplace among babies with plagiocephaly, it cannot be inferred that plagiocephaly is the cause of the delay.

== Etymology ==
Ancient Greek πλάγιος (plagios) 'oblique, slanting', from PIE plag- 'flat, spread', from *plak-, and Modern Latin cephal- 'head, skull, brain' (from Greek κεφαλή), together means 'flat head'.

== See also ==
- Artificial cranial deformation
- Yakovlevian torque
