= Benign paroxysmal torticollis =

Medical condition

Benign paroxysmal torticollis (BPT) is a rare medical disorder affecting infants.

== Symptoms ==
The defining characteristic of BPT is a tilting of an infant's head in recurrent episodes, for varying periods of time. Furthermore, the child's trunk may bend in the same direction as the head, giving the baby an overall curved shape; this complaint is known as tortipelvis. In addition to this, the individual may also, but not necessarily, experience vomiting, pallor, ataxia, agitation, infantile migraine, unsteadiness of gait upon learning to walk, general malaise and nystagmus.

The periods in which the child's head is tilted and other symptoms appear can last anywhere from a few minutes to a few weeks, with a frequency of anywhere from two per year to two per month.

== Causes ==
The cause of benign paroxysmal torticollis in infants is thought to be migrainous. More than 50% of infants have a family history of migraine in first degree relatives. The cause is likely to be genetic.

== Pathophysiology ==
The mechanism of action of benign paroxysmal torticollis is not yet understood. It has been suggested that unilateral vestibular dysfunction or vascular disturbance in the brain stem may be responsible for the condition.

== Diagnosis ==
Diagnosis of BPT can be difficult because it is rare.

== Treatment ==
No known treatment for BPT currently exists. However, the condition it is self-limiting and resolves after about eighteen months.

== Prognosis ==
Benign paroxysmal torticollis disappears in the early years of life with no medical intervention.

However, some cases of benign paroxysmal torticollis cases can evolve into benign paroxysmal vertigo of childhood, migrainous vertigo or typical migraines.

== History ==
The condition was first described by CH Snyder in 1969 in an article titled “Paroxysmal torticollis in infancy. A possible form of labyrinthitis.” in the American Journal of Diseases of Children.
