= Supine position =

Lying horizontally with the face and torso facing up

Supine position and prone position

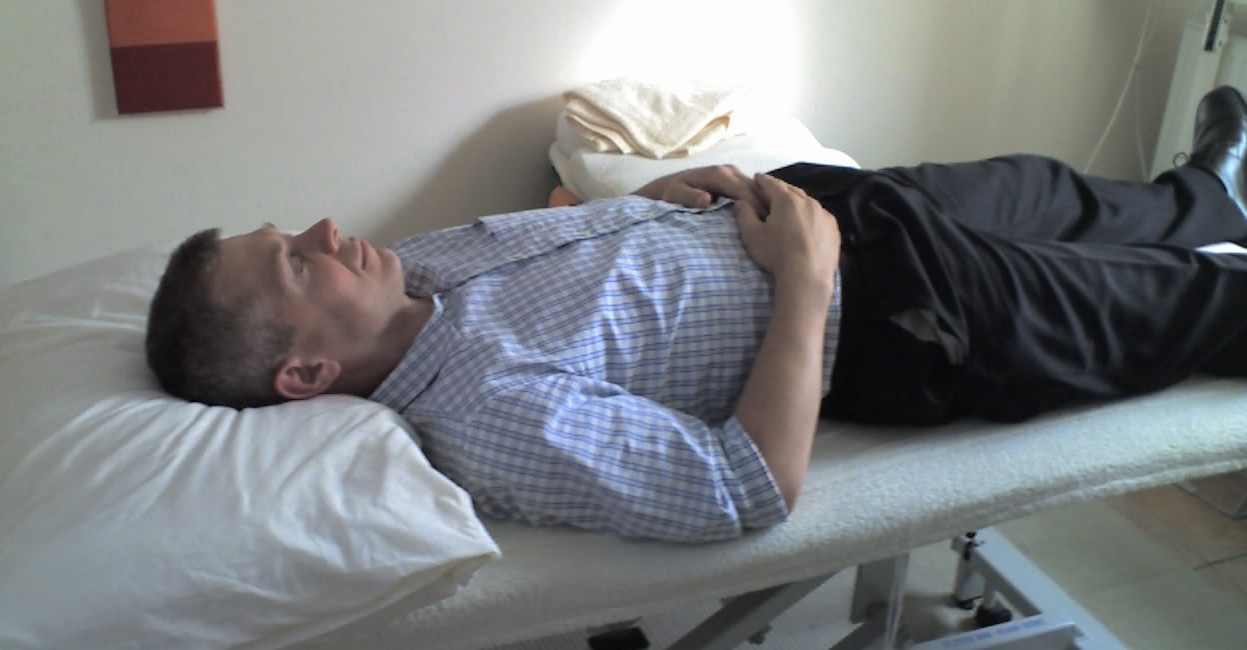
A man lying in the supine position

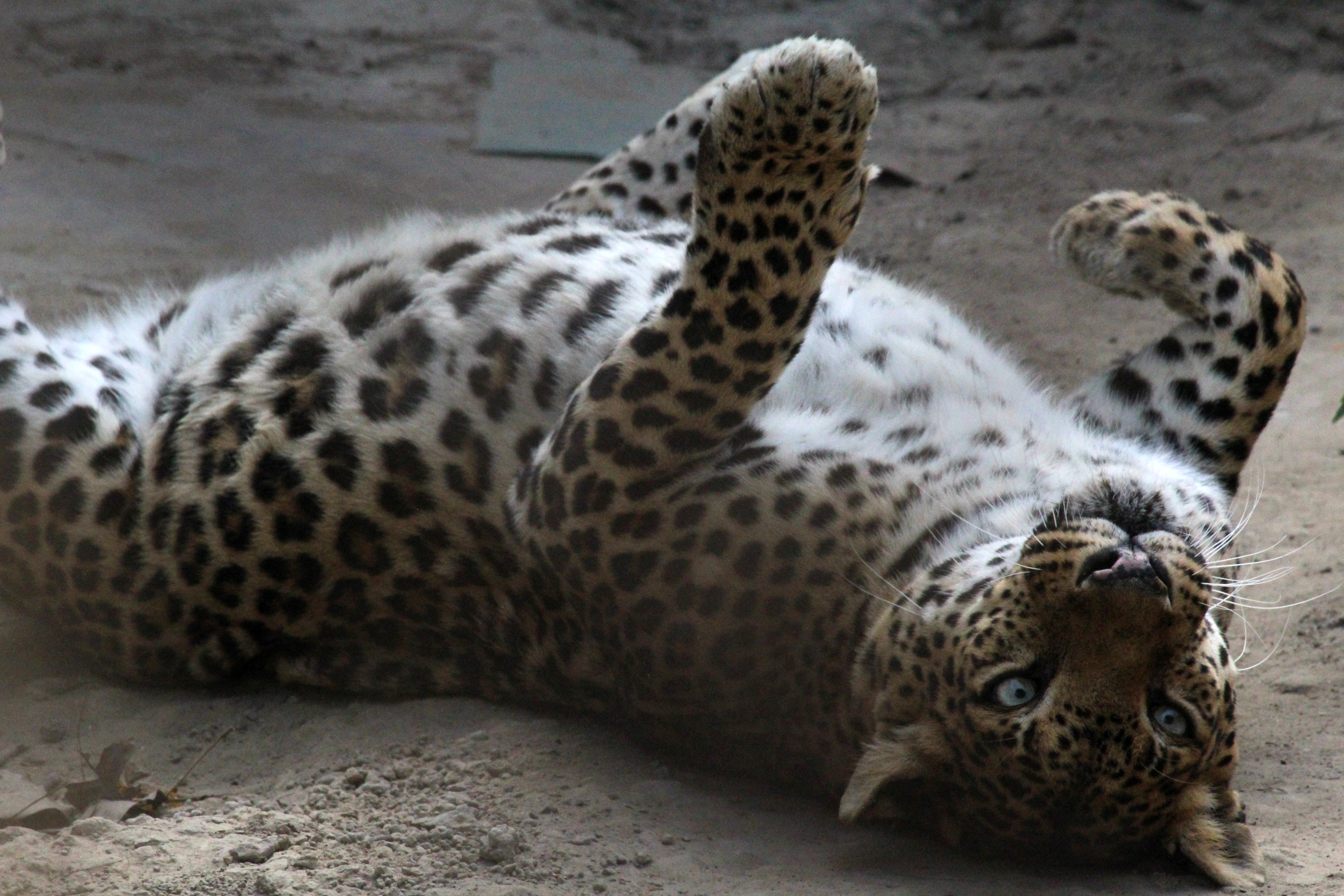
A leopard in the supine position, or dorsal recumbency in veterinary literature

The supine position (/ˈsuːpaɪn/) means lying horizontally, with the face and torso facing up, as opposed to the prone position, which is face down. When used in surgical procedures, it grants access to the peritoneal, thoracic, and pericardial regions; as well as the head, neck, and extremities.

Using anatomical terms of location, the dorsal side is down, and the ventral side is up, when supine.

== Semi-supine ==
In scientific literature "semi-supine" commonly refers to positions where the upper body is tilted (at 45° or variations) and not completely horizontal.

== Relation to sudden infant death syndrome ==
The decline in death due to sudden infant death syndrome (SIDS) is said to be attributable to having babies sleep in the supine position. The realization that infants sleeping face down, or in a prone position, had an increased mortality rate re-emerged into medical awareness at the end of the 1980s when two researchers, Susan Beal in Australia and Gus De Jonge in the Netherlands, independently noted the association.

It is believed that in the prone position babies are more at risk to re-breathe their own carbon dioxide. Because of the immature state of their central chemoreceptors, infants do not respond to the subsequent respiratory acidosis that develops. Typical non-infants realize autonomic responses of increased rate and depth of respiration (hyperventilation, yawning).

== Obstructive sleep apnea ==
Obstructive sleep apnea (OSA) is a form of sleep apnea that occurs more frequently when throat muscles relax and is most severe when individuals are sleeping in the supine position. Studies and evidence show that OSA related to sleeping in the supine position is related to the airway positioning, reduced lung volume, and the inability of airway muscles to dilate enough to compensate as the airway collapses. With individuals who have OSA, many health care providers encourage their patients to avoid the supine position while asleep and sleep laterally or sleep with the head of their bed up in a 30- or 45-degree angle.

== See also ==
- Standard anatomical position
- Lying (position)
- Prone position
- Sleep paralysis
- Sleep position
