= Attachment parenting =

Parenting philosophy

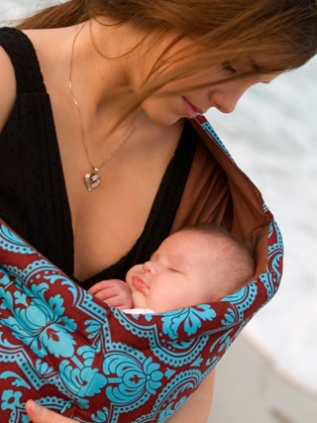
William Sears advises mothers to carry their baby on the body as often as possible.

Attachment parenting (AP) is a parenting philosophy that proposes methods aiming to promote the attachment of mother and infant not only by maximal parental empathy and responsiveness but also by continuous bodily closeness and touch. The term attachment parenting was coined by the American pediatrician William Sears. There is no conclusive body of research that shows Sears' approach to be superior to "mainstream parenting".

== History ==
=== Context ===
Although the term "attachment parenting" was first used only in the late 1990s, the concept is much older. In the United States, it became popular in the mid-20th century, when several responsiveness and love-oriented parenting philosophies entered the pedagogical mainstream, as a contrast to the more disciplinarian philosophies prevalent at the time. Attachment parenting owes many of its ideas to older teachings, such as Benjamin Spock's influential handbook The Common Sense Book of Baby and Child Care (1946). Spock had advised mothers to raise their infants according to their own common sense and with plenty of physical contact – a guideline that radically broke with the preceding doctrines of L. Emmett Holt and John B. Watson, which recommended discipline and emotional distance. Spock's book became a bestseller, and his new child-rearing concept greatly influenced the upbringing of the post-war generations.

Thirty years later, Jean Liedloff caused a stir by a "continuum concept" that she presented to the public in a book of the same title (1975). In Venezuela, Liedhoff had studied Ye'kuana people, and later she recommended to Western mothers to nurse and to wear their infants and to share their bed with them. She argued that infants, speaking in terms of evolution, have not arrived in the modernity yet, so that today's way of child care – with bottle feeding, use of cribs and baby carriages, etc. – does not meet their needs. Later, authors such as Sharon Heller and Meredith Small contributed further ethnopediatric insights.

In 1984, developmental psychologist Aletha Solter published her book The Aware Baby about a parenting philosophy that advocates attachment, extended breastfeeding, and abstinence from punishment, similarly to what William Sears later wrote; however, the point that Solter stressed most was an encouragement of the child's emotional expression to heal stress and trauma.

In the 1990s, T. Berry Brazelton invigorated the discussion. He contributed new research about the capacity of newborn infants to express themselves and their emotions, sensitized parents for these signals, and encouraged them – just like Spock – to follow their own judgment.

== Controversy ==
Since 2012, there has been a controversy about Sears' positions which has been mostly carried out in the English-speaking world.

It began in 2012 with a cover picture on Time magazine that showed a Californian mother breastfeeding her almost 4-year-old. In the accompanying article "The Man Who Remade Motherhood", journalist Kate Pickert tried to argue that even if William Sears' positions are much less radical than those of his followers, they are 'misogynistic' and give mothers a chronically guilty conscience, and that they frequently disagree with relevant research results. The cover picture and article became the starting point of disputes in many media, criticizing Pickert.

At the same time, attachment parenting attracted attention of sociologists like Ellie Lee, Charlotte Faircloth, Jan Macvarish, and Frank Furedi who described the phenomenon an example of 21st century "Parental Determinism". As early as in 1996, sociologist Sharon Hays had described the sociocultural phenomenon of an "Intensive Mothering"; with attachment parenting, this phenomenon finally became tangible and recognizable. In 2004, media critic Susan J. Douglas and philosopher Meredith W. Michaels followed with their account of a "New Momism".

=== Time cover picture and article ===
The Time magazine cover picture and article were published May 21, 2012.

=== Origin ===
William Sears, a pediatrician, came upon the term "attachment parenting" in 1982 by reading Liedloff. Initially, he referred to his new philosophy as "the new continuum concept" and "immersion mothering". When he published his book Creative Parenting in 1982, the concept was largely elaborate already. The "7 Baby-Bs" were not explicitly presented as a canon yet, but as basic elements of a new parenting philosophy, they were distinctly clear even at that early point. In 1985, William Sears and his wife Martha Sears began to link the concept – ex post – with attachment theory which they had begun to recognize at that time. From then on, they used the term "attachment parenting".

I realized we needed to change the term to something more positive, so we came up with AP, since the Attachment Theory literature was so well researched and documented, by John Bowlby and others.

— Martha Sears

In 1993, William Sears and Martha Sears published The Baby Book which became the first comprehensive manual for AP-parents and which was occasionally dubbed "the attachment parenting bible". The first attachment parenting organization, Attachment Parenting International, formed in 1994 in Alpharetta, Georgia, and was founded by Lysa Parker and Barbara Nicholson. The first book that carried the term attachment parenting in the title was written by Tammy Frissell-Deppe, a mother who gave an account of her personal experiences and of those of her friends and acquaintances. In 1999, blogger Katie Allison Granju followed with another book, to which William Sears contributed a foreword, before he, together with Martha Sears, published his own work, The Attachment Parenting Book in 2001. All three books stood – with their opposition against a crude behavioristic infant anthropology – in the tradition of Spock, but radicalized the concept of a contingency-oriented parenting on the one hand, and incorporated Liedloff's idea of an instinct-guided resp. "natural" childrearing on the other hand.

In the same year as Sears and Sears' Attachment Parenting Book, Jan Hunt published her essay collection The Natural Child. Parenting from the Heart. Hunt who sees herself as a child advocate, campaigned in this book not only for attachment parenting, but also for unschooling. A more recent AP proponent is parenting advisor Naomi Aldort, who published her book Raising Our Children, Raising Ourselves in 2006.

== In practice ==
=== Baby Reading ===
Consistent with the founders of attachment theory, especially Mary Ainsworth, William Sears teaches that a strong mother-child-attachment emerges from contingency, that is, when mother and child are attuned to each other, which in turn is based on the mother's sensitivity. Since the mother "reads" the signals of her infant, Sears speaks in this context of "baby reading". Another metaphor that he uses is "to be in the groove".

=== The Seven B's ===
William Sears strongly believes in the existence of child rearing practices that support "baby reading" and that augment maternal sensitivity. The methods of attachment parenting include seven practices/principles that according to Sears form a "synergetic" ensemble and that are based on the child's "biological needs".

- Birth bonding
- Breastfeeding
- Baby wearing
- Bedding close to baby
- Belief in the language value of your baby's cry
- Beware of baby trainers
- Balance

Until 1999, Sears named only five Baby Bs. The last two were only added in 2001 with the publication of the Attachment Parenting Book.

==== Birth bonding ====
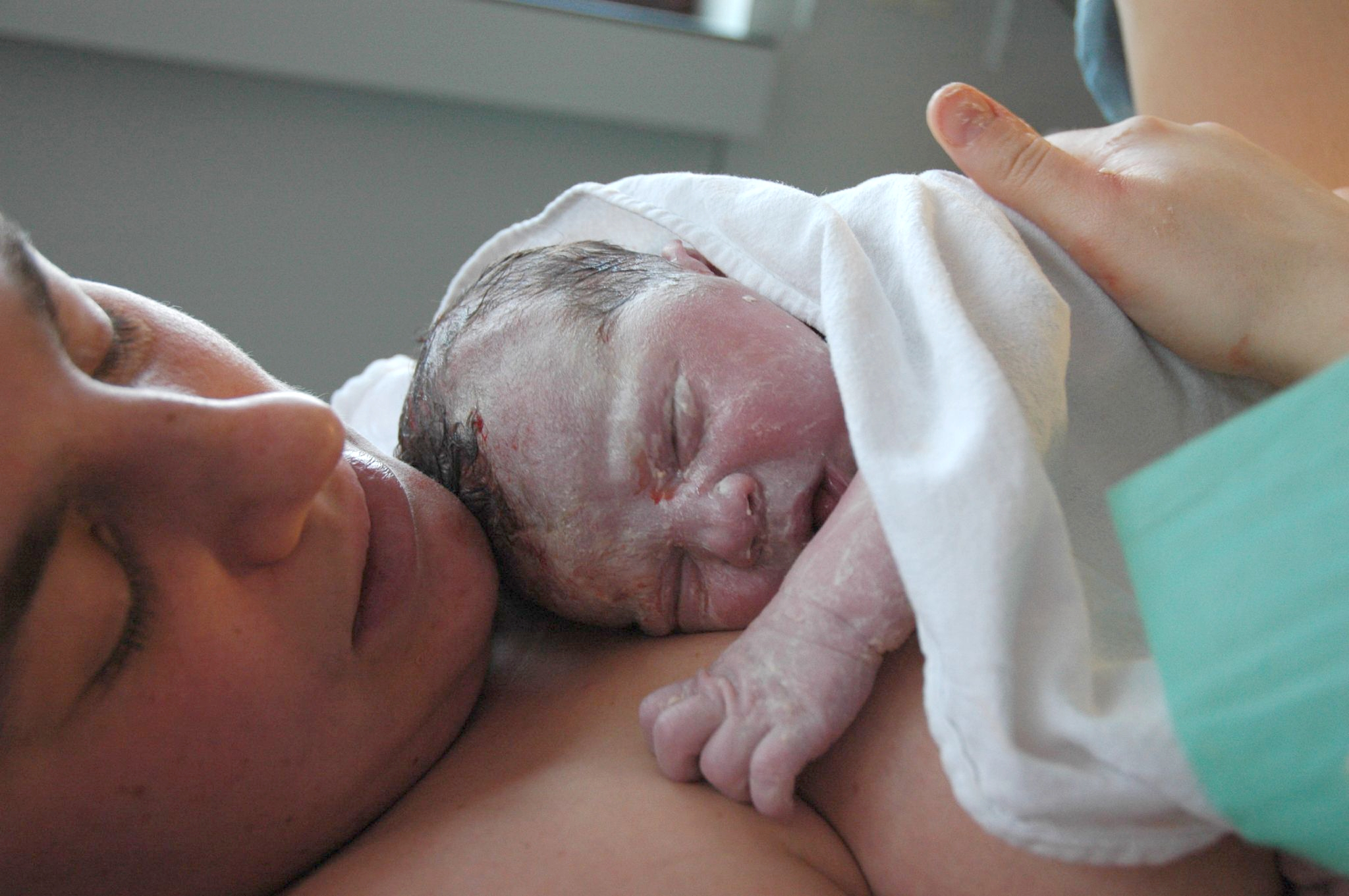
Mother with newborn

William Sears postulates the existence of a brief time slot immediately after birth during which the newborn is in a "quiet alert state" and particularly accessible for bonding. He refers to this birth bonding as "imprinting" and bases himself on a study by Drs. Marshall Klaus and John Kennell from 1967; however, Klaus and Kennell later modified their original assumptions, including the one cited by Sears. Sears advises women to abstain from analgesics during childbirth, since those drug the child, too, and according to Sears interfere with the birth bonding.

==== Breastfeeding ====
William Sears argues that breastfeeding greatly accommodates mother-child-attachment because it triggers the release of oxytocin in the mother which supports her emotional bonding with the child, notably in the first ten days after childbirth. In opposition to bottle feeding which tends to be done in three to four hour intervals. Breastfeeding enables the mother to perceive the child's moods and needs exactly. Since the half-life period of the hormones prolactin and oxytocin (which promote bonding) are very short, Sears recommends to breastfeed very frequently, newborns in particular (8 to 12 times a day). He claims that the hours between 1 am and 6 am are the most beneficial for breastfeeding. In general, Sears argues that breastfeeding is beneficial for the health of both child and mother. He claims that infants up to six months should be exclusively fed with breast milk, since he believes that, at that age, children are allergic to all other foods.

William and Martha Sears advise mothers to breastfeed every child for 1–4 years:

While breastfeeding for only a few months is the cultural norm for Western Society, what we know about breastfeeding in primitive cultures and weaning times for other mammals that human infants were designed to breastfeed for several years.

— Bill Sears, Martha Sears

William Sears advocates extended breastfeeding, since he is convinced that breastfeeding supports attachment even of older children and that it is a valid instrument to comfort older children or to bring mother and child together on turbulent days. Neither does he object nighttime breastfeeding of toddlers. As early as in 1992, Norma Jane Bumgarner had campaigned for extended breastfeeding.

Sears' recommendations are in accordance with the WHO guidelines on breastfeeding, which recommend exclusive breastfeeding in the first six months and complementary breastfeeding in the first two years for all countries.

Since breastfeeding studies are, for ethical reasons, never conducted as randomized controlled trials, critics have repeatedly suspected that studies may have produced the superiority of breastfeeding as an artifact. Both the physical, emotional and mental development of children and the preferences of women for a feeding method are strongly determined by socioeconomical factors such as the mother's ethnicity, social class, and education. If researchers go without randomization and turn a blind eye to those possible alternative factors, they fundamentally run a risk to falsely credit the feeding method for effects of socioeconomic factors. A loophole from this problem was first presented by Cynthia G. Colen (Ohio State University), who successfully factored out socioeconomical determinants by comparing siblings only; her study demonstrated that formula fed children showed only minimal differences to their breastfed siblings, insofar as their physical, emotional and mental thriving was concerned.

William Sears' assumptions about the benefit of breastfeeding for the attachment have been studied. In 2006, John R. Britton and a research team (Kaiser Permanente) found that highly sensitive mothers are more likely than less sensitive mothers to breastfeed and to breastfeed over a long time period. However, the study showed no effect of the feeding method on the attachment quality.

==== Baby wearing ====
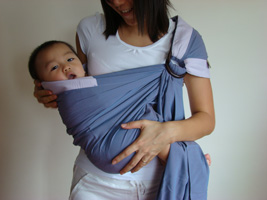
A child in a sling

Sears advises mothers to wear infants on the body as many hours during the day as possible, for example in a sling. He argues that this practice makes the child happy and allows the mother to involve the child into everything she does and never to lose sight of the child. He advises working mothers to wear the child at least 4–5 hours every night in order to make good for her absence during the day.

In 1990, a research team from New York revealed in a randomized study that children of lower class mothers who to the age of 13 months spent a lot of time in a child carrier on their mother's body showed significantly more frequently a secure attachment as defined by Ainsworth than the control group children, who spend more time in an infant seat. For middle-class families, an equivalent study doesn't exist yet.

Sears argues furthermore that baby wearing exercises the child's sense of balance; since a child who is worn on the mother's experiences more of her conversations, he believes that baby wearing is also beneficial for the child's language acquisition. However, there are not studies that confirm such effects.

It is undisputed that baby wearing can calm children down. Infants cry the most at the age of six weeks; in 1986, a research team at McGill University showed in a randomized study that infants of that age cried significantly less if their parents wore them a lot on the body during the day. Sears recommends babywearing for the purpose of settling a baby to sleep, too. He approves on the use of a sling up to the age of three, since child wearing can also be used to calm a misbehaving toddler down. Other pediatricians find it disputable to wear children beyond the age of nine months permanently on the body, arguing that this is against the child's natural desire for autonomy.

==== Co-sleeping ====
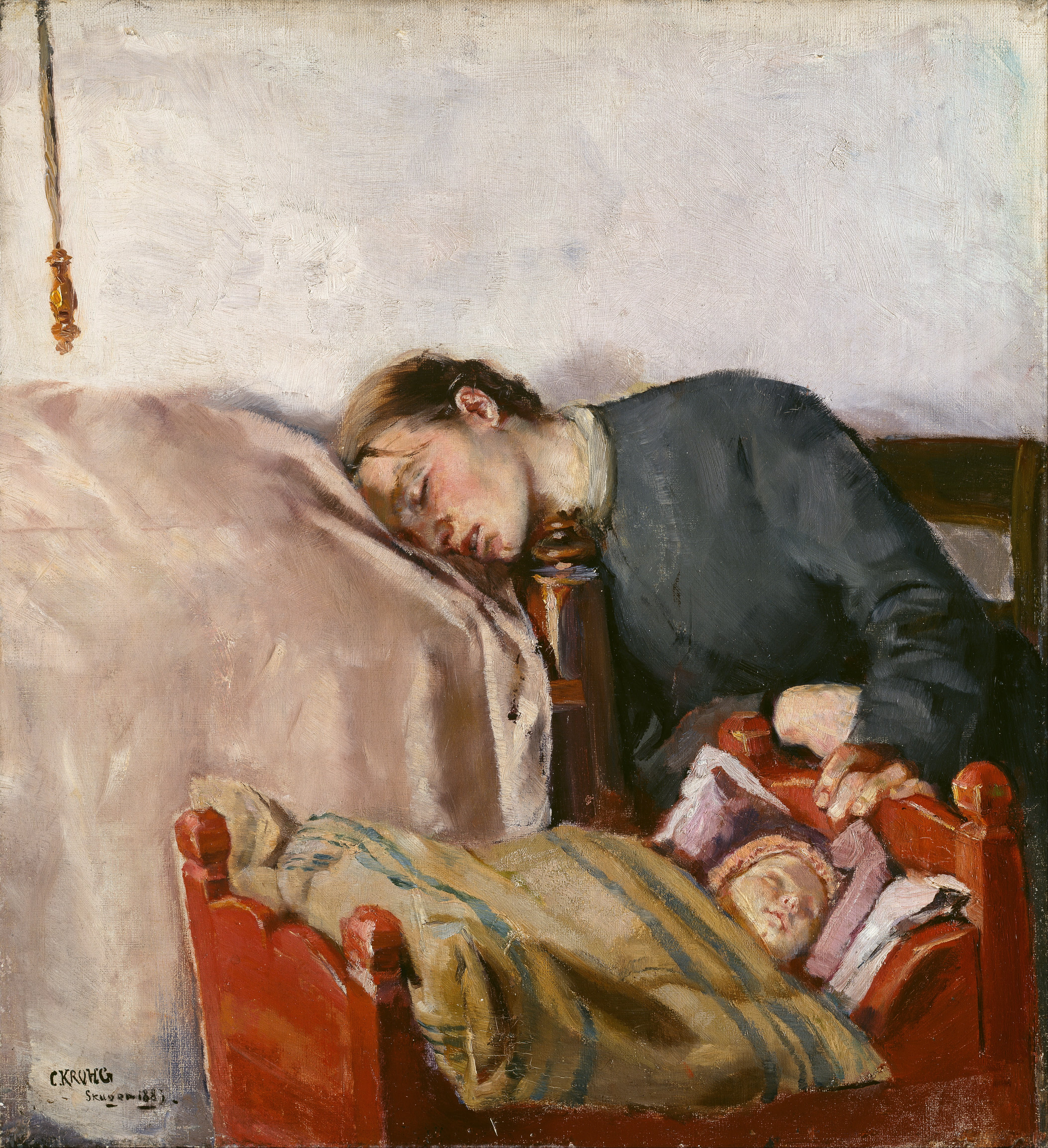
Christian Krohg: Mother and Child, 1883

William Sears states that any sleeping arrangement that a family practices is acceptable as long as it works; but he advises mother to sleep close to the child. He thinks of co-sleeping as the ideal arrangement and refers to it as the nighttime equivalent of baby wearing: co-sleeping supports, in his opinion, the mother-child-attachment, makes breastfeeding more convenient, and prevents not only separation anxiety, but also SIDS Sears is convinced that mother and child, in spite of frequent nighttime breastfeeding, have the best sleep when they sleep close together. He is also convinced that due to the extra nighttime feedings, a child that sleeps close to the mother thrives better than a child "crying, alone, behind bars". Moreover, Katie Allison Granju argued that co-sleeping is beneficial for children, too, because it gives children a vivid notion of the concept of bedtime.

The idea of co-sleeping was not new in modern Western societies; as early as in 1976, Tine Thevenin had campaigned for the "family bed". Sears doesn't see a problem when a three-year-old still shares their mother's bed every night. He doesn't even object if a child is in the habit of spending the whole night with her mother's nipple in her mouth, except when the mother really feels uncomfortable. Sears advises working mothers to co-sleep on all accounts in order to compensate the child for her daytime absence.

Sudden infant death syndrome (SIDS) occurs with an incidence of roughly 33 per 100,000 live births. James J. McKenna studied five pairs of co-sleeping mothers and infants and found them to synchronize nighttime arousals. With the study, he raised the questions of 1) whether there's a relationship between these synchronized nighttime waking and breathing stability and 2) whether this could be related to some forms of SIDS. Studies that investigate SIDS directly have shown that co-sleeping raises the SIDS risk instead of lowering it. Things that increase the risk of SIDS include: 1) when the infant is younger than four months, 2) the parents were especially tired, 3) the parents consumed alcohol, 4) parents were smokers, 5) slept on a sofa, or 6) the baby was in a duvet. Even in the absence of these risk factors, studies have still shown there to be an increased risk of SIDS when bed sharing. The U.S. Consumer Product Safety Commission also warns against co-sleeping. Attachment Parenting International issued a response which stated that the data referenced in the Consumer Product Safety Commission statement were unreliable, and that co-sponsors of the campaign had created a conflict of interest. The American Academy of Pediatrics' policy on SIDS prevention opposes bed-sharing with infants, although room-sharing is encouraged.

In general, research doesn't confirm an advantage of co-sleeping over separate beds. A meta study from Israel has pointed out in 2000 that sleeping aids such as pacifiers and teddy bears significantly improve the child's sleep, while co-sleeping and frequent nighttime breastfeeding if anything hinder the formation of wholesome sleeping patterns. Co-sleeping mothers breastfeed three times as frequently during the night as mothers who have their bed for themselves. The most important factor for a child to get a good sleep proved to be the mother's emotional accessibility, not her permanent physical closeness.

==== "Crying is an attachment tool" ====
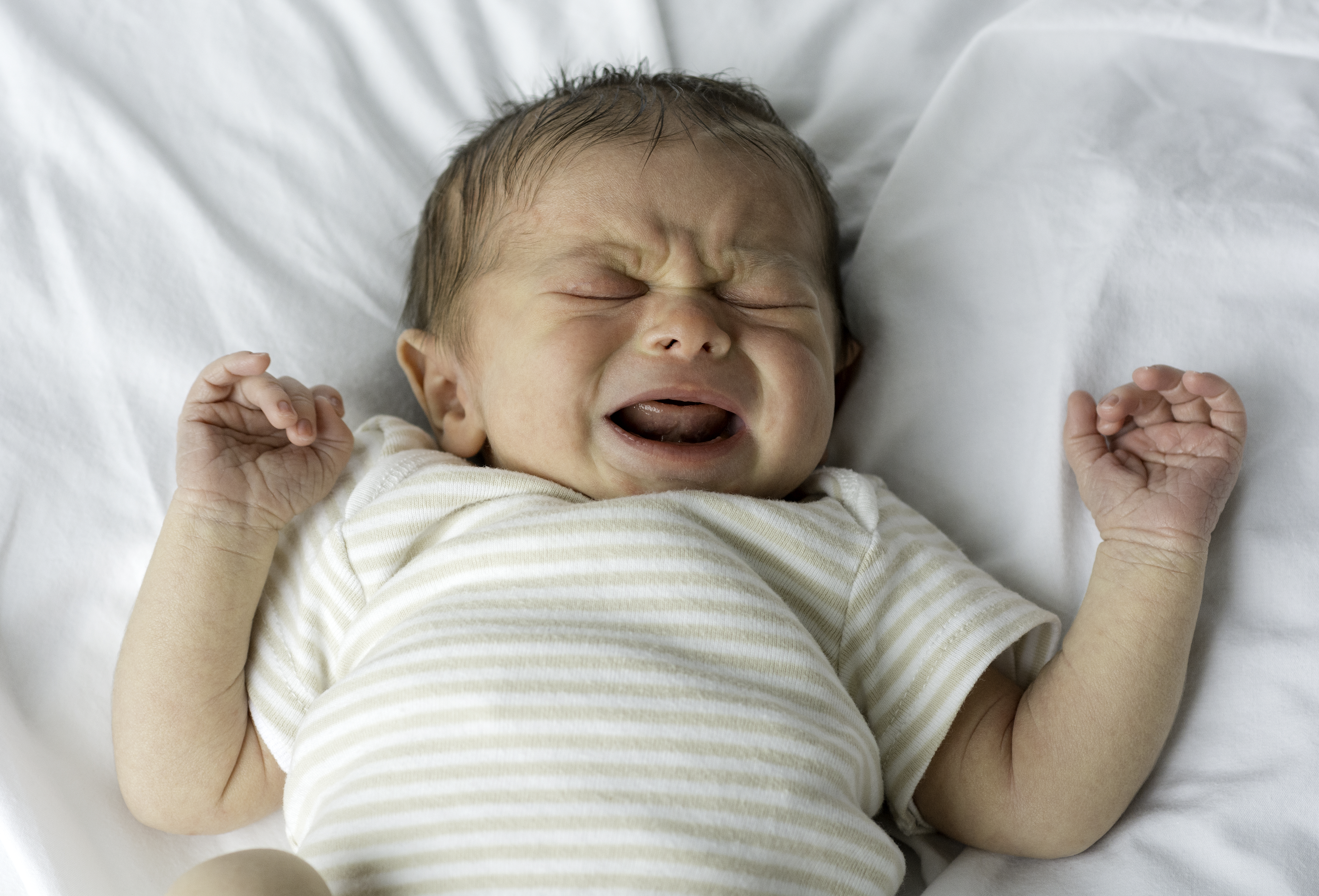
Crying newborn

William Sears determines crying as the child's pivotal mean of self-expression. Parents are challenged to "read" the crying – which is initially generalized – and to provide the child with empathic feedback in order to help them to differentiate and elaborate the repertoire of their signals gradually. Furthermore, he recommends prevention of crying: parents are advised not only to practice breastfeeding, baby wearing and co-sleeping as much as possible, but also to get into the habit of properly responding to the early warning signals so that crying doesn't happen in the first place. Likewise, parents must teach their child that some trivial occasions are no cause for alarm at all.

In general, Sears argues that infants should never be left crying because this would harm them. But as early as in 1962, T. Berry Brazelton had shown in a study that a certain amount of crying in young infants does not indicate emotional or physical problems, but is to be considered normal and harmless.

==== No sleep training ====
William Sears names two reasons why infants should not undergo sleep training: he believes that infant training hardens the mother emotionally and that children who underwent such training do not sleep better but merely resign and become apathetic, a state that he refers to as "shut down syndrome", although a condition of this name doesn't exist in DSM or ICD. Frissell-Deppe and Granju believe that sleep training is traumatic for children.

Sears argues that advocates of sleep training are professionally incompetent and merely business oriented, and that there is no scientific proof that sleep training is beneficial for children.

==== Balance ====
For parents and particularly for mothers, attachment parenting is more strenuous and demanding than most other present-day ways of parenting, placing high responsibility on them without allowing for a support network of helpful friends or family. William Sears is fully aware of the arduousness of the methods. He suggests a whole package of measures that aim to prevent an emotional burnout of the mother, like the prioritization and delegation of duties and responsibilities, streamlining of daily routines, and collaboration between both parents. Sears advises mothers to turn to a psychotherapist if necessary, but to stick to attachment parenting at all costs.

Sears finds the burden of attachment parenting just and reasonable, and describes the opponents of this philosophy as "authoritarian males ... caught up in their role of advice giver". Granju, too, takes a swipe at "the male dominated 'scientific' childcare guidance". She argues that the low reputation that breastfeeding, namely extended breastfeeding in the Western world has, arises from a sexualization of the female breast: from the perspective of a sexist society, the breast "belongs" to men, not to children. Mayim Bialik, too, considers attachment a feminist option, since it constitutes an alternative to the – male dominated – superiority of physicians who traditionally shaped the spheres of pregnancy, childbirth, and motherhood.

Since attachment parenting poses a considerable challenge to the reconcilability of motherhood and female career, the philosophy has been greatly criticized, most notably in the context of the attachment parenting controversy from 2012.

=== Parental authority ===
Sears states that in attachment families, parents and children practice a highly developed and sophisticated type of communication that makes it unnecessary for parents to use practices such as scolding; often, all it takes is a mere frown. He is convinced that children who trust their parents are cooperative and do not resist parental guidance. He therefore recommends positive discipline. But in contrast to many AP parents, he is not fundamentally opposed to confrontative methods (firm, corrective response), and he gives high significance to child obedience and conscience. Sears is a decided advocate for authoritative parenting.

Some proponents advocate the combination of attachment theory with discipline to create specifically "sensitive discipline".

== In theory ==
=== Claim ===
Like Benjamin Spock before them, William and Martha Sears consider their parenting philosophy as a common sense and instinct-guided ad hoc way of parenting. In contrast to Spock who derived his ideas in a straight line from Freud's psychoanalysis, the Searses in fact did not start out from a theory; even the tie to attachment theory was only engineered ex post, when the philosophy was already largely complete. Apart from Liedloff's rather eclectic thoughts, they came to their ideas mainly from their own personal impressions:

Our ideas about attachment parenting are based on thirty-plus years of parenting our own eight children and observing moms and dads whose parenting choices seemed to make sense and whose children we liked. We have witnessed the effects this approach to parenting has on children.

— Bill Sears, Martha Sears

Despite the lack of a consistent theory, William and Martha Sears consider attachment parenting scientifically proven:

AP is not only common sense, but also supported by science.

— Bill Sears, Martha Sears

Their belief in such scientific proof doesn't hinder the Searses to advise AP parents not to engage in discussions with AP critics. They also favor some science while they refuse other:

Science says: Good Science Backs AP.

— Bill Sears, Martha Sears

=== Fundamental terms and criticism ===
Critics consider a lack of a consistent theoretical foundation – notably the lack of precise definitions of the fundamental terms – a shortcoming of the attachment parenting concept.

==== Sensitivity ====
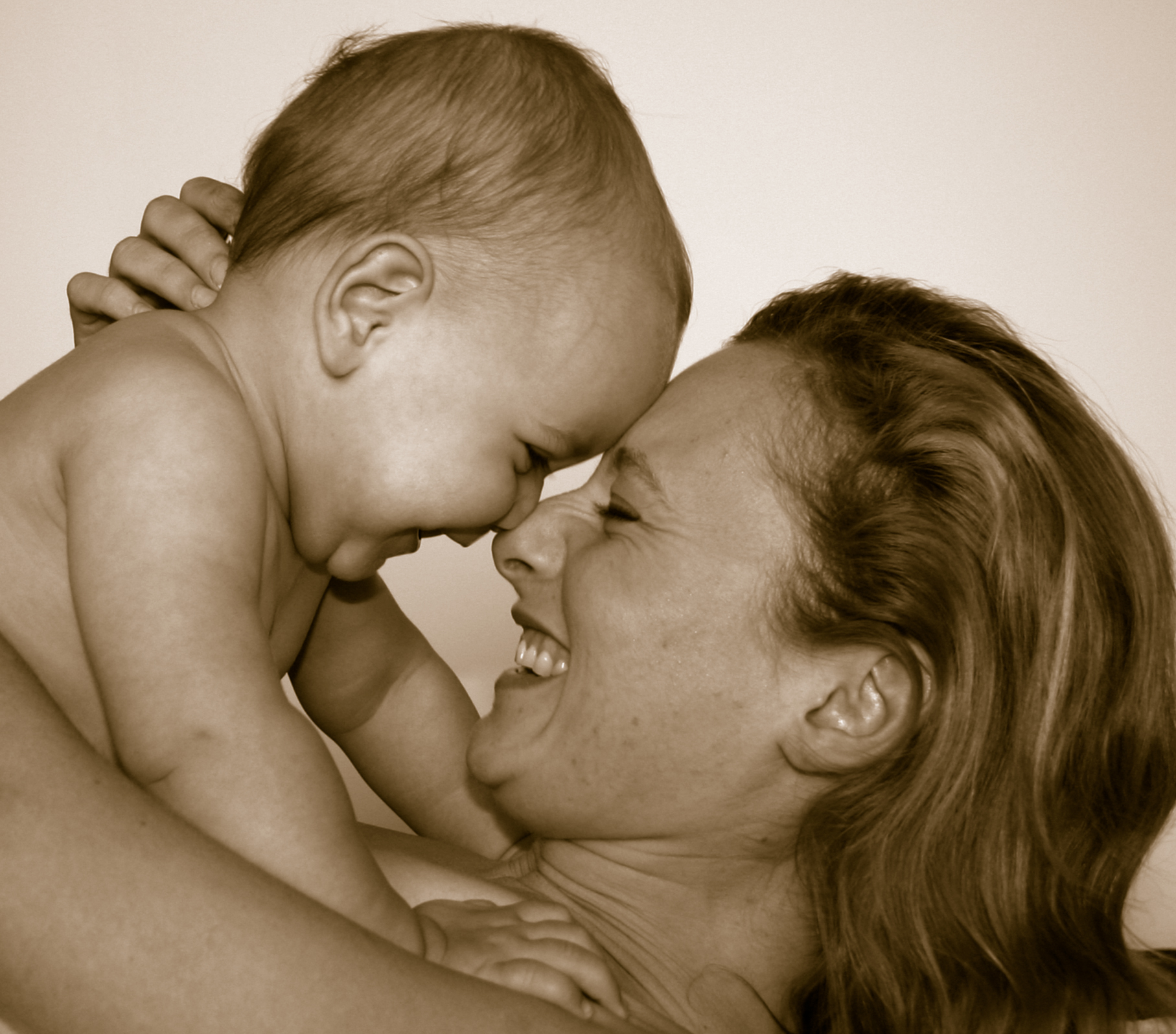
Contingency: Mother and child in emotional harmony

The concept of mutual emotional fine-tuning has been known in psychology since Franz Mesmer, who introduced it under the term "rapport", before Freud adopted it for psychoanalysis. In relation to the mother-child-tie, behaviorists and developmental psychologists rather speak of "contingency" today; Daniel Stern coined the term "attunement", too.

For Williams Sears, attachment parenting is a kind of parenting that is radically characterized by maternal responsivity. For that, he adopted Mary Ainsworth's term of "maternal sensitivity": The woman directs her attention completely on the child ("babyreading") and responds continuously to every signal that the child sends; the result is a state of harmony between mother and child that leads to mutual attachment. Sears believes that the maternal "tuning-in" begins during pregnancy already.

==== Attachment ====
Within the framework of infant cognitive development studies, the child's attachment to the parents has been well researched. Back in 1958, Harry Harlow demonstrated that baby monkeys would choose comfort and affection over food. As early as in the late 1940s, Donald Winnicott gave a detailed account of the development of the child's attachment; at the latest after the sixth month, healthy children begin to disengage from the mother-child symbiosis quite normally. However, it was Margaret Mahler who gave the most accurate description of the attachment development during the first three years. William Sears' publications reveal no knowledge of this relevant literature.

Sears' use of the term "attachment" is merely colloquial. He applies it synonymously with terms like trust, harmony, closeness, bonding, love bonds, and connection: "Attachment describes the whole caregiving relationship between mother or father and baby." He mentions that attachment emerges from contingency, but in his further accounts, he never differentiates between attachment and contingency. The readers must therefore assume that attachment is a deeply vulnerable state that never stabilizes and that requires constant reestablishment through incessant sensitivity.

Later in the book, in contradiction to his own preceding statements, Sears reassures adoptive parents: "Don't worry about the attachment your child may have 'missed' in foster care. Infants are extremely resilient."

==== Insecure attachment ====
The establishment of a secure mother-child attachment is the declared and pivotal goal of attachment parenting.

In numerous scientific studies, the normal development of attachment has been well documented. The same applies for deviant or pathological developments. Problematic or disturbed attachment has been described in three contexts:

- In extreme and rare conditions, the child may not form an attachment at all and may suffer from reactive attachment disorder. Children who suffer from reactive attachment disorder have often experienced extremely traumatic childhoods with a lot of neglect and abuse. An example of such a case is for children in orphanages in Romania where babies have been known to be left for 18–20 hours by themselves in their cribs. As adults, people with reactive attachment disorder show severe emotional abnormalities and a severely impaired social behavior.
- Mary Ainsworth described a type of disorganized attachment that appears, too, mostly in children who suffered child abuse; boys are more frequently affected than girls. Those children show distress, and their mothers reveal an obvious lack of empathy. Disorganized attachment is no mental disturbance in terms of ICD, but a type of behavior that can be observed in the strange situation test only. In "normal" middle-class families, about 15% of all children show a disorganized attachment. In social problem groups, the percentage can be significantly higher.

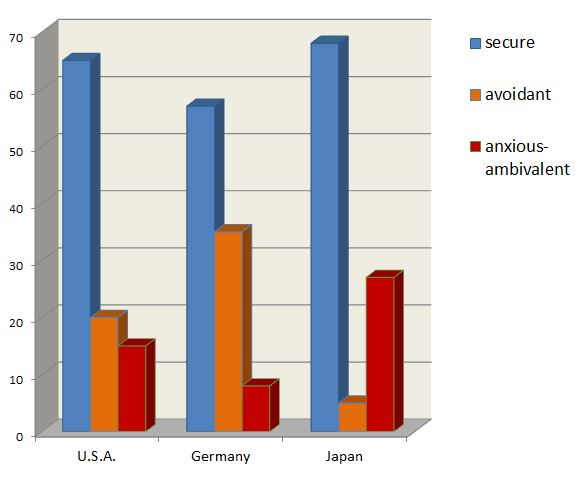
Secure, insecure-avoidant, and insecure-ambivalent attachment in toddlers in the U.S., in Germany, and Japan

- A third group of problematic attachment is constituted by the types of insecure-avoidant and insecure-ambivalent attachment, both described by Mary Ainsworth, too. Children who are insecurely attached behave in the strange situation test either aloof towards their mothers, or they fluctuate between clinginess and rejection. As Beatrice Beebe (Columbia University) has substantiated in a study in 2010, these children experience from their mothers constantly behavior like under- or overstimulation, intrusiveness, or volatility. Nonetheless, their mothers displayed empathy and were fully able to respond to their children's emotional expressions appropriately; the children showed no signs of emotional distress. Insecure attachment as defined by Ainsworth is very common and applies for example in the U. S. to about one out of three children.

William Sears uses the terms "lesser quality of attachment", "insecure attachment", and "non-attachment" synonymously. His formulations do not reveal which kind of problematic attachment is meant: reactive attachment disorder (ICD), disorganized attachment (Ainsworth) or the two forms of insecure attachment (Ainsworth). Still in 1982, he mentioned "diseases of non-attachment" not referring to the attachment theorists Bowlby and Ainsworth, but to Selma Fraiberg, a psychoanalyst who studied blindly born children in the 1970s. Due to the vague description of problematic attachment, Sears and AP organizations who use his criteria have been reproached to produce a high rate of false positives. The same applies to definitions of attachment therapy, a concept that frequently appears to be partially overlapping with attachment parenting. Attachment parenting supporters have distanced themselves from attachment therapy, notably from its methods, but not from its diagnostic criteria.

Sears offers a discrimination between (good) attachment and (bad) enmeshment, but again without explaining to his readers how exactly they can identify the difference.

There is no conclusive body of research that shows Sears' approach to be superior to "mainstream parenting". In field studies in Uganda, Ainsworth has observed that sometimes even children who spend plenty of time with their mothers and who were breastfed on cue, developed signs of insecure attachment; she concluded that it is not the quantity of mother-child interaction that determines the attachment type, but the quality. It is, therefore, not practices like co-sleeping, babywearing or feeding on cue that Ainsworth identifies as the crucial determinant for a secure attachment, but the maternal sensitivity.

==== Need ====
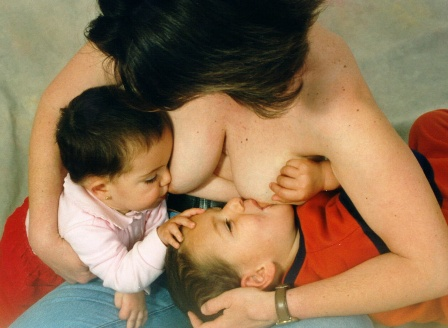
William Sears assumes that even toddlers can have a need for breastfeeding.

The theoretical starting point of attachment parenting – the idea of contingency – would suggest a concept of the infant as a creature who is essentially defined by their feelings and communication. William Sears, though, defines infants even more essentially by their needs. Need is therefore another basic term; attachment parenting means quintessentially to attend to the child's needs.

As early as in the 1940s, psychologists such as Abraham Maslow shaped detailed models of the human needs; ever since, scientists have made a clear distinction between needs on the one hand and desires on the other hand. In 2000, T. Berry Brazelton, a pioneer in the field of newborn psychology, and child psychiatrist Stanley Greenspan published their book The Irreducible Needs of Children, in which they re-assessed the term for pediatrics. When the Searses published their Attachment Parenting Book one year later, they responded neither to Maslow nor to Brazelton and Greenspan, but used the word need merely in a colloquial sense. Although they stressed that parents must distinguish between needs and desires of children, in particular of older children, they denied their readers a guideline of how to tell needs and desires apart. With a view to infants, they believe that needs and desires are plainly identical. In general, they use both terms synonymously. With a view to toddlers, they often phrase it: a child is not ready yet (to do without breastfeeding, without co-sleeping, etc.); but even in contexts like these, they speak of needs, too.

Opponents of attachment parenting have questioned that the behavior of a 3½ year old who still demands to nurse can actually be classified as a need. Most likely the child is seeking consolation. To give a child comfort is an important parental responsibility; but parents are just as well liable to teach their child to take heart by their own power.

==== Stress ====
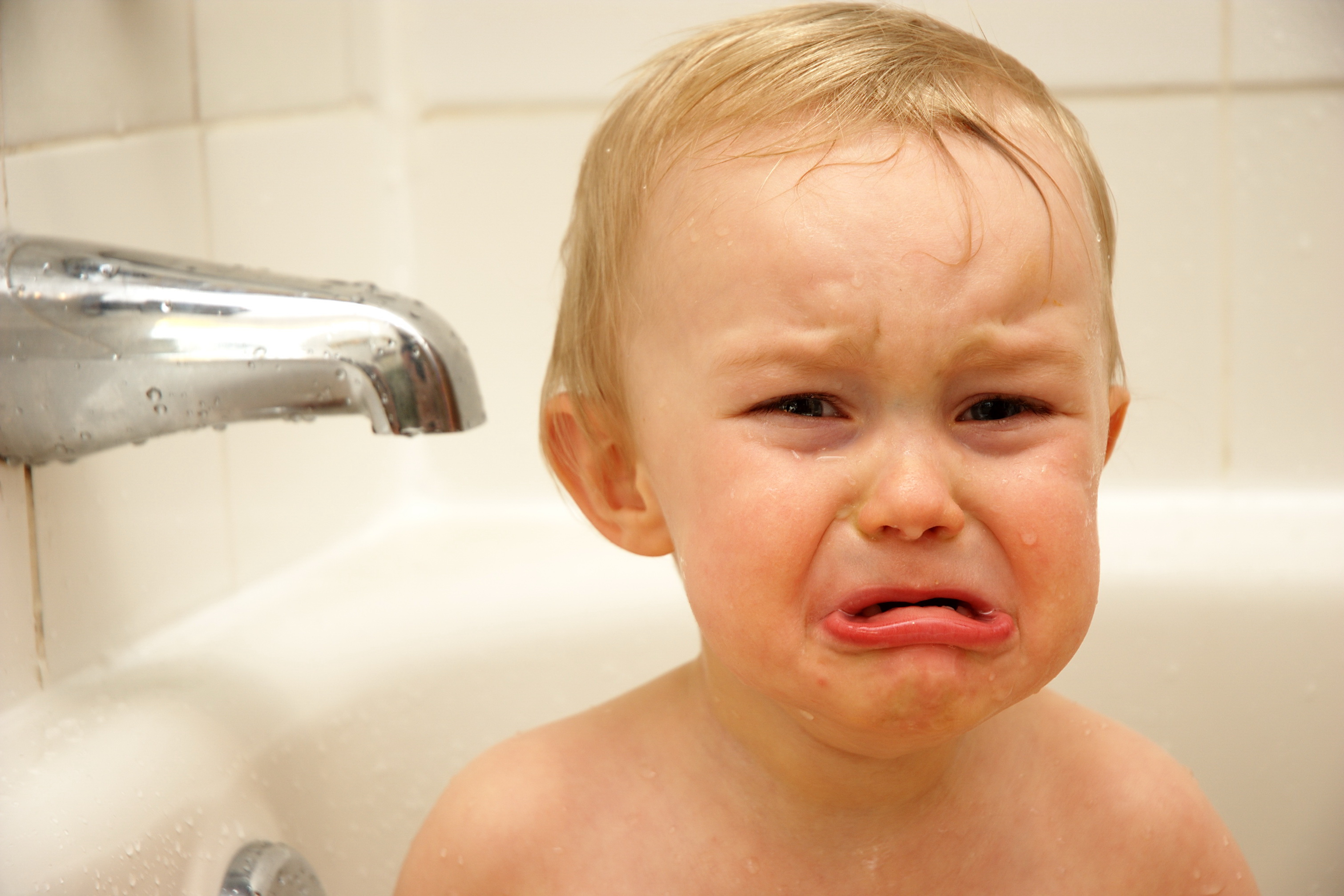
Should parents give comfort or teach composure?

Stress has been surveyed and documented in many studies. The theoretical foundation was created in the 1960s by Richard Lazarus. In 1974, Hans Selye introduced the differentiation between distress and eustress, and in 1984, psychoanalyst Heinz Kohut proposed the concept of optimal frustration; Kohut postulated that the harmony between parents and child needs some well allotted disruption in order to empower the child to develop a healthy personality. In resilience psychology, too, there is broad agreement today that it harms children if their parents keep any stress away from them indiscriminately; by doing so, they suggest to the child that everyday problems are painful and overall to be avoided.

Even though stress is one of the fundamental terms of attachment parenting, William Sears' publications do not reveal acquaintance with pertinent literature about this topic. Sears links stress and distress with the release of cortisol, but uses both terms synonymously and in a purely colloquial sense. He refers the term to any uncomfortable or frustrating state which makes the child cry – a signal which AP mothers are supposed to carefully attend to since stress sickens the child. On the other hand, Sears advises mothers not to overreact and to teach the child imperturbation ("Caribbean approach"). He leaves it up to the parents to decide which type of response individual situations ask for.

For parenting, any fuzziness of the term stress as well as of the term need have far-reaching consequences. If it is assumed that any crying of the child indicates harmful stress and that any of his demands indicate a true need, parents are bound to confuse rapport, sensitivity, responsivity, emotional availability, and wise protection with behaviors that, from an educational standpoint, are highly dysfunctional and that William Sears mostly would not agree with himself:

- with anxious continuous monitoring of the child
- with over-parenting, that is the continuous removal of such problems which the child could actually cope with herself
- with continuous micromanagement of the child's moods, aimed to keep the child happy around the clock; indeed, William Sears considers happiness "the end result and the bottom line of child-rearing".

==== Instinct and nature ====
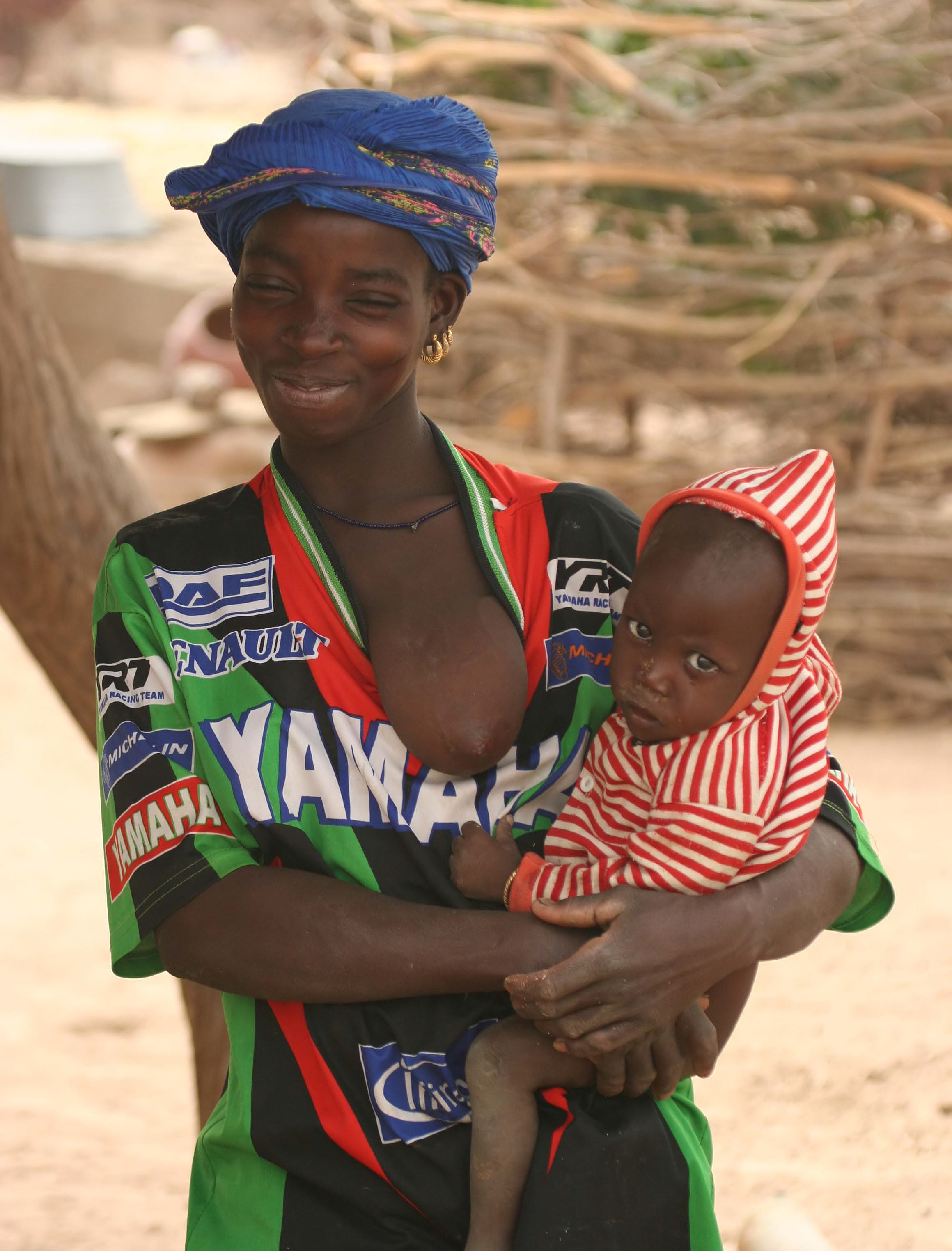
Mother with child in Mali (2006)

Instinct is another basic term of attachment parenting. The Searses describe attachment parenting as the natural, biological, intuitive and spontaneous behavior of mothers who rely on their instincts, sixth sense, inner wisdom or common sense. They attribute even motherliness itself to instincts, whereas they attest men a reduced instinct for children's needs.

Instinct theory developed in the 1930s within the framework of ethology. It owes its basic ideas to William McDougall among others, and its elaboration mainly to Konrad Lorenz and Nikolaas Tinbergen. Lorenz believed that instincts are physiological processes and assumed they could be described as neuronal circuitry in the brain. But already Arnold Gehlen had disputed that humans still have much instinct at their disposal; for him, plasticity and learning aptitude outranked instinct. In today's research, the term instinct is regarded as obsolete. Recent studies have demonstrated that motherly behavior is not inbred but biologically and socially determined. It is partly triggered by oxytocin, partly learned.

William Sears' writings show no knowledge of this current state of research. The Searses use the word instinct in a purely colloquial sense and synonymous with terms like hormonal and natural; as an antipole of instinct and nature, they identify the things that "childcare advisors" say.

If you were on an island, and you had no mothers-in-law, no psychologists, no doctors around, no experts, this is what you would naturally and instinctively do to give your baby the best investment you'll ever give.

— William Sears, Martha Sears

William Sears, who owes his formative impressions to Jean Liefloff, points to mammals, primates, "other", "primitive", and "traditional" cultures, namely on Bali and in Zambia. Some other researchers and humanists have agreed that this strongly implies western parenting styles are unnatural including James W. Prescott. Developmental psychologist Heidi Keller who comparatively researched the mother-child relationship in a large bandwidth of cultures, disputes that attachment parenting can be described as a return to a "natural motherliness", like many supporters advertise it. Keller doesn't rank attachment parenting as a counteragent to the high-tech world but asserts that it "paradoxically fits optimally into a society of individualists and lone warriors how we experience it in the Western world". Many of the methods that the representatives of attachment parenting attribute to the evolutionary history of life do not actually play the major role in non-western cultures that is attributed to them. In Cameroon for example, children are actually carried in a sling initially, but then have to learn to sit and to walk much earlier than European and North American children; rather than to cultivate affectionate eye contact, mothers blow into their children's face in order to get them out of the habit of making eye contact.

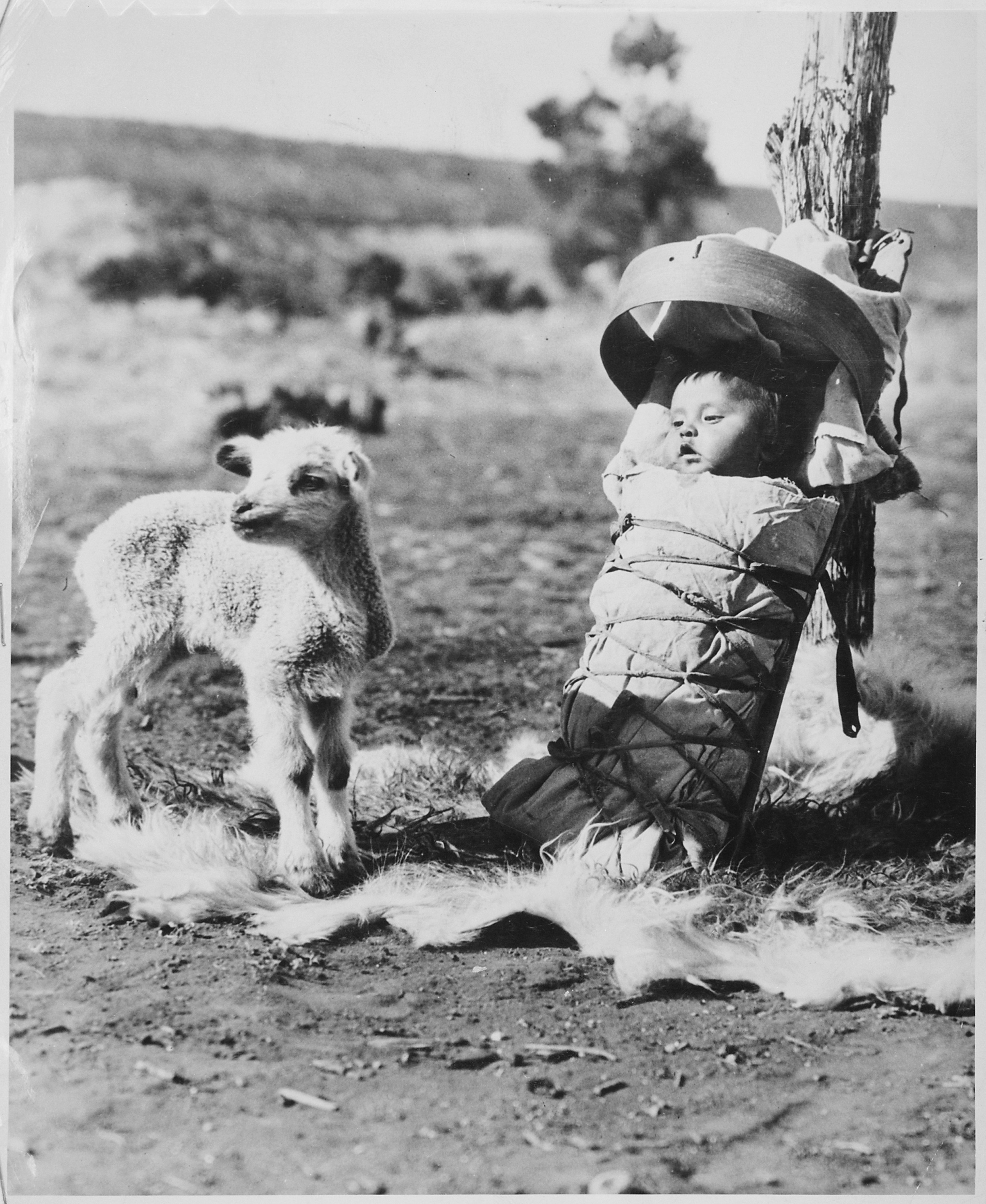
Navajo baby on a cradleboard (1936)

Even in the United States, there are minority groups which can be classified as highly "traditional", none of them practicing attachment parenting. Amish mothers for example co-sleep with their infants, but only for the first several months; they never let their infants and toddlers out of view, but they do not wear them while they are working. From very early on, Amish children are raised to serve God, family, and community rather than to express their own needs. The infants of orthodox Jews traditionally sleep in cradles. In communities where there is no eruv, Jewish parents are not allowed to carry their children about on Shabbat. Native Americans traditionally used cradleboards which could be worn, but which involved minimal physical touch of mother and child.

=== Optimal development of the child ===
As Suzanne M. Cox (Northwestern University) has pointed out, neither attachment theory nor attachment parenting offer a general outline of the optimal development of the child, which could be used to empirically measure the efficacy of attachment parenting. The Searses promise parenting results such as increased independence, confidence, health, physical growth, improved development of the motor and language skills, good manners, conscientiousness, social competence, sense of justice, altruism, sensitivity, empathy, concentration, self-control, and intelligence. However, there is no conclusive evidence from empirical research that supports such claims.

The ultimate target of child rearing is, according to Sears, happiness. Similar to the German catholic Albert Wunsch, Sears therefore ranks among those parenting advisors whose philosophies reflect stray aspects of their religious beliefs, but result in a purely worldly target. In the year of the publication of the Attachment Parenting Book, Wendy Mogel, by contrast, suggested her own very influential concept of character education that was straightforwardly based on her Jewish faith (The Blessings of a Skinned Knee, 2001).

== Distribution and acceptance ==
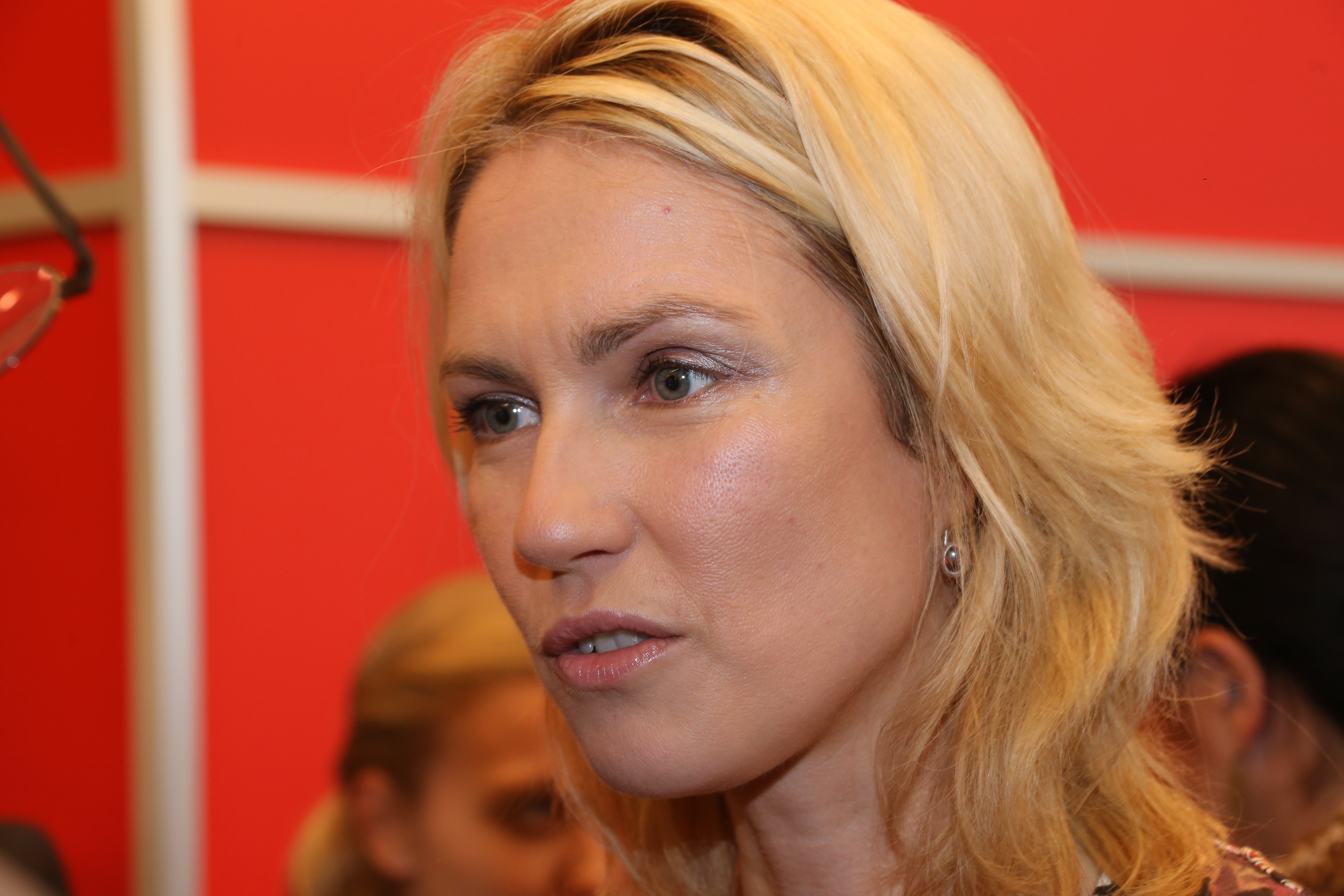
In 2014, German Federal Minister of Family Affairs, Manuela Schwesig, was patron of the first Attachment Parenting Congress in Germany.

Attachment parenting is particularly popular among educated urban women in Western countries, who are interested in ecological and social issues.

In the United States, parenting tips of well-known people like the actresses Mayim Bialik and Alicia Silverstone contributed to the popularity of the philosophy. Many North American Women are organized in support groups of Attachment Parenting International (API), the movement's umbrella organization, in which Martha Sears serves as a board member. In Canada, there are further AP organizations such as the Attachment Parenting Canada Association (Calgary); even some public health organizations promote attachment parenting. William Sears has close ties to the international La Leche League (LLL) which feature him as a conference speaker and published several of his books. In LLL groups, many mothers get in touch with attachment parenting for the first time. There are also attachment parenting organizations in Australia and in New Zealand.

In Europe, Attachment Parenting Europe (APEU, in Lelystad, Netherlands) campaigns for attachment parenting; in the Dutch language the philosophy is referred to as natuurlijk ouderschap ("natural parenthood"). This organization keeps liaisons to representatives in Belgium, Denmark, Germany, Ireland, Italy, Norway, the United Kingdom, and Switzerland. In 2012, there were 30 AP groups in England and Wales.

In Germany, there are independent AP institutions in several cities. Hamburg, the movement's central point in Germany, hosted a first Attachment Parenting Congress in 2014, under the patronage of Federal Minister of Family Affairs, Manuela Schwesig. A second one has been announced for 2016.

In Austria and Switzerland there exist a small number of AP institutions, too. In Sweden, fantasy and science fiction writer Jorun Modén solicits attachment parenting, which she refers to as nära föräldraskap ("proximal parenthood"). In France where the philosophy is dubbed as maternage intensif or maternage proximal, the movement has virtually no followers; due to the success of the Napoleonic education reforms, the French traditionally have a deeply rooted belief that educated child care specialists educate children at least as well as mothers do.

=== "Parental tribalism" ===
Katha Pollitt referred to attachment parenting as a fad. Parents who follow the philosophy have been reproached as acting according to their own helplessness and unsatisfied emotional neediness which may be the true reasons for their decision to incessantly pacify their child by breastfeeding and babywearing even into toddlerhood, as the belief that the child actually needs all that permanent intimacy for their healthy development is only a subterfuge. Emma Jenner argued that parents who are in the habit of stereotypically attending to each of the child's signals with physical proximity will not learn to perceive the child's needs in the full extent of their bandwidth and complexity.

Katie Allison Granju, who advocates attachment parenting and who published comprehensive guidelines for AP parents, offers a different perspective. She characterizes attachment parenting as not just a parenting style, but "a completely fulfilling way of life".

Sociologist Jan Macvarish (University of Kent), a pioneer in the recent field of parenting culture study, described how AP parents utilize their parenting philosophy as a strategy of individualization, as a way to find personal identity and to join a group of congenial adults. Macvarish even speaks of "parental tribalism". According to Macvarish, it is characteristic for such choices that they are much more angled towards the parents' self-perception than towards the child's needs. Sociologist Charlotte Faircloth, too, considers attachment parenting a strategy that women pursue in order to gain and to express personal identity.

=== Child-rearing and lifestyle preferences of AP parents ===
Multiple authors have stated that many parents choose attachment parenting as part of an individualization strategy and as a statement of personal identity and of social affiliation. This assumption is supported by the observation that most AP parents show further distinctive parenting and life style preferences that are based on a particular set of attitudes (notably: a striving for naturalness), which, however, are mostly not directly tied to the declared goal of attachment parenting:

- "gentle" childbirth, "natural" childbirth, home birth;
- use of homemade toddler food from organic ingredients, veganism, paleolithic diet;
- use of washable cloth diapers, elimination communication;
- "gentle discipline", "positive discipline", non-confrontative parenting;
- naturopathy, holistic health, homeopathy, and decline of vaccination. William Sears' son Robert Sears published a Vaccine Book in 2007 which fueled the vaccine skepticism among parents, and in some AP groups, parents are explicitly asked not to have their children vaccinated. Vaccine skepticism is not universal among AP groups, however.

Some practices and preferences of AP parents are prevalent only in North America:

- decline of infant circumcision (in Europe, infant circumcision is relatively rare).
- naturism
- homeschooling or unschooling (in Europe, the legality of homeschooling depends on the specific country).

The Sears encourage some of these practices explicitly, for example non-smoking, healthy and home-prepared food, no circumcision, but do not comment on how they are supposed to be linked to the core ideas of attachment parenting. Only in the case of positive discipline, the link is quite obvious.

=== Feminist perspective ===
In his Complete Book of Christian Parenting and Child Care (1997), William Sears opposes maternal occupation, because he is convinced that it harms the child:

[Some] mothers choose to go back to their jobs quickly simply because they don't understand how disruptive that is to the well-being of their babies. So many babies in our culture are not being cared for in the way God designed, and we as a nation are paying the price.

— William Sears, The Complete Book of Christian Parenting and Child Care (1997)

Baby books (including my own) and child care experts extol the virtues of motherhood as the supreme career.

— William Sears

Any form of intensive, obsessive mothering has, as Katha Pollitt stated, devastating consequences for the equality of treatment of women in the society. In France, Élisabeth Badinter argued that over-parenting, obsession with washable diapers and organic, home made infant food, and parenting practices as the ones recommended by Sears, with breastfeeding into toddlerhood, bring women inevitably back into outdated patterns of gender role. In the United States, Badinter's book The Conflict: How Modern Motherhood Undermines the Status of Women (2010) had a partially critical reception, because there is no publicly paid childcare leave in this country, and many women consider it a luxury to be able to be a stay-at-home-mom during the child's first years. Still, gynecologist Amy Tuteur (formerly Harvard Medical School) stated that attachment parenting amounts to a new subjection of the woman's body under social control – a trend that is more than questionable in the face to the hard-fought achievements of women's movement.

As Erica Jong observed, the rise of attachment parenting followed a surge of glamourized motherhood of popular stars (Angelina Jolie, Madonna, Gisele Bündchen) in the mass media. She stated that the effort to model exceptional children under sacrifice of the parent's own well-being transformed motherhood into a "highly competitive race"; all attempts of women to radically monopolize their parental responsibilities very much accommodate right-wing politics.

=== A "culture of total motherhood" ===
In her 2005 book Perfect Madness. Motherhood in the Age of Anxiety, Judith Warner, too, described how attachment parenting has taken a strong influence on mainstream parenting and how it has established a "culture of total motherhood"; due to these cultural changes, mothers are convinced today that they have to instantly attend to every need of their children in order to protect them from the risk of lifelong abandonment issues. As early as in 1996, sociologist Sharon Hays wrote about a newly formed "ideology of intensive mothering". Characteristic of this ideology is the tendency to impose parenting responsibility primarily on mothers and to favor a kind of parenting that is child-centered, expert-guided, emotionally absorbing, labor, and financially intensive. Hays saw the motives for the overloading of motherhood in the idealistic endeavor to cure an overly egoistical and competitive society through a counterbalancing principle of altruistic motherliness. But according to Hays, any kind of "intensive motherhood" that systematically privileges children's needs over mothers' needs happens without fail to the economical and personal disadvantage of mothers.

In 2014, a team of researchers at the University of Mary Washington showed in a study that mothers endorsing the belief that parenting is challenging (e.g. "It is harder to be a good mother than to be a corporate executive"), which is associated with intensive motherhood, have statistically more signs of depression

=== Fathers in attachment parenting ===
Sears has taken an adamant stance against fathers being primary caregivers in attachment parenting. On his website, he claims that fathers should "help" by supporting mothers and creating an environment which allows the mother to devote herself to the baby. Sears has claimed infants have a natural preference for a mother in the early years; although, little scientific literature actually supports this conjecture since these studies are typically done in situations where the mother is the primary caregiver and not the father. It is biased to say that infants have a "natural" preference for the mother when their mother is the one who is their primary caregiver; a more correct statement would be that infants have an attachment preference for the parent who is their primary caregiver. Studies have found that between 5 and 20% of children actually have a primary attachment with their father.

One specific caregiving activity in which Sears claims fathers should be supportive rather than primary is feeding. Breastfeeding includes nutritional benefits which are undeniable, but the main reason breastfeeding is promoted in attachment parenting is for the mother-child bonding through skin to skin contact and intimacy; however, the benefits of skin to skin contact and intimacy are still present for fathers. Dr. Sigmund Freud theorized that infants tend to prefer mothers since it is the mother who fulfills the infant's oral needs; however, if the father is fulfilling this need, it would be reasonable to assume that attachment would form with the father. Through what is called "bottle nursing", fathers and other caregivers who cannot breastfeed hold the infant touching their bare torso and feed gently and intimately, focusing their attention on the baby.

Other common mother-child AP practices, such as bonding after birth and co-sleeping, may also be equally beneficial for fathers.
