= Sarah Ockwell-Smith =

British author

Sarah Ockwell-Smith (born c. 1976) is a British author of parenting and childcare books and a proponent of attachment parenting.

== Published works ==
Ockwell-Smith's first book BabyCalm, published in 2012, focuses on parenting from birth to six months. Her second book ToddlerCalm, published in 2013, focusses on parenting from one to three years of age. In 2015 Ockwell-Smith branched away from the 'Calm' line of books to release The Gentle Sleep Book. The Gentle Sleep Book offers sleep advice from birth to five years and does not involve any controlled crying techniques. The Gentle Sleep Book has sold over 100,000 copies in the UK. The Gentle Parenting Book, which provides an introduction to gentle parenting from birth to seven years, was published in Spring 2016, closely followed by Why Your Baby's Sleep Matters.

Ockwell-Smith was contracted to write a further three books in the 'Gentle' series: The Gentle Discipline Book and The Gentle Potty Training Book, both to be published in 2017, and The Gentle Eating Book, published in 2018. Her latest books include The Second Baby Book, published in 2019, and The Starting School Book, published in 2020.

Ockwell-Smith's books have been translated into 30 different languages, including Spanish, Italian, Chinese, Estonian, Romanian, Russian and Turkish. She is represented by Eve White Literary Agency and published by Piatkus, an imprint of the Little, Brown book group and Pinter and Martin, an independent publisher based in London.

== Media appearances ==
Ockwell-Smith has appeared on Channel 5 News and Good Morning Britain discussing changes to NICE guidance. She was also interviewed for Sky News about the birth of Prince George. Ockwell-Smith has previously appeared on BBC Radio 4's Woman's Hour in Spring 2016.

== Personal life ==
Ockwell-Smith is married with four children. She was born in Bedfordshire and raised in Bishops Stortford, Hertfordshire where she attended the Hertfordshire and Essex High School. She currently lives in Saffron Walden, Essex. Ockwell-Smith holds an honours degree in Psychology awarded from the University of Greenwich and also holds qualifications in antenatal education. Before working as an author Ockwell-Smith worked as a homeopath, doula and hypnobirthing teacher.
