= A Hidden Star =

2022 documentary film

- Directed by: Mary Elizabeth Gentle, Alia Tarraf
- Screenplay by: Staci Emerson
- Produced by: Alan Caudillo; Staci Emerson; Mary Elizabeth Gentle; Jacqueline Reyno; Gary A. Rizzo; Alia Tarraf
- Production company: Hidden Star Films
- Release date: October 2021 (Twin Cities Film Festival)
- Running time: 90 minutes
- Country: United States
- Language: English

A Hidden Star is a 2021 American documentary film of video diaries of a woman dying of cancer and of her friends documenting the process of their grief. The film was directed by Alia Tarraf and Mary Beth Gentle, who were both friends of Allison Wilke Gryphon, the woman who documented her journey through cancer. The film aims to answer the question, "how do you celebrate life after you’ve experienced untenable grief?"

== Plot ==
Filmmaker Allison is diagnosed with breast cancer and dies in 2016. Devastated, friends of Allison, Alia Tarraf and Mary Beth Gentle, find video diaries of herself documenting her journey with cancer. From watching Allison's video diaries and knowing her, twenty-three of her friends document their journey to Ireland to scatter Allison's ashes at the Cliffs of Moher.

They all return home and, still struck with grief, they all also meet with Dr. Staci Emerson, a death midwife and psychologist who helps Allison's friends through the process of grief.

== Production ==
Mary Elizabeth Gentle and Alia Tarraf became friends while working on the Disney Live Action team through Allison, a filmmaker and Mary Beth’s best friend. All three friends dreamed to make a production company today one day.

Secretly, Allison had filmed vlogs of herself going through her journey with cancer. Upon her death, her friends found these never-before-seen videos and decided to create a documentary about their friend with the help of Dr. Staci Emerson. But this project turned into a way for Allison's friends to process their own grief from losing their friend. Their production company was created as a result of making this film.

Tarraf and Gentle produced the film while working for Disney.

== Release ==
In 2021, the film released in the Twin Cities Film Festival.

== Reception ==
Mpls St Paul Magazine comments the film "gets real, but the ending uplifts audience members".
