= Home funeral =

Funeral at a person's home

A home funeral is when a funeral occurs at a person's home, as opposed to a funeral home or place of worship. Though rare since the advent of funeral homes, they were once common events, since washing and laying out the body often took place at home, as well as the viewing, the wake and the burial in the family plot. Some are now preferring to do this themselves.

== History ==
Until the American Civil War, most funerals in America were home funerals.

== Legality ==
Most American states allow home funerals, requiring only a death certificate, and legal permission to transport the body. In Canada, the same is required.

From the point of view of the funeral director, in home services present additional challenges; access being prime. Care and sensitivity must be taken particularly in a multi-unit situation such as an apartment, condominium or row housing complex. Families are advised to notify neighbours in advance of services in order to avoid unfortunate misunderstandings. Once delivered into the care of the private home, the funeral director is under no legal obligation to remain with the deceased.

== Home funerals in Australia ==
In Australia, a home funeral, also known as a family-led funeral, is a legal and increasingly chosen option where family and community members take primary responsibility for caring for a deceased person and arranging their funeral rites, often without the involvement of a commercial funeral director. This approach allows families to be involved in practical tasks such as washing, dressing, cooling, and encoffining the body, as well as holding the funeral ceremony in a private home or another familiar setting. The duration a person may be kept at home varies by state and territory.

The practice is grounded in a desire for greater agency, personalisation, and autonomy in death care, which proponents argue can lead to improved grief and bereavement outcomes. It also offers a practical alternative for those seeking to reduce funeral costs. While a funeral director is not legally required in all cases, families must still complete mandatory paperwork, including registering the death and obtaining burial or cremation permits, and arrange for transport and final disposition. The Australian Home Funeral Alliance serves as a national peak body that provides information, education, and advocacy to support families and practitioners in navigating these processes and fostering a more empowered approach to death and dying.

== See also ==
- Natural burial
- Death midwife
