= DONA International =

International doula training and certification organization

DONA International (formerly Doulas of North America) was founded in 1992 and is the first and largest doula training and certification organization. The current president of the non-profit is Erica Lane (2026), Angela Daniel is the president elect (2027), and Telia Anderson (2025) is the immediate past president.

== History ==
In the 1980s, Marshall H. Klaus, John H. Kennell, Phyllis Klaus, Penny Simkin (1938–2024), and Annie Kennedy first formed a partnership of doulas and medical professionals. Klaus (1927–2017), a neonatologist, and Kennell (1922–2013), a pediatrician, gave credibility to doulas Phyllis Klaus, Simkin, and Kennedy by supporting their work through the research of parent-child bonding in the 1960s at Case Western Reserve University.

Doulas Of North America (DONA) was formally founded in 1992 and the organization was the first of its kind to both train and certify the non-medical birth support of doulas and marked the start of professional doulas on a nationwide basis. Kennedy (who had originally founded the Pacific Association of Labor Support in 1989 in Seattle, WA with Simkin alongside the doula training at Seattle Midwifery School) become the first president of the organization.

In 2004, the organization re-branded as DONA International.

By 2026, there were over 14,000 doulas certified through the organization.

== Training and certification ==
DONA International offers birth and postpartum doula training and certification. To certify as a doula, an in-person, virtual, or hybrid workshop is mandatory, along with supplementary text reading, lactation training and childbirth education, and clients experience. The workshop is taught by approved trainers who are able to the required coursework which includes emotional support, physical support or comfort measures, communication, interventions, ethics and professional behavior.

== See also ==
- Midwife
- Doulma (disambiguation)
