= Death doula =

Person who assists in the dying process

A death doula, or death midwife, is a person who assists in the dying process, much like a midwife or doula does with the birthing process. It is often a community based role, aiming to help families cope with death, recognizing it as a natural and important part of life. The role can supplement and go beyond hospice. These specialists perform a large variety of services, including but not limited to creating death plans, and providing spiritual, psychological, and social support before and just after death. Their role can also include more logistical activities, helping with services, planning funerals and memorial services, and guiding mourners in their rights and responsibilities.

The presence of the role of a modern death doula has been evolving in recent years, including a controversy over the regulation process for the position and the use of the term "midwife" as opposed to doula, and bills proposed to regulate the process and provide licenses for death doulas. The terms "end-of-life doula", "end of life guide", "home funeral guide" and "celebrant" are also used. The field has also seen a significant rise in training organizations, which train hospitals along with individuals.

== Historical role of death doulas ==
The rise of death doulas is a relatively new movement, with private certification programs following the legacy of pilot programs in clinical care. One of the first movements was started in New York in 2000, a volunteer program focused on pairing so-called "doulas" with terminally ill people. The program was funded by the Shira Ruskay Center of the Jewish Board of Family and Children's Services and NYU Medical Center, and began pairing five volunteers with patients. The program was ultimately named "Doula to Accompany and Comfort". The volunteers went through training on both clinical and spiritual aspects, including, but not limited to, the complexities of end of life health care, physical issues like incontinence and disorientation, and hope in the face of death.

The next major clinical implementation of the death doula methodology was at the Baylor Supportive and Palliative Care Service and Clinical Ethics Committee shortly after the establishment of the New York program. Members of this department including palliative care nurses, chaplains, and therapists worked together to create a program in consultation with the New York program. From there, a program involving a 6-week training program was formed to work hand in hand with clinical medicine, wherein doulas are referred by nurses, social workers, and therapists, and must be specifically ordered by the doctor. After being ordered, volunteer-trained doulas are matched by the hospital's reverend to individual cases. While the Doula to Accompany and Comfort program provided outpatient services as well as inpatient, the Baylor program is only for inpatients.

== Legal controversy ==
=== Use of the word midwife ===
There has been controversy over the label of "Death Midwife" in Canada. The College of Midwives of British Columbia has called for death doulas to stop using the label of midwife, specifically with the Canadian Integrative Network for Death Education and Alternatives (CINDEA). The basis of the case is that Louise Aerts, the executive director of the College of Midwives, claims that the term "midwife" is specifically reserved for the traditional sense of the word about birth. The Health Professions Act protects its usage. In response, the CINDEA website has recently added the following disclaimer to their website: "The role and practices of death midwives are frequently referred to on this website. Death midwives are not conventional midwives (who deal with birthing) or health professionals, nor are they registered with any of the Colleges of Midwives in Canada."

== Responsibilities ==
The role of a death doula is to educate and empower families to exercise their innate right to care for their own dead. Death doulas "provide emotional, spiritual, and physical support at an intensely personal and crucial time. They assist people in finding meaning, creating a legacy project, and planning for how the last days will unfold. Doulas also guide and support loved ones through the last days of life and ease the suffering of grief in its early stages".

Death is a situation that no one can completely prepare for. Additionally, many people do not have much experience with people close to them dying. Because of this, when it comes to the time to deal with dying there are a lot of questions and uncertainty. Pain management is only one part of end-of-life care; another part, of equal or greater importance at the end of their life, is the psychological aspects, including the management of close relationships. A doula's support can relieve stress and burdensome tasks from the family in order to provide care for the dying individual but also gives the individual psychological and emotional support in the process.

Although the specific responsibilities of a death doula vary from certification program to program, there are certain parallels through each. The services provided by a death doula can generally be broken down into two categories.

=== Information ===
- providing the family with information about a broad spectrum of end-of-life choices, including home funerals and natural burials
- providing the family with information about advance directives and other forms, especially those needed for home funerals
- providing families from culturally diverse communities with the same information as above, which helps avoid a gap in care

=== Support ===
- building a relationship with the terminally ill person, and advocating for their needs and wishes
- providing spiritual and emotional support for the terminally ill person and their family
- helping the family in administering the terminally ill person's final wishes

== Motivations ==
Many people who become death doulas are "volunteers who feel strongly about creating a safe space." They are caring individuals who want to support patients in their end of life stages. Another reason people are attracted to this field is that "they want the contact, the involvement and they are drawn to the mission - making sure someone is not facing this [death process] alone". People who become death doulas are there because they want to help the family and the patient through the whole process, as a neutral third party. Most death doula roles are principally volunteer; further details of how their roles are funded are not well established in scholarly literature.

== Education and certification ==
There are many private organisations that offer education or certification programs. Certification is not available in traditional educational environments; it usually is offered in shorter, paid training sessions. However, since there is no centralised organisation for death doulas the training involved often varies by location causing inconsistencies within the role. The Doula Program in New York is a volunteer organisation that focuses on the relationship between the doula and the dying. Instead of certification, volunteers submit an application in a pool of around 300, and around 12 are admitted each cycle.

Public certification programs associated with hospitals and more closely tied with clinical care are restricted to a few pilot programs. These often involve training spanning multiple weeks similarly to the private programs, however, they are often more related to palliative care and putting the terminally ill patient in a more comfortable situation through clinical means and mental health counseling rather than focusing so much on the spiritual and emotional support aspect. These programs include Baylor University Medical Center's Support and Palliative Care Service's Doula to Accompany and Comfort Program, as well as New York University Medical Center's Department of Social Services nonsectarian volunteer doula program.

Although still in the early stages, a number of public, accredited, Canadian post-secondary institutions are now offering training to death doulas. For example, Douglas College, a public community college, offers a course entitled Introduction to End-of-Life Doula (BREV 1100). Also, in December 2023, Vancouver Island University, a public university, graduated its first cohort of students from a course entitled Introduction to End of Life Doula (HHED 100).

== "Doula" etymology ==
The term doula came from Ancient Greek, where the term meant "slave woman," or "maid"; already present in Mycenaean Greek, the term was probably borrowed from Carian, Lydian, or more likely Pre-Greek. The term doula was more commonly used again in roughly the 1960s where it often defined an individual who assisted in the birthing process. This individual was often a woman, one that not only helped during the birthing process but also provided support for women before and after the birth as well. Recently the term death doula has been coined to refer to a trained person who provides a dying individual and their family with assistance and resources.

The terms both feminine and masculine doula and doulos are still currently in use in the Greek language today. The word "doula" was appropriated for use by Dana Raphael in the 1970s.

== Associated fields ==
=== Hospice care ===
The role of a death doula is consistent with the more holistic approach taken in hospice care. As a result, some hospitals and hospice centers that deal with end of life patients have had their own staff's counselors go through death doula training. This can be carried out through the organisation International End of Life Doula Association (INELDA), which provides training sessions across four countries. The Death Doula Training program trains hospice groups, palliative care nurses and physicians, mental health professionals, clergy, and individuals.

=== Alternative death care movement ===
The death doula phenomenon is associated with the death-positive movement. It has also been linked to increasing interest in alternative methods of dealing with remains, including green burials, conservation burials, and home burials. Death doulas are trained to have the knowledge to provide the family with after-life alternative death care options. A goal of many death midwives is to provide information about alternatives to cremation or conventional burial, such as natural or green burial, and "flameless cremation" or alkaline hydrolysis, which is legal in 14 states. Other environmentally sustainable methods of final disposition are being developed, including human composting, also known as "soil transformation", "recomposition" or "Terramation".
