= Penny Simkin =

American physical therapist and childbirth educator

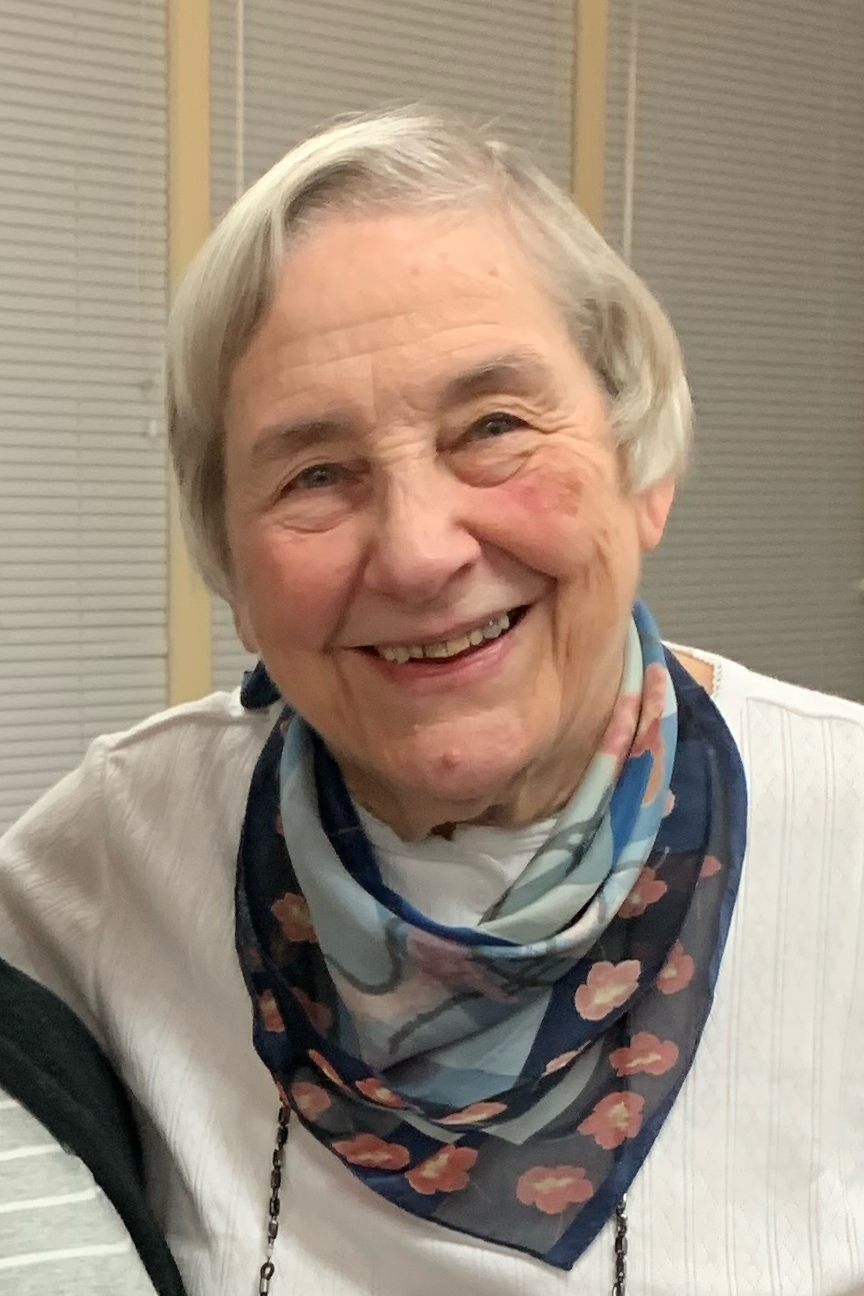
- Simkin in 2019
- Born: May 31, 1938
- Died: April 11, 2024 (aged 85)

Penny Simkin (May 31, 1938 – April 11, 2024) was an American physical therapist and childbirth educator. She was one of the founders of DONA International.
