= Dana Raphael =

American medical anthropologist

Dana Louise Raphael (January 5, 1926 – February 2, 2016) was an American medical anthropologist. She was a strong advocate of breastfeeding and promoted the movement to recruit non-medical care-givers to assist mothers during and after childbirth. She called such care-givers "doulas." The term "doula" (from Ancient Greek δούλη, a female slave) was popularized in her 1973 book The Tender Gift: Breastfeeding. She also coined the term “matrescence,” the rite of passage where “changes occur in a woman's physical state, in her status within the group, in her emotional life, in her focus of daily activity, in her own identity, and in her relationships with all those around her” through new motherhood.

== Early life and education ==
Dana Louise Raphael was born in New Britain, Connecticut, on January 5, 1926, the daughter of Louis Raphael, who owned a department store chain, and the former Naomi Kaplan. Raphael received her bachelor's degree and Ph.D. in anthropology from Columbia University in New York City, which was supervised by Margaret Mead. Her research was not always respected: some Columbia faculty called her “the Tit Lady.”

== Career ==
=== Work on breastfeeding ===
Having avoided a conventional wedding and refused to take her husband's name (unusual in the 1950s), she rejected the common practice of bottle-feeding, but had difficulty breastfeeding her first-born son. ”I lacked the knowledge and the assistance needed to let down my milk,” she later said. “The more my hungry son screamed, the guiltier I felt.”

She observed that new mothers had less social support than earlier in human history and that the sexualization of breasts in the postwar United States had led to cultural attitudes against breastfeeding. Her research methods included surveying people she met throughout New York City and studying new motherhood in other countries.

In 1975, Raphael and Mead founded The Human Lactation Center, an institute devoted to researching patterns of lactation worldwide. Their research found that impoverished women were often too undernourished and stressed to breastfeed, and in these cases, formula was important and even essential.

=== Recognizing doulas ===
Related to her work on breastfeeding was the concept of the doula. She learned the word "doula" from a woman in Greece who told her that it fitted the role that Raphael was describing to her of a woman who helps a nursing mother by taking on other work in the home; Raphael then used the term in her 1966 dissertation on cross-cultural practices of breast-feeding before making the term more public in a magazine article in 1969. She gave it more widespread currency in "The Tender Gift: Breastfeeding" in 1976.

=== Theory of matrescence ===
As an overarching framework for this study of maternity and early infant care, Raphael's theory of matrescence named motherhood as a significant social, cultural, political, and biological rite of passage. Matrescence goes beyond gestation and maternity, she wrote,” in part because attitudes about when and how women become mothers and care for infants differ across cultures. “Giving birth,” she wrote, “does not automatically make a mother out of a woman.”

== Personal life ==
Dana Raphael was married to Howard Boone Jacobson, with whom she had three children: Seth, Jessa, and Brett. She breastfed her second child for five years. Her third child was adopted, and Raphael induced lactation so that she could breastfeed.

Raphael died of complications arising from congestive heart failure on 2 February 2016 at her home in Fairfield, Connecticut.

== Selected publications ==
=== Books ===
- Raphael, Dana (1975). Being female : reproduction, power, and change. The Hague: Mouton. ISBN 978-0202011516.
- Raphael, Dana (1976). The Tender Gift: Breastfeeding. New York: Schocken Books. ISBN 978-0805205190.
- Raphael, Dana, ed. (1979). Breastfeeding and food policy in a hungry world. New York: Academic Press. ISBN 978-0125809504.
- Raphael, Dana; Davies, Flora (1985). Only mothers know : patterns of infant feeding in traditional cultures. Westport, Connecticut: Greenwood Press. ISBN 978-0313245411.

=== Articles ===
Raphael, Dana. “The Midwife As Doula: A Guide to Mothering the Mother,” Journal of Nurse-Midwifery, 26(6), Nov-Dec 1981, pp. 13–15.

== See also ==
- Nestlé boycott
