= Infant sleep training =

Parental intervention technique

Sleep training (sometimes known as sleep coaching) is a set of parental (or caregiver) intervention techniques with the end goal of increasing nightly sleep in infants and young children, addressing “sleep concerns”, and decreasing nighttime signalling. Although the diagnostic criteria for sleep issues in infants is rare and limited, sleep training is usually approached by parents or caregivers self identifying supposed sleep issues.

The idea of early independence and sleep training in babies was promoted by Dr. Luther Emmett Holt, who published The Care and Feeding of Children in 1894. This is widely believed to be the basis from which modern sleep training has evolved. Popular methods of sleep training include extinction or “cry it out”, the Ferber method, The Chair Approach, and more improvised “gentle” methods.

Sleep training tends to be popular in countries such as the USA and UK, and is mostly unheard of in societies that practice cultural cosleeping.

== Development of sleep over the first year ==
During the first year of life, infants spend most of their time sleeping. An infant can go through several periods of change in sleep patterns. These can start at 1 week, occurring weekly or fortnightly, until 8 years of age due to innate and external factors that contribute to sleep.

Developing infants also sleep within a large spectrum of sleep — falling into high and low needs categories — fragmented through 24 hours.

These frequent night awakenings are an evolved trait, to feed frequently and playing a part in SIDS protection. However, this can be disruptive for the parent(s) or caregiver — for example, if maternity leave is non-existent or they feel the benefits of an undisturbed night can help with severe sleep deprivation. Parents who sleep trained perceive improvement in infant sleep.

== Sleep conditions ==
Sylvia Bell of Johns Hopkins University reported that by the end of the first year, individual differences in crying reflect the history of maternal responsiveness rather than constitutional differences in infant irritability. She also noted that consistency and promptness of maternal response is associated with decline in frequency and duration of infant crying. When following through with this maternal response, Bell noted that it is most effective to apply physical contact with the infant.

The sleep position is also important to prevent Sudden Infant Death Syndrome (SIDS). It is recommended that the proper position for children to sleep in to avoid SIDS is laying on their back throughout the night. Their bedding should be firm and crib should be free from toys or blankets that could cause injury or suffocation to the child. Loose blankets and toys in the crib can increase the child’s risk of SIDS.

== Studies ==
Several high-quality studies have investigated the effects of sleep training methods, including "graduated extinction" and "bedtime fading," on infant sleep and development.

A randomized controlled trial conducted by Gradisar et al. (2016) in Australia compared graduated extinction and bedtime fading with a control group. The study found that infants who underwent sleep training fell asleep more quickly and woke less frequently during the night. At 12-month follow-up, there were no significant differences between groups in cortisol levels (a proxy for stress), emotional or behavioral development, or parent-child attachment.

A separate longitudinal follow-up study by Price et al. (2012) assessed children at age 6 who had previously participated in a sleep training trial as infants. The researchers found no significant differences in emotional or behavioral health, stress, or parent-child relationships compared to the control group, suggesting no long-term adverse effects from the intervention.

A meta-analysis by Mindell et al. (2006), which reviewed 52 studies of behavioral sleep interventions (including many with control groups), concluded that these interventions are generally effective in improving infant sleep. The review found no evidence of harm associated with these methods.

== Criticism ==
Sleep training in a separate room, under 6 months is not recommended due to the SIDS reduction factors at play. A committed caregiver in the same room for all day and night sleeps reduces the risk of SIDS by 50 percent. These guidelines for baby being in the same room differs from 6 months to 12 months in different countries. An ECAS study attributed 36 percent of total SIDS deaths to sleeping alone in a room.

Another key debate in sleep training revolves around getting the right balance between parental soothing and expecting baby to be independent. Attachment parenting is a parenting philosophy characterized by practices such as baby-wearing (carrying infants in slings or holding them frequently), long-term breastfeeding, co-sleeping (sharing the parental bed with the baby), and promptly responding to a baby's cries. Popular sleep training methods, such as the Ferber Method, rely on letting the baby cry for a certain number of minutes, to allow the child a chance to fall asleep more independently and move away from an over-reliance on parental assistance to fall asleep. Advocates of attachment parenting generally reject traditional sleep training methods that involve allowing a baby to cry, asserting that such practices do not align with meeting the child's immediate needs.

A study conducted also showed that sleep trained babies displayed elevated cortisol levels (a proxy for stress, although this study did not have control babies without sleep training), but were simply not signaling to their parents. However, other studies with randomized controls have failed to detect differences in attachment or cortisol levels. This includes methods such as gradual extinction and bedtime fading. Another method found to effectively reduce short- to medium-term infant sleep problems and associated maternal depression is Behavioral Infant Sleep Intervention.

One study reported parents waking up in the night less and feeling more parental competence in the group that was taught these behavioral techniques.

The sleep coaching industry has been criticized for being unregulated, suffering from excessive fees.

== See also ==
- Insomnia
- Biologically Normal Infant Sleep
