= John H. Kennell =

Doctor of pediatrics

John H. Kennell (January 9, 1922 – August 29, 2013) was a doctor of pediatrics and researcher known for his work in maternal bonding during childbirth and support of doulas.

== Biography ==
John Hawks Kennell was born on January 9, 1922, in Reading, Pennsylvania, to Doris Hawks and Carlyle Kennell. He grew up in Buffalo, New York and was valedictorian of Bennett High School. He attended medical school at the University of Rochester receiving his M.D. in 1946. He completed his residency at Harvard Medical School after a stint in the Navy. After his residency, he became chief resident at Boston Children's Hospital.

In 1952, Kennell moved to Cleveland as attending pediatrician in the neonatal unit of Case Western Reserve University Hospital. In this role, Kennell noticed how babies were being separated from their mothers promptly after birth and in the 1960s began researching how mothers bond with their babies along with Dr. Marshall H. Klaus. In 1976, the pair published “Maternal-Infant Bonding” which claimed that in the first few hours of birth, mothers and their infants were hormonally primed to form crucial bonds as a survival technique. These bonds created in the first few hours were said to improve mothering, increase the likelihood of breastfeeding, enhance child development, and decrease child abuse. The research came under criticism with opponents citing the inherent problems studying human behavior and claiming that the improved bonding effect is small and limited. Kennell and Klaus republished the book with a new title, "Parent-Infant Bonding" in 1982 which acknowledged their mistakes and weren't as specific about the bonding timetable as in the previous version. This research led to many hospitals to change their procedures to give new parents time with their infants, allow partners in the delivery room, and the baby's siblings to visit. Kennell later became interested in the bonding of parents whose infants died in delivery or soon after being born. This research led him to recommend parents hold their deceased infants.

In 1984, he was awarded the C. Anderson Aldrich Award from the American Academy of Pediatrics.

During Kennell's studies of maternal-infant bonding in the 1980s, he also noticed shorter labors when a female research assistant supported the women during delivery. The study "Effects of social support during parturition on maternal and infant morbidity" with Klaus, Steven Robertson, and Roberto Sosa demonstrated that trained labor companions, often known as doulas, reduces labor time, perinatal complications, and the need for medication and cesarean delivery. In 1992, he joined Dr. Marshall Klaus, Phyllis Klaus, Penny Simkin, and Annie Kennedy to form the first doula training and certification organization, DONA International (formerly Doulas of North America).

Kennell died on August 29, 2013.

== Bibliography ==
- Maternal-Infant Bonding, John Kennell, Marshall Klaus (1976).
- Parent-Infant Bonding, John Kennell, Marshall Klaus (1982).
- The Doula Book: How a Trained Labor Companion Can Help You Have a Shorter, Easier and Healthier Birth, John Kennell, Marshall Klaus, Phyllis Klaus (2003).
