= Marshall H. Klaus =

American neonatologist

Marshall Henry Klaus (June 6, 1927 – August 15, 2017) was a neonatologist who studied the effects of maternal bonding after birth.

== Biography ==
Klaus was born on June 6, 1927, in Lakewood, Ohio, to Dr. Max Henry Klaus and Caroline Epstein. As a child, his parents died and Klaus and his brother went to live with their uncle, a physician. He graduated from Case Western Reserve University Medical School specializing in pediatric pulmonology and neonatal development. A bout with polio left Kraus with a weakened right arm, so he chose a specialization that would be physically possible for him. In 1950, he married Lois Krieger, a chemist, with whom he had five children. The couple later divorced. He completed is residency in 1954 at Children's Hospital in Cleveland. During his year as Chief Resident, the hospital opened a ward for parents to stay with their children and was interested in the better patient care and satisfaction. In 1961, he completed a Pulmonary Medicine Fellowship at the University of California in San Francisco (UCSF) and moved took the position as Assistant Professor of Pediatrics at Case Western Reserve University.

In 1967, he became the neonatal director and in 1973 published his first book "Care of the High Risk Neonate" which established the discipline of Neonatology by introducing "new material via case problems and included expert commenters debating alternate lines of therapy where there was not yet a solid evidence base."

While studying mechanical ventilation at Stanford University, he noticed that mothers of infants in the neonatal intensive care unit had trouble bonding and with colleague Dr. John H. Kennell began to study maternal bonding after birth. In 1976, Klaus and Kennell published “Maternal-Infant Bonding” concluding that a mother's attachment to her baby is stronger if able to bond in the first few hours after birth. Bonding after birth was said to increase breastfeeding, enhance child development, and reduces child abuse. The research came under criticism with opponents citing the inherent problems studying human behavior and claiming that the improved bonding effect is small and limited. Many hospitals began to change their procedures to give new parents time with their infants, allow partners in the delivery room, and the baby's siblings to visit based on the book's recommendations.

In 1984, he was awarded the C. Anderson Aldrich Award for their contributions to the field of child development from the American Academy of Pediatrics (AAP).

In 1973, Klaus and Kennell were studying bonding in Guatemala where they noticed that when a female student stayed with the laboring mother, the labor was shorter. After a formal study in 1980, their research found that with supportive labor companions, or doulas, a woman's labor was shorter, discomfort and a need for a cesarean were decreased, and maternal bonding was increased. Their findings were published in the paper "Effects Of Social Support During Parturition On Maternal And Infant Morbidity." During his early studies of doulas, Klaus met Phyllis Stoller, whom he married in 1982. In 1992, Klaus and his wife Phyllis joined with Kennell, Penny Simkin, and Annie Kennedy to form the first doula certifying organization, Doulas of North America.

In 2002, the AAP named a grant in his honor, the Marshall Klaus Perinatal Research Awards, for neonatal fellows.

He died on August 15, 2017, in Palo Alto, California.

== Bibliography ==
- "Composition of Surface-Active Material Isolated from Beef Lung," Marshall H. Klaus, John A. Clements and Richard J. Havel (1961)
- Care of the High Risk Neonate, Marshall Klaus and Avroy Fanaroff (1973)
- Maternal Infant Bonding, Marshall Klaus, John Kennell (1976)
- Parent Infant Bonding (1981)
- "Effects Of Social Support During Parturition On Maternal And Infant Morbidity," Marshall H. Klaus, John H. Kennell, Steven S. Robertson and Roberto Sosa (1986)
- The Amazing Newborn (1987)
- Bonding: Building the Foundation of a Secure Attachment and Independence (1995)
- The Doula Book: How a Trained Labor Companion Can Help You Have a Shorter, Easier and Healthier Birth, John Kennell, Marshall Klaus, Phyllis Klaus (2003)
