= Meredith Small =

American anthropologist

- Born: November 20, 1950 (age 75)
- Education: University of California, Davis
- Scientific career
- Workplaces: Cornell University
- Thesis: Females Without Infants: a Comparison of Captive Rhesus Macaques (Macaca Mulatta) and Bonnet Macaques (Macaca Radiata) (1980)
- Doctoral advisor: Peter S. Rodman

Meredith Francesca Small (born 20 November 1950) is a professor emerita of Anthropology at Cornell University, a popular science author, and a prominent American primatologist and anthropologist. She was born in St. Louis, Missouri. She has been widely published in academic journals, and her research is presented in her most popular books: Our Babies, Ourselves Kids: How Biology and Culture Shape the Way We Raise Our Children, and What's Love Got to Do with It?. She spent many years studying both people and primate behavior. Her areas of interest are in the intersection of biology and culture, and how that has influenced parenting with an evolutionary focus. She specializes in female primate reproductive strategies, mating behavior, and is renowned for challenging cultured stereotypes regarding how we view infancy, parenthood, and various non-human female primates.

== Career ==
Small entered the field in the late 1970s working on captive macaques at the California Primate Center in Davis, California, where she received a Ph.D. in 1980 within biological anthropology. She trained as a primatologist and worked in the anthropological genetics laboratory of David Glenn Smith and spent one year in France studying the mating and mother-infant behavior of Barbary macaques. Small spent some time in Bali, Indonesia, working on crab-eating or long-tail macaques. In 1988 Small moved to Cornell University where she was a professor of anthropology until 2016, the first woman in the department to become a full professor. In 1995, she was named a Weiss Presidential Fellow, the highest teaching award at Cornell. She states that she spent thirty years teaching twenty-year-olds, and because it was her job to explore and learn about the world around her, this further fostered her passion for learning and communicating anthropology to the general public.

In Small's research, she challenged gendered and cultural regarding infancy and parenthood. She highlighted in her career that female primates exhibit agency and are not passive actors in reproduction, and even challenges male primate stereotypes arguing that they, too, can participate in parenting. She primarily focused on social dynamics in non-human and human primates, observes differing mating partnerships, discusses evolutionary mating and parenthood theories, and counters earlier male-centric models of fatherhood and mating systems. She frequently explored intersections of human culture and her research on non-human primates and how evolutionary history and culture influence reproduction, mating pairs, and parenthood and how those are all connected.

As noted by her page on Cornell University, Small has a research focus on macaques in captivity in the wild, female mating behavior, alloparent care, biological and physiological measures of reproductive success, the intersection of biology and culture, the evolution of human behavior, and how biology and culture influence parenting styles. Despite her having a wide span in academic journals and teachings, she currently works primarily with the media.

Small began writing extensively for the popular audience just before her move to Cornell, and by the 1990s, Small shifted into mainstream journalism, writing articles for such publications as Natural History, Discover magazine, Live Science, Medium, Scientific American and New Scientist. She also has contributed to National Public Radio (NPR) in All Things Considered as a commentator. She regards this work as a form of teaching. Due to her various forms of communicating anthropology to the public, she continues to be regarded highly in the anthropological and primatology field, as well as to public interests. She is the author of four trade books and the articles she writes cover a wide range of topics that are related to various intersections in biological anthropology. Small has written about topics such as chimpanzee hunting, family structures among the Bari of Venezuela, and even how animals experience culture, among various other topics.

In 2005, the American Anthropological Association (AAA) awarded her an Anthropology in Media award for "the successful communication of anthropology to the general public through the media" and for her "broad and sustained public impact at local, national and international levels". This was due to her making her research highly accessible to the general public and translating complex scientific research into more digestible forms for diverse audiences, notably through articles and book publishing's. Small's attention to detail and ability to expand and elaborate on topics whenever translating these scientific terms to the public sustained a lasting public impact and brought attention to anthropology and primatology.

Her articles have twice been included in The Best Science and Nature Writing series.

From 2007 until 2010 she wrote a weekly column called Human Nature for LiveScience.com and these can still be viewed online. In 2014, she published her first fiction book, the beginning of a series featuring detective Grace McCloud. Meredith Small still frequently participates in science journals and publishing.

In 2016, Small retired from Cornell, where she taught for over three decades, and moved to Philadelphia.

== Research after retirement ==
Small continues to write blog posts and contribute to academic research. While retired from Cornell, she is still very active in the anthropology community and continues to educate herself and others in the field. She has her own website where she frequently makes blog posts. While some of her posts are highly educational in nature, they contain a personal aspect that bring readers into Meredith Small's personal life, while also reflecting on biology and culture in a seamless way. Recently, she has written on her own experience with tuberculosis and how the American public is especially at risk and discusses research, statistics of TB, implications, and warns the public of contagious diseases and educating themselves. She wrote an article titled "Taking a Fulani Hat on the NewYork Subway" where she discusses "buying up other peoples' culture while staying home" and how this intersects with larger and more personal cultures. As of December 2025, Small has recently posted on other blogs as well, such as Medium where she discusses "Death and Roses".

Small has published articles on different platforms discussing the life and death of Jane Goodall, and her positive impact on not only anthropology, but primatology as well. In her personal blog, she highlights the personal impact Goodall had on not only the community, but herself and her daughter in her article titled "Jane Goodall, Influencer". She published a similar article in Medium with the sub header saying, "How Jane Goodall Taught Us All, Including My Young Daughter, to Never Give Up Trying to Make This a Better World". Small states that while Jane Goodall and herself were not close personal friends, they were acquaintances united for a common cause and had a few memorable moments that stuck out in Small's memory, especially in how Jane Goodall treated her young daughter. Small's article discussed intersections of personal relationships and Jane Goodall's professional contributions, and the impact her life and legacy have on academia and the general public's understanding of human evolution, chimpanzees, and humans impact on the environment.

Small shares book recommendations and related commentary through a website called BookDNA. The platform includes reflections on her experiences, as well as selected books and explanations of their relevance to topics such as exploration and the historical impact of maps. In addition to her academic work, the website reflects her continued engagement in public education and research-related activities.

== Books ==
- 1984 - Female Primates: Studies by Women Primatologists (edited by Meredith F. Small). A. R. Liss: New York
- 1993 - Female Choices; Sexual Behavior of Female Primates. Cornell University Press: Ithaca, NY.
- 1995 - What's Love Got to do with it? The Evolution of Human Mating. Anchor Books (Doubleday)
- 1998 - Our Babies, Ourselves; How Biology and Culture Shape the Way we Parent. Anchor Books (Doubleday).
- 2001 - Kids: How Biology and Culture Shape the Way We Raise Our Children. Doubleday.
- 2006 - The Culture of Our Discontent; Beyond the Medical Model of Mental Illness. Joseph Henry Press: Washington, DC.
- 2014 - Fall Creek. Lavori a Mano Press: Ithaca, NY
- 2020 - Inventing the World: Venice and the Transformation of Western Civilization. (Simon and Schuster)
- 2023 - Here Begins the Dark Sea: Venice, a Medieval Monk, and the Creation of the Most Accurate Map of the World. (Simon and Schuster)

== Selected articles ==
=== Popular science articles ===
A selected list of articles:

- 2003 How Many Fathers Are Best for a Child? Discover 24(4): 54-61
- 2002 Mother's Little Helpers. New Scientist 176(2372): 44-49
- 2002 So Near and Yet So Far. Natural History 111(5): 76-78
- 2002 String Theory. Natural History 111(3): 14-16
- 2002 The Happy Fat. New Scientist 175(2357): 34-39
- 2002 What You Can Learn From Drunk Monkeys. Discover 23(7): 104-106
- 2001 Do Animals Have Culture?. Scientific American 284(4):104-106

=== Live Science articles ===
Since 2007, Small has published 101 Articles with Live Science, mostly recent in 2022. She remains active in the community, and even post-retirement from Cornell University, she continues to communicate anthropological knowledge to the public in various forms.
