= Doula =

Non-medical companion

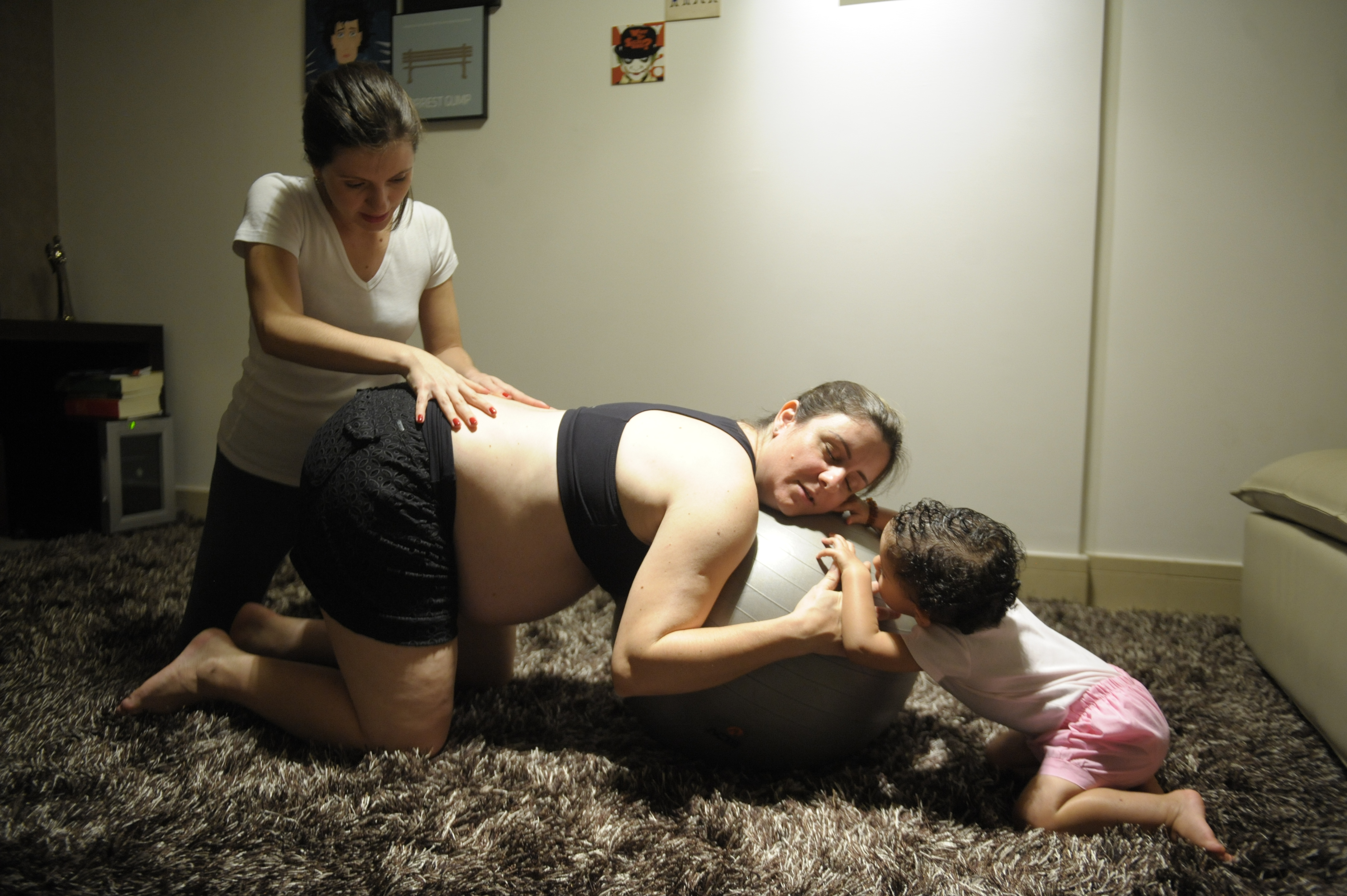
A doula (left) applying pressure to a pregnant woman during labor

A doula is a non-medical professional who provides guidance for the service of others and who supports someone (the doula's client) through a significant health-related experience, such as childbirth, miscarriage, induced abortion or stillbirth, as well as non-reproductive experiences such as dying. A doula might also provide support to the client's partner, family, and friends.

The doula's goal and role is to help the client feel safe and comfortable, complementing the role of the healthcare professionals who provide the client's medical care. Unlike a physician, midwife, or nurse, a doula cannot administer medication or other medical treatment or give medical advice. An individual might need to complete training to work as a doula, although training and certification processes vary throughout the world.

The contributions of doulas during reproductive experiences and end-of-life care have been studied and have been shown to benefit their clients. For example, a birth doula providing support during childbirth might increase likelihood of vaginal birth (rather than Caesarean section), decrease the need for pain medication during labor, and improve the perception of the birthing experience.

The benefits of a doula providing other types of support have been less well studied, but might improve a client's experience with medical care or help an individual cope with health transitions.

== History and etymology ==
The concept of having a companion providing support to the birthing woman dates back to prehistoric times, evidenced by archeological findings of stone carvings and statues and anthropological studies. However, the contemporary role of "doula" first emerged from the grassroots natural birth movement in the United States in the 1960s when women began desiring unmedicated, low-intervention births and began to have friends and others with formal or practical knowledge about childbirth provide them with support during pregnancy.

The term doula was first used in English in a 1969 anthropological study conducted by Dana Raphael, a protégée of Margaret Mead, with whom she co-founded the Human Lactation Center in Westport, Connecticut, in the 1970s. Raphael suggested it was a widespread practice that a female of the same species be part of childbirth, and in human societies this was traditionally a role occupied by a family member or friend whose presence contributed to successful long-term breastfeeding. Raphael derived the term from modern Greek (δούλα, doúla (Greek pronunciation: [ˈðula]), 'slave', 'woman servant'), as told to her by an elderly Greek woman, Eleni Rassias.

Two physician-researchers, Marshall H. Klaus and John H. Kennell, who conducted clinical trials on the medical outcomes of doula-attended births, adopted the term to refer to a person providing labor support. In 1992, Doulas of North America (later DONA International) was co-founded by Klaus, Kennell, Phyllis Klaus, Penny Simkin, and Annie Kennedy, becoming the first organization to train and certify doulas. The organization with the backing of the research of Klaus and Kennell helped lend credibility and professionalize doulas. Due to the lobbying efforts of DONA International, the term doula was accepted into the American Heritage Dictionary and Oxford Dictionary in 2003, followed by Merriam Webster Dictionary in 2004. Alternative names to this role include "childbirth assistant" and "monitrice", but they did not catch on as "doula" had.

In 2008, activists in New York City began the Doula Project, to expand the role of the doula to other reproductive experiences beyond birth, grounded in reproductive justice framework. The participants began working as abortion doulas and coined the term "full-spectrum doula" who support all pregnancy experiences and outcomes such as pregnancy termination, miscarriage and fetal loss. Full spectrum doula groups can be found in major cities in the United States.

== Types of support ==
=== Birth ===
==== Role ====
A doula focused on birth is also known as a birth companion, nonclinical birth worker, birth coach, or post-birth supporter, by providing continuous care before, during, or after in the form of information, advocacy, physical support, and emotional support. A birth doula is also called a labor doula. A birth doula might accompany a pregnant woman during labor and birth in place of or in addition to a partner, family member, or friend. Unlike these other birth companions, a doula has formal training in labor support. The kinds of support provided during childbirth might include physical assistance and comfort (massage, maintaining a supporting posture, or providing water), emotional support (providing company, encouragement or simply talking in a soothing tone of voice), acting as an advocate during childbirth (supporting the birthing woman's right to make decisions about their own body and baby to the medical team) and informational support (provide information about the birthing process and non-medication based forms of pain relief, and facilitating communication between their client and health providers).

Most doula-client relationships begin a few months before the baby is due. Before the labor, the doula and the family can develop a relationship where the pregnant woman and their support person (e.g. the other parent) feel comfortable asking questions, expressing their fears and concerns, and discussing birth preferences.

==== Benefits and limitations ====
Continuous support during labor provided by doulas has been associated with improved outcomes. For birthing individuals, doula care is associated with shorter labors, fewer cesarean sections and complications, the use of fewer medications and fetal extraction tools, positive psychological benefits, and more satisfaction with their birth experiences. For babies, doula care is associated with less time in neonatal intensive care units, fewer instances of a low five-minute Apgar score, and an increased likelihood of breastfeeding. A 2026 systematic review of US studies found that doula support was likely to be associated with lower rates of preterm birth and caesarean delivery. Cross-country research on the effects of doulas on childbirth and postnatal care is complicated by the variety of settings, cultures, and medical systems of individual countries and the characteristics of patients. These benefits appear to be contingent on the doula providing continuous rather than intermittent assistance and knowing the specific social and cultural setting within which their services are provided. Doula care can help reduce health disparities of those with the greatest need including those with less education, lower incomes, less preparation for childbirth and those lacking social support. Research which studied the effectiveness of female friends or relatives provided with minimal training supported this method's viability as a low-cost alternative to professional doulas.

In March 2014, the American College of Obstetricians and Gynecologists (ACOG) put out a Consensus Statement titled "Safe Prevention of Primary Cesarean Delivery" in which it wrote: "Increasing [someone's] access to non-medical interventions during labor, such as continuous labor support, also has been shown to reduce cesarean birth rates." In 2017 ACOG announced the need for all birthing individuals to have access to continuous labor support outside hospital staff, and wrote: "Evidence suggests that, in addition to regular nursing care, continuous one-to-one emotional support provided by support personnel, such as a doula, is associated with improved outcomes."

In 2026, ACOG directly addressed doula care with a committee statement titled "Partnering With Doulas in Clinical Settings" in order to assert that doulas improve health outcomes and patient experiences when they are valued members of a birth team. They wrote: "Doula–clinician partnerships have demonstrated improvements in communication and patient-centered care, accountability in the health care team, and continuity of care for individuals who have given birth." They also provide recommendations for clinicans and hospital systems on how to best foster symbiotic relationships with doulas in order to improve outcomes.

Despite ACOG's position and the recognition that doulas and medical staff can occupy complementary roles that provide opportunities for mutual learning and assistance, tensions between doulas and medical staff exist. To combat this, some hospitals have created internal doula training programs to reduce conflict between doulas and medical staff.

In 2017 the United Kingdom's Royal College of Midwives published a position statement on doulas, which supports the choice of the individual to hire a doula for their birth as long as the doula does not provide medical care.

A 2018 study examined how doulas were perceived in several different countries, including Egypt, Lebanon, Syria, Malawi, Sweden, Nepal, Russia, Canada, and the United States of America and found that having continuous support from a companion such as a doula was highly appreciated by most participants. However, perceptions may vary from country to country due to cultural factors, such as an emphasis on modesty and privacy, which might affect what kind of support a patient prefers.

A 2018 study examining news media discourse in China noted that Chinese doulas needed to register with official departments or organizations and are closely linked with midwifery. The doula profession was introduced in 1996 to mainland China and demand of their services increased since then, with many, especially women, citing dissatisfaction with medical care. After China's implementation of the Second-Child Policy, doula care was strongly linked to doula support in regard to family planning.

==== Training and certification ====
There is no law requiring doulas to become certified, however, certification can benefit professional doulas by providing structured education prior to entry into the field, access to a mentor, opportunities for networking, and client confidence. In North America, training generally takes the form of a two- to the three-day seminar, and some experience with childbirth. Trainees might have hands-on practice with various techniques used during childbirth, including maternal positions and movements, relaxation and breathing exercises and other measures that could be used for comfort. Certification can occur through organizations at various levels (local, national, or international) and some require positive evaluations from medical professionals. Certification may also require, in addition to attending a training course, time spent working or learning about maternity care and childbirth classes, and possibly a written exam. Some doulas train through distance education.

There is a movement to encourage certification and provide documentation of it on consumer websites such as DoulaMatch where an individual can find certified doulas, childbirth educators, yoga instructors, and other birth-related professionals. Doulas not trained by a formal organization can be controversial within medical settings due to a lack of formal medical education when a discussion regarding medical interventions in labor versus pursuing natural childbirth without an epidural or cesarean section arises.

Major doula organizations that offer certification programs include Birth Arts International, Birth Works, Birthing from Within, Childbirth and Postpartum Professional Association (CAPPA), DONA International, Hypnobirthing, International Childbirth Education Association (ICEA), and ProDoula. Because of the lack of standardization, doula organizations provide different courses with varying requirements and anyone can refer to themselves as a doula. Doulamatch.net, an online referral page for doulas, has offered a list of items that students should look for as they begin looking for training. Amy Gilliland, a researcher on doula care and culture, also lists some qualities a training program should have. Some theorists have stated that it might take college-level work or more in-depth online education in order to provide some of the communication skills that might be necessary.

==== Motivations and challenges ====
In 2010, a survey of professional Canadian doulas found that the common motivations for doula work include "desire to support women in childbirth, personal interest, and a wish to share their own positive birth experience with others" but did not see the work as a means to create steady income. Doulas of color also found motivation in providing care for their racial, ethnic and cultural communities so as to provide culturally competent care. Volunteer doulas often saw doula work as a way to "help others, to establish a practice as an employed doula, and to have a route into nursing or midwifery". From 2021 to present, Canada has specifically focused research on the cultural significance of indigenous practices in doula work.

A 2004 study of North American doulas identified challenges to doula work such as lack of support from clinicians, balancing doula work with family and other work obligations, and being on call. Volunteer doulas also found challenges in individuals' poor understanding of the doula's role, lack of clear boundaries, and complex socio-economic issues. Additionally, doulas often are challenged with the task to navigate their role in medicalized (hospital) births. Due to the social hierarchy and privilege that medical professionals have in medical settings doulas are often subordinate to doctors and physicians. Doulas have to negotiate the power dynamics between the patient and medical provider, while also establishing their legitimacy and role in the process of childbirth. They, therefore, have to be cognizant of the medical environment in which their client chooses to give birth in order to effectively advocate for their client's needs.

=== Antepartum ===
An antepartum doula provides help and support to someone who has been put on bed rest or is experiencing a high-risk pregnancy. Emotional, physical and practical support can be provided by an antepartum doula in this circumstance.

=== Postpartum ===
Postpartum doulas provide educational support and practical support in the home in the first weeks and months after childbirth or after adding an infant to the family. The same doula often provides both birth and postpartum services. Their services include a mixture of emotional support and practical help, such as infant care, breastfeeding support, information, advocacy and referral, partner support, sibling care, and household organization/work as the family adjusts to the addition of a new baby. There is some evidence that postpartum doula support can decrease postpartum depression and increase breastfeeding, with doulas providing education, resources, and support.

Other workers overlap in some of these services, such as maternity nurses, health visitors, newborn care specialists, lactation consultants, and, historically, monthly nurses. Traditionally in China, a 30- to 40-day rest period is recommended for new mothers after giving birth. During this time, a caregiver—an older family member or a professional postpartum doula, called yuesao (Chinese)—provides round-the-clock care for the newborn, cooking, and housework so the mother can recover. Since the beginning of the 21st century, the number of professional yuesao has increased. A 2015 regulation establishes quality standards for mother-child care services, including a six-level qualification scale for yuesao. Many mothers spend their postpartum period at home, but there are also private clinics that admit mothers for this duration.

=== Full-spectrum ===
Full-spectrum doulas extend the role of a birth attendant and provide support for all reproductive experiences which connect the role to the larger reproductive justice movement. This can include support for abortion, miscarriage, stillbirth, queer family planning, adoption, and fertility as well as extending services to women, men, transgender and gender non-conforming individuals. Abortion doulas focus on providing support to clients having an induced abortion. They provide emotional, physical, and informational support virtually or in person. Full-spectrum doulas often identify as activists as well as service providers and emphasize the human rights of their clients in the hopes of ending social stereotypes.

==== Pregnancy Loss Doulas ====
Pregnancy loss doulas are people who specialize in cases of miscarriage and stillbirth. They can be associated with and trained as abortion doulas, "death doulas" or full spectrum doulas who continue with a client from the prenatal period. Miscarriage and still birth doulas provide grief support for families.

==== Abortion ====
Abortion doulas provide care before, during, and after an abortion, with support varying by person and their informational, emotional, physical, and practical needs. Doulas work in a variety of situations, including community collectives and as solo practitioners, and provide abortion support as a service in their full-spectrum practice. There are no certifications specifically for abortion doulas that are administered nationally or through individual states.

In the United States following the landmark decision, Dobbs v. Jackson Women's Health Organization, doulas expect to be contacted more frequently about abortion support as access becomes more limited. They are taking precautions to retain online anonymity to better protect patients and themselves and navigate the threat of legal action.

==== Gender transition ====
A gender doula provides care before, during, and after the gender transition process for transgender and non-binary individuals. Gender doulas may also serve as patient advocates for their clients against medical practitioners who may misgender or undermine the gender identity of the client.

=== End-of-life and critical care ===
End-of-life or death doulas care for critically ill adults in geriatric care, and during death. While some doulas work independently or on a volunteer basis, others might work in association with a health care service, such as a palliative care service. The roles of an end-of-life doula include not only physical tasks, such as assisting with posture or making the bed comfortable but also emotional and psychological tasks, such as providing guidance and support.

In variant usage, end-of-life support is sometimes also referred to as a "doula" or "delirium doula."

== Integration of doulas into formal medical care ==
=== Birth doulas ===
In the United States, doulas can be found in hospitals, in community-based programs, in doula agencies, and as private practitioners. They might also be reimbursed by insurance companies or out-of-pocket by clients. Since insurance companies typically do not cover the cost of hiring a doula, they are more popular among middle- and upper-class parents than among parents with lower incomes. Since doula care has the potential to lower maternity costs and reduce health disparities, there is a push for coverage through Medicaid reimbursement programs. As of 2022, four states – Oregon, Minnesota, Virginia, and Wisconsin – had implemented reimbursement programs. In 2019, New York State launched a doula pilot program for Medicaid reimbursement in Erie and Kings Counties. In that same year, New York State passed a bill to certify doulas to lend legitimacy to the profession and to pave the way for Medicaid reimbursement from the federal government, becoming the first state to do so. Doulas in New York, however, expressed concern about the bill, having not been involved with the bill's writing, citing that state certification would make doulas more beholden to the formal medical system, be a hit to business if certification programs are not approved by the state, and might prevent community doulas from working with low-income individuals.

In the UK, the National Health Service and promotion of midwifery for low-risk pregnancies provide a continuity of care to pregnant women, but there has still been an upswing in doulas in the country. This pattern has been suggested to result from the lack of midwives available and a move to provide doulas to individuals at greater risk for poor outcomes.

A 2019 study reviewed perceptions of labor companionship across mostly high-income countries and found barriers that prevent the universal implementation of doula care. These challenges are due to a multitude of factors dealing with perception (for example, providers not understanding the benefits or roles of doulas, and medical aspects of treatment being seen as more important) and logistics (chiefly gaps in policy, difficulty of integration, and lack of training).

=== Community-based doulas ===
Community-based doulas work with under-served communities of which they are often members, to provide a sense of cultural humility that fosters trust and strengthens relationships between the doula and their client. The services provided are often low cost, and expand in the amount of support offered compared to traditional doulas and consider physical, social spiritual and emotional needs. Services include an increased amount of home visits, preparation for the birthing experience, education, guidance navigating health care systems, language support, screening for mental health, and food security needs.

Additionally, community-based doula models provide insight in the creation of policies that will support those families and under-served communities. These doulas also actively engage policy makers by recommendations on certification and Medicaid coverage, integration into medical care, and participating on advisory boards.

=== Prison doulas ===
Since the 1980s, women incarcerated in the US have increased nearly 800 percent, including an estimated 12,000 pregnant women incarcerated annually. Pregnant prisoners are allowed to be shackled in more than 20 states and are forced to return to jail within 24 hours after giving birth, without their infants. The environmental factors of the penal system are shown to increase the risks associated with poor perinatal outcomes and have long-term health risks for the women and their children. The implementation of prison doulas rose out of the movement to end shackling for pregnant and laboring women from the prison abolition, human rights, and reproductive and birth justice movements in the early 2000s. Prison doula organizations work with those incarcerated to provide prenatal care, childbirth education, birth attendance, and breast feeding support. By providing doula services to jails, prisons, recovery centers, and county hospitals, doulas work to improve birth experiences and bonding as well as improved recovery. In studies of women who received doula services while incarcerated, the women reported increased happiness around their pregnancy; greater feelings of empowerment; a sense of normalcy around birth; and support during separation from their infant.

While well-received, prison doula support is not widespread in the United States and most programs are local due to the lack of an established federal standard of medical care for pregnant incarcerated individuals. In 2018, Washington was the first state to provide access to midwifery and doula services for incarcerated women for prenatal care, delivery, and postpartum care. However, the bill does not establish means of funding the services, and does not establish guidelines for care.
