= Ethnopediatrics =

Branch of research in pediatrics

Ethnopediatrics is a branch of research devoted to understanding the child-rearing practices of families around the world and throughout time. This relatively new field is informed by traditional disciplines like child development research, anthropology, psychology, and pediatrics.

== Origins ==
In October 1994, Carol M. Worthman conducted a workshop at Emory University introducing this new field. The workshop was attended by participants from psychology, pediatrics, public health, and anthropology. The impetus was the growing understanding that health care improvements can be made more effective when all the affecting cultural influences are taken into account.

== Cultural analysis ==
The ethnopediatric perspective analyzes the effects of a culture on a child's health and well-being by asking these questions:

- What are the culture's attitudes and beliefs towards illness and wellness?
- What are the culture's patterns of addressing (or not addressing) symptoms of illness?
- What are the culture's experiences and familiarity (or lack thereof) with a particular disease or a set of symptoms?
- What are its ideas of the developmental stages that children move through?
- How much does the culture value children? And which aspects of development are most valued (intellect, motor skills, verbal skills, etc.)

== Specific aim ==
The specific aim of ethnopediatrics is to improve the welfare of children around the world in a way that is informed by and in harmony with the local culture. By promoting a biocultural framework for understanding the well-being and development of the child, facilitating cross-disciplinary dialog, and analyzing the interests of the individual child in the context of the surrounding cultural, social, and political framework, the field has the potential to better inform public health policy and even directly influence prevailing childcare practices.
