= James J. McKenna =

American biological anthropologist

James Joseph McKenna (born 1948) is an American biological anthropologist. McKenna founded and directed the Mother-Baby Behavioral Sleep Laboratory at the University of Notre Dame, studying the physiology and behavior of co-sleeping mothers and infants. He has published over 140 scientific articles in medical and anthropological journals on the topics of co-sleeping, breastfeeding, evolutionary medicine, and SIDS, and is the author of several trade and academic books. He also regularly lectures on specialized topics relating to co-sleeping and breastfeeding, particularly to pediatric medical professionals and parents.

== Education ==
McKenna received his undergraduate degree in anthropology from the University of California, Berkeley in 1970. In 1972, he earned his master's degree from San Diego State University, and in 1975 earned his Ph.D. in biological anthropology from the University of Oregon, Eugene.

== Research career ==
McKenna began his research career studying the social behavior of monkeys and apes, with an emphasis on parenting behavior and ecology. However, following the birth of his son in 1978, his research focus shifted. McKenna has stated that, when reading through existing parenting literature, he was surprised to see that it contradicted his years of research and training about the universal aspects of primate life, particularly when it came to feeding and sleeping arrangements. This inspired him to apply the principles of human behavioral evolution to an understanding of human infancy.

At the University of California, Irvine School of Medicine, his neurology research team pioneered the first behavioral and electro-physiological studies documenting differences between mothers and infants sleeping together and apart.

In 1997, McKenna founded the Mother-Baby Behavioral Sleep Laboratory at the University of Notre Dame. It is both a research and teaching laboratory within the Department of Anthropology. At the lab, his team studies how sleeping environments reflect and respond to family needs. In particular, these studies focus on how sleeping environments affect mothers, breastfeeding, and infants’ physiological and psychological well-being and development. Using traditional anthropological and medical research techniques, the laboratory responds to myths and controversies to provide scholars, parents, and the news media with accurate scientific information on a variety of sleeping arrangements, including safe co-sleeping practices. McKenna directed the Mother-Baby Behavioral Sleep Laboratory for 22 years.

=== Breastsleeping ===
In 2014, McKenna and his colleague Lee T. Gettler coined the term "breastsleeping" to describe a type of co-sleeping between a breastfeeding mother and infant that occurs specifically in an environment free from proven risk factors. Drawing on the historic anthropological relationship between breastfeeding and infant sleep, breastsleeping is considered to be the safest form of bedsharing, practiced worldwide for all of human history. It relies on four central tenets:

1. With easy access to the breast, babies will night feed without fully waking their mother or themselves, meaning both mother and child get more sleep.
2. Bedsharing increases the ease and frequency of night feedings and has been known to extend breastfeeding duration.
3. Mothers who consistently breastfeed are proven to be physiologically attuned to their babies. Under appropriate safety conditions, breastfeeding mothers are able to maintain awareness, rouse when necessary, and protect their babies throughout the night.
4. Breastfeeding infants are equally physiologically attuned to their mothers. Sleeping directly beside their mothers helps babies regulate their developing physiological functions, such as breathing.

McKenna recently retired from the University of Notre Dame. He remains (in absentia) an Emeritus Professor there, continuing to direct the sleep lab he created as an information and resource center. He continues to teach, research, lecture, and write as an Endowed Professor at Santa Clara University in California.

== Accolades ==
In 2008, McKenna received the Sheedy Teaching Award from the University of Notre Dame for "sustained exceptional contributions" to the University. That same year, he received the American Anthropological Association's Anthropology in The Media Award, in recognition of his work educating the public to the importance of anthropological concepts via television, radio, and print media.

In 2009, he was inducted as a Fellow in the American Association for the Advancement of Science. Along with Sarah Mosko, he won the Shannon Award from the National Institute of Child Health and Human Development for his SIDS research.

== Personal life ==
McKenna resides in San Francisco with his wife, Joanne. They have a son and one grandchild.
