= Development of the human body =

Development of the human body is the process of growth to maturity. The process begins with fertilization, where an egg released from the ovary of a female is penetrated by a sperm cell from a male. The resulting zygote develops through cell proliferation and differentiation, and the resulting embryo then implants in the uterus, where the embryo continues development through a fetal stage until birth. Further growth and development continues after birth, and includes both physical and psychological development that is influenced by genetic, hormonal, environmental and other factors. This continues throughout life: through childhood and adolescence into adulthood.

== Before birth ==
Development before birth, or prenatal development (from Latin natalis 'relating to birth') is the process in which a fertilized egg develops into a zygote, an embryo, and then a fetus during the course of gestation. Prenatal development starts with fertilization and the formation of the zygote, the first stage in embryonic development which continues in fetal development until birth.

=== Fertilization ===
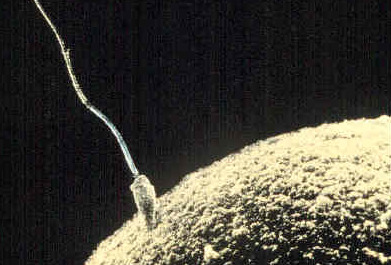
Sperm fertilizing an egg

Fertilization occurs when the sperm successfully enters the ovum's membrane and the two cells fuse to form a single cell zygote. Each gamete (sperm and egg) are haploid, meaning they have half the number (23) of chromosomes present in a typical human cell, one copy of each chromosome. When they fuse, the resulting zygote is diploid, with 46 chromosomes, and has unique genetic material that is a combination of both parents. Some gametes form improperly and retain two copies of one or more chromosomes. When one of these improper gametes fuses with a regular gamete, they create a zygote with trisomy, a disorder in which a human has three copies of a certain chromosome instead of two.

The germinal stage refers to the time from fertilization, through the development of the early embryo, up until implantation. The germinal stage is over at about 10 days of gestation.

The zygote contains a full complement of genetic material with all the biological characteristics of a single human being, and develops into the embryo. Embryonic development has four stages: the morula stage, the blastula stage, the gastrula stage, and the neurula stage. Prior to implantation, the embryo remains in a protein shell, the zona pellucida, and undergoes a series of rapid mitotic cell divisions called cleavage. A week after fertilization the embryo still has not grown in size, but hatches from the zona pellucida and adheres to the lining of the mother's uterus. This induces a decidual reaction, wherein the uterine cells proliferate and surround the embryo thus causing it to become embedded within the uterine tissue. The embryo, meanwhile, proliferates and develops both into embryonic and extra-embryonic tissue, the latter forming the fetal membranes and the placenta. In humans, the embryo is referred to as a fetus in the later stages of prenatal development. The transition from embryo to fetus is arbitrarily defined as occurring 8 weeks after fertilization. In comparison to the embryo, the fetus has more recognizable external features and a set of progressively developing internal organs. A nearly identical process occurs in other species.

=== Embryonic development ===
Human embryonic development refers to the development and formation of the human embryo. It is characterised by the process of cell division and cellular differentiation of the embryo that occurs during the early stages of development. In biological terms, human development entails growth from a one-celled zygote to an adult human being. Fertilization occurs when the sperm cell successfully enters and fuses with an egg cell (ovum). The genetic material of the sperm and egg then combine to form a single cell called a zygote and the germinal stage of prenatal development commences. The embryonic stage covers the first eight weeks of development; at the beginning of the ninth week the embryo is termed a fetus.

The germinal stage refers to the time from fertilization through the development of the early embryo until implantation is completed in the uterus. The germinal stage takes around 10 days. During this stage, the zygote begins to divide, in a process called cleavage. A blastocyst is then formed and implanted in the uterus. Embryonic development continues with the next stage of gastrulation, when the three germ layers of the embryo form in a process called histogenesis, and the processes of neurulation and organogenesis follow.

In comparison to the embryo, the fetus has more recognizable external features and a more complete set of developing organs. The entire process of embryonic development involves coordinated spatial and temporal changes in gene expression, cell growth and cellular differentiation. A nearly identical process occurs in other species, especially among chordates.

=== Fetal development ===
A fetus is a stage in the human development considered to begin nine weeks after fertilization. In biological terms, however, prenatal development is a continuum, with many defining features distinguishing an embryo from a fetus. A fetus is also characterized by the presence of all the major body organs, though they will not yet be fully developed and functional and some not yet situated in their final location.

Stages in prenatal development

=== Maternal influences ===
The fetus and embryo develop within the uterus, an organ that sits within the pelvis of the mother. The process the mother experiences whilst carrying the fetus or embryo is referred to as pregnancy. The placenta connects the developing fetus to the uterine wall to allow nutrient uptake, thermo-regulation, waste elimination, and gas exchange via the mother's blood supply; to fight against internal infection; and to produce hormones which support pregnancy. The placenta provides oxygen and nutrients to growing fetuses and removes waste products from the fetus' blood. The placenta attaches to the wall of the uterus, and the fetus' umbilical cord develops from the placenta. These organs connect the mother and the fetus. Placentas are a defining characteristic of placental mammals, but are also found in marsupials and some non-mammals with varying levels of development. The homology of such structures in various viviparous organisms is debatable, and in invertebrates such as Arthropoda, is analogous at best.

== After birth ==
=== Infancy and childhood ===
Childhood is the age span ranging from birth to adolescence. In developmental psychology, childhood is divided up into the developmental stages of toddlerhood (learning to walk), early childhood (play age), middle childhood (school age), and adolescence (puberty through post-puberty). Various childhood factors could affect a person's attitude formation.

- Prepubescence
  - Neonate (newborn)
  - Infant (baby)
  - Toddler
  - Play age
  - Elementary school age, may coincide with preadolescence (preteen)

Approximate outline of development periods in child development

The Tanner stages can be used to approximately judge a child's age based on physical development.

For North American, Indo-Iranian (India, Iran) and European girls	For North American, Indo-Iranian (India, Iran) and European boys
Thelarche (breast development) age 10½ (8–13); Pubarche (pubic hair) age 11 (8½–13½); Growth spurt age 11¼ (10–12½); Menarche (first menstrual bleeding) age 12½ (10½–14½); Wisdom tooth eruption age 15½ (14–17); Adult height reached age 15½ (14–17)	Gonadarche (testicular enlargement) age 11½ (9½–13½); Pubarche (pubic hair) age 12 (10–14); Growth spurt age 13 (11–15); Spermarche (first ejaculation) age 13 (11–15); Wisdom tooth eruption age 17 (15–19); Completion of growth age 17 (15–19)

=== Puberty ===
Puberty is the process of physical changes through which a child's body matures into an adult body capable of sexual reproduction. It is initiated by hormonal signals from the brain to the gonads: the ovaries in a girl, the testicles in a boy. In response to the signals, the gonads produce hormones that stimulate libido and the growth, function, and transformation of the brain, bones, muscle, blood, skin, hair, breasts, and sex organs. Physical growth—height and weight—accelerates in the first half of puberty and is completed when an adult body has been developed. Until the maturation of their reproductive capabilities, the pre-pubertal physical differences between boys and girls are the external sex organs.

On average, girls begin puberty around ages 10–11 and end puberty around 15–17; boys begin around ages 11–12 and end around 16–17. The major landmark of puberty for females is menarche, the onset of menstruation, which occurs on average between ages 12 and 13; for males, it is the first ejaculation, which occurs on average at age 13. In the 21st century, the average age at which children, especially girls, reach puberty is lower compared to the 19th century, when it was 15 for girls and 16 for boys. This can be due to any number of factors, including improved nutrition resulting in rapid body growth, increased weight and fat deposition, or exposure to endocrine disruptors such as xenoestrogens, which can at times be due to food consumption or other environmental factors. Puberty which starts earlier than usual is known as precocious puberty, and puberty which starts later than usual is known as delayed puberty.

Notable among the morphologic changes in size, shape, composition, and functioning of the pubertal body, is the development of secondary sex characteristics, the completion of a human's transition from girl to woman or from boy to man.

=== Adulthood ===
Biologically, an adult is a human or other organism that has reached sexual maturity. In human context, the term adult has additional meanings associated with social and legal concepts. In contrast to a legal minor, a legal adult is a person who has attained the age of majority and is therefore regarded as independent, self-sufficient, and responsible. The typical age of legal majority is 18 years in most contexts, although the definition of majority may vary by legal rights and country.

Human adulthood encompasses psychological adult development. Definitions of adulthood are often inconsistent and contradictory; an adolescent may be biologically an adult and display adult behavior but still be treated as a child if they are under the legal age of majority. Conversely, a legal adult may possess none of the maturity and responsibility that is supposed to define them; the mental and physical development and maturity of an individual has been proven to be greatly influenced by their life circumstances.

== Organ systems ==
Human organs and organ systems develop in a process known as organogenesis. This begins in the third week of embryonic development, when the gastrula forms three distinct germ layers, the ectoderm, mesoderm and endoderm. The ectoderm will eventually develop into the outer layer of skin and nervous system. The mesoderm will form skeletal muscles, blood cells, the reproductive system, the urinary system, most of the circulatory system, and the connective tissue of the torso. The endoderm will develop into the epithelium of the respiratory and gastrointestinal tracts and several glands.

== Linear growth ==
During childhood, the bones undergo a complex process of elongation that occurs in a specific area called the epiphyseal growth plates (EGP). This process is regulated by various hormones and factors, including the growth hormone, vitamin D, and others. These hormones promote the production of insulin-like growth factor-1 (IGF-1), which plays a key role in the formation of new bone cells. Adequate nutrient intake is essential for the production of these hormones, which are critical for proper bone growth. However, a lack of proper nutrition can hinder this process and result in stunted growth.

Linear growth takes place in the epiphyseal growth plates (EGP) of long bones. In the growth plate, chondrocytes proliferate, hypertrophy and secrete cartilage extracellular matrix. New cartilage is subsequently remodeled into bone tissue, causing bones to grow longer. Linear growth is a complex process regulated by the growth hormone (GH) – insulin-like growth factor-1 (IGF-1) axis, the thyroxine/triiodothyronine axis, androgens, estrogens, vitamin D, glucocorticoids and possibly leptin. GH is secreted by the anterior pituitary gland in response to hypothalamic, pituitary and circulating factors. It affects growth by binding to receptors in the EGP, and inducing production and release of IGF-1 by the liver. IGF-1 has six binding proteins (IGFBPs), exhibiting different effects on body tissues, where IGFBP-3 is most abundant in human circulation. IGF-1 initiates growth through differentiation and maturation of osteoblasts, and regulates release of GH from the pituitary through feedback mechanisms. The GH/IGF-1 axis is responsive to dietary intake and infections. The endocrine system seems to allow for rapid growth only when the organism is able to consume sufficient amounts of nutrients and signaling from key nutrients such as amino acids and zinc to induce production of IGF-1 is present. At the same time inflammation and increased production of pro-inflammatory cytokines may cause GH resistance and a decrease in circulating IGF-1 and IGFBP-3 which in turn reduces endochondrial ossification and growth. However, the EGP appears to conserve much growth capacity to allow for catch-up growth. Concerns have been raised about associations between catch-up growth and increased risk of non-communicable diseases in adulthood. In a large study based on 5 birth cohorts in Brazil, Guatemala, India, the Philippines and South Africa, faster linear growth at 0–2 years was associated with improvements in adult stature and school performance, but also an increased likelihood of overweight (mainly related to lean mass) and a slightly elevated blood pressure in young adulthood.

== See also ==
- Auxology
- Developmental biology
- Human body
- Life-history theory
- List of youth-related terms
- Outline of human anatomy
