= Acceleration (human development) =

Human development trend

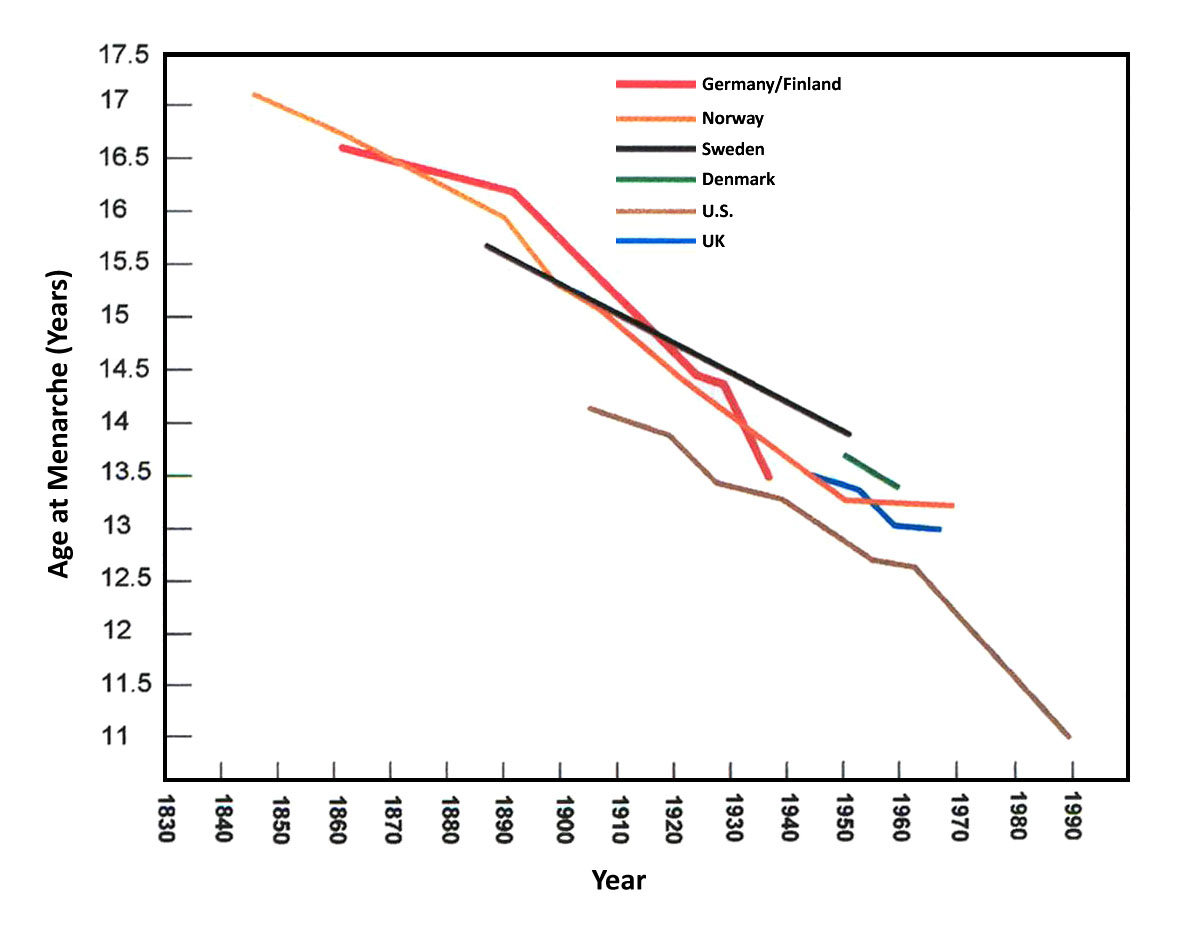
Secular trend in decrease in age of menarche in Western European and North American girls After:

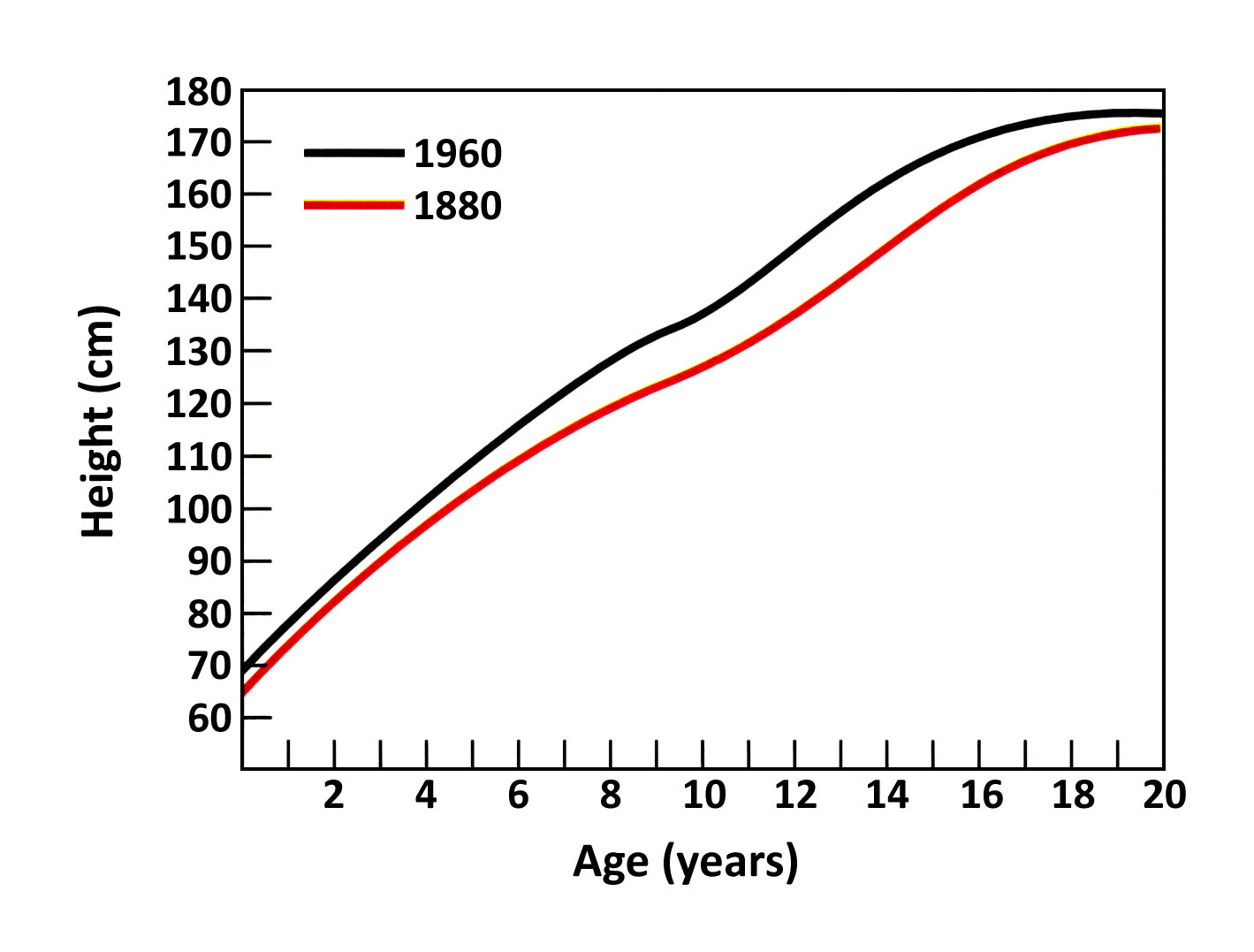
Stature comparison between American-born children of European descent and earlier populations of the same heritage After:

Acceleration in human development process is the phenomenon which has been registered in many populations around the world. This applies equally to the growth of certain anthropometric parameters and the speed of reaching sexual maturity. These facts illustrate the results of secular changes in body height and appearance of the first menstruation (menarche).

Increases in human stature are a main indicator of improvements in the average health of populations. The newest data set for the average height of adult male birth cohorts, from the mid-nineteenth century to 1980, in 15 European countries was studied (in the populations listed).

During a century average height increased by 11 cm, representing a dramatic improvement of this phenomenon. The apparent acceleration of body height occurred during the periods around the two World Wars and after the Great Depression.

In the mid-nineteenth century, European girls' menarche occurred at the average age of 16.5 years. One hundred years later, this age was reduced to under 12 years.

- Increase in adult height of birth cohorts (cm/decade)

Population	1871–1875 to 1976–1980	1871–1875 to 1911–1915	1911–1915 to 1951–1955	1951–1955 to 1976–1980
Austria	1.11	0.59	1.50	1.32
Belgium	1.08	0.41	1.59	1.32
Bosnia and Herzegovina				2.00
Denmark	1.24	0.58	1.83	1.37
Finland				0.84
France	0.91	0.57	1.10	1.16
Germany	1.25			1.20
Great Britain	0.93	1.14	0.99	0.50
Greece				1.55
Ireland	0.80			1.00
Italy	1.06	0.72	1.14	1.50
Netherlands	1.41	1.34	1.32	1.67
Norway	0.93	0.79	1.49	0.26
Portugal			0.94	1.72
Spain	1.19	0.74	0.79	2.53
Sweden	0.97	0.68	1.25	1.00
Average	1.08	0.76	1.27	1.26
Standard Deviation	0.18	0.28	0.31	0.54

== Secular acceleration ==
The term "secular acceleration" encompasses:

1. an increase in human height;
2. the shift of menarche and menopause in women to a later age; this form of acceleration is disputed, or there may even be a decrease in age;
3. the rise in life expectancy.

The trend is assumed to have begun in the first half of the 19th century. In recent times, these changes appear to have come to a halt.

Average adult height by year of birth, global

Annual change in average female height by year of birth

=== Increase in body height ===
In industrialised nations, human height has increased from generation to generation since the mid-19th century. For example, a tall man (95th percentile, meaning 95% of men are shorter) measured around 184.1 cm in 1975, but 191.0 cm in 2000. Studies from military conscription show that average male height rose steadily from 174 cm (for the 1938 birth cohort) to nearly 180 cm. For women, average height increased from 156 cm in 1956 to 166 cm in 1975. Newborn length has also risen: the proportion of babies over 55 cm long grew from 3.4% in 1986 to 10.1% in 2001. After the mid-19th century, average height in Central and Northern Europe has grown by about 1–2 cm per decade; since the 1980s, the rate has slowed to about 1 cm or less per decade. Evidently, height acceleration has diminished in Central and Northern Europe at the start of the 21st century and may come to a complete halt by the mid-21st century.

==== Consequences of height increase ====
From a medical perspective, the increased growth tendency is problematic, as it has led to a higher incidence of myopia through elongation of the eyeball.

Many standards remained unchanged during the 20th century, resulting in ergonomic issues and, consequently, problems such as postural damage. In the 21st century, standards from DIN, for example, and the European CEN/ISO, under the auspices of the European Union, undergo continuous revision. For instance, DIN EN 13402-3 on clothing size labelling was updated in 2014, and the ISO 8559 standard for garment sizes in 2017.

Annual change in average male height by year of birth

Acceleration poses challenges for the ergonomic design of products such as motor vehicles. Vehicle design typically accommodates body sizes from the 5th-percentile woman (only 5% of women are smaller) to the 95th-percentile man. The acceleration rate ranges from 1.4 mm per year for the 5th-percentile woman to 2.3 mm per year for the 95th-percentile man. The height difference between these percentiles increased from 331 mm in 1974 to 350 mm in 1995, making it increasingly difficult to design vehicles that comfortably accommodate all users.

=== Shift in menarche and menopause ===
In industrialised nations, a shift towards later onset of menarche and menopause in women has been reported. In obstetrics, this presents challenges when older women increasingly give birth. However, the opposite trend has also been observed (see graph in the lead section).

More recent studies in Central Europe found no acceleration in the onset of puberty: menarche typically begins shortly before the 13th birthday, unchanged.

=== Rising life expectancy ===
Life expectancy is increasing worldwide. The consequences are far-reaching and multifaceted: part of global population growth stems from people living longer. Moreover, demographic changes alter the sociological structure of the population, significantly shifting the ratio of working-age individuals to elderly ones and requiring adjustments in pension systems and care provisions.

Average human height in the eastern Mediterranean region from the Upper Paleolithic to 1996

=== Influencing factors ===
In the Middle Ages, many people in Central Europe were shorter than in modern times, as evidenced by knightly armour, door frames, bed lengths, and skeletal remains. Comparisons between medieval and modern conditions led to the notion that growth acceleration has been acting over many centuries, whether through epigenetics, constant selection pressure, or other causes. This impression is incorrect, however, as numerous Stone Age bone finds demonstrate: in the Paleolithic, average Homo sapiens height from about 150,000 years ago was comparable to today's. With the Neolithic and the introduction of agriculture in Central Europe around 6,000 years ago, average height reached a minimum before increasing again. Citizens of the Roman Empire 2,000 years ago had statures only slightly shorter than modern inhabitants of those regions. In the Middle Ages, average height in Central Europe declined, though not continuously, and largely reflecting nutritional conditions. Average height thus mirrors the nutritional situation during the growth period, encompassing prenatal time and the first 18 years of life. This explanation, known as the nutrition theory, was formulated by human geneticist Widukind Lenz in 1949.

Among immigrants in Germany, children born in the country were on average taller than those born in their parents' homeland. Compared to the native German population, immigrants were generally shorter, but their Germany-born offspring grew to approximately the average German height. These data underscore that growth acceleration results from environmental conditions.

== Developmental acceleration ==
Developmental acceleration occurs when:

- an individual's development is advanced compared to their age group, or
- a generation's development is advanced compared to previous generations.

Tooth eruption begins earlier. A particularly significant developmental acceleration is sexual acceleration, leading to earlier onset of puberty.

The term "acceleration" regarding body height can also refer to developmental acceleration—a growth spurt—without resulting in substantial height differences between generations.

The term "secular trend" (or psychophysical acceleration) refers to the advancement of maturation processes in modern society, likewise a form of developmental acceleration.

== See also ==
- Human body development
