= Pubarche =

Debut of pubic hair following the onset of puberty

Pubarche (/ˈpjuːˌbɑːrki/) refers to the first appearance of pubic hair at puberty. It is one of the earliest physical changes of puberty and can occur independently of complete puberty. It is usually the second sign of puberty, after thelarche in females and gonadarche in males (though in females, it can also happen before thelarche, but this is less common).

The early stage of sexual maturation, also known as adrenarche, is marked by characteristics including the development of pubic hair, axillary hair, adult apocrine body odor, acne, and increased oiliness of hair and skin. The Encyclopedia of Child and Adolescent Health corresponds SMR2 (sexual maturity rating) with pubarche, defining it as the development of pubic hair that occurs at a mean age of 11.6 years in females (range 9.3–13.9 years) and 12.6 years in males (range 10.7–14.5 years). It further describes that pubarche's physical manifestation is vellus hair over the labia or the base of the penis. See Table 1 for the entirety of the sexual maturity rating description.

A study researched whether thelarche pathway, beginning puberty with breast development alone, or the pubarche pathway, beginning puberty with pubic hair development alone, represents the true pubertal development. The study is an observational, longitudinal cohort study. The study cohort is limited to a group of black and white girls who were seen annually for ten years. It is concluded in the research that pubarche may represent true pubertal maturation.

== Assessment ==
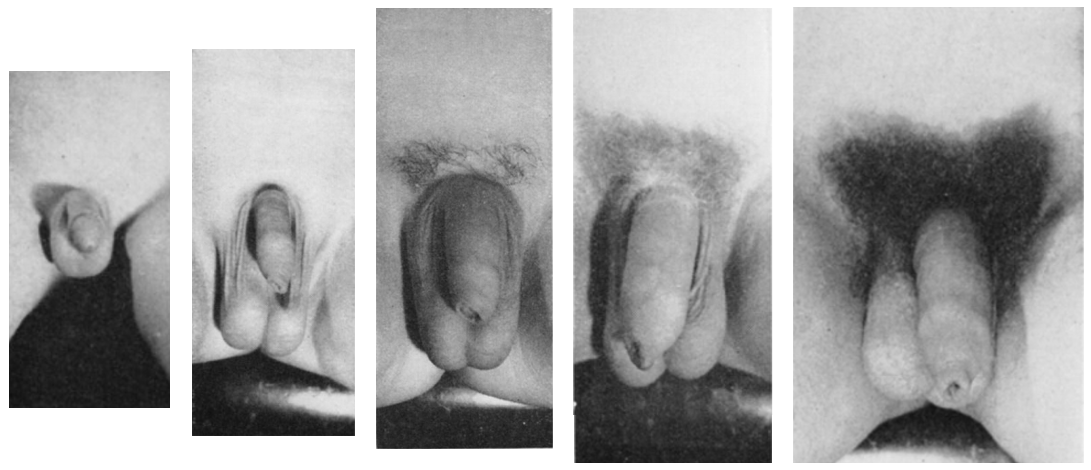
Five Tanner stages of male genitalia and pubic hair, The Adolescent Period

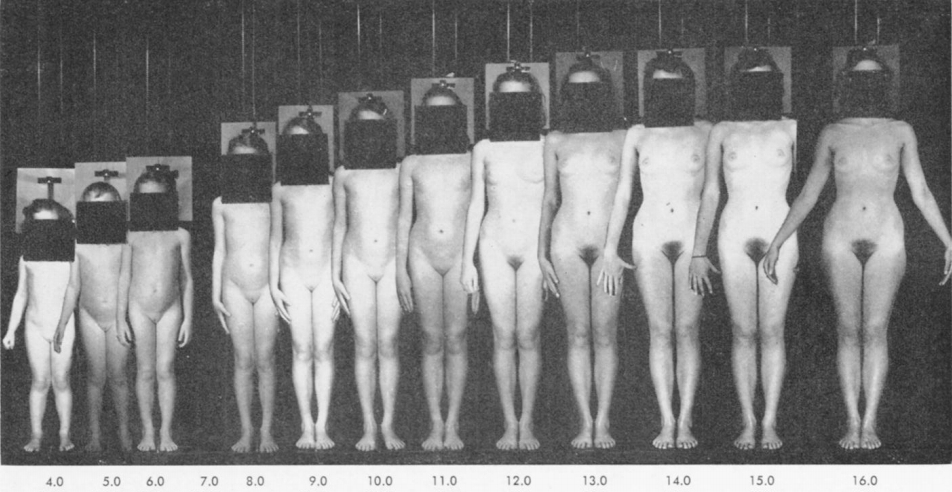
Stages of female genitalia and pubic hair during puberty

The Tanner scale remains the gold standard for determining pubarche. In clinical settings, this scale is primarily used by physicians, nurses, or other trained healthcare providers as part of a physical examination to assess the stage of puberty in children and adolescents, though in some cases the stage of puberty can be self-assessed.

Table 1
Tanner stage	Description of pubic hair development
SMR 1	Prepubertal – No pubic hair
SMR 2	Pubarche – Sparse, fine, straight, downy hair over labia or penis
SMR 3	Appearance of terminal hair – Adult quality, confined to the pubis
SMR 4	Terminal hair fills the pubic region, not beyond inguinal crease
SMR 5	Terminal hair extends onto medial thighs, achieving full adult distribution
SMR 6	Terminal hair extends up the linea alba toward the umbilicus (only in males)

== Average age ==
The average beginning of pubarche varies due to many factors, including environmental exposures, nourishment, weight, race and ethnicity, and geographical location. First (and often transient) pubic hair resulting from adrenarche may appear between ages of 10 and 12 at the beginning of puberty.

=== Environmental exposures ===
DDT and its metabolite, DDE

Chemical toxins in the environment are one of many factors influencing adolescent development. In the early 1970s, more than 4000 people were accidentally exposed to polybrominated biphenyls (PBBs). A study was conducted in the child-bearing women exposed to the toxin, with their baby girls reaching menarche by the age of 11.6 years, compared to girls who had low exposure reaching menarche by the age of 12.2–12.6 years. In everyday life, people are exposed to a various number of pesticides, with a large amount found to be disruptive to the endocrine system. Although dichlorodiphenyltrichloroethane (DDT) and the metabolite dichlorodiphenyl dichloroethane (DDE) were banned in the United States in the 1970s, countries around the world are still using these pesticides.

=== Geographical location and nutritional needs ===
Geographical location and zones also plays a part in the timing of pubarche. A study was done in different zones in Nigeria and found that males in the Northeast, Northwest, and Southwest had an earlier timing of pubarche compared to the males in the Southeast, whereas females had delayed pubarche in the Southeast regions of Nigeria. Within these regions, socio-economic classes were also taken into consideration. They found that households with a higher economic status posed an increased risk of premature, or an early onset of pubarche, possibly related to food being easily accessible. Nutrition is vital in adolescent development. Failure to meet average nutritional needs, such as calcium and vitamin D for bone growth, may result in growth stunting. Over-nourishment and/or living a sedentary lifestyle can lead to obesity which can also affect adolescent pubarche. The Dietary Guidelines for Americans 2010 declared that females between the ages of 9 and 13 years should meet a caloric intake of 1400 to 2200, while females between the ages of 14 and 18 years should meet a caloric intake of 1800 to 2400 calories a day.

== Premature pubarche ==
Premature pubarche, or precocious pubarche, refers to the appearance of pubic hair before the age of 8 in females or before the age of 9 in males. Premature pubarche is one marker of "incomplete, partial, or dissociated precocious puberty", where incomplete puberty refers to the premature development of one secondary sexual characteristic, such as premature thelarche or premature pubarche. Premature adrenarche, as indicated by elevated levels of steroids that are naturally produced by the body (e.g., DHEAS), is the most common cause of premature pubarche. Premature pubarche is linked to adrenarcheal androgen levels with dehydroepiandrosterone sulfate (DHEAS) of 40–130 ųg/dL.

However, premature pubarche may also arise independently of adrenarche. Premature pubarche is a subset of precocious puberty which divide into 1) true precocious puberty that includes complete and central precocious puberty and 2) incomplete puberty, which has three subsets: premature thelacrche, premature pubarche and isolated menarche. When adrenarche, an increase in adrenal androgen production, central puberty, and all disease-causing conditions have been excluded, the term isolated premature pubarche is used to describe the unexplained development of pubic hair at an early age in people without other hormonal or physical changes of puberty. Other potential indicators of premature puberty should also be considered when diagonosing premature pubarche, such as hyperandrogenemia (high levels of androgen in the blood) and virilization.

Premature pubarche is also a symptom of other hormone- and puberty-related medical conditions, including polyendocrine metabolic ovarian syndrome (PMOS), and classic and non-classic congenital adrenal hyperplasia.

=== Clinical examination ===
When premature pubarche has been identified, the clinical examination primarily involves the assessment of signs indicating an elevation of androgens in the body, as well as overall body growth and bone age. If these factors appear normal, it is considered "simple premature pubarche", and it is recommended to monitor its progression to distinguish between central precious puberty or adolescent polyendocrine metabolic ovarian syndrome (PMOS). If these factors, especially body growth and bone age, appear to increase faster than usual, tests for various hormones may be ordered. These tests may include testosterone, 17-OH, DHEAS, and Synacthen test.

=== Treatment ===
Scientists have traditionally thought that premature pubarche has no significant effect to the body, and this is reflected in the lack of a scientific consensus with respect to treatment of premature pubarche. However, it has now been shown clinically that it could be a forerunner of the metabolic syndrome, a cause clinical ovarian androgen excess and hyperinsulinemia in adolescence. Studies have shown that females with premature pubarche and lower birth weight obtained reduced height as adults because of early onset of puberty and a shorter duration of puberty. There is ongoing study on metformin therapy in these females with the goal to improve final height. The use of metformin has been shown clinically to prevent ovarian hyperandrogenism development in females with premature pubarche. A randomized control trial studied the effect of metformin 850 mg daily for 12 months compared to placebo. The results show that all abnormalities regarding insulini sensitivity, serum androgens, lipids, total and truncal fat mass, and lean body mass were reversed within 6 months. The untreated group had data that continued to deviate from the normal range. Later on, a cohort study replicated these results.

== Delayed pubarche ==
Delayed pubarche can be caused by numerous aspects. This can include insufficient hormones, medical or genetic conditions (i.e., Turner syndrome, hypogonadotropic hypogonadism), and chemicals that interfere with the hormones in the body. In young males, genetic differences that impacts the function of enzymes can affect how steroids are eliminated in urine. This can influence the development of pubic hair and can impact the physical appearance from person to person. In young females, the development of breasts and pubic hair can occur at different times. Some may experience breast development before the start of pubic hair growth, and vice versa. Therefore, in order to determine if delayed pubarche is a health issue or not, looking for the signs of puberty happening and the specific timing of it is important. The determination of the underlying cause of delayed pubarche can be done so with specific tests of antibodies, karyotype, and hormone levels (i.e., cortisol, thyroid stimulating hormone).

=== Adrenal insufficiency ===
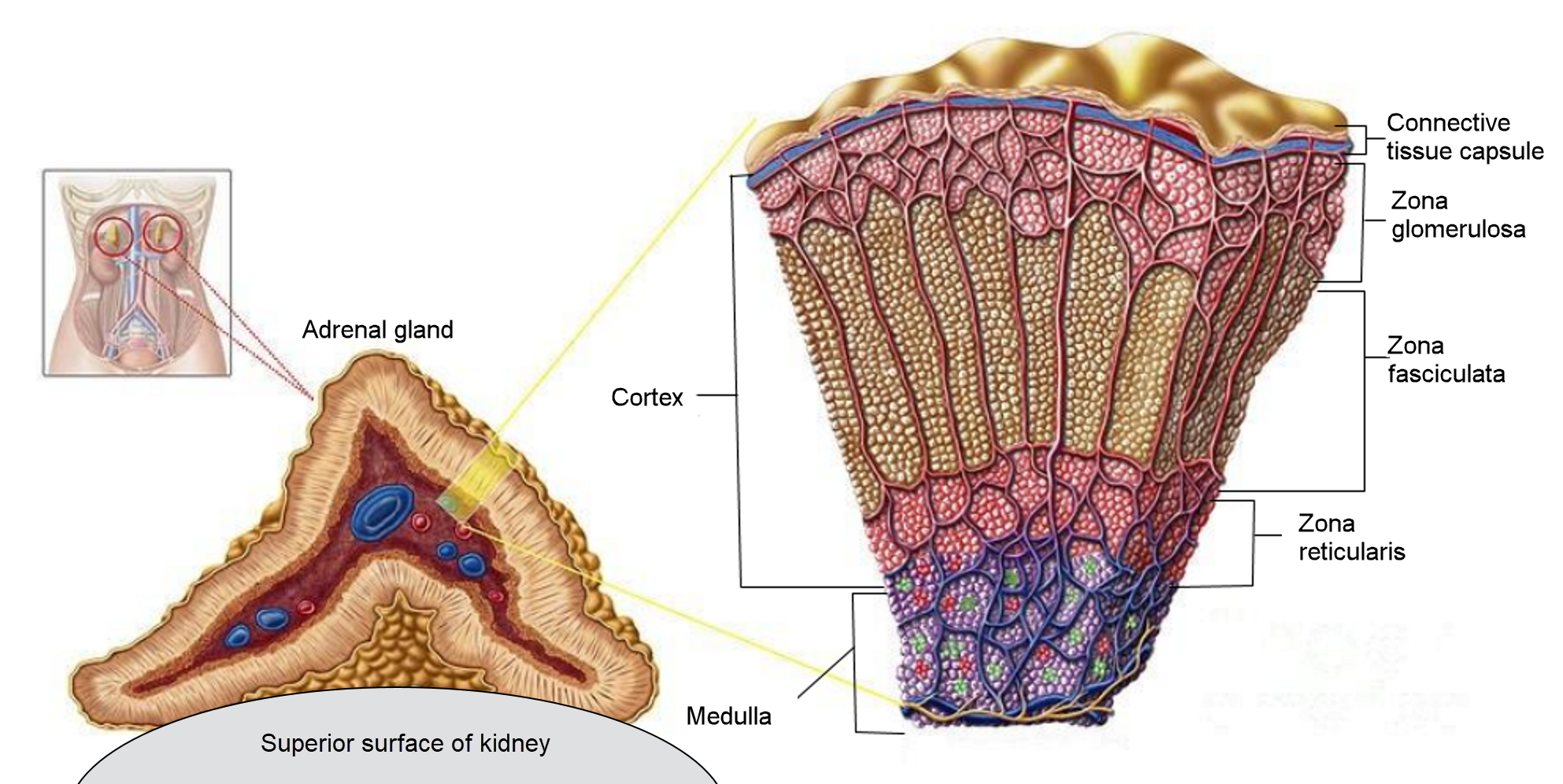
Adrenal gland

Adrenal insufficiency is a life-threatening medical condition in which the adrenal gland is damaged. This leads to not enough hormones being produced, which include glucocorticoids and mineralcorticoids. These types of hormones are crucial for the regulation of many functions in the body and with not enough levels of these hormones that are produced by the adrenal glands, it can lead to primary adrenal insufficiency. Delayed pubarche can be expected in young individuals with this medical condition due to the lack of hormones that aid for pubic hair growth. Therefore, if signs and symptoms of adrenal insufficiency are present such as fatigue, weakness, abdominal pain, or any history an autoimmune disease, adrenal insufficiency should be taken into consideration as an underlying cause for delayed pubarche.

=== Turner syndrome ===
Turner syndrome is a genetic condition that affects the nerves and brain, which can lead to certain physical and clinical features such as a greater chance for certain diseases, shortness in height, or abnormal heartbeat sounds. For some individuals with Turner syndrome, the sign and growth of pubic hair can sometimes be delayed or even be absent. This is especially in females with Turner syndrome who have premature ovarian failure. One possible explanation for this is that ovaries are important for the adrenal gland regulation of dehydropiandrosterone (DHEA). The role of DHEA is to be transformed into various androgens, which play a crucial role during pubarche. Therefore, much high levels of androgens may be required in order to meet the levels of androgens in comparison to ovaries that work properly.

=== Hypogonadotropic hypogonadism ===
Another cause of delayed puberty in both males and females is hypogonadotropic hypogonadism, which is a condition in which the male and female genitalia produce little to none of the sex hormones. This is a temporary condition in adolescents, usually caused by various stresses, including disease states such as asthma, ulcerative colitis, and sickle cell anemia. Specifically in males, this condition will result in low testosterone levels. Low levels of testosterone can cause levels of other hormones to rise, such as the luteinizing hormone (LH), the follicle-stimulating hormone (FSH), and the gonadotropin-releasing hormone (GnRH). Hypogonadotropic hypogonadism is more prevalent in females, which usually develops under conditions such as anorexia nervosa or if the female individual participates in an abundant amount of exercise. With these situations decreasing body fat, both estrogen production and secretion will also decrease resulting in delayed puberty, and with it, delayed pubarche. Other health conditions that can cause hypogonadotropic hypogonadism include ovarian failure and autoimmune diseases of the ovaries. Regardless of whether hypogonadotropic hypogonadism is acquired or congenital in males and females, it is always important for providers to conduct detailed family and social histories.

=== Treatment ===
With a lack of secondary sources to provide standardized procedures or guidelines to follow in treating delayed pubarche, many studies have been used to find formulations that work best in both males and females. In males diagnosed with constitutional delay in puberty and growth (CDPG), a short-course of testosterone in low doses is used to initiate puberty. In females diagnosed with CDPG, a short-course of estrogen in low doses is used to initiate puberty. Testosterone is available via oral route or intramuscular injection (IM), with IM being the preferred method of administration because oral testosterone has been shown to have liver toxicity side effects. Estrogen is available via oral route and IM; however, oral estrogen is the preferred method of administration. Upon initiation of treatment and thereafter, the adolescent must be monitored for pubertal development, which includes breast development in females and enlargement of the testicles in males. A provider can make a clinical judgment to stop treatment and monitor development while an adolescent is off therapy.

There seems to be no guideline or standard treatment for hypogonadotropic hypogonadism; however, the table below (Table 2) shows different formulations of the treatments available as well as the initial doses and adult doses. The estrogen and progesterone formulation, also known as an oral contraceptive or hormonal birth control, should not be used to induce puberty. The transdermal and oral formulation of testosterone is also not preferred to induce puberty in males.

Table 2. Formulations of estrogen, progesterone and testosterone treatment
	Brand name	Initiation Dose	Adult Dose
Estrogen Formulation			
Transdermal	Vivelle	6.25–12.5 mcg twice daily	25–100 mcg twice weekly
Oral	Estrace	0.35 mg daily	1–4 mg daily
Progesterone Formulation			
Oral	Provera	Added after first vaginal bleed or after 2 years of treatment	10 mg day for 10 days each month 100–200 mg daily for 10–21 days each month
Testosterone Formulation			
Intramuscular	Depot-Testosterone	50–100 mg monthly	200–250 mg every 2–4 weeks

In patients with Turner syndrome (TS), treatment formulations differ. The initiation dose is a fraction of the adult dose in most cases but this can also differ between different formulations available. In females, doses are started low and slowly titrated up over years. Oral formulations are not preferred because they pose for the risk of first-pass metabolism, affecting the normal function of the liver. The preferred administration of estrogen is transdermal, such as a patch. A study found that the females with TS using the transdermal estrogen formulation had an improved bone mineral content and uterine development.

== See also ==
- Puberty
- Adrenarche
- Gonadarche
- Thelarche
- Menarche
- Spermarche
- Androgen
- Estrogen
