= Puberty =

Physical transition from a child to an adult

Puberty is the process of physical changes through which a child's body matures into an adult body capable of sexual reproduction. It is initiated by hormonal signals from the brain to the gonads: the ovaries in a female, the testicles in a male. In response to the signals, the gonads produce hormones that stimulate libido and the growth, function, and transformation of the brain, bones, muscle, blood, skin, hair, breasts, and sex organs. Physical growth—height and weight—accelerates in the first half of puberty and is completed when an adult body has been developed. Before puberty, the external sex organs, known as primary sexual characteristics, are sex characteristics that distinguish males and females. Puberty leads to sexual dimorphism through the development of the secondary sex characteristics, which further distinguish the sexes.

On average, females begin puberty at age 10.5 and complete puberty at ages 15–17; males begin at ages 11.5–12 and complete puberty at ages 16–17. The major landmark of puberty for females is menarche, the onset of menstruation, which occurs on average around age 12.5. For males, first ejaculation, spermarche, occurs on average at age 13. In the 21st century, the average age at which children, especially females, reach specific markers of puberty is lower compared to the 19th century, when it was 15 for females and 17 for males (with age at first periods for females and voice-breaks for males being used as examples). This can be due to any number of factors, including improved nutrition resulting in rapid body growth, increased weight and fat deposition, or exposure to endocrine disruptors such as xenoestrogens, which can at times be due to food consumption or other environmental factors. However, more modern archeological research suggests that the rate of puberty as it occurs now is comparable to other time periods. Growth spurts began at around 10–12, but markers of later stages of puberty such as menarche had delays that correlated with severe environmental conditions such as poverty, poor nutrition, and air pollution. Puberty that starts earlier than usual is known as precocious puberty, and puberty which starts later than usual is known as delayed puberty.

Among the morphologic changes in size, shape, composition, and functioning of the pubertal body, is the development of secondary sex characteristics, the "filling in" of the child's body; from girl to woman, from boy to man. Derived from the Latin puberatum (age of maturity), the word puberty describes the physical changes to sexual maturation, not the psychosocial and cultural maturation denoted by the term adolescent development in Western culture, wherein adolescence is the period of mental transition from childhood to adulthood, which overlaps much of the body's period of puberty.

== Differences between male and female puberty ==
Approximate outline of development periods from childhood to early adulthood. Puberty is marked in green at right.

Hormone feedback cycles: 1 Follicle-stimulating hormone – FSH 2 Luteinizing hormone – LH 3 Progesterone 4 Estrogen 5 Hypothalamus 6 Pituitary gland 7 Ovary 8 Pregnancy – hCG (Human chorionic gonadotropin) 9 Testosterone 10 Testicle 11 Incentives 12 Prolactin – PRL

Two of the most significant differences between puberty in females and puberty in males are the age at which it begins, and the major sex steroids involved, the androgens and the estrogens.

Although there is a wide range of normal ages, females typically begin the process of puberty around age 10½; males at ages 11½–12. Puberty generally ends between 15–17 for females and 16–17 for males. Females attain reproductive maturity about four years after the first physical changes of puberty appear. In contrast, males accelerate more slowly but continue to grow for about six years after the first visible pubertal changes.

For males, the androgen testosterone is the principal sex hormone; while testosterone is produced, all males' changes are characterized as virilization. A substantial product of testosterone metabolism in males is the estrogen estradiol. The conversion of testosterone to estradiol depends on the amount of body fat and estradiol levels in males are typically much lower than in females. The male "growth spurt" also begins later, accelerates more slowly, and lasts longer before the epiphyses fuse. Although males are on average 2 centimetres (0.8 in) shorter than females before puberty begins, adult men are on average about 13 centimetres (5.1 in) taller than women. Most of this sex difference in adult heights is attributable to a later onset of the growth spurt and a slower progression to completion, a direct result of the later rise and lower adult male levels of estradiol.

The hormonal maturation of females is considerably more complicated than in males. The main steroid hormones, testosterone, estradiol, and progesterone as well as prolactin play important physiological functions in puberty. The production of gonadal steroids in females starts with production of testosterone, which is typically quickly converted to estradiol inside the ovaries. However the rate of conversion from testosterone to estradiol (driven by FSH/LH balance) during early puberty is highly individual, resulting in very diverse development patterns of secondary sexual characteristics. Production of progesterone in the ovaries begins with the development of ovulatory cycles in females (during the lutheal phase of the cycle), before puberty low levels of progesterone are produced in the adrenal glands of both males and females. Estradiol levels rise earlier and reach higher levels in women than in men. While estradiol promotes growth of the breasts and uterus, it is also the principal hormone driving the pubertal growth spurt and epiphyseal maturation and closure.

== Puberty onset ==
Puberty is preceded by adrenarche, marking an increase of adrenal androgen production between ages 6–10. Adrenarche is sometimes accompanied by the early appearance of axillary and pubic hair. The first androgenic hair resulting from adrenarche can be also transient and disappear before the onset of true puberty.

The onset of puberty is associated with high GnRH pulsing, which precedes the rise in sex hormones, LH and FSH. Exogenous GnRH pulses cause the onset of puberty. Brain tumors which increase GnRH output may also lead to premature puberty.

The cause of the GnRH rise is unknown. Leptin might be the cause of the GnRH rise. Leptin has receptors in the hypothalamus which synthesizes GnRH. Individuals who are deficient in leptin fail to initiate puberty. The levels of leptin increase with the onset of puberty, and then decline to adult levels when puberty is completed. The rise in GnRH might also be caused by genetics. A study discovered that a mutation in genes encoding both neurokinin B as well as the neurokinin B receptor can alter the timing of puberty. The researchers hypothesized that neurokinin B might play a role in regulating the secretion of kisspeptin, a compound responsible for triggering direct release of GnRH as well as indirect release of LH and FSH.

=== Effects of early and late puberty onset ===
Several studies about puberty have examined the effects of an early or a late onset of puberty in males and females. In general, females who enter puberty late experience positive outcomes in adolescence and adulthood, while females who enter puberty early experience negative outcomes. Males who have earlier pubertal timing generally have more positive outcomes in adulthood but more negative outcomes in adolescence, while the reverse is true for later pubertal timing.

==== Females ====
Outcomes have generally indicated that early onset of puberty in females can be psychologically damaging. The main reason for this detrimental effect is the issue of body image. As they physically develop, gaining weight in several areas of the body, early-maturing females usually look larger than females who have not yet entered puberty. A result of the social pressure to be thin, the early-maturing females develop a negative view of their body image. In addition, people may tease the females about their visible breasts, forcing the early-maturing female to hide her breasts by dressing differently. Embarrassment about a more developed body may also result in the refusal to undress for gym. These experiences lead to lower self-esteem, more depression and poorer body image in these early-maturing females.

Furthermore, as physical and emotional differences set them apart from people in their same age group, early-maturing females develop relationships with older people. For instance, some early-maturing females have older malefriends, "attracted to the females' womanly physique and femaleish innocence." While having an older malefriend might improve popularity among peers, it also increases the risk of alcohol and drug use, increased sexual relations (often unprotected), eating disorders and bullying.

Generally, later onset of puberty in females produces positive outcomes. They exhibit positive behaviors in adolescence that continue to adulthood.

==== Males ====
In the past, early onset of puberty in males has been associated with positive outcomes, such as leadership in high school and success in adulthood. However, recent studies have revealed that the risks and problems of early maturation in males might outweigh the benefits.

Early-maturing males develop "more aggressive, law-breaking, and alcohol abusing" behaviors, which result in anger towards parents and trouble in school and with the police. Early puberty also correlates with increased sexual activity and a higher instance of teenage pregnancy, both of which can lead to depression and other psychosocial issues.

On the other hand, late-maturing males develop lower self-esteem and confidence and generally have lower popularity among peers, due to their less-developed physiques. Also, they experience problems with anxiety and depression and are more likely to be afraid of sex than other males.

== Changes in males ==
=== Genital development ===
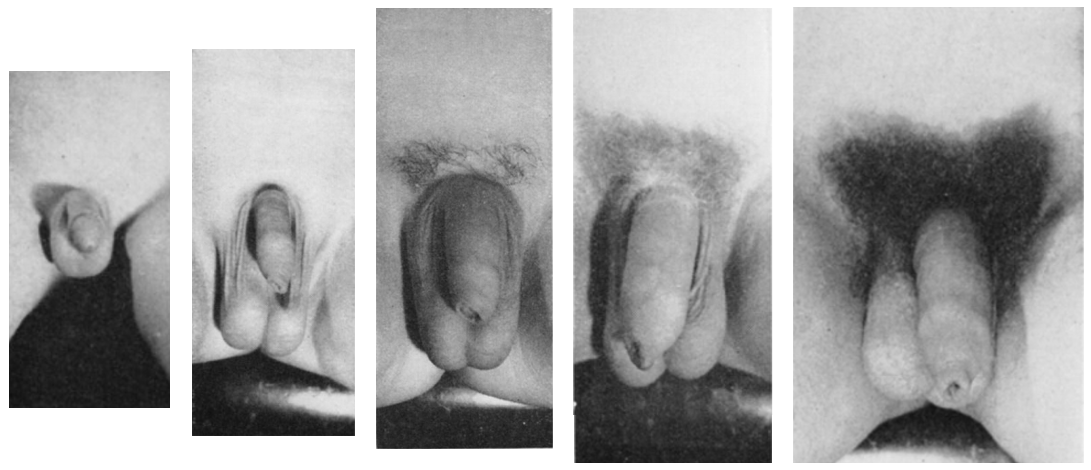
Tanner stages of male genitalia

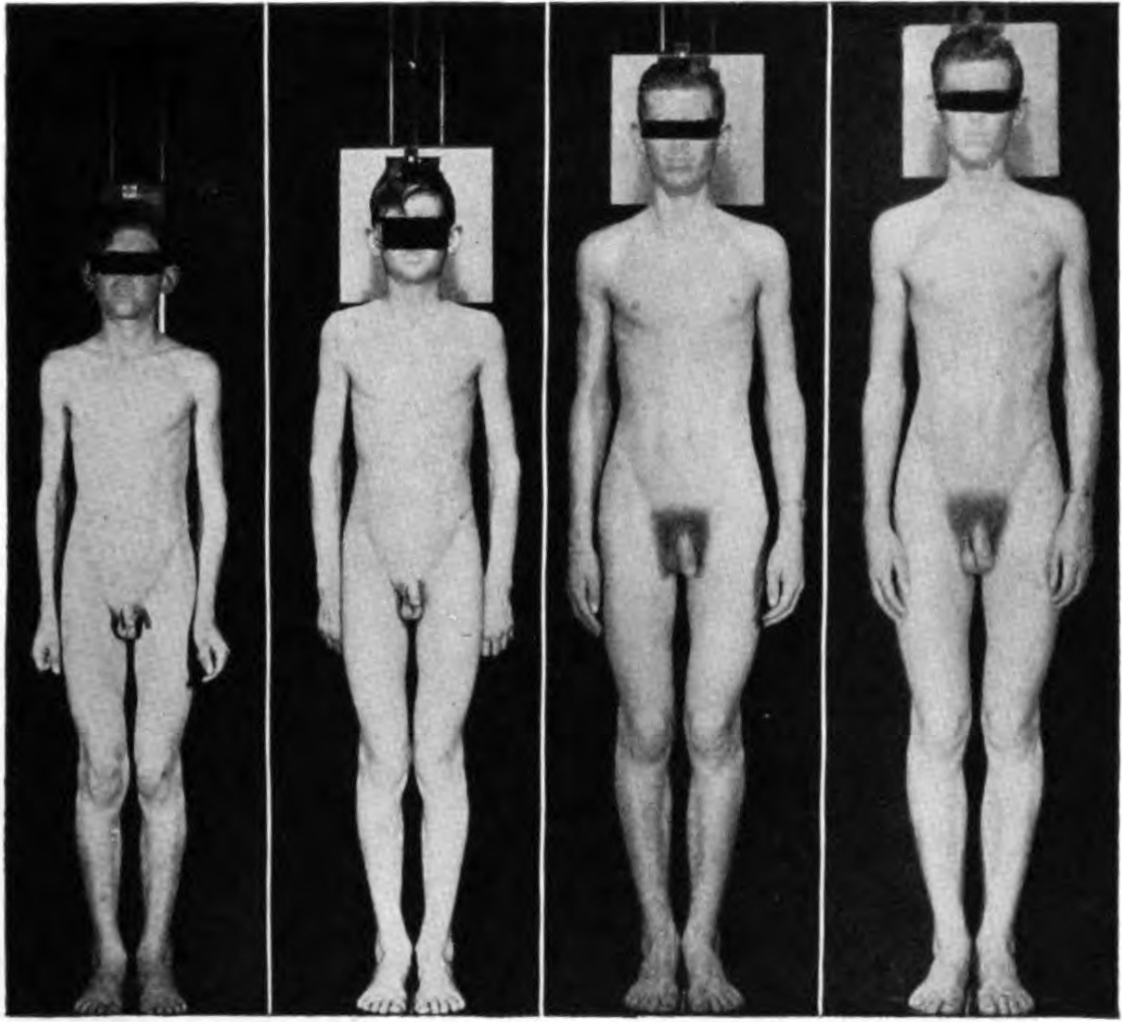
A male at 11.3 years (prepubertal), 12.5 years, 14.9 years and 16.3 years (postpubertal)

The Tanner scale tracks male pubertal development over five stages numbered I (prepubescent) to V (postpubescent) using testicular size and other genital markers. Testes in prepubertal males (stage I) change little in size from 1 year of age to the onset of puberty, averaging about 2–3 cm in length and about 1.5–2 cm in width. Puberty begins at 9.5–13.5 years (11.5 years on average) with the emergence of pubic hair at the base of the penis and the enlargement and reddening of the testicles and scrotum during stage II. During stage III, which begins at 10.1–14.6 years (12.4 years on average), the penis lengthens, pubic hair spreads across the pubis, and the testicles begin to produce sperm (spermatogenesis). This sperm mixes with fluids produced by the prostate to produce semen, which a male's erect penis can ejaculate and impregnate a female. Ejaculation sometimes occurs during sleep; this phenomenon is known as a nocturnal emission.

During stage IV, which begins at 11.2–15.3 years (13.2 years on average), the width of the penis increases, the pubic hair continues to spread, and the glans penis and corpora cavernosa enlarge to adult proportions. This continues until the genitals reach their adult size and pubic hair spreads to the thighs during stage V, which occurs at 16.5 years on average.

Although erections occur in male prepubescent children and infants, and can even occur before birth, they occur much more frequently after puberty. Such erections often occur involuntarily; erections during sleep or when waking up are medically known as nocturnal penile tumescence and colloquially referred to as morning wood. In uncircumcised males, the foreskin begins to automatically retract during erections during puberty.

=== Foreskin retraction ===
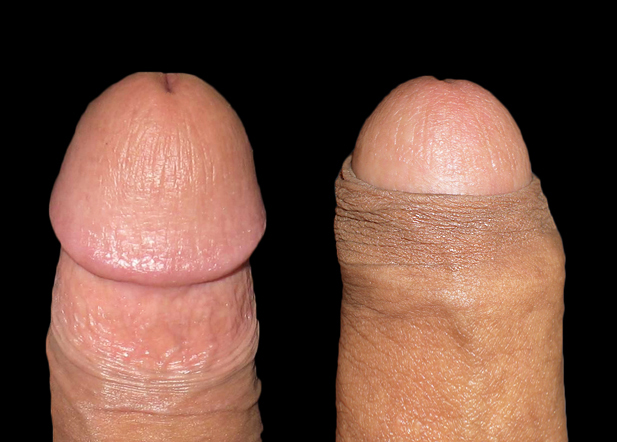
Once the foreskin has naturally separated from the glans, the foreskin can be retracted to reveal the glans and inner foreskin

During the first years of life, the foreskin is fused to the glans; forced retraction can cause pain or microtearing and is thus not recommended. During or prior to the early stages of puberty, the tip and opening of the foreskin widens from accumulation of smegma and periodic erections, causing the adhesive membrane bonding the foreskin to the glans to slowly disintegrate. This process gradually allows for retraction of the foreskin down the shaft of the penis to expose the glans. The reduction of adhesion typically occurs gradually throughout childhood, with younger boys often experiencing adhesions extending to the regions of the glans closer to the urinary meatus; older boys typically experience only isolated thread-like bands. Most boys lose all adhesions between the foreskin and glans by the age of 10-11, but it is not uncommon for adhesions to continue to exist until 14-15.

Retractibility of the foreskin by age group
| Age | No foreskin retraction | Some foreskin retraction | Full foreskin retraction |
|---|---|---|---|
| 6–7 | 8% | 63% | 29% |
| 8–9 | 6% | 58% | 36% |
| 10–11 | 6% | 48% | 46% |
| 12–13 | 3% | 34% | 63% |
| 14–15 | 1% | 13% | 86% |
| 16–17 | 1% | 3% | 96% |

Once a male is able to retract his foreskin, penile hygiene should become an important feature of his routine body care. Smegma, an oily secretion that maintains the moist texture of the foreskin's mucosal surfaces, prevents friction, and helps resolve foreskin adhesions, typically begins to increase in frequency around the ages of 12–13. Gentle washing under the foreskin during shower and maintaining good genital hygiene is sufficient to prevent smegma buildup. Regular washing under the foreskin was found by Krueger and Osborn (1986) to reduce the risk of numerous penile disorders, however Birley et al. (1993) reports excessive washing with soap should be avoided because it dries the oils out of the tissues and can cause non-specific dermatitis.

=== Body and facial hair ===
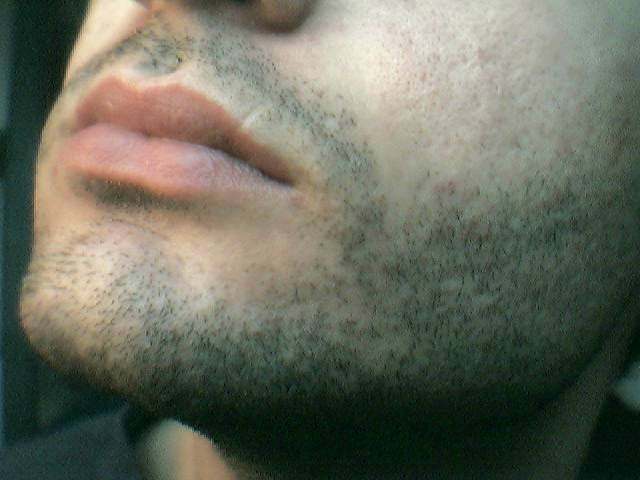
Facial hair of a male

In the months and years following the appearance of pubic hair, other areas of skin that respond to androgens may develop androgenic hair. The emergence of male body hair typically follows the following pattern: underarm (axillary) hair, perianal hair, upper lip hair, sideburn (preauricular) hair, periareolar hair, and the beard area; this specific order varies among individuals. Arm, leg, chest, abdominal, and back hair subsequently become thicker and more volumnous for another 2–4 years after puberty. There is a large range in amount of body hair among adult men and significant differences in the timing and quantity of hair growth between different ethnic groups. Facial hair is often present in late adolescence, but may not appear until significantly later, with some developing it as early as 12 years. Some men do not develop full facial hair for up to 10 years after the completion of puberty.

=== Voice change and Adam's apple ===
Under the influence of androgens, the larynx (or voice box) grows in both sexes. This growth is far more prominent in males, causing the male voice to drop and deepen, sometimes abruptly but rarely "overnight", about one octave, because the longer and thicker vocal folds have a lower fundamental frequency. Before puberty, the larynx of males and females is about equally small.

== Changes in females ==
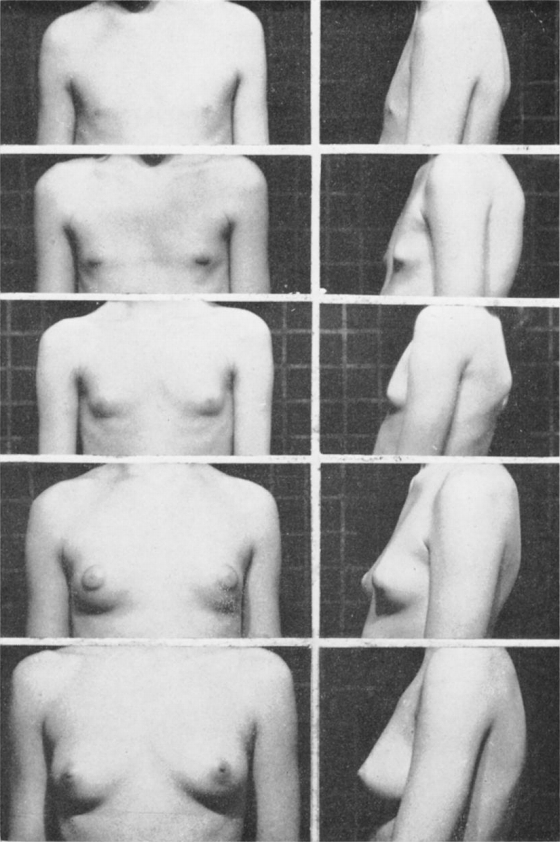
Tanner stages of puberty in females

=== Breast development ===
The first physical sign of puberty in females is usually a firm, tender lump under the center of the areola of one or both breasts, occurring on average at about 10½ years of age. This is referred to as thelarche. By the widely used Tanner staging of puberty, this is stage 2 of breast development (stage 1 is a flat, prepubertal breast). Within 6–12 months, the swelling has clearly begun in both sides, softened, and can be felt and seen extending beyond the edges of the areolae. This is stage 3 of breast development. By another 12 months (stage 4), the breasts are approaching mature size and shape, with areolae and nipples forming a secondary mound. In most young women, this mound disappears into the contour of the mature breast (stage 5), although there is so much variation in sizes and shapes of adult breasts that stages 4 and 5 are not always separately identifiable.

=== Pubic hair ===
Pubic hair is often the second noticeable change in puberty, usually within a few months of thelarche. It is referred to as pubarche. The pubic hairs are usually visible first along the labia. The first few hairs are described as Tanner stage 2. Stage 3 is usually reached within another 6–12 months, when the hairs are too numerous to count and appear on the pubic mound as well. By stage 4, the pubic hairs densely fill the "pubic triangle". Stage 5 refers to spread of pubic hair to the thighs and sometimes as abdominal hair upward towards the navel. In about 15% of females, the earliest pubic hair appears before breast development begins.

=== Vagina, uterus, ovaries ===
Perineal skin keratinizes due to effect of estrogen increasing its resistance to infection. The mucosal surface of the vagina also changes in response to increasing levels of estrogen, becoming thicker and duller pink in color (in contrast to the brighter red of the prepubertal vaginal mucosa). Mucosa changes into a multilayered structure with superficial layer of squamous cells. Estrogen increases glycogen content in vaginal epithelium, which in future plays important part in maintaining vaginal pH. Whitish secretions (physiologic leukorrhea) are a normal effect of estrogen as well. In the two years following thelarche, the uterus, ovaries, and the follicles in the ovaries increase in size.

=== Menstruation and fertility ===
The first menstrual bleeding is referred to as menarche, and typically occurs about two years after thelarche. The average age of menarche is 12½ in the United States. Most American females experience their first period at 11, 12 or 13, but some experience it earlier than their 11th birthday and others after their 14th birthday. In fact, anytime between 8 and 16 is normal. In Canada, the average age of menarche is 12.72, and in the United Kingdom it is 12.9. The time between menstrual periods (menses) is not always regular in the first two years after menarche. Ovulation is necessary for fertility, but may or may not accompany the earliest menses. In postmenarchal females, about 80% of the cycles were anovulatory in the first year after menarche, 50% in the third year and 10% in the sixth year. Initiation of ovulation after menarche is not inevitable. A high proportion of females with continued irregularity in the menstrual cycle several years from menarche will continue to have prolonged irregularity and anovulation, and are at higher risk for reduced fertility.

=== Body shape, fat distribution, and body composition ===
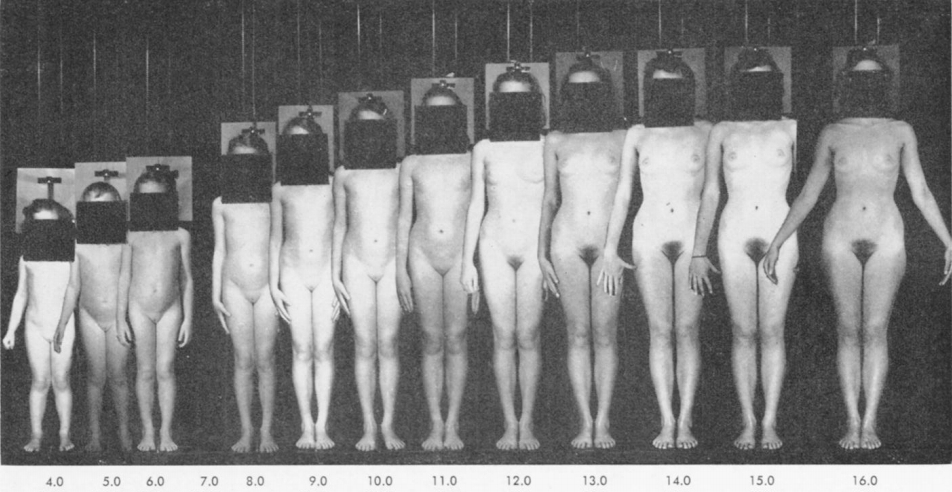
Development of a female from childhood to the end of puberty

During this period, also in response to rising levels of estrogen, the lower half of the pelvis and thus hips widen (providing a larger birth canal). Fat tissue increases to a greater percentage of the body composition than in males, especially in the typical female distribution of breasts, hips, buttocks, thighs, upper arms, and pubis. Progressive differences in fat distribution as well as sex differences in local skeletal growth contribute to the typical female body shape by the end of puberty. On average, at 10 years, females have 6% more body fat than males.

=== Body odor and acne ===
Rising levels of androgens can change the fatty acid composition of perspiration, resulting in a more "adult" body odor. This often precedes thelarche and pubarche by one or more years. Another androgen effect is increased secretion of oil (sebum) from the skin. This change increases the susceptibility to acne, a skin condition that is characteristic of puberty. Acne varies greatly in its severity.

=== Visual and other effects of hormonal changes ===
Testosterone will cause an enlargement of the clitoris and possibly has important effects on the growth and maturation of the vestibular bulbs, corpora cavernosa of the clitoris and urethral sponge.

Changes of the vulva initiated by estradiol as well as its direct effects also appear to influence the functioning of the lower urinary tract.

=== Underarm hair ===
Hair growth develops under the arms, starting out sparse before thickening and darkening over time.

== Variations ==
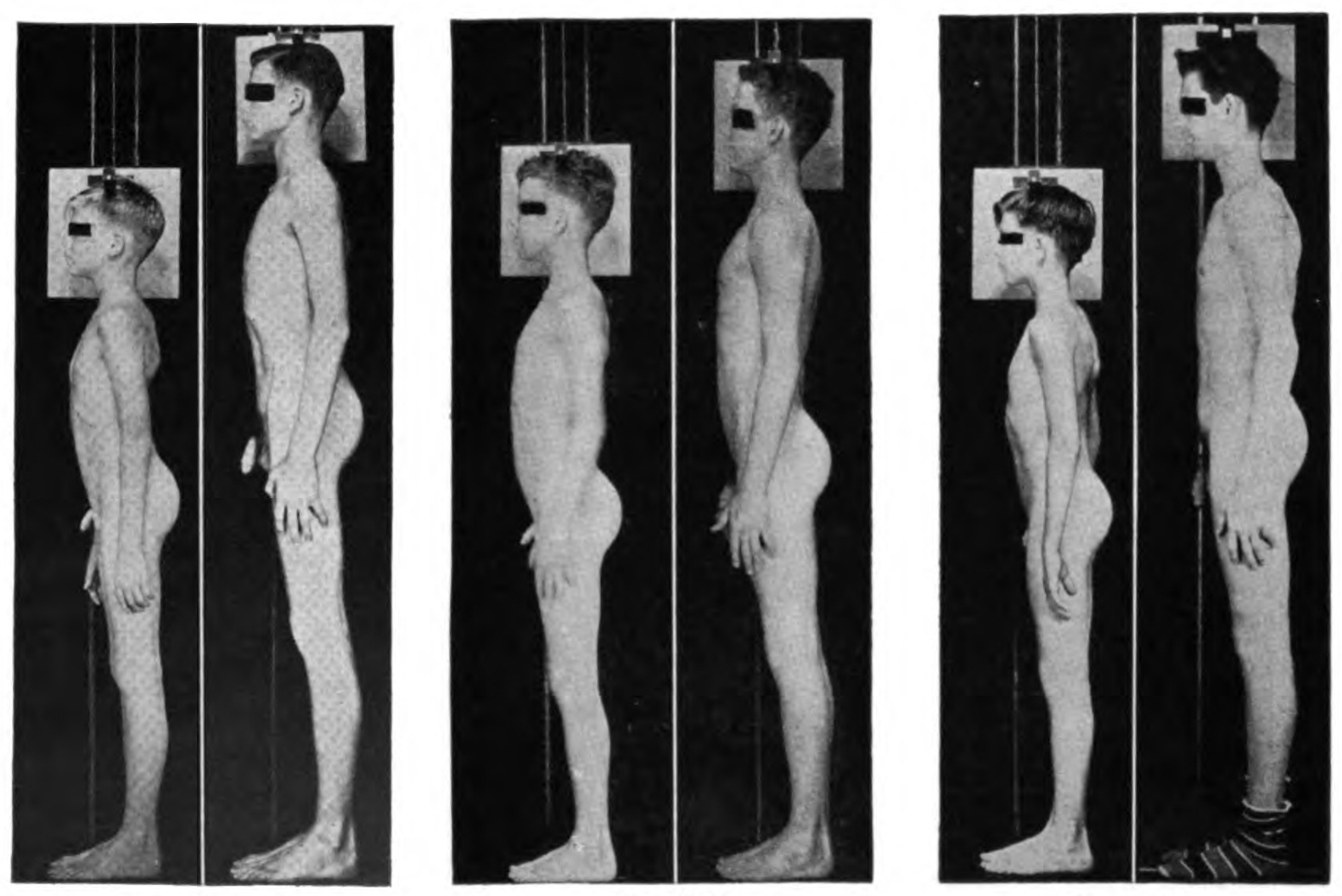
Variations of the initial and final height of three males from 12 years old to the end of their growth spurt

In a general sense, the conclusion of puberty is reproductive maturity. Criteria for defining the conclusion may differ for different purposes: attainment of the ability to reproduce, achievement of maximal adult height, maximal gonadal size, or adult sex hormone levels. Maximal adult height is achieved at an average age of 15 years for an average female and 18 years for an average male. Potential fertility (sometimes termed nubility) usually precedes completion of growth by 1–2 years in females and 3–4 years in males. Stage 5 typically represents maximal gonadal growth and adult hormone levels.

=== Age of onset ===
The definition of the onset of puberty may depend on perspective (e.g., hormonal versus physical) and purpose (establishing population normal standards, clinical care of early or late pubescent individuals, etc.). A common definition for the onset of puberty is physical changes to a person's body. These physical changes are the first visible signs of neural, hormonal, and gonadal function changes.

The age at which puberty begins varies between individuals; usually, puberty begins between 10 and 13 years of age. The age at which puberty begins is affected by both genetic factors and by environmental factors such as nutritional state and social circumstances. An example of social circumstances is the Vandenbergh effect; a juvenile female mouse who has significant interaction with adult male mice will enter puberty earlier than juvenile females who are not socially overexposed to adult males.

The average age at which puberty begins may be affected by ethnicity as well. For example, the average age of menarche in various populations surveyed has ranged from 12 to 18 years. The earliest average onset of puberty is for African-American females and the latest average onset for high altitude subsistence populations in Asia. However, much of the higher age averages reflect nutritional limitations more than genetic differences and can change within a few generations with a substantial change in diet. The median age of menarche for a population may be an index of the proportion of undernourished females in the population, and the width of the spread may reflect unevenness of wealth and food distribution in a population.

Researchers have identified an earlier age of the onset of puberty. However, they have based their conclusions on a comparison of data from 1999 with data from 1969. In the earlier example, the sample population was based on a small sample of white females (200, from Britain). The later study identified as puberty as occurring in 48% of African-American females by age nine, and 12% of white females by that age.

One possible cause of a delay in the onset of puberty past the age 14 in females and 15 in males is Kallmann syndrome, a form of hypogonadotropic hypogonadism (HH). Kallmann syndrome is also associated with a lack of sense of smell (anosmia). Kallmann syndrome and other forms of HH affect both men and women. It is caused by a failure in HPG axis at puberty which results in low or zero gonadotropin (LH and FSH) levels with the subsequent result of a failure to commence or complete puberty, secondary hypogonadism and infertility.

Comparison of two individuals with a vast difference in the age of onset of puberty

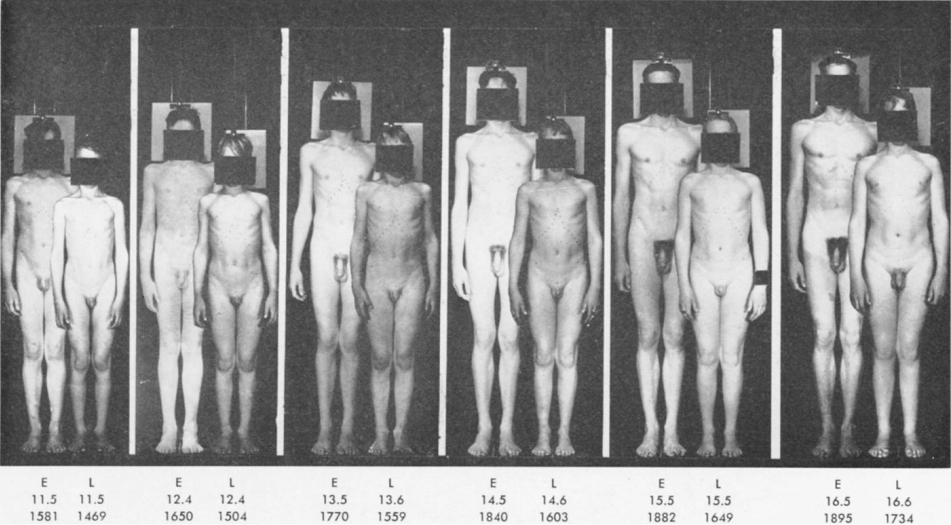
Two males from 11.5 to 16.6 years old

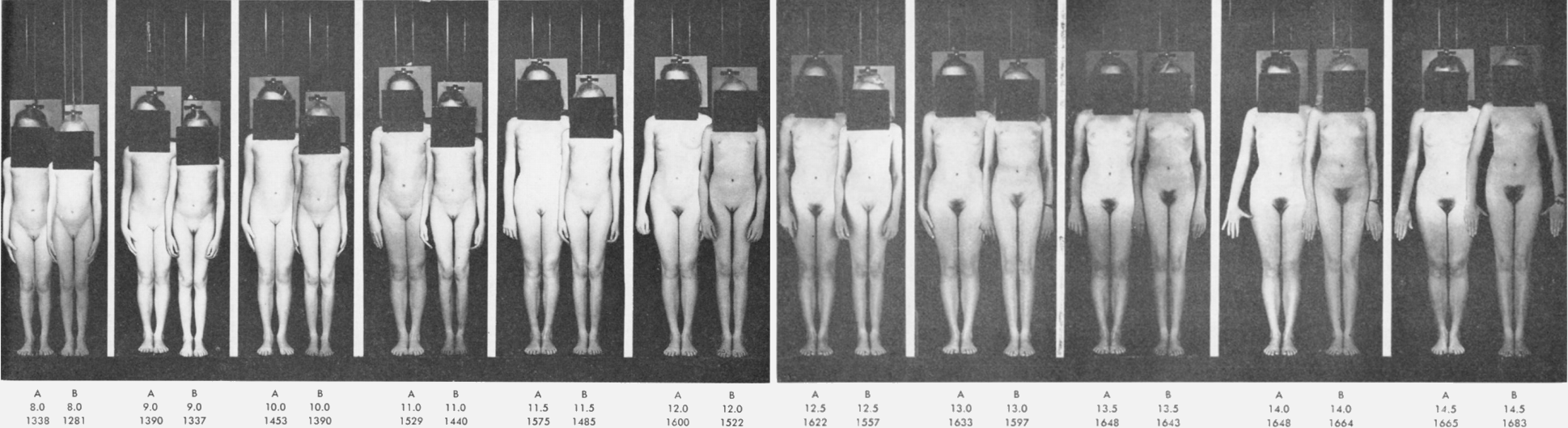
Two females from 8.0 to 14.5 years old

==== Historical shift ====
The average age at which the onset of puberty occurs has dropped significantly since the 1840s.

A 2006 study in Denmark found that puberty, as evidenced by breast development, started at an average age of 9 years and 10 months, a year earlier than when a similar study was done in 1991. Scientists believe the phenomenon could be linked to obesity or exposure to chemicals in the food chain, and is putting females at greater long-term risk of breast cancer.

=== Genetic influence and environmental factors ===
Various studies have found direct genetic effects to account for at least 46% of the variation of timing of puberty in well-nourished populations. The genetic association of timing is strongest between mothers and daughters. The specific genes affecting timing are not yet known. Among the candidates is an androgen receptor gene.

Researchers have hypothesized that early puberty onset may be caused by certain hair care products containing estrogen or placenta, and by certain chemicals, namely phthalates, which are used in many cosmetics, toys, and plastic food containers.

==== Hormones and steroids ====
There is theoretical concern, and animal evidence, that environmental hormones and chemicals may affect aspects of prenatal or postnatal sexual development in humans.

Bisphenol A (BPA) is a chemical used to make plastics, and is frequently used to make baby bottles, water bottles, sports equipment, medical devices, and as a coating in food and beverage cans. Scientists are concerned about BPA's behavioral effects on fetuses, infants, and children at current exposure levels because it can affect the prostate gland, mammary gland, and lead to early puberty in females. BPA mimics and interferes with the action of estrogen—an important reproduction and development regulator. It leaches out of plastic into liquids and foods, and the Centers for Disease Control and Prevention (CDC) found measurable amounts of BPA in the bodies of more than 90 percent of the U.S. population studied. The highest estimated daily intakes of BPA occur in infants and children. Many plastic baby bottles contain BPA, and BPA is more likely to leach out of plastic when its temperature is increased, as when one warms a baby bottle or warms up food in the microwave.

==== Nutritional influence ====
Nutritional factors are the strongest and most obvious environmental factors affecting timing of puberty.

==== Obesity influence and exercise ====
Scientific researchers have linked early obesity with an earlier onset of puberty in females. They have cited obesity as a cause of breast development before nine years and menarche before twelve years. Early puberty in females can be a harbinger of later health problems.

==== Physical and mental illness ====
Mental illnesses occur in puberty. The brain undergoes significant development by hormones which can contribute to mood disorders such as major depressive disorder, bipolar disorder, dysthymia and schizophrenia. Females aged between 15 and 19 make up 40% of anorexia nervosa cases.

== Neurohormonal process ==
The endocrine reproductive system consists of the hypothalamus, the pituitary, the gonads, and the adrenal glands, with input and regulation from many other body systems. True puberty is often termed "central puberty" because it begins as a process of the central nervous system. A simple description of hormonal puberty is as follows:

1. The brain's hypothalamus begins to release pulses of GnRH.
2. Cells in the anterior pituitary respond by secreting LH and FSH into the circulation.
3. The ovaries or testes respond to the rising amounts of LH and FSH by growing and beginning to produce estradiol and testosterone.
4. Rising levels of estradiol and testosterone produce the body changes of female and male puberty.

The onset of this neurohormonal process may precede the first visible body changes by 1–2 years.

=== Components of the endocrine reproductive system ===
The arcuate nucleus of the hypothalamus is the driver of the reproductive system. It has neurons which generate and release pulses of GnRH into the portal venous system of the pituitary gland. The arcuate nucleus is affected and controlled by neuronal input from other areas of the brain and hormonal input from the gonads, adipose tissue and a variety of other systems.

The pituitary gland responds to the pulsed GnRH signals by releasing LH and FSH into the blood of the general circulation, also in a pulsatile pattern.

The gonads (testes and ovaries) respond to rising levels of LH and FSH by producing the steroid sex hormones, testosterone and estrogen.

The adrenal glands are a second source for steroid hormones. Adrenal maturation, termed adrenarche, typically precedes gonadarche in mid-childhood.

=== Major hormones ===
- Neurokinin B (a tachykinin peptide) and kisspeptin (a neuropeptide), both present in KNDy neurons of the hypothalamus, are critical parts of the control system that switches on the release of GnRH at the start of puberty.
- GnRH (gonadotropin-releasing hormone) is a peptide hormone released from the hypothalamus which stimulates gonadotrope cells of the anterior pituitary.
- LH (luteinizing hormone) is a larger protein hormone secreted into the general circulation by gonadotrope cells of the anterior pituitary gland. The main target cells of LH are the Leydig cells of testes and the theca cells of the ovaries. LH secretion changes more dramatically with the initiation of puberty than FSH, as LH levels increase about 25-fold with the onset of puberty, compared with the 2.5-fold increase of FSH.
- FSH (follicle stimulating hormone) is another protein hormone secreted into the general circulation by the gonadotrope cells of the anterior pituitary. The main target cells of FSH are the ovarian follicles and the Sertoli cells and spermatogenic tissue of the testes.
- Testosterone is a steroid hormone produced primarily by the Leydig cells of the testes, and in lesser amounts by the theca cells of the ovaries and the adrenal cortex. Testosterone is the primary mammalian androgen and the "original" anabolic steroid. It acts on androgen receptors in responsive tissue throughout the body.
- Estradiol is a steroid hormone produced by aromatization of testosterone. Estradiol is the principal human estrogen and acts on estrogen receptors throughout the body. The largest amounts of estradiol are produced by the granulosa cells of the ovaries, but lesser amounts are derived from testicular and adrenal testosterone.
- Adrenal androgens are steroids produced by the zona reticulosa of the adrenal cortex in both sexes. The major adrenal androgens are dehydroepiandrosterone, androstenedione (which are precursors of testosterone), and dehydroepiandrosterone sulfate which is present in large amounts in the blood. Adrenal androgens contribute to the androgenic events of early puberty in females.
- IGF1 (insulin-like growth factor 1) rises substantially during puberty in response to rising levels of growth hormone and may be the principal mediator of the pubertal growth spurt.
- Leptin is a protein hormone produced by adipose tissue. Its primary target organ is the hypothalamus. The leptin level seems to provide the brain a rough indicator of adipose mass for purposes of regulation of appetite and energy metabolism. It also plays a permissive role in female puberty, which usually will not proceed until an adequate body mass has been achieved.

=== Endocrine perspective ===
The endocrine reproductive system becomes functional by the end of the first trimester of fetal life. The testes and ovaries become briefly inactive around the time of birth but resume hormonal activity until several months after birth, when incompletely understood mechanisms in the brain begin to suppress the activity of the arcuate nucleus. This has been referred to as maturation of the prepubertal "gonadostat", which becomes sensitive to negative feedback by sex steroids. The period of hormonal activity until several months after birth, followed by suppression of activity, may correspond to the period of infant sexuality, followed by a latency stage, which Sigmund Freud described.

Neurons of the arcuate nucleus secrete gonadotropin releasing hormone (GnRH) into the blood of the pituitary portal system. An American physiologist, Ernst Knobil, found that the GnRH signals from the hypothalamus induce pulsed secretion of LH (and to a lesser degree, FSH) at roughly 1–2 hour intervals. The LH pulses are the consequence of pulsatile GnRH secretion by the arcuate nucleus that, in turn, is the result of an oscillator or signal generator in the central nervous system ("GnRH pulse generator"). In the years preceding physical puberty, Robert M. Boyar discovered that the gonadotropin pulses occur only during sleep, but as puberty progresses they can be detected during the day. By the end of puberty, there is little day-night difference in the amplitude and frequency of gonadotropin pulses.

Some investigators have attributed the onset of puberty to a resonance of oscillators in the brain. By this mechanism, the gonadotropin pulses that occur primarily at night just before puberty represent beats.

An array of "autoamplification processes" increases the production of all of the pubertal hormones of the hypothalamus, pituitary, and gonads.

| Hormone | Units | Prepubertal Stage 1 | Stage 2 | Stage 3 | Stage 4 | Stage 5 | |
| Hormone | Units | Prepubertal Stage 1 | Stage 2 | Stage 3 | Stage 4 | Phase | |
|---|---|---|---|---|---|---|---|
| LH | mIU/mL | 2.7 (<1.0–5.5) | 4.2 (<1.0–9.0) | 6.7 (<1.0–14.6) | 7.7 (2.8–15.0) | Follicular; Luteal | 7.6 (3–18); 6.6 (3–18) |
| LH | U/L | <0.1 (<0.1–0.2) | 0.7 (<0.1–2.8) | 2.1 (<0.1–6.8) | 3.6 (0.9–8.1) | Follicular; Luteal | 3.8 (1.6–8.1); 3.5 (1.5–8.0) |
| FSH | mIU/mL | 4.0 (<1–5) | 4.6 (<1.0–7.2) | 6.8 (3.3–10.5) | 7.4 (3.3–10.5) | Follicular; Luteal | 10.3 (6–15); 6.0 (3.4–8.6) |
| FSH | U/L | 2.1 (<0.5–5.4) | 3.5 (<0.5–6.6) | 4.9 (0.7–9.0) | 6.2 (1.1–11.3) | Follicular; Luteal | 6.6 (1.9–10.8); 5.4 (1.8–10.5) |
| Estradiol | pg/mL | 9 (<9–20) | 15 (<9–30) | 27 (<9–60) | 55 (16–85) | Follicular; Luteal | 50 (30–100); 130 (70–300) |
| Estrone | pg/mL | 13 (<9–23) | 18 (10–37) | 26 (17–58) | 36 (23–69) | Follicular; Luteal | 44 (30–89); 75 (39–160) |
| Progesterone | ng/dL | 22 (<10–32) | 30 (10–51) | 36 (10–75) | 175 (<10–2500) | Follicular; Luteal | 35 (13–75) (200–2500) |
| Hydroxyprogesterone | ng/dL | 33 (<10–84) | 52 (10–98) | 75 (10–185) | 97 (17–235) | Follicular; Luteal | 48 (12–90); 178 (35–290) |
| DHEA-S | μg/dL | 49^{a} (20–95); 106^{b} (40–200) | 129 (60–240) | 155 (85–290) | 195 (106–320) | – | 220 (118–320) |
| DHEA | ng/dL | 35^{a} (<10–70); 127^{b} (72–180) | 297 (150–540) | 328 (190–620) | 394 (240–768) | – | 538 (215–855) |
| Androstenedione | ng/dL | 26 (<10–50) | 77 (40–112) | 126 (55–190) | 147 (70–245) | – | 172 (74–284) |
| Testosterone | ng/dL | 10 (<10–22) | 18 (<10–29) | 26 (<10–40) | 38 (24–62) | – | 40 (27–70) |
Notes: Values are mean plasma levels, with ranges in parentheses. ^{a} = Pre-adrenarche. ^{b} = Post-adrenarche. (Adrenarche, or increased adrenal androgen section, occurs as a separate event and can precede puberty onset by 1 to 2 years.) Sources:

== Stages ==
- adrenarche (approximately ages 6–8)
- gonadarche (approximately age 10½ in females and age 11½ in males)
- thelarche (approximately age 10½ in females)
- pubarche (approximately age 11 in females and age 12 in males)
- menarche (approximately age 12½ in females)
- spermarche (approximately age 13 in males)

== See also ==
- Adolescent sexuality
- Child sexuality
- Andropause
- Menopause
- Delayed puberty
- Eunuch
- Hebephilia
- Kallmann syndrome
- Precocious puberty
- Puberphonia
- Puberty blocker
- Seclusion of girls at puberty
- Secondary sex characteristic

== Sources ==
- Gordon CM, Laufer MR (2005). "Chapter 4: Physiology of puberty". In Emans SJ, Goldstein DP, Laufer MR (eds.). Pediatric and Adolescent Gynecology (5th ed.). Philadelphia: Lippincott Williams & Wilkins. pp. 120–155. ISBN 978-0-7817-4493-5.
- Gungor N, Arslanian SA (2002). "Chapter 21: Nutritional disorders: integration of energy metabolism and its disorders in childhood". In Sperling MA (ed.). Pediatric Endocrinology (2nd ed.). Philadelphia: Saunders. pp. 689–724. ISBN 978-0-7216-9539-6.
- Jorgensen M, Keiding N, Skakkebaek NE (1991). "Estimation of Spermarche from Longitudinal Spermaturia Data". Biometrics. 47 (1): 177–193. doi:10.2307/2532505. JSTOR 2532505. PMID 2049498.
- Marshall WA, Tanner JM (1986). "Chapter 8: Puberty". In Falkner F, Tanner JM (eds.). Human Growth: A Comprehensive Treatise (2nd ed.). New York: Plenum Press. pp. 171–209. ISBN 978-0-306-41952-2.
- Rosenfield RL (2002). "Chapter 16: Female puberty and its disorders". In Sperling, MA (ed.). Pediatric Endocrinology (2nd ed.). Philadelphia: Saunders. pp. 455–518. ISBN 978-0-7216-9539-6.
- Styne DM (2002). "Chapter 18: The testes: disorders of sexual differentiation and puberty in the male". In Sperling, MA (ed.). Pediatric Endocrinology (2nd ed.). Philadelphia: Saunders. pp. 565–628. ISBN 978-0-7216-9539-6.
