= Tanner scale =

Physical development scale of children, adolescents, and adults

- Synonyms: Tanner stages 4
- Purpose: Defines physical measurements of development

The Tanner scale (also known as the Tanner stages or sexual maturity rating (SMR)) is a scale of physical development as pre-pubescent children transition into adolescence, and then adulthood. The scale defines physical measurements of development based on external primary and secondary sex characteristics, such as the size of the breasts, length of the penis, volume of the testes, and growth of pubic hair. This scale was first quantified in 1969 by James Tanner, a British pediatrician, after a two-decade study following the physical changes in girls undergoing puberty.

Tanner scale

Illustration for males

Illustration for females

Due to natural variation, individuals pass through the Tanner stages at different rates, depending in particular on the timing of puberty. Among researchers who study puberty, the Tanner scale is commonly considered the "gold standard" for assessing pubertal status when it is conducted by a trained medical examiner. In HIV treatment, the Tanner scale is used to determine which regimen to follow for pediatric or adolescent patients on antiretroviral therapy (adult, adolescent, or pediatric guidelines). The Tanner scale has also been used in forensics to determine aging, but its usage has decreased due to lack of reliability.

== Stages ==
Adapted from Adolescent Health Care: A Practical Guide by Lawrence Neinstein.

=== Genitals (male) ===
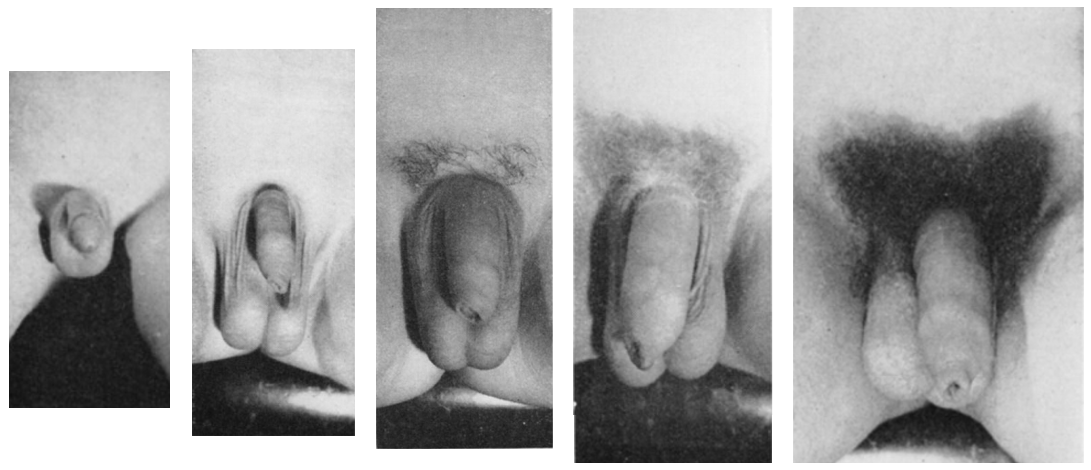
Photos of the Tanner scale for males

Tanner I
testicular volume less than 1.5 ml; small penis (prepubertal)
Tanner II
testicular volume between 1.6 and 6 ml; skin on scrotum thins, reddens and enlarges; penis length unchanged
Tanner III
testicular volume between 6 and 12 ml; scrotum enlarges further; penis begins to lengthen
Tanner IV
testicular volume between 12 and 20 ml; scrotum becomes larger and darkens; penis further increases in length and starts to increase in breadth
Tanner V
testicular volume at least 20 ml; adult scrotum and penis

=== Breasts (female) ===
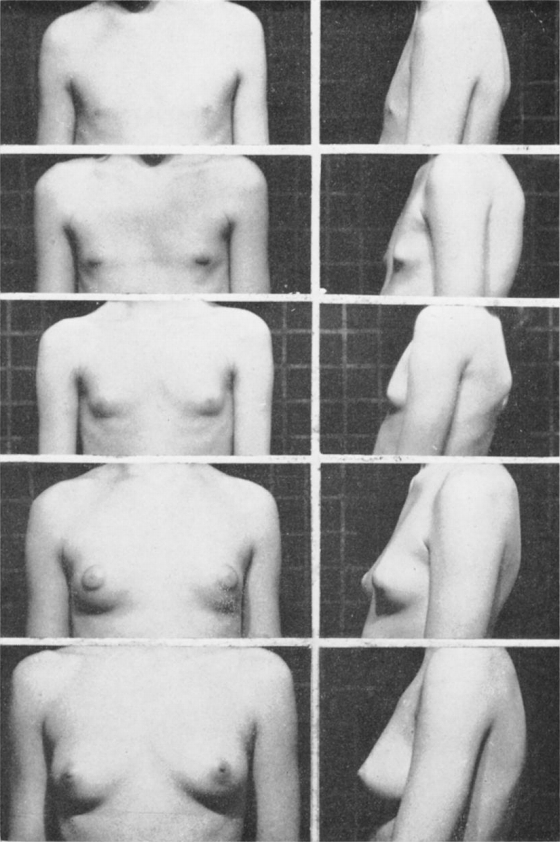
Photos of the Tanner scale for females

Tanner I
no glandular tissue: areola follows the skin contours of the chest (prepubertal)
Tanner II
breast bud forms, with small area of surrounding glandular tissue; areola begins to widen
Tanner III
breast begins to become more elevated, and extends beyond the borders of the areola, which continues to widen but remains in contour with surrounding breast
Tanner IV
increased breast sizing and elevation; areola and papilla form a secondary mound projecting from the contour of the surrounding breast
Tanner V
breast reaches final adult size; areola returns to contour of the surrounding breast, with a projecting central papilla

=== Pubic hair (both male and female) ===
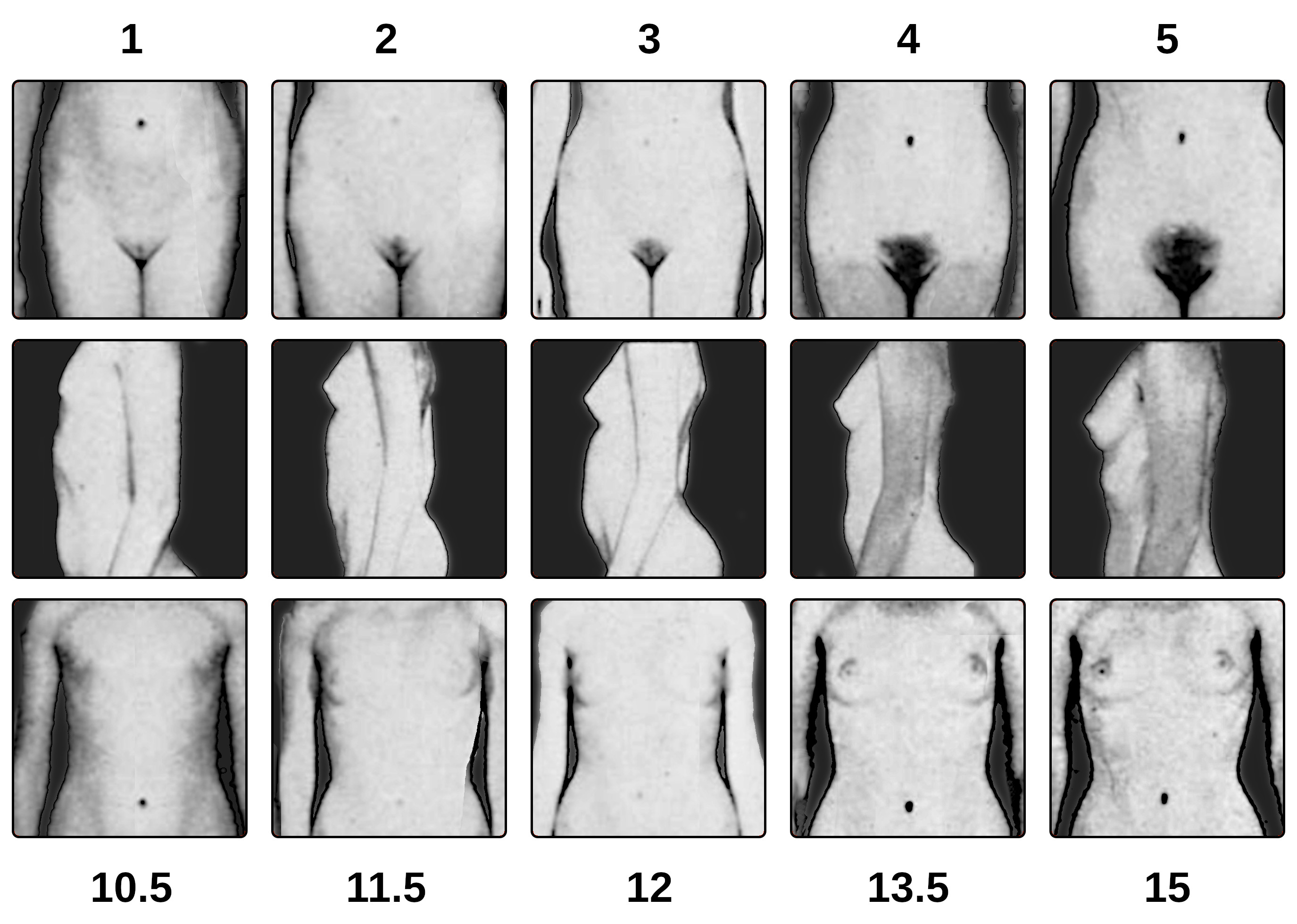
The five stages of pubic hair and breast growth, on a female subject

Tanner I
no pubic hair at all (prepubertal)
Tanner II
small amount of long, downy hair with slight pigmentation at the base of the penis and scrotum (males) or on the labia majora (females)
Tanner III
hair becomes more coarse and curly, and begins to extend laterally
Tanner IV
adult-like hair quality, extending across pubis but sparing medial thighs
Tanner V
hair extends to medial surface of the thighs

== Height ==
During Tanner V, females stop growing and reach their adult height. Usually, this happens in their mid teens at 14 or 15 years for females.

Males also stop growing and reach their adult height during Tanner V; usually this happens at 16 to 17 years, but can be later, even into the early 20s.

== Historical data ==
In 1970 Britain, boys reached the last Tanner stage, the postpubertal stage, on average at the age of 14.9 years and girls around the age of 14 depending on social class and the particular study. In the nearly fifty years since those studies, the ages at which children are beginning puberty has only declined: (as of 2018) "The age of puberty, especially female puberty, has been decreasing in western cultures for decades now [...] for example, at the turn of the 20th century, the average age for an American girl to get her period was 16 or 17. Today, that number has decreased to 12 or 13 years."

== Criticism ==
The scale has been criticized by the pornography industry for its potential to lead to false child pornography convictions, such as in the case of pornographic actress Lupe Fuentes where in 2009 United States federal authorities used it to assert that she was not an adult despite her age. Fuentes personally appeared at the trial and provided documentation that showed that the DVDs in question were legally produced.

Tanner, the author of the classification system, has argued that age classification using the stages of the scale misrepresents the intended use. Tanner stages do not match with chronological age, but rather maturity stages and thus are not diagnostic for age estimation.

== See also ==
- Delayed puberty
- Gonadarche
- Precocious puberty
- Pubarche
- Vellus hair
