= List of youth-related terms =

List of youth-related terms below are divided into unisex, male and female terms. During a child's growth and development from newborn to adulthood, various terminology can be applicable.

== Unisex terms ==
- Junior = 'younger', antonym of senior, occurs in titles as 'lower grade', in terms of service years (not age) or even merely hierarchical, on criteria regardless of experience; equivalent is puisne.
- Infant, originally 'child too young to speak', evolved to infantryman 'foot soldier' (also footman) and, in Iberian language, to the princely style infante.
- minor relates to an age limit (a remnant may be the age of sexual consent) or even a legal system in which women were never fully emancipated in the eyes of the law, and so passed from the dominion of their fathers to that of their husbands.
- Tweens or preteens are defined as in-between being a child and a teen.
- Teenager, a person between the ages of 13 to 19 years.

== Male terms ==
- bachelor evolved in the 14th century from "knight in training" (possibly by the staff to train for sword fight) to "junior member of a guild or university" and by 1386 to "unmarried man"
- cadet
- garçon, the French for boy, a form of the archaic or non-standard gars (meaning (usually young) man), was adopted in various languages (in English reported since 1788) for a (food or drinks) waiter
- groom (not the etymologically unrelated homophone meaning "husband-to-be") originally meant "young male", possibly related to "gromet" (servant, especially ship's boy), and only in the 1667 was specifically used for a stable man or - boy (even the last not necessarily a youth).
- knave (Old English cnafa or cnapa, cognate with Dutch knaap, German Knabe, and Knappe, "boy"), originally "a male child", "a boy" (Chaucer, Canterbury Tales: Clerks Tale, I. 388). Like Latin puer, the word was early used as a name for any boy or lad employed as a servant, and so of male servants in general (Chaucer: Pardoners Tale, 1. 204), and especially a journeyman. The current use of the word "knave" for "a man who is dishonest and crafty, a rogue", was however an early usage, and is found in Layamon (c. 1205). In playing-cards the lowest court card of each suit, the jack, representing a medieval servant, is still often called the knave.
- Lad, or in the Scottish diminutive form laddie (recorded since 1546): known since c.1300 as ladde "foot soldier," also "young male servant" (attested as a surname from c.1100), possibly from a Scandinavian language (cf. Norwegian -ladd, in compounds for "young man"), perhaps originally a plural of the pp. of lead (v.), thus "one who is led" (by a lord); present meaning "boy, youth, young man" attested from c.1440; in Northern England, and particularly in the county of Lancashire, males of all ages jokingly refer to themselves as being a Lancashire "lad". Lass(i.e.) is the female counterpart.
- oac, the Old Irish for "youths", later came to mean "soldier", as in Gallóglaigh (gallowglass)
- Pal, term often used by older males to describe those considered to be younger.
- Son, literally a parent's male child, has been used for a male 'junior' which could be called a boy, specifically in respect to a senior, especially a 'father figure', as a man often calls a (significantly younger) boy who addresses him as Sir, or a clergyman (still commonly addressed as father) used to address male laymen, especially those in his pastoral care; the diminutive sonny is reserved for young boys
- The terms squire and esquire, both from Old French esquier (modern French écuyer), itself from Latin scutarius "shield bearer", originally entered English as a boy in attendance to a knight (like page), but were socially promoted and lost their age-connotation.
- The term swain, from Old Norse sveinn, originally meant young man or servant, even as a Norwegian court title) entered English c.1150 as "young man attendant upon a knight" i.e. squire, or junior rank, as in boatswain and coxswain, but now usually means a boyfriend (since 1585) or a country lad (farm laborer since 1579; especially a young shepherd, cognate with Old English swan 'swineherd').
- The term vassal stems from an Old Celtic root *wasso- "young man, squire" (e.g. Welsh gwas "youth, servant," Breton goaz "servant, vassal, man," Irish foss "servant").
- The term valet and its variant "varlet" also derive from "vassal" (above) and apply to male servants, sometimes specifically boys.
- wag, now meaning "person fond of making jokes," is recorded in English since 1553; it derives from the verb to wag (i.e. to make a swinging movement), perhaps in this context as a shortening of waghalter "gallows bird," a person destined to swing in a noose or halter, soon applied humorously to mischievous children (the same notion remains in the Dutch expression voor galg en rad opgroeien), later to all young men without the naughty connotation, finally to witty persons
- the term youth itself is not uncommonly used specifically for a young male, notably between puberty and maturity

== Female terms ==
- Babe
- Bachelorette
- Chick
- Damsel
- Gal
- Girl
- Lass
- Lassie
- Maid
- Maiden
- Tomboy

Preceded by Preadolescence	Stages of human development Adolescence	Succeeded by Young adult
