= Spermarche =

Beginning of sperm production in male puberty

Spermarche, also known as semenarche, is the time at which a male experiences his first ejaculation. It is considered to be the male counterpart of menarche in females. Depending on upbringing, cultural differences, and prior sexual knowledge, males may have different reactions to spermarche, ranging from fear to excitement. Spermarche is one of the first events in the life of a male leading to sexual maturity. It occurs at the time when the secondary sex characteristics are just beginning to develop. Researchers have had difficulty determining the onset of spermarche because it is reliant on self-reporting. Other methods to determine it have included the examination of urine samples to determine the presence of spermatozoa. The presence of sperm in urine is referred to as spermaturia.

== Age of occurrence ==
Research on the subject has varied for the reasons stated above, as well as changes in the average age of pubescence, which has been decreasing at an average rate of three months a decade. Research from 2010 indicated that the average age for spermarche in the U.S. was 12–16. In 2015, researchers in China determined that the average age for spermarche in China was 14. Historical data from countries including Nigeria and the United States also suggest 14 as an average age.

=== As a function of precocious puberty ===
Puberty onset before the age of 9 in males is considered medically abnormal, and is defined as precocious puberty; research on both organic and ideopathic precocious puberty in males has described puberty onset as early as nine months old. As semenarche has a wide range of onset within puberty (with some research indicating spermatogenesis in some cases in early pubertal development) it is difficult to determine a minimum age for spermarche should one exist. Research on the subject, though lacking, has described ejaculation in males as young as six years old.

The record for the youngest ever confirmed father has not been definitively published. In 1910, a 9-year-old boy in China was reported to have fathered a child with an 8-year-old girl (these are also considered the youngest recorded parents in combined age).

== Context ==
Various studies have examined the circumstances in which the first ejaculation occurred. Most commonly this occurred via a nocturnal emission, with a significant number experiencing semenarche via masturbation, which is very common at that stage. Less commonly, the first ejaculation occurred during sexual intercourse with a partner.

== See also ==
- Puberty
- Adrenarche
- Gonadarche
- Nocturnal emission
- Thelarche
- Pubarche
- Menarche
