= Thelarche =

Beginning of development of the breasts in the female

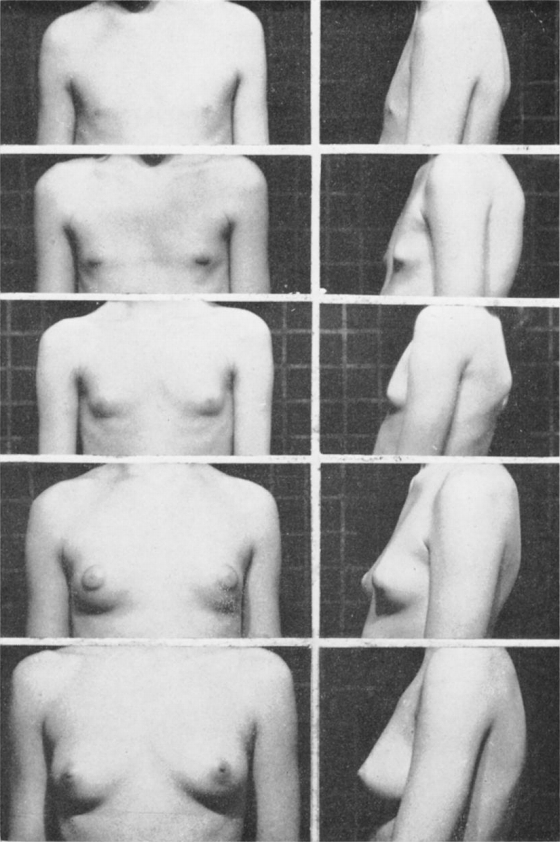
Tanner scale of female breast development

Thelarche, also known as breast budding, is the onset of secondary breast development, often representing the beginning of pubertal development. It is the stage at which male and female breasts differentiate due to variance in hormone levels; however, some males have a condition in which they develop breasts, which is called gynecomastia. Thelarche typically occurs between the ages of 8 and 13 years with significant variation between individuals. However, the initial growth of breast tissue occurs during fetal development. It is usually the first sign of puberty in females (less commonly, it can be the second sign, after pubarche).

Usually, females experience menarche about two years after thelarche has begun, with complete breast development from thelarche to adult breasts, taking between 2 and 4 years but can last up to age 18. Moreover, puberty is considered delayed if breast development does not start at age 13 or if a female has not had her first period (menarche) within three years of thelarche. Additionally, secondary breast development occurring before the age of 7 years could be a sign of premature thelarche or precocious puberty. Of note, for some girls, thelarche will occur, with subsequent regression of breast development, and then months or years later, normal breast growth will commence again accompanied by normal pubertal changes; this is termed transient thelarche.

Pubertal changes, including breast development, are assessed using the Tanner scale (Sexual Maturity Rating Scale) where stage 1 is before, stage 2 is the breast budding or thelarche stage, stages 3 and 4 are continual breast growth and areolar development, and stage 5 signifies completion of development. This system does not use breast size but instead examines the shape of breasts, nipples, and areolae to determine the progression of growth.

Various hormones interact and result in the changes seen during thelarche. The growth and accumulation of adipose tissue in the breasts are induced by estrogen, while the development of mammary glands and areolae are caused by progesterone; both estrogen and progesterone are produced by ovaries. Due to change in hormone levels, young breasts are likely to develop asymmetrically, and in many cases, adult breasts will remain unequal in size or shape.

== Epidemiology and trends ==
The age of thelarche has been decreasing in the past few decades. Between 1973 and 2013, the age of thelarche decreased at a rate of 0.24 years per decade. Other contemporary trends that may be contributing to this change in the onset of thelarche include increasing body mass index (BMI), changes in pubertal timing, and environmental exposures. Studies also indicate associations between the average age of thelarche and race. The average age of thelarche for African American females in the United States is between 8.9 and 9.5 years, the average for Caucasians is 10–10.4 years, and the average age of thelarche for Hispanic females is approximately 9.8 years. Additionally, in African American and Mexican American girls, breast development may occur earlier than in other ethnic cohorts and can be normal in the 7th year of age. Due to the decreasing age of thelarche over time, there is discussion of adjusting the cutoff for early thelarche to 7 years old for white females and six years old for black females.

Furthermore, there have been associations between obesity, chemical contaminants, and the earlier average age of thelarche. Studies have shown that obesity is associated with an earlier average age of thelarche. Moreover, the prevalence of premature thelarche has been increasing over the past several years which many attribute to pesticides. Experimental data indicate the impact of chemical contaminants in gestation and puberty, with the chemical such as phthalates having a high association with premature thelarche frequency.

== Premature thelarche ==
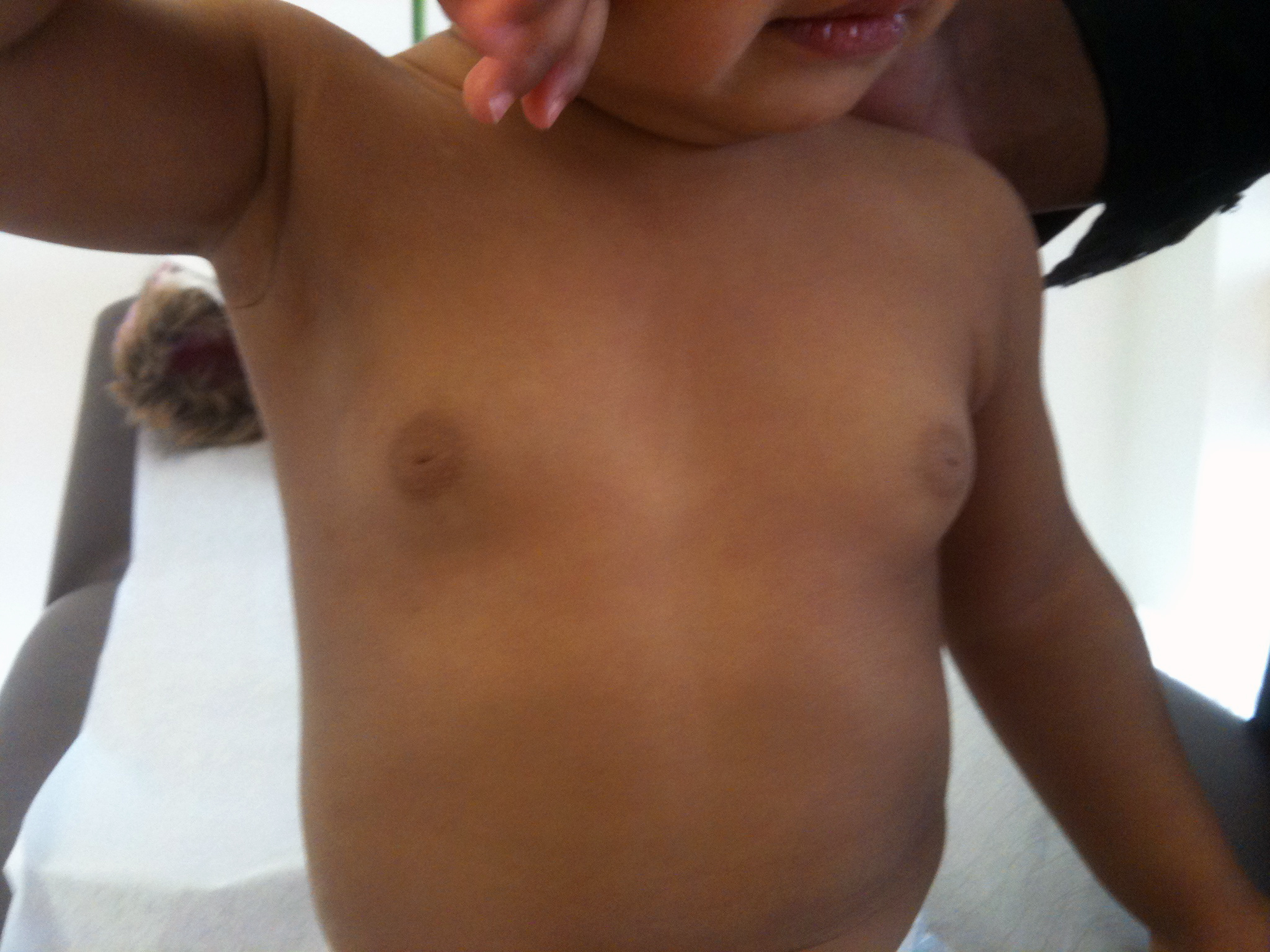
Infant with premature thelarche

Premature thelarche is a benign condition in which a young female has breast development before age eight without any accompanied pubertal changes. Individuals undergoing isolated premature thelarche do not experience menstruation, pubic hair growth (pubarche), or the bone growth characteristic of puberty. Initial breast development can be bilateral or unilateral and usually begins with a firm, disc-like area of tissue under the areola, which can be mistaken for a mass but is almost always a normal physiologic process. The breast is often tender, and palpation is sometimes painful, but breast discharge is absent. Usually, the breasts do not develop past stage 3 on the Tanner Scale, hence maintaining adolescent nipples. Moreover, in 90% of patients with isolated premature thelarche, breast enlargement will resolve six months to 6 years after diagnosis.

The most common age for females to develop isolated premature thelarche is between 0 and 2 years, with a prevalence rate between 2.2 and 4.7 percent of all female infants. The breasts of these females typically exhibit alternating progression and regression patterns of growth in 6-week intervals, often completely decreasing in size within 1.5 years. Due to the benign nature of the condition and the tendency to self-resolve, premature thelarche does not require treatment. However, premature thelarche should be evaluated to rule out additional causes, such as hypothyroidism or precocious puberty, especially if other symptoms are present. Such evaluations will typically involve serial examinations and radiographs.

== Precocious puberty ==
Precocious puberty is a condition where children undergo puberty before seven or eight years. Precocious puberty differs from premature thelarche in that the individual experiences additional aspects of puberty, including menarche, adrenarche, pubarche, vaginal discharge, and bone growth, while the sole presence of early thelarche identifies premature thelarche. Though premature thelarche and precocious puberty are distinct conditions, there is some overlap; an estimated 14 to 18 percent of females who exhibit premature thelarche will additionally develop precocious puberty. Precocious puberty can be identified using a pelvic ultrasound to assess the size of ovaries and uterus relative to the individual's age. Other methods of diagnosis consist of blood tests to determine hormone levels and simple physician assessments with follow-up appointments to track the progression of development.

== Thelarche variant ==
The thelarche variant, also named exaggerated thelarche, is an intermediate condition between premature thelarche and precocious puberty. This condition resembles premature thelarche without the cyclic waxing and waning of breast growth. Pubic hair growth (pubarche) and advanced bone growth are often present in the thelarche variant. Yet, this growth does not result in complete sexual maturity as occurs with precocious puberty.

== See also ==
- Puberty
- Adrenarche
- Gonadarche
- Pubarche
- Menarche
- Spermarche
- Gynecomastia
