= Premature thelarche =

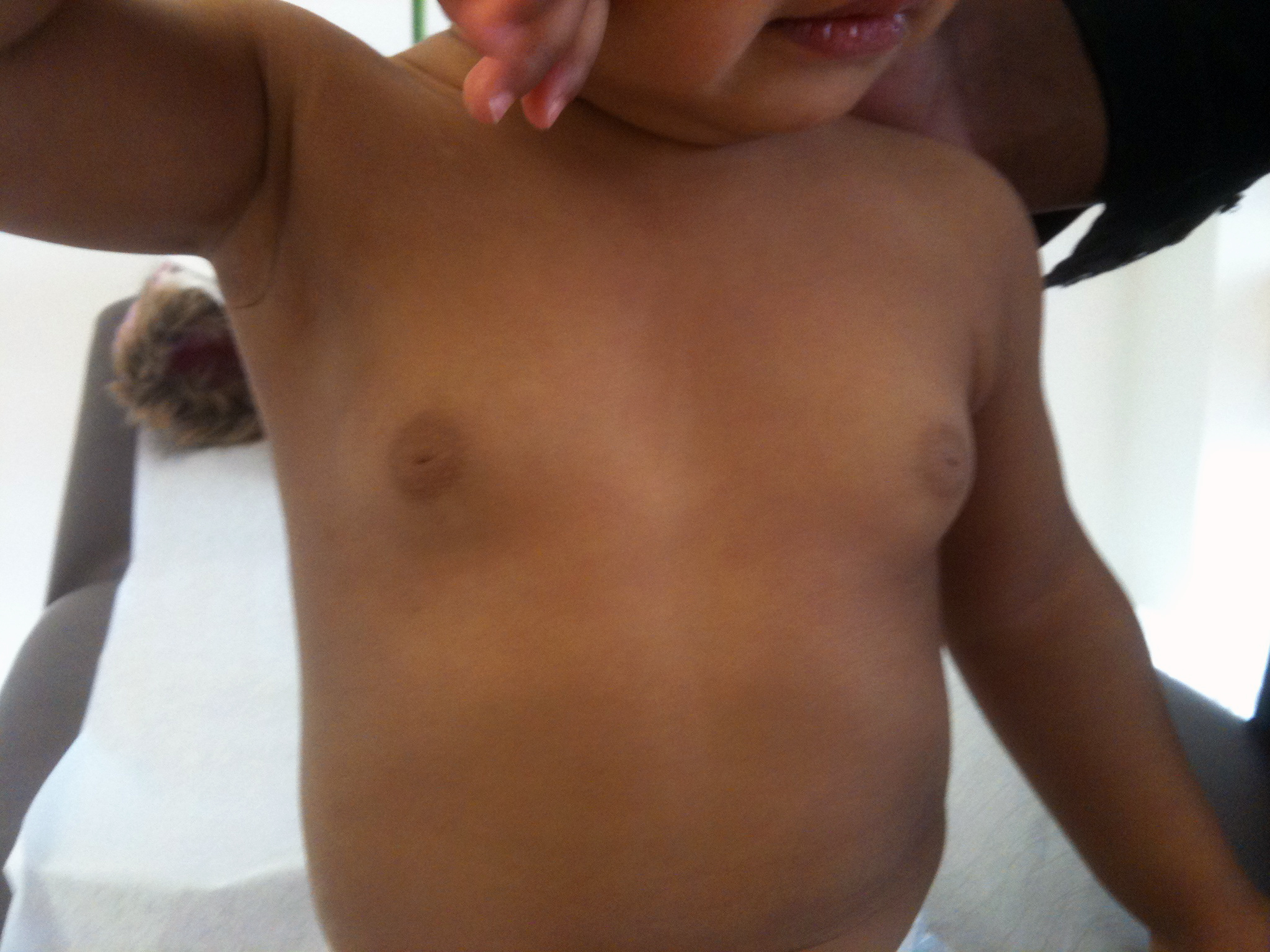
- Infant with premature thelarche
- Specialty: Gynecology, endocrinology

Premature thelarche (PT) is a medical condition, characterised by isolated breast development in female infants. It occurs in females younger than 8 years, with the highest occurrence before the age of 2. PT is rare, occurring in 2.2-4.7% of females aged 0 to 2 years old. The exact cause of the condition is still unknown, but it has been linked to a variety of genetic, dietary and physiological factors.

PT is a form of Incomplete Precocious Puberty (IPP). IPP is the presence of a secondary sex characteristic in an infant, without a change in their sex hormone levels. Central Precocious Puberty (CPP) is a more severe condition than IPP. CPP is the presentation of secondary sex characteristics, with a change in sex hormones due to alteration of the hypothalamic-pituitary-gonadal (HPG) axis. CPP is an aggressive endocrine disorder with harmful developmental consequences for the patient. At the presentation of PT, diagnostics are used to ensure it is not early stage CPP. CPP can be differentiated from PT through biochemical testing, ultrasounds and ongoing observation. There is no treatment for PT but regular observation is important to ensure it does not progress to CPP. CPP diagnosis is important as treatment is necessary.

== Symptoms and signs ==
Premature thelarche is breast hypertrophy before puberty. This form of hypertrophy is an increase in breast tissue. PT occurs in pre-pubescent females, under the age of 8, having a peak occurrence in the first two years of life. The breast development is usually bi-lateral: both breasts show development. In some cases development may be unilateral: one breast develops.

=== Patterns of PT ===
There are four patterns of PT development. Most patients have hypertrophy followed by complete loss of the excess breast tissue (51% of cases) or loss of most excess tissue, but some remains until puberty (36% of cases). Less commonly patients have ongoing patterns of thelarche: 9.7% suffer from a cyclic pattern where the size of the breast tissue varies over time, and 3.2% experience continual increase in tissue size.

=== Associated Symptoms ===
The main symptom of PT is enlarged breast tissue in infants. estrogen's role in PT, also leads to increased bone age and growth in some cases. In PT these secondary symptoms are minimal: bone age only varies from actual age by a few months and growth velocity only slightly varies from the norm. Diagnostic tests will distinguish these PT secondary symptoms from the more severe bone aging and growth occurring in early CPP.

== Pathophysiology ==
The direct pathophysiology behind PT is still unknown, but there are many postulated causes.

=== Estrogen ===
PT is linked to increased sensitivity of the breast tissue to estradiol, an estrogen derivative, in certain prepubertal individuals. Sporadic estrogen or estradiol production in the adrenal glands, follicles or ovarian cysts is also linked to the condition.

=== Follicle stimulating hormone ===
Follicle Stimulating Hormone (FSH) is secreted from the anterior pituitary. FSH plays a key role in development, growth and puberty, thus it is suspected to play a role in PT. Gondotropin-releasing hormone (GnRH) stimulation testing in some patients with PT has shown a dominant response from FSH. This response is linked to active mutations in the FSH receptor and Gs-a subunit in PT. Genetic investigation indicated these mutations only account for few cases of premature PT. PT may also be caused by transient partial activation of the HPG axis. Partial activation would release a surplus of FSH from the anterior pituitary without further disruption of the HPG axis.

=== Other causes ===
The consumption or exposure to certain endocrine disrupters have also been linked to PT.

== CPP and PT ==
PT is the benign growth of breasts in infants, while CPP is a condition that involves the frequent activation of the HPG axis in patients. PT does not require treatment, as the condition is limited to enlarged breast tissue that usually subsides with time. CPP is associated with a wider range of symptoms including thelarche, pubic hair growth, accelerated bone aging, increased growth velocity and early epiphyseal growth. If an individual is affected with CPP they will need to begin treatment immediately. CPP is treated with lutenizing hormone (LH) releasing hormone agonists. PT can impact growth velocity and bone age slightly, but CPP affects these characteristics to the point of detriment to the adult stature. Patients with suspected PT must undergo diagnostic testing to ensure it isn’t CPP or exaggerated thelarche, the intermediate stage before CPP.

Notable hormone differences occur between CPP and PT patients, so studying these hormone levels is the main biochemical diagnostic used in CPP. Individuals with CPP usually have a higher basal LH levels and LH:FSH ratios.

Few PT patients, 9 to 14%, are predicted to develop CPP. Observation allows clinicians to identify the presentation of CPP indicative symptoms in PT patients. No diagnostics tests can indicate if a PT patient is at risk of developing CPP.

== Diagnosis ==
Premature thelarche does not require treatment. In PT, breast hypertrophy will usually stop completely and patients will experience regression of the breast tissue over 3 to 60 months. Less commonly, patients may remain with residual breast tissue or continue through cycles of breast hypertrophy and regression until puberty.

Diagnostics are utilised in individuals with PT, especially at the presentation of other secondary sex characteristics. Diagnostics aim to ensure PT patients are not suffering from CPP.

=== Pelvic Ultrasounds ===
Pelvic ultrasounds are important in diagnosing CPP. Patients with CPP have an increased ovary and uterus size. The ovary and uterus volume of CPP patients is similar to that of females undergoing puberty. The pelvis ultrasound is problematic as a diagnostic, as there is not a specific cut-off for the uterine and ovary volumes that indicate the patient has CPP. Patients with PT should have a uterine and ovarian volume within the normal range for their age. Pelvic ultrasounds are a desirable diagnostic as they are non-invasive and easy to continually review. The pelvic ultrasound should be paired with biochemical tests to determine the presence of CPP.

=== Biochemical tests ===
Biochemical tests study the hormone levels in patients. CPP patients have elevated LH levels and peak LH:FSH ratios when compared to PT patients. It is hard to use LH as a diagnostic for CPP, as the LH assay has varying sensitivity and specificity. The GnRH stimulation test is the main diagnostic biochemical test used to distinguish PT from CPP. The GnRH test demonstrates the pituitary responsiveness to GnRH. GnRH stimulates the release of LH and FSH from the anterior pituitary. The peak LH:FSH ratio in CPP patients is similar to the ratio of pubertal females. Females with PT demonstrated a LH:FSH ratio lower than pubertal females. The disadvantages of the GnRH stimulation test is it takes a long time to perform and requires multiple collections from the patient, making the process time consuming and inconvenient. The test is highly specific but has low sensitivity as the LH hormone response is usually observed in later stages of CPP. There are also overlaps in the expected value in the GnRH test results of individuals with CPP and PT.

=== Combined diagnostic approach ===
The diagnostic inconsistency in CPP means that a combination of all of pelvic ultrasounds and biochemical tests should be paired with observation, to ensure PT doesn’t progress to CPP.

== Research ==
=== Exposure to environmental agents ===
Natural commodities like fennel, lavender and tea tree oils have been linked to PT. Lavender and tea tree oil have weak estrogenic activities. These estrogenic properties may cause an imbalance in endocrine signalling pathways, leading to PT in regular users of these products. Fennel tea has been studied as an endocrine disrupter linked to PT. Fennel seed oil contains anethole a compound with estrogenic effects. The tea contains fennel seed oil and regular use results in increased estradiol levels in the infant. Infants with fennel tea related PT, were given the tea as a homeopathic remedy for restlessness. The tea was consumed for at least four months before the presentation of PT symptoms. PT resulting from fennel tea subsides approximately six months after stopping the use of fennel tea.

=== Leptin ===
Leptin is an adipocyte hormone that has important implications of puberty and sex hormone secretion. Increased leptin has been linked to estrogen and estradiol secretion. Leptin has key roles in maintaining age appropriate body composition and desired weight. Leptin receptors are also found in mammary epithelial cells and leptin has been observed as a growth factor in breast tissue. Increased leptin levels have been observed in some cases of PT. The increase in leptin levels cause increased estradiol levels and development of breast tissue.

=== GNAS1 gene mutation ===
The form of PT with fluctuating hypertrophy in patients has been linked to activating mutations in the GNAS1 gene. This mutation accounts for a small number of cases of PT.

== See also ==
- Mammoplasia
- Breast hypertrophy
- Gynecomastia
