= Menarche =

Female human's first menstrual cycle

Menarche (/məˈnɑːrki/ mə-NAR-kee; from Ancient Greek μήν (mēn) 'month' and ἀρχή (arkhē) 'beginning') is the first menstrual cycle, or first menstrual bleeding, in female humans. From both social and medical perspectives, it is often considered the central event of female puberty, as it signals the possibility of fertility. Girls experience menarche at different ages, but the most common age is 12. Having menarche occur between the ages of 9–14 in the West is considered normal.

The timing of menarche is influenced by female biology, as well as genetic, environmental factors, and nutritional factors. The mean age of menarche has declined over the last century, but the magnitude of the decline and the factors responsible remain subjects of contention. The worldwide average age of menarche is very difficult to estimate accurately, and it varies significantly by geographical region, race, ethnicity and other characteristics, and occurs mostly during a span of ages from 8 to 16, with a small percentage of girls having menarche by age 10, and the vast majority having it by the time they were 14. There is a later age of onset in Asian populations compared to the West, but it too is changing with time. For example a Korean study in 2011 showed an overall average age of 12.7, with around 20% before age 12, and more than 90% by age 14. A Chinese study from 2014 published in Acta Paediatrica showed similar results (overall average of age 12.8 in 2005 down to age 12.3 in 2014) and a similar trend in time, but also similar findings about ethnic, cultural, and environmental effects. The average age of menarche was about 12.7 years in Canada in 2001, and 12.9 in the United Kingdom. A study of girls in Istanbul, Turkey, in 2011 found the median age at menarche to be 12.7 years. In the United States, an analysis of 10,590 women aged 15–44 taken from the 2013–2017 round of the CDC's National Survey of Family Growth found a median age of 11.9 years (down from 12.1 in 1995), with a mean of 12.5 years (down from 12.6).

== Physiology ==
=== Puberty ===
Menarche is the culmination of a series of physiological and anatomic processes of puberty:

- Attainment of a sufficient body fat percentage (typically around 17% of total body mass).
- Disinhibition of the GnRH pulse generator in the arcuate nucleus of the hypothalamus.
- Secretion of estrogen by the ovaries in response to pituitary hormones.
- Over an interval of about 2 to 3 years, estrogen stimulates growth of the uterus and breasts, as well as an increase in height, widening of the pelvis, and increased regional adipose tissue.
- Estrogen stimulates growth and vascularity of the endometrium, the lining of the uterus.
- Fluctuations of hormone levels can result in changes of adequacy of blood supply to parts of the endometrium.
- Death of some of the endometrial tissue from these hormone or blood supply fluctuations leads to deciduation, a sloughing off of part of the lining with some blood, which together flows from the vagina, i.e. menstrual flow.

Menarche tends to be painless and occurs without warning.

The menstruum, or flow, consists of a combination of fresh and clotted blood with endometrial tissue. Flow may be scanty in amount and might be as little as a single instance of "spotting". Like other menses, menarche may be accompanied by lower abdominal cramps.

=== Relation to fertility ===
For most girls, menarche does not mean that ovulation has occurred. In post-menarchal girls, about 80% of the cycles are anovulatory in the first year after menarche, 50% in the third, and 10% in the sixth year. Regular ovulation is usually indicated by predictable and consistent intervals between menses, and predictable and consistent patterns of flow (e.g., heaviness or cramping). Continuing ovulation typically requires a body fat percentage of at least 22%.

Not every girl follows the typical pattern. Some girls ovulate prior to their first menstruation. Although unlikely, it is possible for a girl who has engaged in sexual intercourse shortly before her menarche to conceive and become pregnant (delaying her menarche until after the end of her pregnancy, if she carries to full term).

Younger age of menarche is not correlated with a younger age of first sexual intercourse.

=== Onset ===
When menarche occurs, it confirms that the girl has had a gradual estrogen-induced growth of the uterus, especially the endometrium, and that the "outflow tract" from the uterus, through the cervix to the vagina, is open.

When experiencing menarche, the blood flow (colloquially described as having one's "period") can vary from a slow and spotty discharge to a consistent blood flow for 3–7 days. The color of the blood ranges from bright red to brown in color; this is normal. Periods may be light or heavy.

In very rare instances, menarche may occur at an unusually early age, preceding thelarche and other signs of puberty. This is termed isolated premature menarche, but other causes of vaginal bleeding must be investigated and excluded.

When menarche has failed to occur for more than three years after thelarche, or beyond 15 years of age, the delay is referred to as primary amenorrhea. Imperforate hymen is one cause of primary amenorrhea.

=== Timing ===
==== Chronic illness ====
Certain systemic or chronic illness can delay menarche, such as diabetes mellitus type 1, cystic fibrosis, asthma, inflammatory diseases, and untreated celiac disease, among others. Sometimes, lab tests do not return determinative results, so that underlying pathologies are not identified and the girl is diagnosed with constitutional growth delay.

==== Conditions and disease states ====
Studies have been conducted to observe the association of the timing of menarche with various conditions and diseases. Some studies have shown that there may be an association between early or late-age menarche and cardiovascular disease, although the mechanism of the association is not well understood. A systematic review has concluded that early onset of menarche is a risk factor for insulin resistance and breast cancer risk.

There is conflicting evidence regarding the association between obesity and timing of menarche; a meta-analysis and systematic review has determined that more studies must be conducted to make any definitive conclusions about this association.

==== Effects of stress and social environment ====
Some of the aspects of family structure and function reported to be independently associated with earlier menarche [antenatal and early childhood]

- Being non-white (in the UK)
- Having experienced pre-eclampsia in the womb
- Being a singleton, i.e. not a twin or triplet
- Low birthweight
- Not having been breast-fed
- Exposure to smoking
- High-conflict family relationships
- Lack of exercise in childhood

Other research has focused on the effect of childhood stress on timing of puberty, especially female. Stress is a vague term and studies have examined conditions ranging from family tensions or conflict to wartime refugee status with threat to physical survival. The more dire social conditions have been found to be associated with delay of maturation, an effect that is compounded by inadequate diet and nutrition. There is mixed evidence if milder degrees of stress can accelerate puberty in girls as would be predicted by life history theory and demonstrated in non-human mammals.

The understanding of these environmental effects is incomplete and the following cautions are relevant:

- Most of these "effects" are statistical associations revealed by epidemiologic surveys. Statistical associations are not necessarily causal, and secondary variables and alternative explanations can be possible instead. Effects of small size studies can never be confirmed or refuted for any individual child.
- Despite the small magnitude of effect, interpretations of the studies are politically controversial because this type of research is often be used for political advocacy. Accusations of bias based on political agenda sometimes accompany scientific criticism.
- Correlation does not imply causation. While correlation can be objectively measured, causation is statistically inferred. For example, some suggest that childhood stress is caused by precocious puberty recognized later, rather than being the cause of it.

==== Changes in time of average age ====
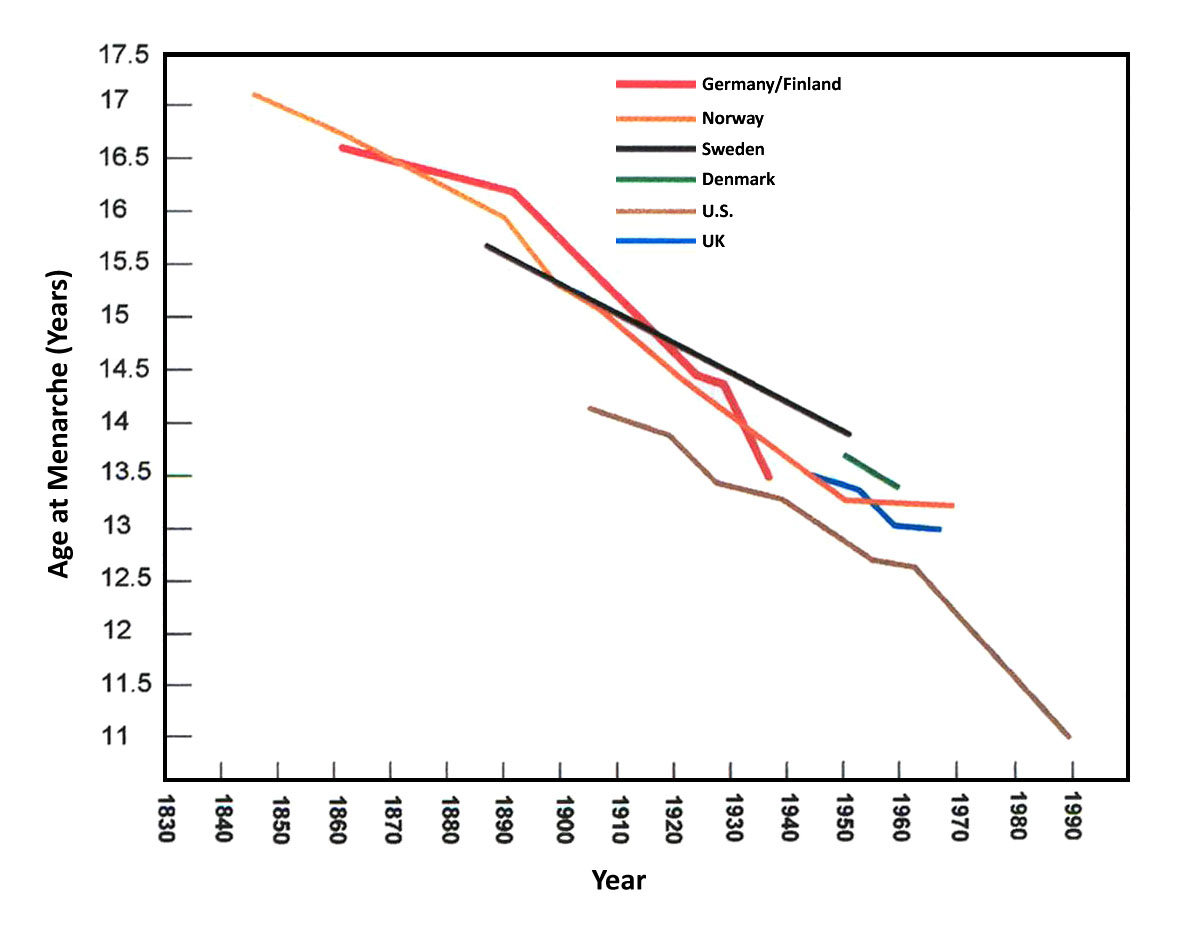
Secular trend in decrease in age of menarche in Western European and North American girls; Boaz (1999)

There were few systematic studies of timing of menarche before the second half of the 20th century. Most older estimates of average onset of menarche were based on observation of a small, homogeneous, non-representative sample of the larger population, or based on recall by adult women, which is susceptible to error. Most sources agree that the average age of menarche in girls in modern societies has declined, though the reasons and the degree remain subjects of study.

From the sixth to the 15th centuries in Europe, most women reached menarche at about 14, between the ages of 12 and 15. The average age of menarche dropped from 14–15 years in the early 20th century to 12–13 years in the present, but girls in the 19th century had a later age of menarche (16 to 18 years) compared to girls in earlier centuries. A large North American survey reported a 2–3 month decline from the mid-1970s to the mid-1990s. A 2011 study found that each 1 kg/m^{2} increase in childhood body-mass index (BMI) can be expected to result in a 6.5% higher absolute risk of early menarche (before age 12 years). This is called the secular trend.

In 2002, fewer than 10% of US girls started to menstruate before 11 years of age, and 90% of all US girls were menstruating by 13.75 years of age, with a median age of 12.43 years. This age at menarche is not much different (0.3 years earlier) than that reported for US girls in 1973. Age at menarche for non-Hispanic black girls was significantly earlier than that of white girls, whereas non-white Mexican-American girls were only slightly earlier than white girls.

== Society and culture ==
Menstruation is a cultural as well as scientific phenomenon as many societies have rituals, social norms, and religious laws associated with it. These typically begin at menarche and may be enacted during each menstruation cycle. The menarches are important in determining a status change for the girls. Upon menarche and completion of the ritual, they have become a woman as defined by their culture.

Canadian psychological researcher Niva Piran claims that menarche or the perceived average age of puberty is used in many cultures to separate girls from activity with boys, and to begin transition into womanhood.

=== Celebratory ceremonies ===
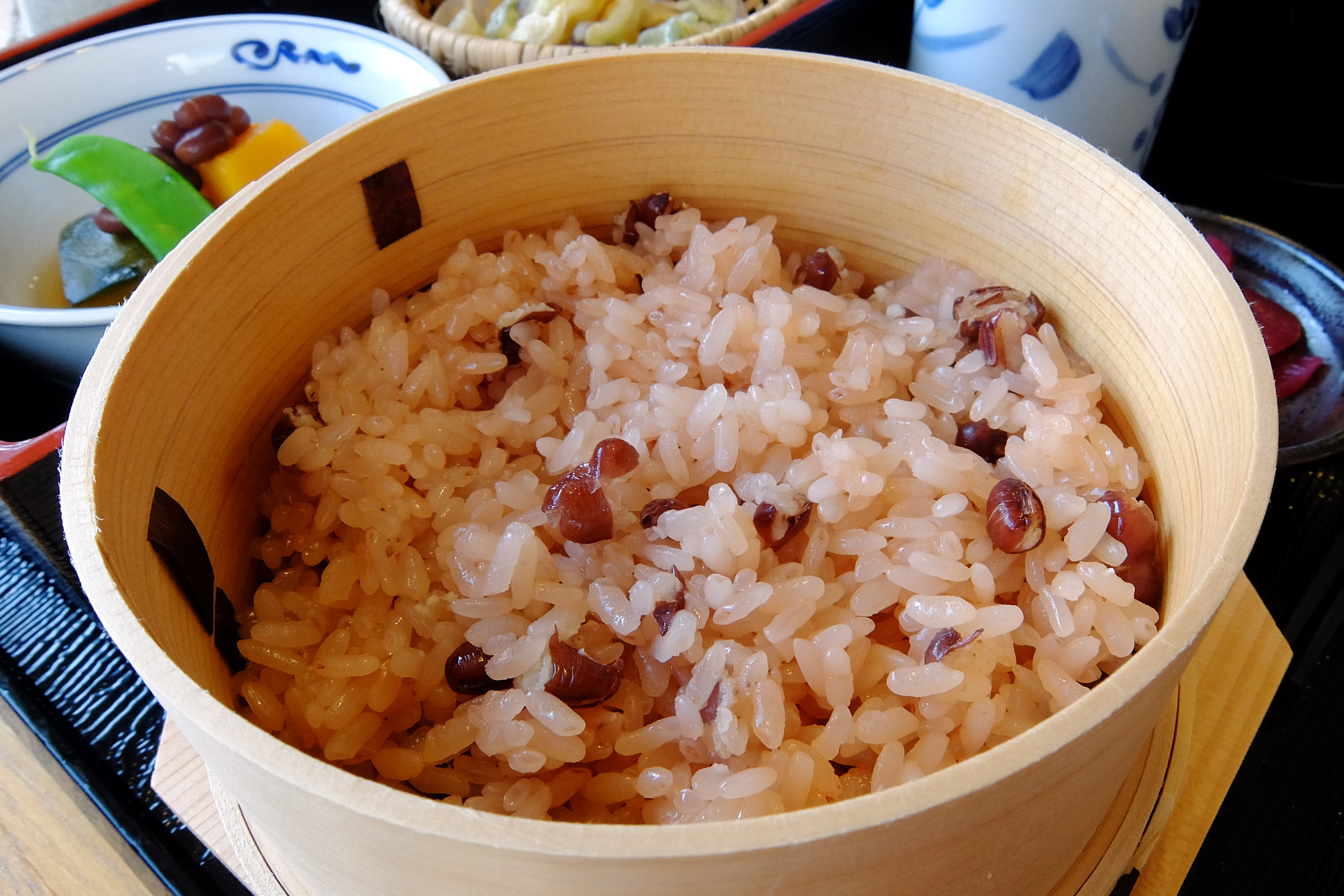
Sekihan, a traditional Japanese dish of sticky rice steamed with azuki beans, was sometimes served after menarche.

Some cultures have observed rites of passage such as a party or other celebration, for a girl experiencing menarche, in the past and the present.

==== Past ====
In ancient Japan, when a Japanese girl had her first period, the family sometimes celebrated by eating red-colored rice and beans (sekihan). Although both blood and sekihan rice are red, this was not of symbolic significance. All rice in ancient Japan was red; it was also rare and precious. (At most other times, millet was eaten instead.) The celebration was kept a secret from extended family until the rice was served.

==== Present ====
In South Indian Hindu communities, young women are given a special menarche ceremony called Ruthu Sadangu; at that time, they begin to wear two-piece saris.

In Morocco, the girl is thrown a celebration. All of her family members are invited and the girl is showered with money and gifts. Quinceañera in Latin America, is similar, except that the specific age of 15 marks the transition rather than menarche.

The Mescalero Apaches place high importance on their menarche ceremony and it is regarded as the most important ritual in their tribe. Each year, there is an eight-day event celebrating all of the girls who have menstruated in the past year. The days are split between feasting and private ceremonies reflecting on their new womanly status.

In the United States, public schools have a sex education program that teaches girls about menstruation and what to expect at the onset of menarche; this takes place between the fifth and eight grades. Like most of the modern industrialized world, menstruation is a private matter and a girl's menarche is not a community phenomenon.

=== Rituals of purification ===
The Ulithi tribe of Micronesia call a girl's menarche kufar. She goes to a menstrual house, where the women bathe her and recite spells. She will have to return to the menstruation hut every time she menstruates. Her parents build her a private hut that she will live in until she is married.

In Sri Lanka, an astrologer is contacted to study the alignment of stars when the girl experiences menarche because it is believed that her future can be predicted. The women of the family then gather in her home and scrub her in a ritual bathing ceremony. Her family then throws a familial party at which the girl wears white and may receive gifts.

In Ethiopia, Beta Israel Jewish women were separated from male society and sent to menstruation huts during menarche and every menstruation following as the blood associated with menstruation in the Beta Israel Jewish culture was believed to be impure. The Beta Israel Jews built their villages surrounding and near bodies of water specifically for their women to have a place to clean themselves. The menstruation huts were built close to these bodies of water.

In India, purdah is practiced by some Hindu and Muslim communities. Women, starting at menarche and continuing with each subsequent period, are separated from men, and also wear different garments to conceal their skin during menstruation.

In Australia, the Aboriginals treat a girl to "love magic". She is taught the ways of womanhood by the other women in her tribe. Her mother builds her a menstruation hut to which she confines herself for the remainder of her menses. The hut is burned and she is bathed in the river at the end of menstruation. When she returns to the village, she is paired with a man who will be her husband.

In Nigeria, the Tiv ethnic group cut four lines into the abdomen of their girls during menarche. The lines are supposed to represent fertility.

=== Rituals of strength ===
The Navajo have a celebration called kinaalda. Girls are expected to demonstrate their strength through footraces. The girls make a cornmeal pudding for the tribe to taste. Girls who undergo menarche wear special clothes and style their hair like the Navajo goddess Changing Woman.

The Nuu-chah-nulth (also known as the Nootka) believe that physical endurance is the most important quality in young women. At menarche the girl is taken out to sea and left there to swim back.

== Movies, TV, and novels ==
Girls experiencing their first periods are part of many movies, particularly ones that include coming-of-age plot lines, such as The Blue Lagoon (1980), The Company of Wolves (1984), An Angel at My Table (1990), Only Yesterday (1991), My Girl (1991), Return to the Blue Lagoon (1991), Eve's Bayou (1997), and A Walk on the Moon (1999).

Menarche is also discussed in an episode of the Disney Channel animated series Baymax! (2022) in which the eponymous healthcare robot helps a girl deal with her first period.

In a 2022 episode of The Ghost and Molly McGee called "A Period Piece", Molly's friend Libby experiences her first period during a sleepover. Molly, not having experienced menarche yet, feels insecure about her maturity and tries to prove her friends that she can be as mature as them.

A third Disney Channel cartoon, Moon Girl and Devil Dinosaur, touched on the subject in the 2025 episode "Full Moon", in which the titular superhero experiences her first period, which helps fix her strained relationship with her mother.

In the horror movie Carrie (1976), an adaptation of the Stephen King novel of the same name, protagonist Carrie White experiences menarche as she showers after the school gym class. Unaware of what is happening to her, she panics and pleads for help, but the other girls respond by bullying her. Menarche unleashes Carrie's telekinetic powers which are key to her wild transformation that causes death and destruction. This theme is common to horror movies, another example being the Canadian horror movie Ginger Snaps (2000), where the protagonist's first period is central to her gradual transformation into a werewolf. The theme of transformation around menarche is similarly present in Turning Red (2022), although the film also explores other aspects of puberty and the protagonist does not yet have her first period.

One of the better-known middle reader (8 to 12 year old) novels in the US and Canada about the year leading up to menarche in the 1970s to 1990s is Are You There God? It's Me, Margaret (1970) by Judy Blume.

== See also ==
- Puberty
- Gonadarche
- Thelarche
- Menopause, the equivalent opposite change at the end of the child-bearing years
- Delayed puberty
