= Child development =

Stages in the development of children

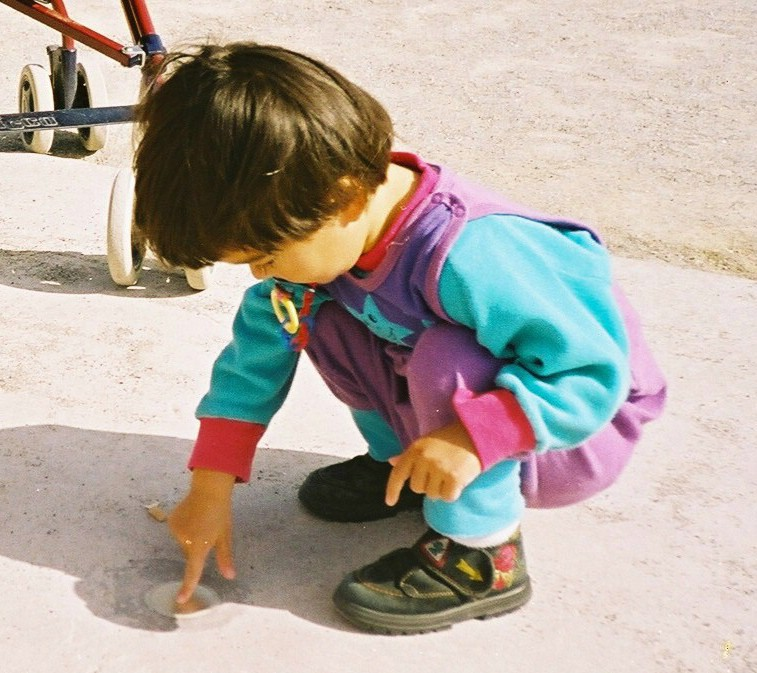
A child using their fingers to make a small, circular hole in the sand

Child development involves the biological, psychological and emotional changes that occur in human beings between birth and the conclusion of adolescence. It is—particularly from birth to five years— a foundation for a prosperous and sustainable society.

Childhood is divided into three stages of life which include early childhood, middle childhood, and late childhood (preadolescence). Early childhood typically ranges from infancy to the age of 6 years old. During this period, development is significant, as many of life's milestones happen during this time period such as first words, learning to crawl, and learning to walk. Middle childhood/preadolescence or ages 6–10 universally mark a distinctive period between major developmental transition points. Adolescence often begins around the onset of puberty, marked as menarche or spermarche, occurring between 10 and 12 years of age, and ends upon acquiring the age of maturity. Adolescence is characterized by maturation of the body, increase in capacity for learning, and emergence of personal identity. Developmental change may occur as a result of genetically controlled processes, known as maturation, or environmental factors and learning, but most commonly involves an interaction between the two. Early childhood development is impacted by the traits of the child, family, and social environment. Development may also occur as a result of human nature and of human ability to learn from the environment.

There are various definitions of the periods in a child's development, since each period is a continuum with individual differences regarding starting and ending. Some age-related development periods with defined intervals include: newborn (ages 0–2 months); infant (ages 3–11 months); toddler (ages 1–2 years); preschooler (ages 3–4 years); prime childhood (ages 5–8 years); preteens (ages 9-12 years); and teens (ages 13–19 years).

Parents play a large role in a child's activities, socialization, and development; having multiple parents can add stability to a child's life and therefore encourage healthy development. A parent-child relationship with a stable foundation creates room for a child to feel both supported and safe. This environment established to express emotions is a building block that leads to children effectively regulating emotions and furthering their development. Another influential factor in children's development is the quality of their care. Child-care programs may be beneficial for childhood development such as learning capabilities and social skills.

The optimal development of children is considered vital to society and it is important to understand the social, cognitive, emotional, and educational development of children. Increased research and interest in this field has resulted in new theories and strategies, especially with regard to practices that promote development within the school systems. Some theories seek to describe a sequence of states that compose child development.

== Theories ==
=== Ecological system ===
Also called "development in context" or "human ecology" theory, ecological systems theory was originally formulated by Urie Bronfenbrenner. It specifies four types of nested environmental systems, with bi-directional influences within and between the systems; they are the microsystem, mesosystem, exosystem, and macrosystem. Each system contains roles, norms, and rules that can powerfully shape development. Since its publication in 1979, Bronfenbrenner's major statement of this theory, The Ecology of Human Development, has had widespread influence on the way psychologists and others approach the study of human beings and their environments. As a result of this influential conceptualization of development, these environments – from the family to economic and political structures – have come to be viewed as part of the life course from childhood through adulthood.

=== Piaget ===
Jean Piaget was a Swiss scholar who began his studies in intellectual development in the 1920s. Interested in the ways animals adapt to their environments, his first scientific article was published when he was 10 years old, and he pursued a Ph.D. in zoology, where he became interested in epistemology. Epistemology branches off from philosophy and deals with the origin of knowledge, which Piaget believed came from Psychology. After travelling to Paris, he began working on the first "standardized intelligence test" at Alfred Binet laboratories, which influenced his career greatly. During this intelligence testing he began developing a profound interest in the way children's intellectualism works. As a result, he developed his own laboratory, where he spent years recording children's intellectual growth and attempting to find out how children develop through various stages of thinking. This led Piaget to develop four important stages of cognitive development: sensorimotor stage (birth to age 2), preoperational stage (age 2 to 7), concrete-operational stage (ages 7 to 12), and formal-operational stage (ages 11 to 12, and thereafter). Piaget concluded that adaption to an environment (behaviour) is managed through schemas and adaption occurs through assimilation and accommodation.

==== Stages ====
Sensory Motor: (birth to about age 2)

In the first stage in Piaget's theory, infants have the following basic senses: vision, hearing, and motor skills. In this stage, knowledge of the world is limited but is constantly developing due to the child's experiences and interactions. According to Piaget, when an infant reaches about 7–9 months of age they begin to develop what he called object permanence, meaning the child now has the ability to understand that objects keep existing even when they cannot be seen. An example of this would be hiding the child's favorite toy under a blanket, and although the child cannot physically see it they still know to look under the blanket.

Preoperational: (begins about the time the child starts to talk, around age 2)

During this stage, young children begin analyzing their environment using mental symbols, including words and images; the child will begin to apply these in their everyday lives as they come across different objects, events, and situations. However, Piaget's main focus on this stage, and the reason why he named it "preoperational", is that children at this point are not able to apply specific cognitive operations, such as mental math. In addition to symbolism, children start to engage in pretend play, pretending to be people they are not, for example teachers or superheroes; they sometimes use different props to make this pretend play more real. Some weaknesses in this stage are that children who are about 3–4 years old often display what is called egocentrism, meaning the child is not able to see someone else's point of view, and they feel as if every other person is experiencing the same events and feelings that they are. However, at about 7, thought processes of children are no longer egocentric and are more intuitive, meaning they now think about the way something looks, though they do not yet use rational thinking.

Concrete: (about first grade to early adolescence)

In this stage, children between the age of 7 and 11 use appropriate logic to develop cognitive operations and begin applying this new way of thinking to different events they encounter. Children in this stage incorporate inductive reasoning, which involves drawing conclusions from other observations in order to make a generalization. Unlike in the preoperational stage, children can now change and rearrange mental images and symbols to form a logical thought, an example of this is "reversibility", where the child now knows to reverse an action by doing the opposite.

Formal operations: (around early adolescence to mid/late adolescence)

The final stage of Piaget's cognitive development defines a child as now having the ability to "think more rationally and systematically about abstract concepts and hypothetical events". Some strengths during this time are that the child or adolescent begins forming their identity and begins understanding why people behave the way they behave. While some weaknesses include the child or adolescent developing some egocentric thoughts, including the imaginary audience and the personal fable. An imaginary audience is when an adolescent feels that the world is just as concerned and judgemental of anything the adolescent does as they themselves are; an adolescent may feel as if they are "on stage" and everyone is a critic and they are the ones being critiqued. A personal fable is when the adolescent feels that he or she is a unique person and everything they do is unique. They feel as if they are the only ones that have ever experienced what they are experiencing and that they are invincible and nothing bad will happen to them, bad things only happen to other people.

=== Vygotsky ===
Vygotsky, a Russian theorist, proposed the sociocultural theory of child development. During the 1920s–1930s, while Piaget was developing his own theory, Vygotsky was an active scholar and at that time his theory was said to be "recent" because it was translated out of Russian and began influencing Western thinking. He posited that children learn through hands-on experience, as Piaget suggested. However, unlike Piaget, he claimed that timely and sensitive intervention by adults when a child is on the edge of learning a new task (called the zone of proximal development) could help children learn new tasks. This technique, called "scaffolding", builds new knowledge onto the knowledge children already have to help the child learn. An example of this might be when a parent "helps" an infant clap or roll their hands to the pat-a-cake rhyme, until they can clap and roll their hands themself.

Vygotsky was strongly focused on the role of culture in determining the child's pattern of development. He argued that "Every function in the child's cultural development appears twice: first, on the social level, and later, on the individual level; first, between people (interpsychological) and then inside the child (intrapsychological). This applies equally to voluntary attention, to logical memory, and to the formation of concepts. All the higher functions originate as actual relationships between individuals."

Vygotsky felt that development was a process, and saw that during periods of crisis there was a qualitative transformation in the child's mental functioning.

=== Attachment ===
Attachment theory, originating in the work of John Bowlby and developed by Mary Ainsworth, is a psychological, evolutionary and ethological theory that provides a descriptive and explanatory framework for understanding interpersonal relationships. Bowlby's observations led him to believe that close emotional bonds or "attachments" between an infant and their primary caregiver were an important requirement for forming "normal social and emotional development".

=== Erik Erikson ===
Erikson, a follower of Freud, synthesized his theories with Freud's to create what is known as the "psychosocial" stages of human development. Spanning from birth to death, they focus on "tasks" at each stage that must be accomplished to successfully navigate life's challenges.

Erikson's eight stages consist of the following:

- Trust vs. mistrust (infant)
- Autonomy vs. shame (toddlerhood)
- Initiative vs. guilt (preschooler)
- Industry vs. inferiority (young adolescent)
- Identity vs. role confusion (adolescent)
- Intimacy vs. isolation (young adulthood)
- Generativity vs. stagnation (middle adulthood)
- Ego integrity vs. despair (old age)

=== Behavioral ===
John B. Watson's behaviorism theory forms the foundation of the behavioral model of development. Watson explained human psychology through the process of classical conditioning, and he believed that all individual differences in behavior were due to different learning experiences. He wrote extensively on child development and conducted research, such as the Little Albert experiment, which showed that a phobia could be created by classical conditioning. Watson was instrumental in the modification of William James' stream of consciousness approach to construct behavior theory. He also helped bring a natural science perspective to child psychology by introducing objective research methods based on observable and measurable behavior. Following Watson's lead, B.F. Skinner further extended this model to cover operant conditioning and verbal behavior. Skinner used the operant chamber, or Skinner box, to observe the behavior of animals in a controlled situation and proved that behaviors are influenced by the environment. Furthermore, he used reinforcement and punishment to shape the desired behavior. Children's behavior can strongly depend on their psychological development.

=== Freud ===
Sigmund Freud divided development, from infancy onward, into five stages. In accordance with his view that the sexual drive is a basic human motivation, each stage centered around the gratification of the libido within a particular area, or erogenous zone, of the body. He argued that as humans develop, they become fixated on different and specific objects throughout their stages of development. Each stage contains conflict which requires resolution to enable the child to develop.

=== Other ===
The use of dynamical systems theory as a framework for the consideration of development began in the early 1990s and has continued into the present. This theory stresses nonlinear connections (e.g., between earlier and later social assertiveness) and the capacity of a system to reorganize as a phase shift that is stage-like in nature. Another useful concept for developmentalists is the attractor state, a condition (such as teething or stranger anxiety) that helps to determine apparently unrelated behaviors as well as related ones. Dynamic systems theory has been applied extensively to the study of motor development; the theory also has strong associations with some of Bowlby's views about attachment systems. Dynamic systems theory also relates to the concept of the transactional process, a mutually interactive process in which children and parents simultaneously influence each other, producing developmental change in both over time.

The "core knowledge perspective" is an evolutionary theory in child development that proposes "infants begin life with innate, special-purpose knowledge systems referred to as core domains of thought". These five domains are each crucial for survival, and prepare us to develop key aspects of early cognition, they are: physical, numerical, linguistic, psychological, and biological.

== Beginning of cognition ==
The most influential theories emphasize social interaction's essential contribution to child development from birth (e.g., the theories of Bronfenbrenner, Piaget, Vygotsky). It means that organisms with simple reflexes begin to cognize the environment in collaboration with caregivers. However, different viewpoints on this issue - the binding problem and the primary data entry problem - challenge the ability of children in this stage of development to meaningfully interact with the environment.

Recent advances in neuroscience and wisdom from physiology and physics studies reconsider the knowledge gap on how social interaction provides cognition in newborns and infants. Developmental psychologist Michael Tomasello contributed to knowledge about the origins of social cognition in children by developing the notion of Shared intentionality. He posed ideas about unaware processes during social learning after birth to explain processes in shaping Intentionality. Other researchers developed the notion, by observing this collaborative interaction in psychophysiological research.

This concept has been expanded to the intrauterine period. Research professor in bioengineering at Liepaja University Igor Val Danilov developed the idea of Michael Tomasello by introducing a Mother-Fetus Neurocognitive model: a hypothesis of neurophysiological processes occurring during Shared intentionality. It explains the onset of childhood development, describing this cooperative interaction at different levels of bio-system complexity, from interpersonal dynamics to neuronal interactions. The Shared intentionality hypothesis argues that nervous system synchronization provides non-local neuronal coupling in a mother-child pair, contributing to the proper development of the child's nervous system from the embryo onward. From the cognitive development perspective, this non-local neuronal coupling enables the mother to indicate the relevant sensory stimulus of an actual cognitive problem to the child, helping the child to grasp the perception of the object. This prerequisite of Shared intentionality, the pre-perceptual multimodal integration, succeeds owing to neuronal coherence in the mother-fetus biosystem beginning from pregnancy. These cognitive-reflex and emotion-reflex stimuli conjunctions further form innate neuronal assemblies, shaping the cognitive and emotional neuronal patterns in statistical learning that, as empirical evidence has shown, are continuously connected with the neuronal pathways of reflexes. The natural neurostimulation of the mother's heart on the embryonal nervous system ensures the balanced architecture of the nervous system with the necessary cognitive functions corresponding to the ecological context. Electromagnetic properties of the mother's heart and its interaction with the mother's own and fetal nervous system (physical laws of electromagnetic interference) form neuronal coherence in the mother-fetus bio-system, providing the template beginning from pregnancy.

A growing body of evidence in neuroscience supports the Shared intentionality approach. Hyperscanning research studies show inter-brain coordinated activity under conditions without communication in pairs while subjects are solving a shared cognitive task This increased inter-brain activity is observed in pairs, which differs from the result in the condition where subjects solve a similar task alone. The significance of this knowledge is that although Shared intentionality enables social cooperation to be achieved in the unaware condition (unconsciously), it constitutes society. While this social interaction modality facilitates child development, it also contributes to grasping social norms and shaping individual values in children.

== Continuity and discontinuity ==
Although the identification of developmental milestones is of interest to researchers and caregivers, many aspects of development are continuous and do not display noticeable milestones. Continuous changes, like growth in stature, involve fairly gradual and predictable progress toward adult characteristics. When developmental change is discontinuous, however, researchers may identify not only milestones of development, but related age periods often called stages. These stages are periods of time, often associated with known age ranges, during which a behavior or physical characteristic is qualitatively different from what it is at other ages. When an age period is referred to as a stage, the term implies not only this qualitative difference, but also a predictable sequence of developmental events, such that each stage is preceded and followed by specific other periods associated with characteristic behavioral or physical qualities.

Stages of development may overlap or be associated with specific other aspects of development, such as speech or movement. Even within a particular developmental area, transition into a stage may not mean that the previous stage is completely finished. For example, in Erikson's stages, he suggests that a lifetime is spent in reworking issues that were originally characteristic of a childhood stage. Similarly, the theorist of cognitive development, Piaget, described situations in which children could solve one type of problem using mature thinking skills, but could not accomplish this for less familiar problems, a phenomenon he called horizontal decalage.

=== Mechanisms ===
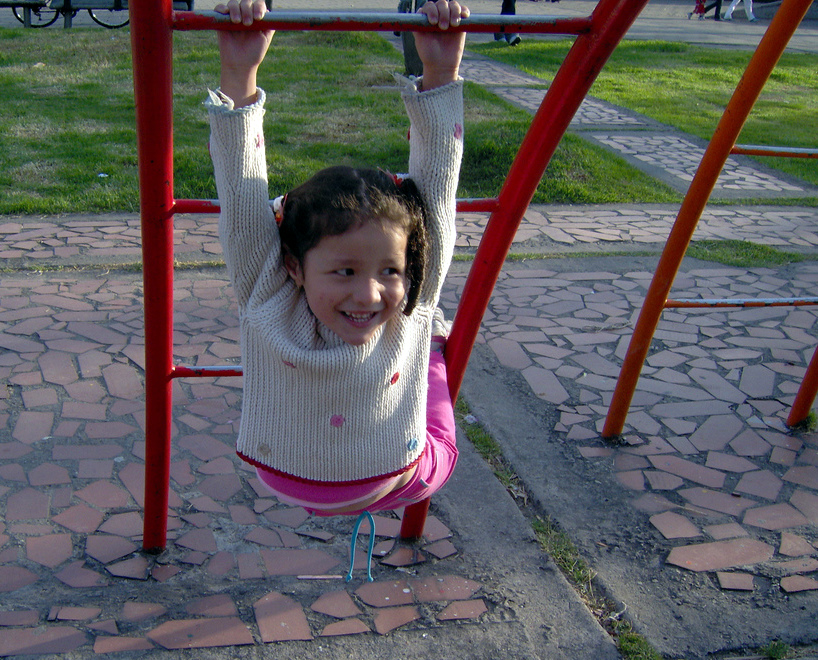
Girl playing in a playground

Although developmental change runs parallel with chronological age, age itself cannot cause development. The basic causes for developmental change are genetic and environmental factors. Genetic factors are responsible for cellular changes like overall growth, changes in proportion of body and brain parts, and the maturation of aspects of function such as vision and dietary needs. Because genes can be "turned off" and "turned on", the individual's initial genotype may change in function over time, giving rise to further developmental change. Environmental factors affecting development may include both diet and disease exposure, as well as social, emotional, and cognitive experiences. However, examination of environmental factors also shows that children can survive a fairly broad range of environmental experiences.

Rather than acting as independent mechanisms, genetic and environmental factors often interact to cause developmental change. Some aspects of child development are notable for their plasticity, or the extent to which the direction of development is guided by environmental factors as well as initiated by genetic factors. When an aspect of development is strongly affected by early experience, it is said to show a high degree of plasticity; when the genetic make-up is the primary cause of development, plasticity is said to be low. Plasticity may involve guidance by endogenous factors like hormones as well as by exogenous factors like infection.

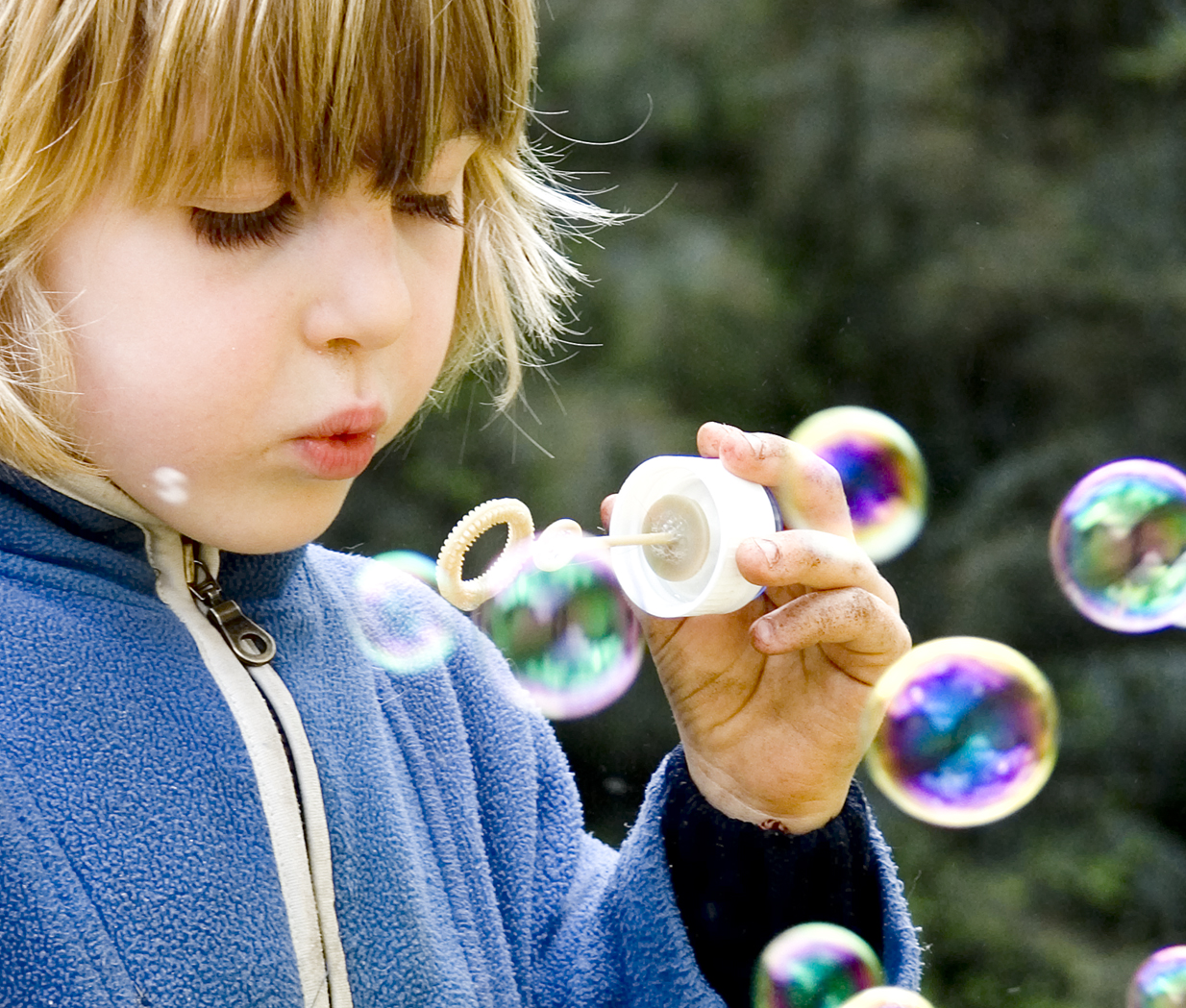
Child playing with bubbles

One way the environment guides development is through experience-dependent plasticity, in which behavior is altered as a result of learning from the environment. Plasticity of this type can occur throughout the lifespan and involve many kinds of behavior, including some emotional reactions. A second type of plasticity, experience-expectant plasticity, involves the strong effect of specific experiences during limited sensitive periods of development. For example, the coordinated use of two eyes, and the experience of a single three-dimensional image rather than the two-dimensional images created by each eye, depends on experiences with vision during the second half of the first year of life. Experience-expectant plasticity works to fine-tune aspects of development that cannot proceed to optimum outcomes as a result of genetic factors alone.

In addition to plasticity, genetic-environmental correlations may function in several ways to determine the mature characteristics of the individual. Genetic-environmental correlations are circumstances in which genetic factors interact with the environment to make certain experiences more likely to occur. In passive genetic-environmental correlation, a child is likely to experience a particular environment because his or her parents' genetic make-up makes them likely to choose or create such an environment. In evocative genetic-environmental correlation, the child's genetically produced characteristics cause other people to respond in certain ways, providing a different environment than might occur for a genetically different child; for instance, a child with Down syndrome may be protected more and challenged less than a child without Down syndrome. Finally, an active genetic-environmental correlation is one in which the child chooses experiences that in turn have their effect, for instance, a muscular, active child may choose after-school sports experiences that increase athletic skills, but may forgo music lessons. In all of these cases, it becomes difficult to know whether the child's characteristics were shaped by genetic factors, by experiences, or by a combination of the two.

=== Asynchronous development ===
Asynchronous development occurs in cases when a child's cognitive, physical, and/or emotional development occur at different rates. This is common for gifted children when their cognitive development outpaces their physical and/or emotional maturity, such as when a child is academically advanced and skipping school grade levels yet still cries over childish matters and/or still looks their age. Asynchronous development presents challenges for schools, parents, siblings, peers, and the children themselves, such as making it hard for the child to fit in or frustrating adults who have become accustomed to the child's advancement in other areas.

== Research issues and methods ==
Research questions include:

1. What develops? What relevant aspects of the individual change over a period of time?
2. What are the rate and speed of development?
3. What are the mechanisms of development – what aspects of experience and heredity cause developmental change?
4. Are there typical individual differences in the relevant developmental changes?
5. Are there population differences in this aspect of development (for example, differences in the development of boys and of girls)?

Empirical research that attempts to answer these questions may follow a number of patterns. Initially, observational research in naturalistic conditions may be needed to develop a narrative describing and defining an aspect of developmental change, such as changes in reflex reactions in the first year. Observational research may be followed by correlational studies, which collect information about chronological age and some type of development, such as increasing vocabulary; such studies examine the characteristics of children at different ages. Other methods may include longitudinal studies, in which a group of children is re-examined on a number of occasions as they get older; cross-sectional studies, where groups of children of different ages are tested once and compared with each other; or there may be a combination of these approaches. Some child development studies that examine the effects of experience or heredity by comparing characteristics of different groups of children cannot use a randomized design; while other studies use randomized designs to compare outcomes for groups of children who receive different interventions or educational treatments.

=== Infant research methods ===
When conducting psychological research on infants and children, certain key aspects need to be considered. These include that infants cannot talk, have a limited behavioral repertoire, cannot follow instructions, have a short attention span, and that, due to how rapidly infants develop, methods need to be updated for different ages and developmental stages.

High-amplitude sucking technique (HAS) is a common way to explore infants' preferences, and is appropriate from birth to four months since it takes advantage of infants' sucking reflex. When this is being measured, researchers will code a baseline sucking rate for each baby before exposing them to the item of interest. A common finding of HAS shows a relaxed, natural sucking rate when exposed to something the infant is familiar with, like their mother's voice, compared to an increased sucking rate around novel stimuli.

The preferential-looking technique was a breakthrough made by Robert L. Fantz in 1961. In his experiments, he would show the infants in his study two different stimuli. If an infant looks at one image longer than the other, there are two things that can be inferred: the infant can see that they are two different images and that the infant is showing preference to one image in some capacity. Depending on the experiment, infants may prefer to look at the novel and more interesting stimulus or they may look at the more comforting and familiar image.

Eye tracking is a straightforward way of looking at infants' preferences. Using an eye tracking software, it is possible to see if infants understand commonly used nouns by tracking their eyes after they are cued with the target word.

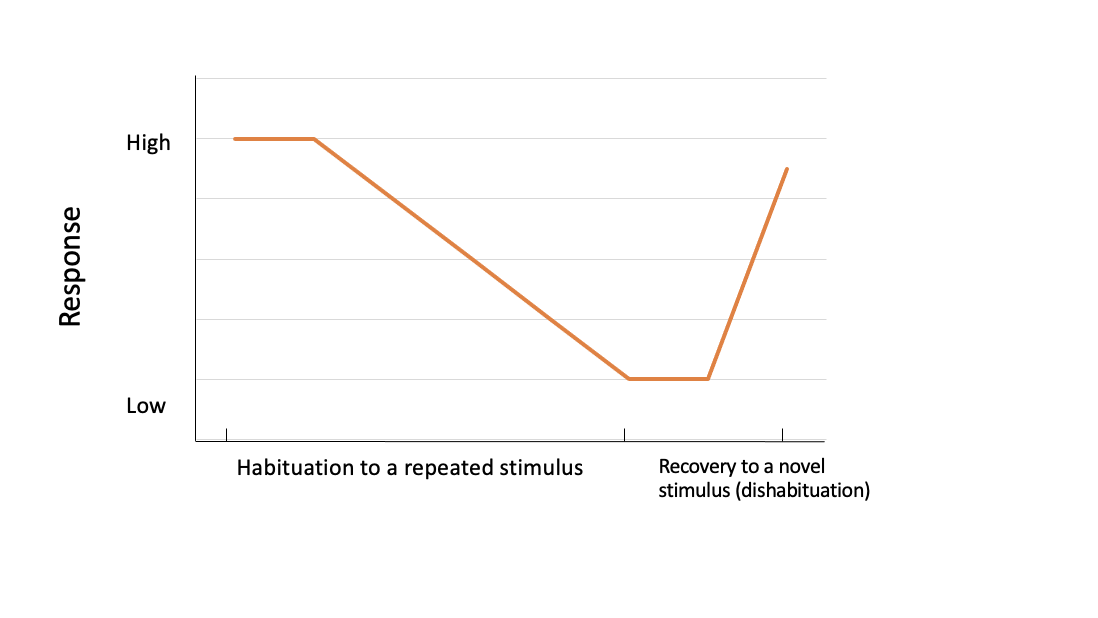
Typical pattern of habituation

Another unique way to study infants' cognition is through habituation, which is the process of repeatedly showing a stimulus to an infant until they give no response. Then, when infants are presented with a novel stimulus, they show a response, which reveals patterns of cognition and perception. Using this study method, many different cognitive and perceptual ideas can be studied. Looking time, a common measure of habituation, is studied by recording how long an infant looks at a stimulus before they are habituated to it. Then, researchers record if an infant becomes dishabituated to a novel stimulus. This method can be used to measure preferences infants, including preferences for colors, and other discriminatory tasks, such as auditory discrimination between different musical excerpts.

Another way of studying children is through brain imaging technology, such as Magnetic Resonance Imaging (MRI), electroencephalography (EEG). MRI can be used to track brain activity, growth, and connectivity in children, and can track brain development from when a child is a fetus. EEG can be used to diagnose seizures and encephalopathy, but the conceptual age of the infant must be considered when analyzing the results.

=== Ethical considerations ===
Most of the ethical challenges that exist in studies with adults also exist in studying children, with some notable differences. Namely informed consent, as while it is important that children consent to participate in research, they cannot give legal consent; parents must give informed consent for their children. Children can informally consent though, and their continued agreement should be reliably checked for by both verbal and nonverbal cues throughout their participation. Also, due to the inherent power structure in most research settings, researchers must consider study designs that protect children from feeling coerced.

== Milestones ==
Milestones are changes in specific physical and mental abilities (such as walking and understanding language) that mark the end of one developmental period and the beginning of another; for stage theories, milestones indicate a stage transition. These milestones, and the chronological age at which they typically occur, have been established via study of when various developmental tasks are accomplished. However, there is considerable variation in when milestones are reached, even between children developing within the typical range. Some milestones are more variable than others; for example, receptive speech indicators do not show much variation among children with typical hearing, but expressive speech milestones can be quite variable.

A common concern in child development is delayed development of age-specific developmental milestones. Preventing, and intervening early, in developmental delays is a significant topic in the study of child development. Developmental delays are characterized by comparison with age variability of a milestone, not with respect to average age at achievement.

== Physical aspects of development ==
=== Physical growth ===
For North American, Indo-Iranian (India, Iran), and European ...
girls	boys
Thelarche (breast development) 10.5y (8y–13y); Pubarche (pubic hair) 11y (8.5y–13.5y); Growth spurt 11.25y (10y–12.5y); Menarche (first menstrual bleeding) 12.5y (10.5y–14.5y); Wisdom tooth eruption 15.5y (14y-17y); Adult height reached 15.5y (14y–17y)	Gonadarche (testicular enlargement) 11.5y (9.5y–13.5y); Pubarche (pubic hair) 12y (10y–14y); Growth spurt 13y (11y–15y); Spermarche (first ejaculation) 13.5y (11.5y–15.5y); Wisdom tooth eruption 17y (15y-19y); Completion of growth 17y (15y–19y)

Physical growth in stature and weight occurs for 15–20 years following birth, as the individual changes from the average weight of 3.5 kg (7.7 lb) and length of 50 cm (20 in) at full term birth to their final adult size. As stature and weight increase, proportions also change, from the relatively large head and small torso and limbs of the neonate, to the adult's relatively small head and long torso and limbs. In a book directed toward pediatricians it says a child's pattern of growth is in a head-to-toe direction, or cephalocaudal, and in an inward to outward pattern (center of the body to the peripheral) called proximodistal.

Development from childhood to the end of puberty, from The Adolescent Period

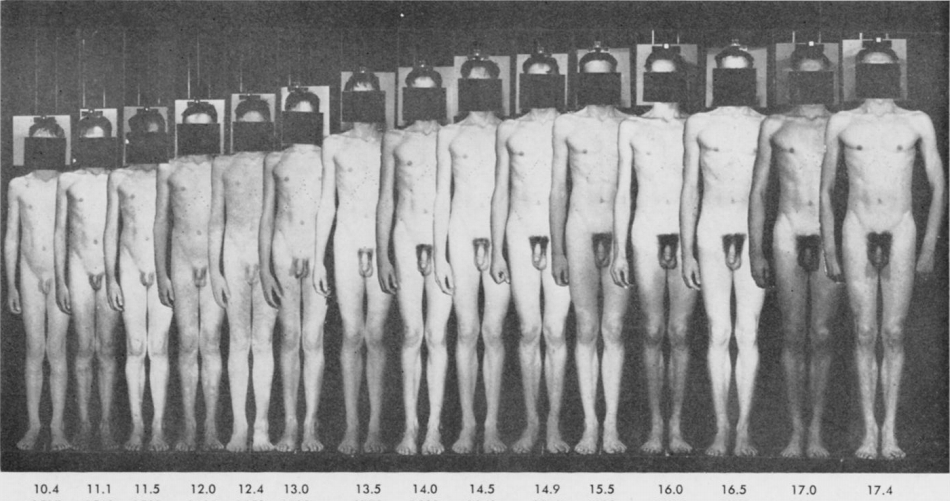
Development of a boy from 10 to 17 years old

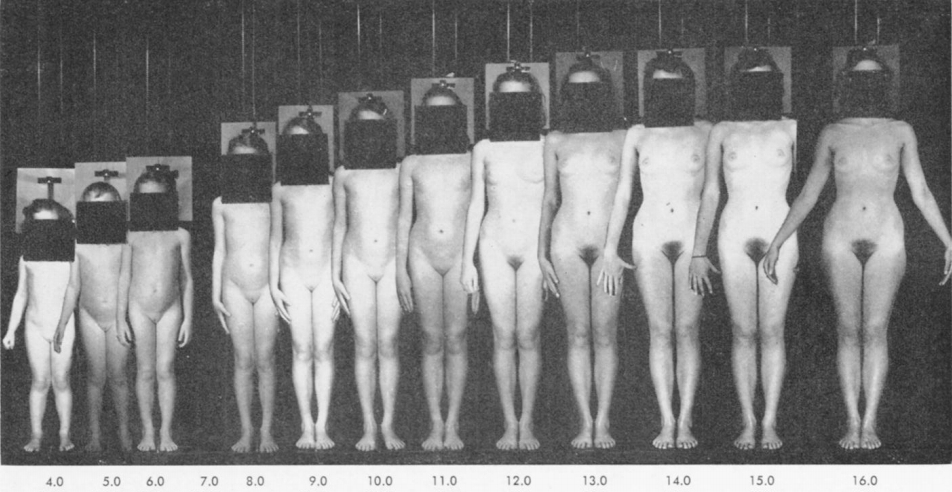
Development of a girl from 4 to 16 years old

==== Speed and pattern ====
The speed of physical growth is rapid in the months after birth, then slows, so birth weight is doubled in the first four months, tripled by 1 year, but not quadrupled until 2 years. Growth then proceeds at a slow rate until a period of rapid growth occurs shortly before puberty (between about 9 and 15 years of age). Growth is not uniform in rate and timing across all parts of the body. At birth, head size is already relatively near that of an adult, but the lower parts of the body are much smaller than adult size. Thus during development, the head grows relatively little, while the torso and limbs undergo a great deal of growth.

==== Mechanisms of change ====
Genetic factors play a major role in determining the growth rate, particularly in the characteristic changes in proportions during early human development. However, genetic factors can produce maximum growth only if environmental conditions are adequate, as poor nutrition, frequent injury, or disease can reduce the individual's adult stature; though even the best environment cannot cause growth to a greater stature than is determined by heredity.

==== Individual variation versus disease ====
Individual differences in height and weight during childhood can be considerable. Some of these differences are due to genetic or environmental factors, but individual differences in reproductive maturation strongly influence development at some points. For individuals falling outside these typical variations, the American Association of Clinical Endocrinologists defines short stature as height more than 2 standard deviations below the mean for age and gender, which corresponds to the shortest 2.3% of individuals. In contrast, failure to thrive is usually defined in terms of weight, and can be evaluated either by a low weight for the child's age, or by a low rate of weight gain. A similar term, stunted growth, generally refers to reduced growth rate as a manifestation of malnutrition in early childhood.

=== Motor skills ===
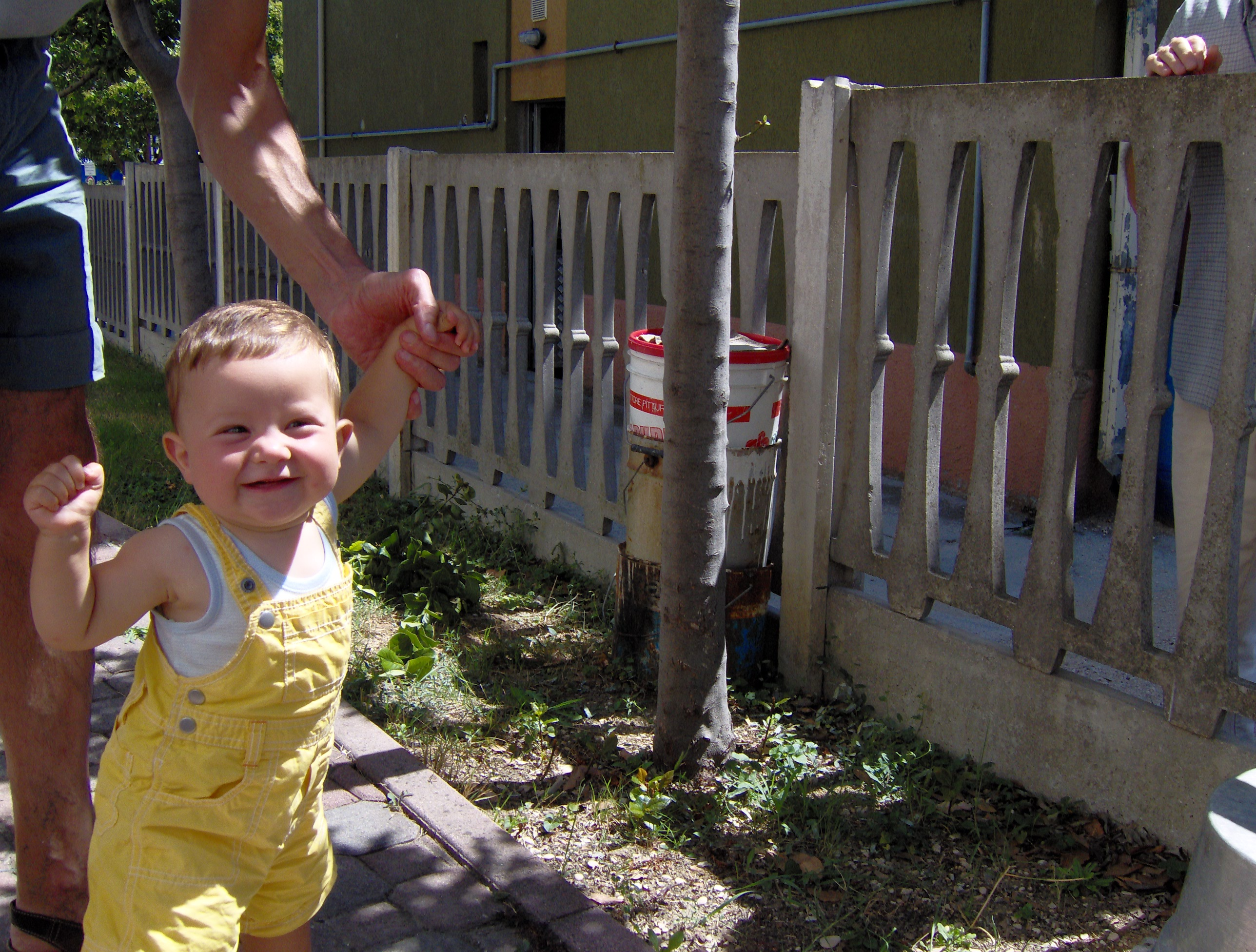
A child learning to walk

Physical abilities change through childhood from the largely reflexive (unlearned, involuntary) movement young infants to the highly skilled voluntary movements characteristic of later childhood and adolescence.

==== Definition ====
Motor learning refers to the increasing spatial and temporal accuracy of movements with practice". Motor skills can be divided into two categories: basic skills necessary for everyday life and recreational skills, including skills for employment or interest based skills.

==== Speed and pattern ====
The speed of motor development is rapid in early life, as many of the reflexes of the newborn alter or disappear within the first year, and slows later. Like physical growth, motor development shows predictable patterns of cephalocaudal (head to foot) and proximodistal (torso to extremities) development, with movements at the head and in the more central areas coming under control before those of the lower part of the body or the hands and feet. Movement ability develops in stage-like sequences, for example: locomotion at 6–8 months involves creeping on all fours, then proceeds to pulling to stand, "cruising" while holding on to an object, walking while holding an adult's hand, and finally walking independently. By middle childhood and adolescence, new motor skills are acquired by instruction or observation rather than in a predictable sequence. There are executive functions of the brain (working memory, timed inhibition and switching), which are generally considered essential to motor skills, though some argue the reverse dependence—that motor skills are actually precursors to executive function.

==== Mechanisms ====
The mechanisms involved in motor development involve some genetic components that determine aspects of muscle and bone strength, as well as the physical size of body parts at a given age. The main areas of the brain involved in motor skills are the frontal cortex, parietal cortex and basal ganglia. The dorsolateral frontal cortex is responsible for strategic processing, the parietal cortex is important in controlling perceptual-motor integration and the basal ganglia and supplementary motor cortex are responsible for motor sequences.

According to a study showing the relationship between coordination and limb growth in infants, genetic components have a huge impact on motor development. Intra-limb correlations, like the distance between hip and knee joints, were studied and proved to affect the way an infant will walk. There are also genetic factors like the tendency to use the left or right side of the body more (which allows for early prediction of the dominant hand early). Sample t-tests showed that, for female babies, there was a significant difference between the left and right sides at 18 weeks and that the right side was usually dominant. Some factors are biological constraints that we cannot control, like male infants tending to have larger and longer arms, yet have an influence on measures like when an infant's reach. Overall, there are both sociological and genetic factors that influence motor development.

Nutrition and exercise also determine strength, flexibility, and the ease and accuracy with which a body part can be moved. It has also been shown that the frontal lobe develops posterio-anteriorally (from back to front), which is significant in motor development because the hind portion of the frontal lobe is known to control motor functions. This form of development (known as "Proportional Development") explains why motor functions typically develop relatively quickly during childhood, while logic, which is controlled by the middle and front portions of the frontal lobe, usually will not develop until late childhood or early adolescence. Opportunities to carry out movements help establish the abilities to flex (move toward the trunk) and extend body parts; both capacities are necessary for good motor ability. Skilled voluntary movements such as passing objects from hand to hand develop as a result of practice and learning. Mastery Climates are autonomy-supportive climates that a teacher can adopt to as a suggested successful learning environment for children to promote and reinforce motor skills by their own motivation. This promotes participation and active learning in children, which Piaget's theory of cognitive development says is extremely important in early childhood.

==== Individual differences ====
Individual differences in motor ability are common and depend partly on the child's weight and build. Infants with smaller, slimmer, and more mature builds (proportionally) tend to crawl and crawl earlier than infants with larger builds. Infants with more motor experience have been shown to belly crawl and crawl sooner. Not all infants belly crawl; however, those who skip stage this are not as proficient in their ability to crawl on their hands and knees. After the infant period, individual differences are strongly affected by opportunities to practice, observe, and be instructed on specific movements. Atypical motor development such as persistent primitive reflexes beyond 4–6 months, or delayed walking may be an indication of developmental delays or conditions such as autism, cerebral palsy, or down syndrome. Lower motor coordination results in difficulties with speed accuracy and with trade-off in complex tasks. Encouraging children to participate in activities that cater to their unique personalities is an effective way to help them develop new skills and grow in different environments. Children can learn valuable discipline, dedication, and socialization lessons by challenging themselves to try new things. For example, a naturally shy child may benefit from participating in a drama club, where they can learn to express themselves confidently in front of others. Similarly, a naturally competitive child may thrive in a sports team where they can understand the value of teamwork and sportsmanship. By embracing their individual personalities and interests, children can develop into well-rounded, confident individuals with diverse skills and experiences. Organized sports can provide a child numerous opportunities to develop essential life skills, such as leadership and teamwork. By being a part of a team, a child can learn the value of working together towards a common goal and understand that individual success is not the sole focus. They can practice thinking beyond themselves and learn the importance of considering the needs of others. Through playing sports, children can develop a strong sense of responsibility, accountability, and respect for their teammates, coaches, and opponents. Overall, organized sports can offer a fun and enriching experience while helping children build character and valuable life skills they can carry into adulthood. Based on personal experience, working during adolescence provided an opportunity to develop time management skills and accountability. Balancing schoolwork and employment required effective time allocation and punctuality while being responsible enough to communicate with managers regarding school-related conflicts. These essential practices have influenced numerous people in how they are shaped in adulthood.

==== Children with disabilities ====
Children with Down syndrome or developmental coordination disorder are late to reach major motor skills milestones like sucking, grasping, rolling, sitting up and walking, talking. Children with Down syndrome sometimes have heart problems, frequent ear infections, hypotonia, or undeveloped muscle mass. Children can also be diagnosed with a learning disability, which are disabilities in any of the areas related to language, reading, and mathematics, with basic reading skills being the most common learning disability. The definition of a learning disability focuses on the difference between a child's academic achievement and their apparent capacity to learn.

==== Population differences ====
Regardless of the culture a baby is born into, they are born with a few core domains of knowledge which allow them to make sense of their environment and learn upon previous experience by using motor skills such as grasping or crawling. There are some population differences in motor development, with girls showing some advantages in small muscle usage, including articulation of sounds with lips and tongue. Ethnic differences in reflex movements of newborn infants have been reported, suggesting that some biological factor is at work. Cultural differences may encourage learning of motor skills like using the left hand only for sanitary purposes and the right hand for all other uses, producing a population difference. Cultural factors are play a role in practiced voluntary movements, such as the use of the foot to dribble a soccer ball or the hand to dribble a basketball.

== Mental and emotional aspects of development ==
=== Cognitive/intellectual ===
Cognitive development is primarily concerned with ways in which young children acquire, develop, and use internal mental capabilities such as problem-solving, memory, and language.

==== Mechanisms ====
Cognitive development has genetic and other biological mechanisms, as is seen in the many genetic causes of intellectual disability. Environmental factors including food and nutrition, the responsiveness of parents, love, daily experiences, and physical activity can influence early brain development of children. However, although it is assumed that the brain causes cognition, it is not yet possible to measure specific brain changes and show the cognitive changes they cause. Developmental advances in cognition are also related to experience and learning, especially for higher-level abilities like abstraction, which depend to a considerable extent on formal education.

==== Speed and pattern ====
The ability to learn temporal patterns in sequenced actions was investigated in elementary-school-age children. Temporal learning depends upon a process of integrating timing patterns with action sequences. Children ages 6–13 and young adults performed a serial response time task in which a response and a timing sequence were presented repeatedly in a phase-matched manner, allowing for integrative learning. The degree of integrative learning was measured as the slowing in performance that resulted when phase-shifting the sequences. Learning was similar for the children and adults on average but increased with age for the children. Executive function measured by Wisconsin Card Sorting Test (WCST) performance as well as a measure of response speed also improved with age. Finally, WCST performance and response speed predicted temporal learning. Taken together, the results indicate that temporal learning continues to develop in pre-adolescents and that maturing executive function or processing speed may play an important role in acquiring temporal patterns in sequenced actions and the development of this ability.

==== Individual differences ====
There are typical individual differences in the ages at which specific cognitive abilities are achieved, but schooling for children in industrialized countries is based on the assumption that there are no large differences. Delays in cognitive development are problematic for children in cultures that demand advanced cognitive skills for work and for independent living. Everyday cognitive skills include problem-solving, reasoning, and abstract thinking among many others. In the absence of these life skills, children may struggle to complete work in a timely manner or understand certain tasks they are asked to do. If a delay is noticed screenings can possibly find the source of the issue; if there is no underlying issue it is important to help aid the child by reading with them, playing games with them, or reaching out to professionals that can help.

==== Population differences ====
There are few population differences in cognitive development: boys and girls show some differences in their skills and preferences, but there is a great deal of overlap between them. Some differences are seen in fluid reasoning and visual processing, as until about the age of four girls outperform boys in tests of these skills, but by about six or seven boys and girls score similarly. This is also true of IQ tests where girls tend to outscore boys, but again, as they age the gap lessens. Differences in cognitive achievement between different ethnic groups appears to result from cultural or other environmental factors.

=== Social-emotional ===
==== Factor ====
Newborn infants do not seem to experience fear or have preferences for contact with any specific people. In the first few months they only experience happiness, sadness, and anger. A baby's first smile usually occurs between 6 and 10 weeks, as this usually occurs during social interactions it is called a "social smile". By about 8–12 months, they go through a fairly rapid change and become fearful of perceived threats. By around 6–36 months, infants begin to prefer familiar people and show anxiety and distress when separated from them, and when approached by strangers.

Separation anxiety is a typical stage of development to an extent. Kicking, screaming, and throwing temper tantrums are normal symptoms of separation anxiety. The level of intensity of these symptoms can help determine whether or not a child has separation anxiety disorder, which is when a child constantly and intensely refuses to separate from the parent.

The capacity for empathy and the understanding of social rules begin in the preschool period and continue to develop into adulthood. Middle childhood is characterized by friendships with age-mates, and adolescence by emotions connected with sexuality and the beginnings of romantic love. Anger seems most intense during the toddler and early preschool period, and during adolescence.

==== Speed and pattern ====
Some aspects of social-emotional development, like empathy, develop gradually, but others, like fearfulness, seem to involve a rather sudden reorganization of the child's experiences of emotion. Sexual and romantic emotions develop in connection with physical maturation.

==== Mechanisms ====
Genetic factors appear to regulate some of the social-emotional developments that occur at predictable ages, such as fearfulness and attachment to familiar people. Experience plays a role in determining which people are familiar, which social rules are obeyed, and how anger is expressed.

Parenting practices have been shown to predict children's emotional intelligence. The amount of time mothers spent with their children and the quality of their interactions are important in terms of children's trait emotional intelligence, not only because those times of joint activity reflect a more positive parenting, but because they are likely to promote modeling, reinforcement, shared attention, and social cooperation.

==== Population differences ====
Population differences may occur in older children, if, for example, they have learned that it is appropriate for boys to express emotion or behave differently than girls, or if customs learned by children of one ethnic group are different than those learned by another. Social and emotional differences between boys and girls of the same age may also be associated with the differences in the timing of puberty seen between the two sexes.

== Development of language and communication ==
=== Mechanisms ===
Language serves the purpose of communication to express oneself through a systematic and conventional use of sounds, signs, or written symbols. There are four subcomponents a child must know to acquire language competence: phonology, lexicon, morphology and syntax, and pragmatics. These subcomponents combine to form the components of language: sociolinguistics and literacy. Currently, there is no single accepted theory of language acquisition but various explanations of language development have been given.

=== Components ===
The four components of language development include:

- Phonology is concerned with the sounds of language. It is the function, behavior, and organization of sounds as linguistic items. Phonology considers what the sounds of language are and what the rules are for combining sounds. Phonological acquisition in children can be measured by frequency and accuracy of production of various vowels and consonants, the acquisition of phonemic contrasts and distinctive features, or by viewing development in regular stages and to characterizing systematic strategies they adopt.
- Lexicon is similar to vocabulary as they both describe the complex dictionary of words used in speech production and comprehension. The lexicon of a language also includes that language's morphemes. Morphemes act as minimal meaning-bearing elements or building blocks of something in language that makes sense. For example, in the word "cat", the component "cat" makes sense as does "at", but "at" does not mean the same thing as "cat". In this example, "ca" does not mean anything.
- Morphology is the study of words and how they are formed. Morphology is also the branch of linguistics that deals with words, their internal structure and how they are formed. It is also the mental system involved in word formation.
- Pragmatics is the study of the relationship between linguistic forms and speakers of the language, it also incorporates how speech is used to serve different functions. Pragmatics can be defined as the ability to communicate one's feelings and desires to others.

Children's development of language also includes semantics which is the attachment of meaning to words. This happens in three stages. First, each word means an entire sentence. For example, a young child may say "mama" but the child may mean "Here is Mama", "Where is Mama?", or "I see Mama." In the second stage, words have meaning but do not have complete definitions. This stage occurs around age two or three. Third, around age seven or eight, words have adult-like definitions and their meanings are more complete.

A child learns the syntax of their language when they are able to join words together into sentences and understand multiple-word sentences said by other people. There appear to be six major stages in which a child's acquisition of syntax develops. First, is the use of sentence-like words in which the child communicates using one word with additional vocal and bodily cues. This stage usually occurs between 12 and 18 months of age. Second, between 18 months to two years, there is the modification stage where children communicate concepts by modifying a topic word. The third stage, between two and three years old, involves the child using complete subject-predicate structures to communicate concepts. Fourth, children make changes on basic sentence structure that enables them to communicate more complex concepts. This stage occurs between the ages of two and a half years to four years. The fifth stage of categorization involves children aged three and a half to seven years refining their sentences with more purposeful word choice that reflects their complex system of categorizing word types. Finally, children use structures of language that involve more complicated syntactic relationships between the ages of five years old to ten years old.

=== Sequential skills and milestones ===
Sequential skills in learning to talk
Child Age in Months	Language Skill
0–3	Vocal play: cry, coo, gurgle, grunt
3+	Babble: undifferentiated sounds
6–10	Babble: canonical/reduplicated syllables
9+	Imitation
8–18	First words
13–15	Expressive jargon, intonational sentences
13–19	10-word vocabulary
14–24	50-word vocabulary
13–27	Single-word stage and a few sentences; 2–3 word combinations; Articles: a/the; Plural: -s
23–24	Irregular past: went, modal and verb: can/will; 28 to 436-word vocabulary; 93–265 utterances per hour
25–27	Regular past: -ed; Auxiliary "be": -'m, -'s
23–26	Third-person singular: -s; 896 to 1,507-word vocabulary; 1,500 to 1,700 words per hour

Infants begin with cooing and soft vowel sounds. Shortly after birth, this system is developed as the infants begin to understand that their noises, or non-verbal communication, lead to a response from their caregiver. This will then progress into babbling around 5 months of age, with infants first babbling consonant and vowel sounds together that may sound like "ma" or "da". At around 8 months of age, babbling increases to include repetition of sounds, such as "ma-ma" and "da-da". Around this age infants also learn the forms for words and which sounds are more likely to follow other sounds. At this stage, much of the child's communication is open to interpretation. For example, if a child says "bah" when they are in a toy room with their guardian, it is likely to be interpreted as "ball" because the toy is in sight. However, if you were to listen to the same 'word' on a recorded tape without knowing the context, one might not be able to figure out what the child was trying to say.

A child's receptive language, the understanding of others' speech, has a gradual development beginning at about 6 months. However, expressive language, the production of words, moves rapidly after its beginning at about a year of age, with a "vocabulary explosion" of rapid word acquisition occurring in the middle of the second year. Grammatical rules and word combinations appear at about age two. Between 20 and 28 months, children move from understanding the difference between high and low, hot and cold and begin to change "no" to "wait a minute", "not now" and "why". Eventually, they are able to add pronouns to words and combine them to form short sentences. Mastery of vocabulary and grammar continue gradually through the preschool and school years, with adolescents having smaller vocabularies than adults and experiencing more difficulty with constructions such as the passive voice.

By age 1, children are able to say 1–2 words, respond to their name, imitate familiar sounds and follow simple instructions. Between 1–2 years old, the child uses 5–20 words, says 2-word sentences, expresses their wishes by saying words like "more" or "up", and understands the word "no". Between 2 and 3 years of age, the child is able to refer to themself as "me", combine nouns and verbs, use short sentences, use some simple plurals, answer "where" questions, and has a vocabulary of about 450 words. By age 4, children are able to use sentences of 4–5 words and have a vocabulary of about 1000 words. Children between the ages of 4 and 5 years old are able to use past tense, have a vocabulary of about 1,500 words, and ask questions like "why?" and "who?". By age 6, the child has a vocabulary of 2,600 words, is able to form sentences of 5–6 words and use a variety of different types of sentences. By the age of 5 or 6 years old, the majority of children have mastered the basics of their native language.

Infants, up to 15 month-olds, are initially unable to understand familiar words in their native language pronounced using an unfamiliar accent. This means that a Canadian-English speaking infant cannot recognize familiar words pronounced with an Australian-English accent. This skill develops close to their second birthday. However, this can be overcome when a highly familiar story is read in the new accent prior to the test, suggesting the essential functions of underlying spoken language is in place earlier than previously thought.

Vocabulary typically grows from about 20 words at 18 months to around 200 words at 21 months. Starting around 18 months the child begins to combine words into two-word sentences, which the adult typically expands to clarify its meaning. By 24–27 months the child is producing three or four-word sentences using a logical, if not strictly correct, syntax. The theory is that children apply a basic set of rules such as adding 's' for plurals or inventing simpler words out of words too complicated to repeat like "choskit" for chocolate biscuit. Following this there is a rapid appearance of grammatical rules and ordering of sentences. There is often an interest in rhyme, and imaginative play frequently includes conversations. Children's recorded monologues give insight into the development of the process of organizing information into meaningful units.

By age three the child begins to use complex sentences, including relative clauses, although they are still perfecting various linguistic systems. By five years of age the child's use of language is very similar to that of an adult. From the age of about three children can indicate fantasy or make-believe linguistics, produce coherent personal stories and fictional narratives with beginnings and endings. It is argued that children devise narrative as a way of understanding their own experience and as a medium for communicating their meaning to others.

The ability to engage in extended discourse emerges over time from regular conversation with adults and peers. For this, a child needs to learn to combine their perspective with that of others and with outside events and learn to use linguistic indicators to show they are doing this. They also learn to adjust their language depending on who they are speaking to. Typically by the age of about 9 a child can recount other narratives in addition to their own experiences, from the perspectives of the author, the characters in the story and their own views.

=== Theories ===
Although the role of adult speech is important in facilitating the child's learning, there is considerable disagreement among theorists about the extent to which it influences children's early meanings and expressive words. Findings about the initial mapping of new words, the ability to decontextualize words, and refine meaning of words are diverse. One hypothesis, known as the syntactic bootstrapping hypothesis, refers to the child's ability to infer meaning from cues by using grammatical information from the structure of sentences.

Another theory is the multi-route model which argues that context-bound words and referential words follow different routes; the first being mapped onto event representations and the latter onto mental representations. In this model, parental input has a critical role but the children ultimately rely on cognitive processing to establish subsequent use of words. However, naturalistic research on language development has indicated that preschoolers' vocabularies are strongly associated with the number of words said to them by adults.

There is no single accepted theory of language acquisition. Instead, there are current theories that help to explain theories of language, theories of cognition, and theories of development. They include the generativist theory, social interactionist theory, usage-based theory (Tomasello), connectionist theory, and behaviorist theory (Skinner). Generativist theories say that universal grammar is innate and language experience activates that innate knowledge. Social interactionist theories define language as a social phenomenon where children acquire language because they want to communicate with others; this theory is heavily based on social-cognitive abilities that drive the language acquisition process. Usage-based theories define language as a set of formulas that emerge from the child's learning abilities in correlation with their social cognitive interpretation and their understanding of the speakers' intended meanings. Connectionist theory is a pattern-learning procedure that defines language as a system composed of smaller subsystems or patterns of sound or meaning. Behaviorist theories defined language as the establishment of positive reinforcement, but are now regarded as only being of historical interest.

=== Communication ===
Communication can be defined as the exchange and negotiation of information between two or more individuals through verbal and nonverbal symbols, oral and written (or visual) modes, and the production and comprehension processes of communication. According to First International Congress for the Study of Child Language, "the general hypothesis [is that] access to social interaction is a prerequisite to normal language acquisition". Principles of conversation include two or more people focusing on one topic. All questions in a conversation should be answered, comments should be understood or acknowledged and any directions should, in theory, be followed. In the case of young children these conversations are expected to be basic or redundant. The role of a guardians during developing stages is to convey that conversation is meant to have a purpose, as well as teaching children to recognize the other speaker's emotions.

Communicative language is both verbal and nonverbal, and to achieve communication competence, four components must be mastered. These components are: grammatical competence, including vocabulary knowledge, rules of word sentence formation, etc.; sociolinguistic competence, or the appropriate meanings and grammatical forms in different social contexts; discourse competence, which is having the knowledge required to combine forms and meanings; and strategic competence in the form of knowledge about verbal and nonverbal communication strategies. The attainment of communicative competence is an essential part of actual communication.

Language development is viewed as a motive to communication, and the communicative function of language in-turn provides the motive for language development. Jean Piaget uses the term "acted conversations" to explain a child's style of communication that relies more heavily on gestures and body movements than words. Younger children depend on gestures for a direct statement of their message. As they begin to acquire more language, body movements take on a different role and begin to complement the verbal message. These nonverbal bodily movements allow children to express their emotions before they can express them verbally. The child's nonverbal communication of how they are feeling is seen in babies 0 to 3 months who use wild, jerky movements of the body to show excitement or distress. This develops to more rhythmic movements of the entire body at 3 to 5 months to demonstrate the child's anger or delight. Between 9–12 months of age, children view themselves as joining the communicative world.

Before 9–12 months, babies interact with objects and interact with people, but they do not interact with people about objects. This developmental change is the change from primary intersubjectivity (capacity to share oneself with others) to secondary intersubjectivity (capacity to share one's experience), which changes the infant from an unsociable to socially engaging creature. Around 12 months of age the use of communicative gestures begins, including communicative pointing where an infant points to request something, or to point to provide information. Another communicative gesture presents around the age of 10 and 11 months where infants start gaze-following, by looking where another person is looking. This joint attention results in changes to their social cognitive skills between the ages of 9 and 15 months as their time is increasingly spent with others. Children's use of non-verbal communicative gestures predicts future language development. The use of non-verbal communication in the form of gestures indicate the child's interest in communication development, and the meanings they choose to convey that are soon revealed through the verbalization of language.

Language acquisition and development contribute to the verbal form of communication. Children originate with a linguistic system where the words they learn are the words used for functional meaning. This instigation of speech has been termed pragmatic bootstrapping. According to this theory children view words as a means of social connection, in that words are used to connect the communicative intentions of the speaker to new words. Hence, the competence of verbal communication through language is achieved by gains in syntax or grammar.

Another function of communicating through language is related to pragmatic development. Pragmatic development includes the child's intentions of communication before they knows how to express these intentions, and throughout the first few years of life both language and communicative functions develop.

When children acquire language and learn to use language for communicative functions (pragmatics), children also gain knowledge about how to participate in conversations and how to relay past experiences/events (discourse knowledge), as well as learning how to use language appropriately for their social situation or social group (sociolinguistic knowledge).

Within the first two years of life, a child's language ability progresses and conversational skills, such as the mechanics of verbal interaction, develop. Mechanics of verbal interaction include taking turns, initiating topics, repairing miscommunication, and responding to lengthen or sustain the conversation.

Conversation is asymmetrical when a child interacts with an adult because the adult is the one to create structure in the conversation, and to build upon the child's contributions. In accordance to the child's developing conversational skills, asymmetrical conversation between adult and child advance to an equal temperament of conversation. This shift in balance of conversation suggests a development of narrative discourse in communication. Ordinarily, the development of communicative competence and the development of language are linked to one another.

=== Causes of delays ===
==== Individual differences ====
Delays in language skills are the most frequent type of developmental delay. According to demographics 1 out of 6 children have a significant language delay; speech/language delay is three to four times more common in boys than in girls. Some children also display behavioral problems due to their frustration of not being able to express what they want or need.

Simple speech delays are usually temporary. Most cases are solved on their own or with a little extra attention from the family. It is the parent's duty to encourage their baby to talk to them with gestures or sounds and for them to spend a great amount of time playing with, reading to, and communicating with their baby. In certain circumstances, parents will have to seek professional help, such as a speech therapist.

It is important to take into consideration that sometimes delays can be a warning sign of more serious conditions that could include auditory processing disorders, hearing loss, developmental verbal dyspraxia, developmental delay in other areas, or an autism spectrum disorder (ASD).

==== Environmental causes ====
There are many environmental causes that are linked to language delays, including situations where the child has their full attention on another skill, such as walking. The child may have a twin or a sibling close to their own age and may not be receiving the parent's full attention. Another possibility is that the child is in a daycare with too few adults to administer individual attention. General development can be impacted if the child does not receive an adequately nutritional diet. Perhaps the most obvious environmental cause would be a child that suffers from psychosocial deprivation such as poverty, poor housing, neglect, inadequate linguistic stimulation, or emotional stress.

==== Neurological causes ====
Language delay can be caused by a substantial number of underlying disorders, such as intellectual disability, which accounts for more than 50 percent of language delays. Language delay is usually more severe than other developmental delays in intellectually disabled children, and it is usually the first obvious symptom of intellectual disability. Intellectual disability causes global language delay, including delayed auditory comprehension and delayed use of gestures.

Impaired hearing is another of the most common causes of language delay. A child who can not hear or process speech in a clear and consistent manner will have a language delay, and even the most minimum hearing impairment or auditory processing deficit can considerably affect language development. Generally the more the severe the impairment, the more serious the language delay. Nonetheless, deaf children that are born to families who use sign language develop infant babble and use a fully expressive sign language at the same pace as hearing children.

Developmental Dyslexia is a developmental reading disorder that occurs when the brain does not properly recognize and process the graphic symbols that represent the sounds of speech. Children with dyslexia may encounter problems in rhyming and separating the sounds that compose words, which is essential in learning to read as early reading skills rely heavily on word recognition. When using an alphabet writing system this involves in having the ability to separate out the sounds in words and be able to match them with letter and groups of letters. Difficulty connecting the sounds of language to the letters of words may result difficulty in understanding sentences. Confusion between similar letters, such as "b" and "d" can occur. In general the symptoms of dyslexia are: difficulty in determining the meaning of a simple sentence, learning to recognize written words, and difficulty in rhyming.

Autism and speech delay are usually correlated. Problems with verbal language is the most common sign of autism. Early diagnosis and treatment of autism can significantly help the child improve their speech skills. Autism is recognized as one of the five pervasive developmental disorders, distinguished by problems with language, speech, communication and social skills that present in early childhood. Some common types of language disorders are having limited to no verbal speech, echolalia or repeating words out of context, problems responding to verbal instruction and ignoring people who speak to them directly.

== Other aspects of development ==
=== Gender ===
Gender identity involves how a person perceives themselves as male, female, or a variation of the two. Children can identify themselves as belonging to a certain gender as early as two years old, but how gender identity is developed is a topic of scientific debate. Several factors are involved in determining an individual's gender, including neonatal hormones, postnatal socialization, and genetic influences. Some believe that gender is malleable until late childhood, while others argue that gender is established early and gender-typed socialization patterns either reinforce or soften the individual's notion of gender. Since most people identify as the gender that is typically associated to their genitalia, studying the impact of these factors is difficult.

Evidence suggests that neonatal androgens, male sex hormones produced in the womb during gestation, play an important role. Testosterone in the womb directly codes the brain for either male or female-typical development. This includes both the physical structure of the brain and the characteristics the person expresses because of it. People exposed to high levels of testosterone during gestation typically develop a male gender identity, while those not exposed to testosterone, or who lack the receptors necessary to interact with it, typically develop a female gender identity.

An individual's genes are also thought to interact with the hormones during gestation and, in turn, affect gender identity, but the genes responsible for this and their effects have not been precisely documented and evidence is limited. It is unknown whether socialization plays a part in determining gender identity postnatally. It is well documented that children actively seek out information on how to properly interact with others based on their gender, but the extent to which these role models, which can include parents, friends, and TV characters, influence gender identity is less clear and no consensus has been reached.

=== Race ===
In addition to the course of development, previous literature has looked at how race, ethnicity, and socioeconomic status has affected child development. Some studies seem to speak to the importance of adult supervision of adolescent youth. Literature suggested that African American child development was sometimes differentiated between cultural socialization and racial socialization. Further, a different study found that most immigrant youth choose majors focusing on the fields of science and math.

== Risk factors ==
Risk factors in child development include: malnutrition, maternal depression, maternal substance use and pain in infancy; though many more factors have been studied.

=== Pain ===
The prevention and alleviation of pain in neonates, particularly preterm infants, is important not only because it is ethical but also because exposure to repeated painful stimuli early in life is known to have short- and long-term adverse sequelae. These sequelae include physiologic instability, altered brain development, and abnormal neurodevelopment, somatosensory, and stress response systems, which can persist into childhood.^{5,–15} Nociceptive pathways are active and functional as early as 25 weeks' gestation and may elicit a generalized or exaggerated response to noxious stimuli in immature newborn infants.^{16}

American Academy of Pediatrics February 2016 Policy Statement, reaffirmed July 2020

=== Postnatal depression ===
Although there are a large number of studies regarding the effect of maternal depression and postnatal depression on various areas of infant development, they are yet to come to a consensus regarding the true effects. Numerous studies indicate impaired development, while many others find no effect of depression on development.

A study of 18-month-olds whose mothers had depressive symptoms while the children were 6 weeks and/or 6 months old found that maternal depression had no effect on the child's cognitive development. Furthermore, the study indicates that maternal depression combined with a poor home environment is more likely to have an effect on cognitive development than maternal depression alone. However, the authors conclude that it may be that short term depression has no effect, but long term depression could cause more serious problems.

A longitudinal study spanning 7 years found no effect of maternal depression on cognitive development as a whole, however it found that boys are more susceptible to cognitive developmental issues when their mothers had depression.

This trend is continued in a study of children up to 2 years old, which revealed a significant difference on cognitive development between genders, with girls having a higher score; however girls scored higher regardless of the mother's history of depression. Infants with chronically depressed mothers showed significantly lower scores on the motor and mental scales within the Bayley Scales of Infant Development, contrasting with many older studies.

A similar effect has been found at 11 years: male children of depressed mothers score an average of 19.4 points lower on an IQ test than peers with healthy mothers, while this difference is less pronounced in girls. Three month olds with depressed mothers show significantly lower scores on the Griffiths Mental Development Scale, which covers a range of developmental areas including cognitive, motor and social development. Furthermore, interactions between depressed mothers and their children may affect social and cognitive abilities in later life.

Maternal depression has been shown to influence the mothers' interaction with her child. When communicating with their child, depressed mothers fail to make changes to their vocal intonation, and tend to use unstructured vocal behaviours. Furthermore, compared to when interacting with healthy mothers, infants interacting with depressed mothers show signs of stress, such as increased pulse and raised cortisol levels, and make more use of avoidance behaviours, for example looking away. Mother-infant interaction at 2 months has been shown to affect the child's cognitive performance at 5 years.

Studies have begun to show that other forms of psychopathology (mental illness) can independently influence infants' and toddlers' subsequent social-emotional development through effects on regulatory processes within the child-parent attachment. Maternal interpersonal violence-related post-traumatic stress disorder (PTSD), for example, has been associated with subsequent dysregulation of emotion and aggression by ages 4–7 years.

=== Maternal drug use ===
==== Cocaine ====
Research has provided conflicting evidence regarding the severity of effects on children's development posed by maternal substance use during and after pregnancy. Children exposed to cocaine in utero weigh less than those not exposed at ages ranging from 6 to 30 months. Additionally, studies indicate that the head circumference of children exposed to cocaine is lower than those that of children without cocaine exposure. However, two more recent studies found no significant differences in either measure between those exposed to cocaine and those who were not.

Maternal cocaine use may also affect the child's cognitive development, with exposed children achieving lower scores on measures of psychomotor and mental development. Again though, there is conflicting evidence, and a number of studies indicate no effect of maternal cocaine use on a child's cognitive development.

Continuing the trend, some studies found maternal cocaine use to impair motor development, while others showed no effect of cocaine use on motor development.

==== Other ====
The use of cocaine by pregnant women is not the only drug that can have a negative effect on the fetus. Tobacco, marijuana, and opiates can also affect an unborn child's cognitive and behavioral development.

Smoking tobacco increases pregnancy complications including low birth weight, prematurity, placental abruption, and intrauterine death. After birth it can disturb maternal-infant interactions, reduce IQ, increase the risk of ADHD, and lead to tobacco use in the child.

Prenatal marijuana exposure may have long-term emotional and behavioral consequences, as at ten-years-old children who had been exposed to the drug during pregnancy reported more depressive symptoms than unexposed peers. Some other effects include executive function impairment, reading difficulty, and delayed emotional regulation.

An opiate drug, such as heroin, in utero decreases birth weight, birth length, and head circumference. Parental opiate exposure may impact the infant's central nervous system and autonomic nervous system, though the evidence is even more inconsistent than with parental cocaine exposure. There are also some unexpected negative consequences on a child, such as: less rhythmic swallowing, strabismus, and feelings of rejection.

=== Malnutrition and undernutrition ===
Poor nutrition early in life contributes to stunting, and by the age of two or three can be associated with cognitive deficits, poor school achievement, and, later in life, poor social relationships. Malnutrition is a large problem in developing nations, and has an important effect on young children's weight and height. Children suffering malnutrition in Colombia weighed less than those living in upper class conditions at the age of 36 months (11.88 kg [26.2 lb] compared to 14 kg [31 lb]), and were shorter (85.3 cm [33.6 in] versus 94 cm [37 in]).

Malnutrition during the first 1000 days of a child's life can cause irreversible physical and mental stunting. Infections and parasites related to poor sanitation and hygiene can impact absorption of nutrients in the gut. Adequate sanitation and hygiene (rather than just access to food) play a critical role in preventing undernutrition, malnutrition and stunting and ensuring normal early childhood development. Malnutrition has been indicated as a negative influence on childhood intelligence quotient (IQ). Although it has also been suggested that this effect is nullified when parental IQ is considered, implying that this difference is genetic.

==== Specific nutrients ====
The effect of low iron levels on cognitive development and IQ has yet to reach consensus. Some evidence suggests that even well-nourished children with lower levels of iron and folate (although not at such a level to be considered deficient) have a lower IQ than those with higher levels of iron and folate. Furthermore, anaemic children perform worse on cognitive measures than non-anaemic children.

Other nutrients have been strongly implicated in brain development, including iodine and zinc. Iodine is required for the formation of thyroid hormones necessary for brain development. Iodine deficiency may reduce IQ by an average of 13.5 points compared to healthy individual. Zinc deficiency has also been shown to slow childhood growth and development. Zinc supplementation appears to be beneficial for growth in infants under six months old.

=== Socioeconomic status ===
Socioeconomic status is measured primarily based on income, educational attainment and occupation. Investigations into the role of socioeconomic factors on child development repeatedly show that continual poverty is more harmful on IQ, and cognitive abilities than short-term poverty.

Children in families who experience persistent financial hardships and poverty have significantly impaired cognitive abilities compared to those in families who do not face these issues. Poverty can also cause a number of other factors shown to effect child development, such as poor academic success, less family involvement, iron deficiency, infections, a lack of stimulation, and malnutrition. Poverty also increases the risk of lead poisoning due to lead paint found on the walls of some houses; child blood levels of lead increase as income decreases. Income based poverty is associated with a 6–13 point reduction in IQ for those earning half of the poverty threshold compared to those earning twice the poverty threshold, and children coming from households featuring continual or temporary poverty perform lower than children in middle-class families.

Parental educational attainment is the most significant socioeconomic factor in predicting the child's cognitive abilities, as those with a mother with a high IQ are likely to have higher IQs themselves. Similarly, maternal occupation is associated with better cognitive achievement. Those whose mothers' job entails problem-solving are more likely to be given stimulating tasks and games, and are likely to achieve more advanced verbal competency.

On the other hand, maternal employment is associated with slightly lower test scores, regardless of socioeconomic status. Counterintuitively, maternal employment results in more disadvantages the higher the socioeconomic status, as these children are being removed from a more enriching environment to be put in child care, though the quality of the child care must be considered. Low income children tend to be cared for by grandparents or extended family and therefore form strong bonds with family. High income children tend to be cared for in a child care setting or in home care such as with a nanny. If the mother is highly educated, this can be a disadvantage to the child.

Even with quality of care controlled for, studies still found that full-time work within the first year was correlated with negative effects on child development. Children whose mothers work are also less likely to receive regular well-baby doctor visits and less likely to be breastfed, which has been proven to improve developmental results. Effects are felt more strongly when women resume full-time work within the first year of the child's life. These effects may be due in part to pre-existing differences between mothers who return to work and those who do not, such as differences in character or reason for returning to work.

Low-income families are less likely to provide a stimulating home learning environment to their children due to time constraints and financial stress. Compared to two-parent households, children with a single-parent households have greater economic vulnerability and less parental involvement, leading to worse social, behavioral, educational, or cognitive outcomes.

A child's academic achievement is influenced by parents' educational attainment, parenting style, and parental investment in their child's cognitive and educational success. Higher-income families are able to afford learning opportunities both inside and outside the classroom. Poverty-stricken children have fewer opportunities for stimulating recreational activities, often missing out on trips to libraries or museums, and are unable to access a tutor to help with problematic academic areas.

A further factor in a child's educational attainment involves the school environment, more specifically teacher expectations and attitudes. If teachers perceive low-SES children as being less academically able then they may provide them with less attention and reinforcement. On the other hand, when schools make an effort to increase family and school involvement, children perform better on state tests.

=== Parasites ===
Diarrhea caused by the parasitic disease Giardiasis is associated with lower IQ. Parasitic worms (helminths) are associated with nutritional deficiencies known to be a risk to child development. Intestinal parasitism is one of the most neglected tropical diseases in the developed world, and harboring of this parasite could have several health implications in children that negatively affect childhood development and morbidity. Prolonged exposure to faecally-transmitted infections, including environmental enteropathy, other intestinal infections, and parasites during early childhood can lead to irreversible stunting. Reducing the prevalence of these parasites can be a benefit in child growth, development, and educational outcome.

=== Toxin exposure ===
High levels of lead in the blood is associated with attention deficits, while arsenic poisoning has a negative effect on both verbal IQ and on total intelligence quotient. Manganese poisoning due to levels in drinking water is also associated with a reduced IQ of 6.2 points between the highest and lowest level of poisoning.

Prenatal exposure to various pesticides including organophosphates, and chlorpyrifos has also been linked to reduced IQ score. Organophosphates have been specifically linked to poorer working memory, verbal comprehension, perceptual reasoning and processing speed.

=== Other ===
Intrauterine growth restriction is associated with learning deficits in childhood, and as such, is related to lower IQ. Cognitive development can also be harmed by childhood exposure to violence and trauma, including spousal abuse between the parents and sexual abuse.

== Neglect ==
When a child is unable to meet their developmental goals because they have not been provided with the correct amount of care, stimulation or nutrition this situation is commonly referred to as child neglect. It is the most widespread form of child abuse, accounting for 78% of all child abuse cases in the United States in 2010 alone. Scientific studies show that child neglect can have lifelong consequences for children.

=== Assessing and identifying ===
Assessing and identifying neglect pose a number of challenges for practitioners. Given that neglect is a dynamic between the child's development and levels of nurturance, the question in identifying neglect, becomes one of where do you start, with the child's development or with the levels of nurturance?

==== Development focused methods ====
Some professionals identify neglect by measuring the developmental levels of a child, as if those levels are normal, one can, by definition, conclude that a child is not being neglected. Measured areas of development can include weight, height, stamina, social and emotional responses, speech and motor development. As all these features go into making a medical assessment of whether a child is thriving, a professional looking to start an assessment of neglect might start with information collected by a doctor.

Infants are often weighed and measured when seen by their pediatrician for well-baby check-ups. The physician initiates a more complete evaluation when the infant's development and functioning are found to be delayed. Then social work staff could consult medical notes to establish if the baby or child is failing to thrive, as a first step in a pathway towards identifying neglect. If developmental levels are below normal, the identification of neglect then requires the professional to establish if this can be put down to the level of nurturance experienced by the child. Developmental delays caused by genetic conditions or disease need to be discounted, as they do not have their basis in a lack of nurturance.

=== Starting the assessment ===
Besides routine pediatrician visits, another way of starting the process of identifying neglect is to determine if the child is experiencing a level of nurturance lower than that considered necessary to support normal development, which might be unique to the child's age, gender and other factors. Exactly how to ascertain what a particular child needs, without referring back to their level of development, is not something theory and policy on neglect is clear about. Furthermore, determining whether a child is getting the requisite level of nurturance needs to take into account not just the intensity of the nurturance, but also the duration and frequency of the nurturance.

Children may experience varying and low levels of certain types of nurturance across a day and from time to time, however, the levels of nurturance should never cross thresholds of intensity, duration and frequency. For this reason, professionals must keep detailed histories of care provision, which demonstrate the duration of subnormal exposure to care, stimulation, and nutrition.

Common guidance suggests professionals should focus on the levels of nurturance provided by the carers of the child, as neglect is understood as an issue of the parents' behaviour towards the child. Some authors feel that establishing the failure of parents and caregivers to provide care is sufficient to conclude that neglect is occurring. One definition is that, "a child experiences neglect when the adults who look after them fail to meet their needs", which clearly defines neglect as a matter of parental performance.

This raises the question about what level of nurturance a carer or parent needs to fall under to provoke developmental delay, and how one goes about measuring that accurately. This definition, which focuses on the stimulation provided by the carer, can be subject to critique. Neglect is about the child's development being adversely affected by the levels of nurturance, but the carers' provision of nurturance is not always a good indicator of the level of nurturance received by the child. Neglect may be occurring at school, outside of parental care. The child may be receiving nurturance from siblings or through a boarding school education, which compensates for the lack of nurturance provided by the parents.

=== Linking to stimulation ===
Neglect is a process whereby children experience developmental delay owing to experiencing insufficient levels of nurturance. In practice, this means that when starting an assessment of neglect by identifying developmental delay one needs to then check the levels of nurturance received by the child. While some guidance on identifying neglect urges practitioners to measure developmental levels, other guidance focuses on how developmental levels can be attributed to parental behaviour. However, the narrow focus on parental behaviour can be criticised for unnecessarily ruling out the possible effect of institutionalised neglect, e.g. neglect at school.

If one starts by concluding that the levels of nurture received by the child are insufficient, one then needs to consider the developmental levels achieved by the child. Further challenges arise, however, as even when one has established developmental delay and exposure to low levels of nurture, one needs to rule out the possibility that the link between the two is coincidental. The developmental delay may be caused by a genetic disorder, disease or physical, sexual or emotional abuse. The developmental delay may be caused by a mixture of underexposure to nurture, abuse, genetics, and disease.

=== Measuring tools ===
The Graded Care Profile Tool is a practice tool which gives an objective measure of the quality of care in terms of a parent/carer's commitment. It was developed in the UK.

The North Carolina Family Assessment Scale is a tool that can be used by a practitioner to explore whether neglect is taking place across a range of family functioning areas.

=== Intervention programs ===
Early intervention programs and treatments include individual counselling, family and group counselling, social support services, behavioural skills training programs to eliminate problematic behaviour and teach parents appropriate parenting behaviour.

Video interaction guidance is a video feedback intervention through which a "guider" helps a client to enhance communication within relationships. The client is guided to analyse and reflect on video clips of their own interactions. Video Interaction Guidance has been used where concerns have been expressed over possible parental neglect in cases where the focus child is aged 2–12, and where the child is not the subject of a child protection plan.

The SafeCare programme is a preventive programme working with parents of children under 6 years old who are at risk of significant harm through neglect. The programme is delivered in the home by trained practitioners, and is 18 to 20 sessions focused on 3 key areas: parent-infant/child interaction, home safety and child health.

Triple P (Parenting Program) is a positive parenting program. It is a multilevel parenting and family support strategy. The idea behind it is that if parents are educated on proper parenting and given the appropriate resources, it could help decrease the number of child neglect cases.

== See also ==
- Attachment theory
- Birth order
- Cognitive model § Mother-fetus cognitive model
- Child development stages
- Child life specialist
- Child prodigy
- Clinical social work
- Critical period
- Developmental psychology
- Developmental psychobiology
- Developmental psychopathology
- Early childhood education
- Evolutionary developmental psychology
- Pedagogy
- Play
- Psychoanalytic infant observation
- Child development in Africa
- Child development in India
