= Child neglect =

Form of child abuse

Child neglect is an act of caregivers (e.g., parents) that results in depriving a child of their basic needs, such as the failure to provide adequate nutrition, supervision, health care, clothing, or housing, as well as other physical, emotional, social, educational, and safety needs. All societies have established that there are necessary behaviours a caregiver must provide for a child to develop physically, socially, and emotionally. Causes of neglect may result from several parenting problems including mental disorders, unplanned pregnancy, substance use disorder, unemployment, over employment, domestic violence, and, in special cases, poverty.

Child neglect depends on how a child and society perceive the caregiver's behaviour; it is not how parents believe they are behaving toward their child. Parental failure to provide for a child, when options are available, is different from failure to provide when options are not available. Poverty and lack of resources are often contributing factors and can prevent parents from meeting their children's needs when they otherwise would. The circumstances and intentionality must be examined before defining behaviour as neglectful.

Child neglect is the most prevalent form of child abuse. Neglected children are at risk of developing lifelong social, emotional and health problems, particularly if neglected before the age of two years.

== Definition ==
Neglect is difficult to define since there are no clear, cross-cultural standards for desirable or minimally adequate child-rearing practices. Research shows that neglect often coexists with other forms of abuse and adversity. While neglect generally refers to the absence of parental care and the chronic failure to meet children's basic needs, defining those needs has not been straightforward. In "Working Together", the Department for Education and Skills (United Kingdom) defined neglect in 2006 as:

...the persistent failure to meet a child's basic physical and/or psychological needs, likely to result in the serious impairment of the child's health or development. Neglect may occur during pregnancy as a result of maternal substance use disorders. Once a child is born, neglect may involve a parent or carer failing to provide adequate food, clothing and shelter (including exclusion from home or abandonment); protect a child from physical and emotional harm or danger; ensure adequate supervision (including the use of inadequate care-givers), or ensure access to appropriate medical care or treatment. It may also include neglect of, or unresponsiveness to, a child's basic emotional needs.

Child neglect is commonly defined as a failure by a child's caregiver to meet a child's physical, emotional, educational, or medical needs. Forms of child neglect include:

- Allowing the child to witness violence or severe abuse between parents or adults
- Insulting the child or threatening the child with violence
- Not providing the child with a safe environment and adult emotional support
- Ignoring the child
- Showing reckless disregard for the child's well-being

Other definitions of child neglect are:

- "The failure of a person responsible for a child's care and upbringing to safeguard the child's emotional and physical health and general well-being." — Webster's New World Law Dictionary
- "Acts of omission: failure to provide for a child's basic physical, emotional, or educational needs or to protect a child from harm or potential harm. [...] harm to a child may or may not be the intended consequence. Failure to provide [results in] physical neglect, emotional neglect, medical/dental neglect, and educational neglect. The failure to supervise [results in] inadequate supervision, exposure to violent environments." — Centers for Disease Control and Prevention
- "The persistent failure to meet a child's basic physical and/or psychological needs resulting in serious impairment of health and/or development." — National Children's Bureau (UK)

The definition of child neglect is broad. There are no specific guidelines that determine when a child is being neglected; therefore, it is up to government agencies and professional groups to determine what is considered neglect. In general, child neglect is considered the failure of parents or caregivers to meet the needs that are necessary for the mental, physical, and emotional development of a child.

Child neglect is one of the most common forms of child maltreatment, and it continues to be a serious problem for many children. Child neglect tremendously affects the physical development, mental development, and emotional development of a child causing long-term consequences, such as poor academic achievement, depression, and personality disorders. These consequences also impact society, since it is more likely that children who suffered from child neglect will have substance use disorder problems and educational failure when they grow up.

== Types ==
There are various types of child neglect.

Types	Definition	Case study examples
Supervisory	Guardian or parent of a child is unable or unwilling to display acceptable supervision or control over the child or young person, e.g. leaving the child alone for long periods.	Henry, a 7-year-old boy, walks home from school every day and looks after himself until his mother comes home at 7 PM. Sometimes, he tries to cook food on the stove or goes for walks to the local shops.
Physical	Basic physical needs are not met due to the child not being provided with food, water, clothing, shelter, inadequate hygiene, etc.	Joyce, a 4-year-old girl, is given snacks (chips and chocolate) and McDonald's meals by her father. Her father does not like to cook, and when he does, it is just frozen meals. Although she is fed, her nutritional needs are not met.
Medical	Refusal or delay in child receiving needed medical care.	Ben, a 9-year-old boy, has had a cough for a month. His parents are worried about his health. However, his father has recently lost his job, so his parents continue to not take him to a doctor because of the financial cost.
Educational	Guardian or parent fails to ensure that the child receives formal education, e.g. attending school, ensuring special needs requirements are met.	Thomas, an 8-year-old boy, hates school. His mother has given up on making him attend as he throws a tantrum each time. He has missed over a month of school. His teachers suspect that he has a learning disability, but his mother has not had him tested.
Emotional	Guardian or parent give inadequate nurturing or affection. The parent or guardian fails to create an environment where the child feels secure, loved, wanted, worthy, etc.	Tiana, a 3-year-old girl, is currently in childcare from 7 AM to 7 PM every weekday. Both her parents work long hours. On the weekends, her parents gave her an iPad to keep her content, but are too busy to play or talk to her directly.

- Physical neglect refers to the failure to provide a child with necessities of life, such as food and clothing.
- Medical neglect is a failure of caregivers to meet a child's basic health care needs, such as not brushing teeth daily, bathing a child and or taking children to doctor visits when needed.
- Emotional neglect is failing to provide emotional support, such as emotional security and encouragement.
- Educational/developmental neglect is the failure to provide a child with experiences for necessary growth and development, such as not sending a child to school or educating them.
- Depending on the laws and child protection policies in one's area, leaving a young child unsupervised may be considered neglect, especially if doing so places the child in danger.

Child neglect can also be described by degrees of severity and the responses considered warranted by communities and government agencies.

- Mild neglect is the least likely to be perceived as neglect by the child but raises the possibility of harm in ways that need intervention by the community. An example might be a parent who does not use a proper car safety seat.
- Moderate neglect occurs when some harm to the child has occurred. An example might be a child repeatedly dressed inappropriately for the weather (e.g. shorts in winter.) In cases of moderate harm, governmental agencies might be called in to assist parents.
- Severe neglect occurs over time and results in significant harm to the child. An example might be a child with asthma being denied treatment.

== Experience ==
Children may be left at home alone, which can result in negative consequences. Being left at home alone can leave young people feeling scared, vulnerable and not knowing when their parents are going to return. The frequency and duration of being left at home alone may range from every evening to several days or even weeks at a time.

Also, young children may not be provided with a suitable amount of decent food to eat, which is another form of neglect. Children have reported being provided with mouldy food, not having any food in the house, or they were given an insufficient amount of food.

== Causes ==
The causes of child neglect are complex and can be attributed to three different levels: an intrapersonal, an inter-personal/family, and a social/economic level. Although the causes of neglect are varied, studies suggest that, amongst other things, parental mental health problems, substance abuse, domestic violence, unemployment, and poverty are factors which increase the likelihood of neglect. Children that result from unintended pregnancies are more likely to suffer from abuse and neglect. They are also more likely to live in poverty. Neglectful families often experience a variety or a combination of adverse factors.

=== Intra-personal ===
At the intra-personal level, the discussion around neglectful parents' characteristics often focuses on mothers, reflecting traditional notions of women as primary caregivers for children. "Neglectful attributes" have included an inability to plan, lack of confidence about the future, difficulty with managing money, emotional immaturity, lack of knowledge of children's needs, a large number of children, being a teenage mother, high levels of stress and poor socioeconomic circumstances. Mental health problems, particularly depression, have been linked with a parent's inability to meet a child's needs. Likewise, substance misuse is believed to play a crucial role in undermining a parent's ability to cope with parental responsibilities. Recent empirical works have also pointed to parental burnout (i.e., chronic lack of parenting resources) as an especially potent mechanism in driving neglectful behaviour toward children. While the literature largely focuses on mothers, the role of fathers in neglect, as well as the impact of their absence, remains largely unexplored. There is still little known about whether mothers and fathers neglect differently and how this affects children. Similarly, not much is known about whether girls and boys experience neglect differently.

=== Interpersonal/family ===
At the interpersonal/family level, a significant number of neglectful families are headed by a lone mother or have a transient male. Unstable and abusive relationships have also been mentioned as increasing the risk of child neglect. The impact of living with domestic violence on children frequently includes either direct violence or forced witnessing of abuse, which is potentially very damaging to children. While the UK Department of Health connects children's exposure to domestic violence to parents' failure to protect them from emotional harm, the notion of "failure to protect" has been challenged as it focuses primarily on the responsibility of the abused parent, usually the mother, who is often herself at significant risk. A recent reform to the Domestic Violence, Crime and Victims Act (2004) has introduced a new offence of causing or allowing the death of a child or vulnerable adult, thus reinforcing the notion of "failure to protect". Research on domestic violence, however, has consistently shown that supporting the non-abusive parent is good for child protection. There is some indication of the cyclical and inter-generational nature of neglect. A study on childhood abuse and the mother's later ability to be sensitive to a child's emotions showed that mothers with a self-reported history of physical abuse had higher indications of insensitivity and lack of attunement to infants' emotional cues than mothers with no history of abuse. Although the literature suggests that neglectful parents may have been affected adversely by their own past experiences, more research is needed to explore the link between past experiences of maltreatment and neglectful parenting behaviours. Alcohol and drug abuse in caregivers are important risk factors for recurrent child maltreatment after accounting for other known risk factors; the increased risk appears to be similar between alcohol and drug abuse.

=== Socioeconomic ===
At the social and economic level, the association between poverty and neglect has frequently been made. A study of the maltreatment of children by the National Society for the Prevention of Cruelty to Children (NSPCC) supports the association between neglect and lower socio-economic class. US studies have shown that less affluent families are more likely to be found to maltreat their children, particularly in the form of neglect and physical abuse, than affluent families. Some argue that many forms of physical neglect, such as inadequate clothing, exposure to environmental hazards and poor hygiene may be directly attributed to poverty whereas others are more cautious in making a direct link. Studies have shown that parents in a low socioeconomic level are less likely to purchase resources needed for their children, which makes them experience school failure at a more frequent level. While poverty is believed to increase the likelihood of neglect, poverty does not predetermine neglect. Many low-income families are not neglectful and provide loving homes for their children. However, when poverty coexists with other forms of adversity, it can negatively impact a parent's ability to cope with stressors and undermine their capacity to adequately respond to their child's needs. It can also mean that parents who want to work are faced with the choice between being unemployed and leaving their children at home. McSherry argues that the relationship between child neglect and poverty should be seen as circular and interdependent. Where caregiver alcohol abuse is identified, children are significantly more likely to experience multiple incidents of neglect compared with children where this is not identified, as were children where other family risk factors (including markers of socioeconomic disadvantage) are found.

== Parenting styles ==
The patterns of repetitive behaviour point out that a cycle of violence repeats. Research on the correlation between child neglect and parenting styles has shown that those who suffered from parental neglect tend to have problems in relationships as adults. Attachment style of children of abusive parents was less secure compared to children with authoritative caregivers. Children who suffered from physical and emotional abuse are more likely to have an insecure attachment, such as being preoccupied, dismissive, or fearful. Three parenting styles lead to child neglect: authoritarian, permissive, and disengaged styles.

== Taboo ==
There is some evidence to suggest that there is a cultural taboo around acknowledging child neglect in one's own family. In one research study parents who accessed a service focused on families where child neglect is a concern never mentioned the word 'neglect' during interviews designed to find out about their experience of the service. In an analysis of NSPCC Childline data, John Cameron, the Head of Helplines reported that many of the neglected children who contacted the line did not use the word neglect and did not indicate that they were being neglected when they first spoke to a member of Childline.

== Effects ==
Effects of child neglect can differ depending on the individual and how much treatment is provided, but generally speaking child neglect that occurs in the first two years of a child's life may be more of an important precursor of childhood aggression compared to later neglect, which may not have as strong a correlation. Maltreatment in children leads to compromises in the development of cognitive, language, socioemotional, and neurobiological domains. Children who suffer from neglect most often also have attachment difficulties, cognitive deficits, emotional/behavioural problems, and physical consequences as a result of neglect. Early neglect has the potential to modify the body's stress response, specifically cortisol levels (stress hormones) which can cause abnormalities and alter the body's overall health. Research has shown that there is a relationship between neglect and disturbing patterns of infant-caretaker attachment. If parents lack sensitivity to their baby's needs, the baby may develop insecure-anxious attachment. The neglectful behaviour the child experiences will contribute to their attachment difficulties and formation of relationships in the future, or lack thereof. In addition to biological and social effects, neglect affects the intellectual ability and cognitive/academic deficits. Children who suffer from child neglect may also suffer from anxiety or impulse-control disorders. Another result of child neglect is what people call "failure to thrive". Infants who have deficits in growth and abnormal behaviours such as withdrawal, apathy and excessive sleep are failing to thrive, rather than developing to become "healthy" individuals.

A study by Robert Wilson, a professor at Rush University Medical Center in Chicago, and his colleagues, showed for the first time that children under the age of 18 when moderately neglected in some manner by their caregivers had a 3 times likely risk of stroke over those with moderately low levels, after controlling for some common risk factors (they interviewed 1,040 participants ages 55 or older; after 3 1/2 years, 257 of them died and 192 were autopsied, with 89 having stroke evidence upon autopsy and another 40 had a history of it). Neglect, bullying, and abuse have previously been linked to changes in the brain's grey matter and white matter and to accelerated ageing.

== Statistics ==
In terms of who is reported for neglectful behaviour, it is most often women. The higher proportion of females reported for neglect may reflect the social attitude that mothers are responsible for meeting the needs of their children. In recent years, latent issues for child development and for the culture and political economy that are associated with paternal neglect have received more attention, however. Neglecting parents interact less with their children, engage in less verbal instruction and play behaviour, show less affection and are involved in more negative interactions with their children, for example, verbal aggression. Often parents who neglect their children are single parents or disabled mothers who already have to care for themselves, and therefore the child is an additional stress. This additional stress is often neglected. Family size can contribute to child neglect. If a family has several children, they may not be able to give all the children all the necessities needed to survive and thrive. Unfortunately, if the family cannot provide for all their children, children can suffer neglect. Family history can play a role in parents' neglectful behaviour. If parents were neglected as children meaning they learned neglectful behaviour from their parents, they often internalize and believe those behaviours to be the "norm", which results in neglecting their children. In one study done in 2011, results showed that one in four mothers were neglectful, and neglect was four times as likely with a maternal history of physical abuse in childhood than with no history of maltreatment. Neglect is by far the most common type of child abuse reported in the U.S., and in 2016, it accounted for nearly 65 per cent of child abuse cases.

== Disclosure ==
Research suggests that most neglected children, even when they can talk to a professional about their circumstances, do not use the word 'neglect' and may not even indicate that they are being neglected. It is therefore recommended that professionals are proactive in exploring for and identifying neglect.

When neglect is disclosed, action is not always taken. Equally, when professionals pass concerns about neglect on to other professionals in the workplace they find those professionals do not always respond. The NSPCC recently reported on the case of a teaching assistant, who contacted the organization with concerns about a particular child. The teaching assistant asked to remain anonymous, fearing that she would be sacked by her school if they were to find out that she'd made the disclosure.

== Assessing and identifying ==
Assessing and identifying neglect pose several challenges for practitioners.

Selecting the right method to identify neglect can be helped by having a clear conceptualization of neglect. Neglect is a process whereby a child experiences developmental delay owing to the fact of not having received sufficient levels of any combination of care, stimulation or nutrition, which collectively can be referred to as nurturance. Given that neglect is a dynamic between the child's development and levels of nurturance, the question in identifying neglect, becomes one of where does one start, with the child's development or with the levels of nurturance?

=== Development-focused methods ===
Some professionals identify neglect by measuring the developmental levels of a child, for if those developmental levels are normal, one can, by definition, conclude that a child is not being neglected. Areas of development that could be measured include weight, height, stamina, social and emotional responses, and speech and motor development. All these features go up to make a medical assessment of whether a child is thriving, so that a professional looking to start an assessment of neglect, might reasonably start with information collected by a doctor. Infants are often weighed and measured when seen by their physicians for well-baby check-ups. The physician initiates a more complete evaluation when the infant's development and functioning are found to be delayed. What this suggests is that social work staff could consult medical notes to establish if the baby or child is failing to thrive, as the first step in a pathway towards identifying neglect. If developmental levels are subnormal, then the identification of neglect requires the professional to establish if those subnormal levels of development can be put down to the level of nurturance experienced by the child. One needs to discount that the developmental delay was caused by some genetic condition or disease. These development-focused methods used for detecting child neglect and abuse are among the most effective we have to date, are useful tools for professionals to quickly recognize and easily detect when something is amiss in regards to the care of a child.

=== Starting the assessment by examining the nurturance received by the child ===
Another way of beginning the process of identifying neglect is to identify if the child in question is experiencing a level of nurturance lower than that considered necessary to support normal development. In part, this requires a knowledge of the level of nurturance required by the child to sustain normal development, which might be particular to his or her age, gender and other factors. However, quite how one ascertains what a particular child needs, without referring back to their level of development, is not something theory and policy on neglect is clear about. Furthermore, ascertaining whether a child is getting the requisite level of nurturance needs to take into account not just the intensity of the nurturance, but also, given that the intensity of certain forms of nurturance can carry across time, the duration and frequency of the nurturance. It is OK for a child to experience varying and low levels of certain types of nurturance across a day and from time to time, however, it is not OK if the levels of nurturance never cross thresholds of intensity, duration and frequency. For this reason, professionals are minded to keep detailed histories of care provision, which demonstrate the duration to which the child is exposed to periods of subnormal exposure to care, stimulation and nutrition.

=== Starting the assessment by examining the nurturance provided by the carer or parent ===
Professionals should focus on the levels of nurturance provided by the carers of the child, where neglect is understood as an issue of the parent's behaviour. Some authors feel that establishing the failure of parents and caregivers to provide care would be sufficient to conclude that neglect was occurring. Action for Children states that "A child experiences neglect when the adults who look after them fail to meet their needs" clearly defining neglect as a matter of parental performance. This raises the question about what level of nurturance, a carer or parent needs to fall under, to provoke developmental delay, and how one goes about measuring that accurately.

The method, which focuses on the stimulation provided by the carer, can be subject to critique. Neglect is about the child's development being adversely affected by the levels of nurturance, but the carers' provision of nurturance is not always a good indicator of the level of nurturance received by the child. Neglect may be occurring at school, outside of parental care. The child may be receiving nurturance from siblings or through a boarding school education, which compensates for the lack of nurturance provided by the parents.

=== Linking development to stimulation ===
Neglect is a process whereby children experience developmental delay owing to experiencing insufficient levels of nurturance. It has been argued that in principle, this means that when starting an assessment of neglect by identifying developmental delay one needs to then check the levels of nurturance received by the child. Certainly, where guidance on identifying neglect does urge practitioners to measure developmental levels, some guidance urges practitioners to focus on how developmental levels can be attributed to parental behaviour. However the narrow focus on parental behaviour can be criticised for unnecessarily ruling out the possible impact of institutionalised neglect, e.g. neglect at school.

If one starts by concluding that the levels of nurturance received by the child are insufficient, one then needs to consider the developmental levels achieved by the child.

Further challenges arise, however. Even when one has established developmental delay and exposure to low levels of nurturance, one needs to rule out the possibility that the link between the two is coincidental. The developmental delay may be caused by a genetic disorder, disease or physical, sexual or emotional abuse. Of course, the developmental delay may be caused by a mixture of underexposure to nurturance, abuse, genetics and disease.

=== Practical tools for measuring ===
The Graded Care Profile Tool is a practice tool which gives an objective measure of the quality of care in terms of a parent/carer's commitment. It was developed in the UK.

The North Carolina Family Assessment Scale is a tool which can be used by a practitioner to explore whether neglect is taking place across a range of family functioning areas. The NSPCC makes use of the NCFAS in their Evidence Based Decision-making Practice Model, which involves a Society practitioner working alongside the local authorities assigned a social worker to review the functioning of the family in complex neglect cases.

== Intervention programs ==
Early intervention programs and treatments in developed countries include individual counselling, family, group counselling and social support services, and behavioural skills training programs to eliminate problematic behaviour and teach parents "appropriate" parenting behaviour.

=== Parenting programmes ===
==== Video Interaction Guidance ====
Video interaction guidance is a video feedback intervention through which a "guider" helps a client to enhance communication within relationships. The client is guided to analyse and reflect on video clips of their interactions. Video Interaction Guidance has been used where concerns have been expressed over possible parental neglect in cases where the focus child is aged 2–12, and where the child is not the subject of a child protection plan.

==== SafeCare ====
The SafeCare programme is a preventative programme working with parents of children under 6 years old who are at risk of experiencing significant harm through neglect. The programme is delivered in the home by trained practitioners, over 18 to 20 sessions and focuses on 3 key areas: parent-infant/child interaction; home safety and child health.

==== Triple P ====
Triple P is a positive parenting program. It is a multilevel, parenting and family support strategy. The idea behind it is that if parents are educated on "proper" parenting and given the appropriate resources, it could help decrease the number of child neglect cases. When deciding whether to leave a child home alone, caregivers need to consider the child's physical, mental, and emotional well-being, as well as state laws and policies regarding this issue.

== Effectiveness of intervention programs ==
Evidence for the effectiveness of intervention programs can be divided into two types. One type is impact studies where the evaluation aims to demonstrate a statistically significant improvement in outcomes on a population, which can be attributed to the intervention. A second type is qualitative studies which aim to illuminate the mechanisms through which program participants can access the resources and help offered in the program to achieve better outcomes.

=== Impact studies ===
Several interventions aimed at families where child neglect is occurring have been subject to an impact study.

==== Video interaction guidance ====
Video Interaction Guidance has been used where concerns have been expressed over possible parental neglect in cases where the focus child is aged 2–12, and where the child is not the subject of a child protection plan. An evaluation of the project demonstrated that VIG produced a significant change in the emotional and behavioural difficulties of the population of children who received the service, and improvement in the reported level of parenting and reported parental relationship with their children in the population of parents whose children received the service. The data excludes parents who failed to complete the programme, parents who completed the programme but decided not to complete evaluation measures, and on some measures parents who completed measures but whose feedback was adjudged to have been positively biased.

==== SafeCare ====
The SafeCare programme has been provided to families in the United Kingdom where a professional has judged there is a risk of experiencing significant harm through neglect. Outcome data shows that on average families who participated in the evaluation of the programme improved parenting skills and reduced neglectful behaviours. Furthermore, all referrers reported seeing positive changes in the families they referred, particularly in home safety, parent-child interaction and health. However, in the absence of a comparison group it was not possible to attribute the changes to SafeCare.

==== Triple P ====
Triple P has also been provided to families in the United Kingdom where neglect is a concern. The findings from this service showed that on average the children who participated in the evaluation experienced improved emotional and behavioural outcomes. However, this positive change could not be attributed to Triple P because a control group had not been established.

=== Mechanisms to stop neglect ===
Qualitative research studies have also illuminated some of how programs can help individual parents.

==== Social learning theory ====
Evaluations have demonstrated that in certain cases parents have learned to improve their parenting in the way described by social learning theory. Social Learning Theory suggests people learn by observing behaviours and the positive outcomes associated with them. An evaluation of the Triple P intervention highlighted how many parents were able to improve how they related to their children after having received advice about how to be clear with their children, and in some cases after having tried and seen the effects of such approaches for themselves, first-hand, and often for the first time. Prompted by Video Interaction Guidance, parents–with several children, who traditionally spent time with each of them all together in a group–started spending one-to-one time with their children, oftentimes for the very first time. Some parents also started to do activities with their children, which involved a small element of risk, after having agreed to do them for the first time as part of Video Interaction Guidance.

==== Relationship between practitioner and parent ====
A common finding across evaluations of programmes designed to help families where neglect is a concern is that the principal factor which influences parents' engagement and perception is the quality of the relationship that they can build with the practitioner delivering the programme. Key factors in helping practitioners engage parents in the intervention include:

- Establishing a sense that the practitioner will support the family beyond what is necessary to complete the intervention.
- Giving family members time to talk about their problems both during and outside of appointments.
- Advocating for the family on issues with which the intervention is not directly concerned.
- Ensuring that fun forms a part of the interaction.
- Making family members feel cared for through the provision of clothes, food and gifts.
- Giving parents a lead in analysing family functioning and parenting.
- Carrying out the intervention in the home of the parent.
- Practitioners working on weekday evenings.

In the case of Video Interaction Guidance, when parents were asked about their experience of the intervention, parents invariably referred to the care and support provided by the practitioner. Effectively the intervention is experienced as an aspect of the overall relationship of care.

== Legal parameters ==
=== United States ===
There are laws at both the federal level and state level which seek to punish child neglect. In accordance with the guidelines set forth by the federal Child Abuse Prevention & Treatment Act (CAPTA), the parameters that encapsulate child neglect contain two primary statutes:

- "Any recent act or failure to act on the part of a parent or caretaker which results in death, serious physical or emotional harm, sexual abuse or exploitation."
- "An act or failure to act that presents an imminent risk of serious harm."

While specific laws may be dependent on a state legislative basis, the CAPTA serves as a foundation for categorizing and identifying the qualifications for maltreatment to be categorized as neglect. The investigation process of child neglect begins with a report, and is then evaluated to determine the grounds of a criminal charge. Prosecution of parents or caretakers engaging in child neglect is punishable by fines, loss of custody, and imprisonment.

In recent years, the question of whether or not child neglect is responsible for the autonomous criminal decisions a minor may make has been a contentious topic. Parents have begun to be convicted based on new laws that hold them responsible for criminal actions, assuming that it qualifies to the extent of child neglect.

== Children's responses ==
There are a variety of ways in which children can act in response to an experience of neglect.

- Some children attempt to talk about the neglect of their parents. In some cases, the parents may respond aggressively or abusively to such attempts to resolve the issue.
- Some children steal money from their parents' purses to feed themselves.
- Babies are too young to ameliorate parental neglect, however in some cases siblings will step in and take care of them. Some older siblings go without food so that their younger siblings can eat.
- Some children will attempt to flee from their homes. If the child was hungry, they will go to their homes or find the food from a dumpster/ a place that can get free food.

== See also ==
- Child abuse
- Deadbeat parent
- Neglect
- Passive-aggressive behavior
- Self-neglect
