= Child development in Africa =

Child development in Africa addresses the variables and social changes that occur in African children from infancy through adolescence. Three complementary lines of scholarship have sought to generate knowledge about child development in Africa, specifically rooted in endogenous, African ways of knowing: analysis of traditional proverbs, theory-building, and documentation of parental ethno-theories. The first approach has examined the indigenous formulations of child development and socialisation values embedded in African languages and oral traditions. Several collections of proverbs have been published in different African languages, and their content has been analysed to show the recurrence of the themes of shared communal responsibility for children's moral guidance and the importance of providing it early in life.

== Nsamenang's view ==
The African social ontogeny proposed by Nsamenang is phrased within an eco-cultural perspective, and draws from writings by African scholars in philosophy and the humanities. This theory explains a shared worldview among diverse ethnic groups, based on rigorous observational research and personal experiences of the rural Nso community's socialisation practices, in Cameroon. The process of social development unfolds in seven phases, each characterised by specific developmental tasks. In the initial phase, known as the naming ceremony, the desired socialised identity for a neonate is projected. Its primary objective is to achieve successful social priming, attained through interactions such as cuddling and teasing, which elicit smiles from the infants in response to adult stimuli. Parents and caregivers provide food, playthings, and engage in verbal and nonverbal cues to encourage reciprocity, establishing a foundation for the "sharing and exchange norms" that bind the social system. Rabain and Mtonga describe similar infant teasing practices among the Wolof of Senegal and among the Chewa and Tumbuka of Zambia. Such interactions are believed to cultivate generosity.

The second phase, referred to as "social apprenticing," roughly corresponds to childhood. Its primary task is the recognition and rehearsal of social roles across four hierarchical spheres: self, household, network, and public. Adults delegate responsibilities to preadolescent and adolescent children, including the care and socialisation of younger siblings. This practice serves as a catalyst for the development of social responsibility. The priming strategies embedded in indigenous African childcare practices have significant implications for designing culturally appropriate interventions that optimise developmental opportunities for children. In many African communities, far from a form of exploitation, caregiving responsibilities assigned to preadolescents and adolescents are part of ‘an indigenous educational strategy that keeps children in contact with existential realities and the activities of daily life [that] represents the participatory component of social integration’. A case study conducted in Zambia demonstrated the successful integration of this strategy into a service-learning program at a primary school, promoting social responsibility among both girls and boys and yielding improved academic performance.

It is important to acknowledge that the generalisability of Nsamenang's "West African" theory across the diverse societies of sub-Saharan Africa is subject to debate. For example, the Gusii community in rural Kenya during the 1950s and 1970s displayed mother-infant interactions that sharply contrasted with Nsamenang's description of social priming through cuddling and teasing. Gusii mothers, ‘are not expected to talk to or gaze at their infants or play with them’, and they explain how this (strange to Western eyes) emotional detachment is compatible with healthy emotional development in later life. They attributed this to playful stimulation and emotional support provided by older siblings and other child caregivers. This disparity between ethnographic accounts serves as a reminder that considerable variations exist among different ethnocultural groups within Africa. Consequently, further in-depth research on socialisation practices is necessary.

== African games and songs ==
Another significant feature of the developmental niche described by many researchers on African early childhood is the prominence of elaborate play activities, unsupervised by adults. Marfo and Biersteker note that while Western psychological theories primarily emphasise the role of play in cognitive development, anthropological studies conducted in Africa have underscored its interactive nature, serving as a process for social enculturation. Play in this context creates opportunities for the rehearsal, critique, and adoption of cultural practices. African games exhibit well-documented cognitive and social structures. Furthermore, music and dance hold significant importance in most African cultures, with children actively participating in these activities from a young age. Mtonga analysed the texts of Chewa and Tumbuka children's songs and games observed in rural and urban areas of Zambia, highlighting how they reveal ‘reasoning and understanding the psychology of other participants’, and ‘playful and skilful manipulation of certain word-sounds in order to distort meaning, create new concepts, or paint a satirical caricature...’. It is worth noting that children's play in these communities tends to include individuals from various age groups and those with physical disabilities.

However, despite the strong emphasis on play in the imported curricula of early childhood care and education (ECCE) programs from the Western preschool orthodoxy, indigenous games are seldom utilised as resources for enrichment in Africa. Okwany, Ngutuku and Muhangi describe a number of recent initiatives in Kenya and Uganda where a systematic attempt was made to ‘leverage indigenous knowledge for child care’, by deploying local traditional songs, proverbs, and food production, preparation and preservation practices as resources for the enrichment of children's intellectual, emotional and nutritional development, rather than ‘downgrading’ them in favour of those imported from the West. Unfortunately, as Hyde and Kabiru note, such efforts are relatively rare, and ‘centre-based programmes in Africa tend to be heavily influenced by Western culture and sometimes are not relevant to the needs of children and society’.

== Child-to-Child approach (CtC) ==
Despite extensive efforts by African governments in recent decades to improve access to education, the prevailing structure of formal schooling in most countries often leads to a significant number of students to ‘drop out’ before completing the full 12-year curriculum, starting from Grade 1. This situation has resulted in the perception among teachers, parents, and students that formal education resembles a challenging climb up a narrowing staircase, where dropping out at earlier stages is seen as a failure and the return of individuals to their communities is a source of disappointment. The prevailing belief is that the limited years of schooling do not contribute significantly to an individual's productive capacity within the community. As a result, schooling is commonly seen as a means of selectively recruiting the most talented individuals from the community into a higher and more powerful social stratum. To address the limitations of the traditional schooling model, various alternative approaches have been proposed, including apprenticeship, lifelong learning, school production units, health education, and the Child-to-Child approach (CtC).

The CtC approach aims to mobilise children as agents of health education. It differs from the traditional narrowing staircase model by placing emphasis on fostering social responsibility in pre-adolescent children, aligning with the Chewa concept of nzelu. The inspiration for CtC originated from the widespread African practice of entrusting younger siblings' care to preadolescent children. The approach has been implemented in more than 80 countries worldwide. A case study was conducted to explore the integrative curriculum development by a group of Zambian primary school teachers using the CtC approach. These teachers sought to incorporate traditional cultural practices into the formal educational process, recognising that pre-adolescent children are capable of assuming responsibility as agents of infant care and nurturing within the context of primary health care and progressive social change. The graduates of the school's CtC curriculum reported significant long-term benefits, including the development of egalitarian relationships between genders, even within adult marriages.

== See also ==
- Child development
- Education in Africa

== Sources ==
This article incorporates text from a free content work. Licensed under CC-BY-SA IGO 3.0 (license statement/permission). Text taken from Investing against Evidence: The Global State of Early Childhood Care and Education, 231-237, Marope, P.T.M., Kaga, Y., UNESCO. UNESCO.
