= Matthew Sanders (parenting researcher) =

Australian academic

Professor Matthew Sanders AO FASSA
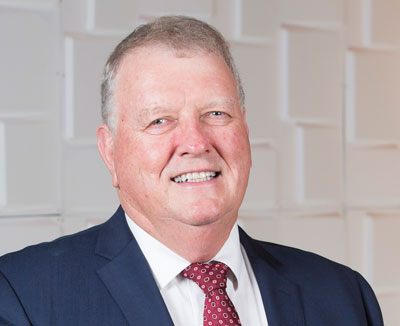
- Prof Matthew Sanders, parenting researcher at the University of Queensland and a Queensland Great
- Born: Matthew Roy Sanders
- Occupation: University Professor Academic University Researcher Family Psychologist
- Employer: University of Queensland

Matthew Roy Sanders AO FASSA is a parenting researcher and professor at the University of Queensland in Brisbane, Queensland, Australia. In 2018, he was named as one of the Queensland Greats by Queensland Premier Annastacia Palaszczuk in a ceremony at the Queensland Art Gallery on 8 June 2018.

Sanders is the founder of the iconic Positive Parenting Program, known as Triple P. The program is a world leader in its approaches to parenting and family interventions. Hundreds of thousands of families across Queensland and Australia have already benefited from the program that has been translated into 22 languages and used in 28 countries by more than 76,000 accredited practitioners. Professor Sanders’ expertise is highly valued by policy makers all around the world and has advised many institutions including the Queensland Health Paediatric Advisory Panel, Education Queensland, National Suicide Prevention Council, US Ministry of Health, the Council of Europe, and the World Health Organization. Professor Sanders continues to be one of the world's most highly cited parenting researchers.

Sanders was elected a Fellow of the Academy of the Social Sciences in Australia in 2016. In the 2020 Australia Day Honours Sanders was appointed an Officer of the Order of Australia (AO) for "distinguished service to education and research in clinical psychology, and to child, parent and family wellbeing".
