= Parent management training =

Treatment programs that aim to change parenting behaviors

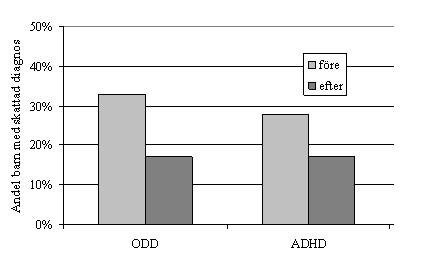
Effects of Parent Management Training, c.2025

Parent management training (PMT), also known as behavioral parent training (BPT) or simply parent training, is a family of treatment programs that aims to change parenting behaviors, teaching parents positive reinforcement methods for improving preschool and school-age children's behavior problems (such as aggression, hyperactivity, temper tantrums, and difficulty following directions).

PMT is one of the most investigated treatments available for disruptive behavior, particularly oppositional defiant disorder (ODD) and conduct disorder (CD); it is effective in reducing child disruptive behavior and improving parental mental health. PMT has also been studied as a treatment for disruptive behaviors in children with other conditions. Limitations of the existing research on PMT include a lack of knowledge on mechanisms of change and the absence of studies of long-term outcomes. PMT may be more difficult to implement when parents are unable to participate fully due to psychopathology, limited cognitive capacity, high partner conflict, or inability to attend weekly sessions.

PMT was initially developed in the 1960s by child psychologists who studied changing children's disruptive behaviors by intervening to change parent behaviors. The model was inspired by principles of operant conditioning and Applied behavior analysis. Treatment, which typically lasts for several months, focuses on parents learning to provide positive reinforcement, such as praise and rewards, for children's appropriate behaviors while setting proper limits, using methods such as removing attention for inappropriate behaviors.

== Technique ==
Poor parenting, inadequate parental supervision, discipline that is not consistent, and parental mental health status, stress or substance abuse all contribute to early-onset conduct problems; the resulting costs to society are high. In the context of developing countries in particular, family socio-economic disadvantage is a significant predictor of abusive parenting that impacts adolescents' psychological, behavioural and physical health outcomes. Negative parenting practices and negative child behavior contribute to one another in a "coercive cycle", in which one person begins by using a negative behavior to control the other person's behavior. That person in turn responds with a negative behavior, and the negative exchange escalates until one person's negative behavior "wins" the battle. For example, if a child throws a temper tantrum to avoid doing a chore, the parent may respond by yelling that the child must do it, to which the child responds by tantruming even louder, at which point the parent may give in to the child to avoid further disruption. The child's tantrums are thereby reinforced; by throwing a tantrum, the child has achieved the end goal of getting out of the chore. PMT seeks to break patterns that reinforce negative behavior by instead teaching parents to reinforce positive behaviors.

The content of PMT, as well as the sequencing of skills within the training, varies according to the approach being used. In most PMT, parents are taught to define and record observations of their child's behavior, both positive and negative; this may involve the use of a progress chart. This monitoring procedure provides useful information for the parents and therapist to set specific goals for treatment, and to measure the child's progress over time. Parents learn to give specific, concise instructions using eye contact while speaking in a calm manner.

Providing positive reinforcement for appropriate child behaviors is a major focus of PMT. Typically, parents learn to reward appropriate behavior through social rewards (such as praise, smiles, and hugs) as well as concrete rewards (such as stickers or points towards a larger reward as part of an incentive system created collaboratively with the child). In addition, parents learn to select simple behaviors as an initial focus and reward each of the small steps that their child achieves towards reaching a larger goal (this concept is called "successive approximations").

PMT also teaches parents to appropriately set limits using structured techniques in response to their child's negative behavior. The different ways in which parents are taught to respond to positive versus negative behavior in children is sometimes referred to as differential reinforcement. For mildly annoying but not dangerous behavior, parents practice ignoring the behavior. Following unwanted behavior, parents are also introduced to the proper use of the time-out technique, in which parents remove attention (which serves as a form of reinforcement) from the child for a specified period of time. Parents also learn to remove their child's privileges, such as television or play time, in a systematic way in response to unwanted behavior. Across all of these strategies, the therapist emphasizes that consequences should be administered calmly, immediately, and consistently, and balanced with encouragement for positive behaviors.

In addition to positive reinforcement and limit setting in the home, many PMT programs incorporate collaboration with the child's teacher to track behavior in school and link it to the reward program at home. Another common element of many PMT programs is preparing parents to manage problem behaviors in situations that are typically difficult for the child, such as being in a public place. A 2025 systematic review reinforced the effectiveness of psychosocial interventions, particularly those involving both parent and child (multicomponent) or parent-only approaches, in reducing disruptive behaviors among children. These interventions were more effective than standard care or no intervention. A 2026 meta-analysis measured how well parent training works. For preschoolers, parent-only training showed medium effects right after treatment and continued showing benefits months and years later. For elementary-aged children, parent training showed smaller effects immediately after treatment but medium effects at short-term follow-up. Programs that work with both parents and children showed the strongest results for both age groups.

The training is usually delivered by therapists (psychologists or social workers) to individual families or groups of families, and is conducted primarily with the parents rather than the child, although children can become involved as the therapist and parents see fit. A typical training course consists of 12 core weekly sessions, with different programs ranging from 4 to 24 weekly sessions.

PMT is underutilized and training for therapists and other providers has been limited; it has not been widely used outside of clinical and research settings.

== Programs ==
The theory behind PMT has been "repeatedly validated", and many programs have met the "gold-standard criteria for well-established interventions". All of the established programs teach better parenting skills and emphasize that the parent-child relationship is "bidirectional".

Specific treatment programs that can be broadly characterized as PMT include parent–child interaction therapy (PCIT), the Incredible Years parent training (IYPT), positive parenting program (Triple P), and Parent management training – Oregon model (PMTO). PCIT, IYPT, Triple P and Helping the non-compliant child (HNC) are among the most frequently used PMTs; according to Menting et al (2013), IYPT "is considered a 'blueprint' for violence prevention".

The per family cost of group parent training programs to bring an average child into a non-clinical range of behavioral disruption was estimated in 2013 to be US$2,500, which according to the authors of a Cochrane review was "modest when compared with the long-term health, social, educational and legal costs associated with childhood conduct problems".

== Effects ==
=== Childhood disruptive behaviors ===
PMT is one of the most extensively studied treatments for childhood disruptive behaviors. PMT tended to have larger effects for younger children than older children, although the differences between age groups were not statistically significant. Improvement in parental mental health (depression, stress, irritability, anxiety, and sense of confidence) as well as parental behavior is noted. Improvements in child and parent behavior were maintained up to one year after PMT, although the effects were small; very few studies have been done on the durability of the effects of PMT.

Families from economically disadvantaged backgrounds were less likely to benefit from PMT than their more advantaged counterparts, but this difference was attenuated if the low-income families received individual rather than group treatment. Overall, group formats of PMT delivery were less effective than individual formats, and the addition of individual therapy for the child did not improve outcomes. Parental psychopathology, substance abuse, and maternal depression are associated with less successful outcomes; this may be because the "parents' ability to learn and consolidate the skills being taught" is affected, or parents may not be able to stay engaged in the program or translate the skills acquired to the home.

Furlong et al (2013) concluded that group-based PMT is cost-effective in reducing conduct problems, and improving parental health and parenting skills, but that there is not enough evidence that it is effective on the measures of "child emotional problems and educational and cognitive abilities".

=== Other childhood-onset conditions ===
Although the bulk of the research on PMT examines its impact on disruptive behavior, it has also been studied as an intervention for other conditions.

Conflict is high in families of children with attention-deficit hyperactivity disorder (ADHD), with parents showing "more negative and ineffective parenting (e.g., power assertive, punitive, inconsistent) and less positive or warm parenting, relative to parents of children without ADHD". PMT targets dysfunctional parenting and school-related problems of children with ADHD, such as work completion and peer problems. Pfiffner and Haack (2014) say PMT is well-established as a treatment for school-age children with ADHD, but that questions persist about the best methods for delivering PMT. A meta-analysis of evidence-based ADHD treatment in children further supports this, as researchers found wide variability in how PMT was carried out across previous studies. This analysis also noted that the clinicians involved in these studies often modified the training based on the needs of the family. This variation, however, did not create significant differences in effectiveness of PMT across studies.

A 2011 Cochrane review found some evidence that PMT improves general child behavior and parental stress in treating ADHD, but has limited effects on ADHD-specific behavior. The authors concluded that there was a lack of data to evaluate school achievement, and a risk of bias in the studies due to poor methodology; existing evidence was not strong enough to form clear clinical guidelines with regard to PMT for ADHD, or to say whether group or individual PMT was more effective. A 2024 systematic review found a low strength of evidence from a 2024 systematic review suggesting that parent support programs can improve ADHD symptoms and disruptive behaviors in children.

A 2009 review of long-term outcomes in children with Tourette syndrome (TS) said that, in those children with TS who have other comorbid conditions, PMT is effective in dealing with explosive behaviors and anger management.

The US National Institute of Mental Health has designated the "gap between evidence-based treatments and community services" as an area critically in need of more research; PMT for disruptive behaviors in children with autism spectrum disorders is an area of ongoing research.

== Limitations ==
There is a great deal of support for PMT in the research literature, but several limitations of the research have been noted. A common concern with implementing evidence-based treatments in community (as opposed to research) contexts is that the robust effects found in clinical trials may not generalize to complex community populations and settings. To address this concern, a meta-analysis of PMT studies coded across "real-world" criteria found no significant differences in the effectiveness of PMT when it was delivered to clinic versus study-referred populations, in routine service versus research settings, or by non-specialist versus specialist therapists (such as those with direct links to the program developers). Increased attention to the impact of cultural diversity on PMT outcomes – especially given that parenting practices are deeply rooted in culture – was called for in the 1990s; a 2013 review said the emphasis on ethnic and cultural differences was unjustified in terms of efficacy.

Other limitations of the existing research is that studies tend to focus on statistically significant rather than clinically significant change (for example, whether the child's daily functioning actually improves); there is no data on long-term sustainability of treatment effects; and little is known about the processes or mechanisms through which PMT improves outcomes.

Training programs other than PMT may be better indicated for "parents with significant psychopathology (such as anger management problems, ADHD, depression, substance abuse), limited cognitive capacity, or those in highly conflicted marital/partner relationships", or those parents unlikely or unable to attend weekly sessions.

== History ==
Parent management training was developed in the early 1960s in response to an urgent need in American child guidance clinics. Research across a national network of these clinics revealed that the treatments being used for young children with disruptive behaviors, who constituted the majority of children served in these settings, were largely ineffective. Several child psychologists, including Robert Wahler, Constance Hanf, Martha E. Bernal, and Gerald Patterson, were inspired to develop new treatments based on behavioral principles of operant conditioning and applied behavioral analysis. Between 1965 and 1975, a behavioral model of parent training treatment was established, that emphasized teaching parents to positively reinforce prosocial child behavior (such as praising a child for following directions) while negatively incentivizing antisocial behavior (such as removing parental attention after the child throws a tantrum). The early work of Hanf and Patterson hypothesized that "teaching parents the principles of behavioral reinforcement would result in effective, sustainable change in child behavior". Early studies of this approach showed that the treatment was effective in the short-term in improving parenting skills and reducing children's disruptive behaviors. Patterson and colleagues theorized that adverse environmental contexts lead to disruptions in parent practices, which then contribute to negative child outcomes.

Following the initial development of PMT, a second wave of research from 1975 to 1985 focused on the longer-term effects and generalization of treatment to settings other than the clinic (such as home or school), larger family effects (such as improved parenting with siblings), and behavioral improvements outside of the targeted areas (such as improved ability to make friends). Since 1985, the literature on PMT has continued to expand, with researchers exploring such topics as application of the treatment to serious clinical problems, dealing with client resistance to treatment, prevention programs, and implementation with diverse populations.

Evidence in support of PMT has not always been rigorously examined; future research should examine the effectiveness of PMT on the families most at risk, address parental psychopathology as a factor in outcomes, examine whether gains from PMT are maintained in the long-term, and better account for variability in outcomes dependent on practices under "real-world" conditions.
