= SafeCare (programme) =

British child care programme

The SafeCare programme in the United Kingdom works with parents of children under age six who are at risk of experiencing significant harm through neglect.

SafeCare is delivered in the home by trained practitioners. The programme encompasses 18 to 20 sessions that focus on:

- parent-infant/child interaction
- home safety
- child health

== Theory of change ==
The SafeCare theory of change is based on social learning theory. Social Learning Theory suggests people learn by observing positive desired outcomes resulting from the observed behaviour.

== Attrition ==
Attrition occurs when a parent who takes up a programme fails to complete it.

In one study of the SafeCare programme, 73% of parents who signed up to the programme were unable to complete it in full. Nevertheless, practitioners identified a range of positive outcomes for families who exited the programme prior to completion.

== Evidence for effectiveness ==
Evidence for the effectiveness of intervention programs can be divided into two types.

- impact studies where the aim of the evaluation is to demonstrate a statistically significant improvement in outcomes on a population, which can be attributed to the intervention.
- qualitative studies which aim to illuminate the mechanisms through which program participants can access the resources and help offered in the program to achieve better outcomes.

=== Impact studies ===
In 2012 a cluster trial experiment demonstrates significant maltreatment recidivism reduction due to implementing SafeCare in a fully scaled-up statewide system.

SafeCare has been provided to families when a professional has judged there is a risk of experiencing significant harm through neglect. Outcome data shows that on average families who participated in the evaluation of the programme improved parenting skills and reduced neglectful behaviours. Furthermore, all referrers reported see positive changes in the families they referred, particularly in home safety, parent child interaction and health. However, in the absence of a comparison group it was not possible to attribute the changes to SafeCare.

=== Understanding the mechanisms through which neglect can be stopped ===
Research on the ways in which parents engage with SafeCare show that the home visitors' tactics for engagement and home visitors' modelling key behaviours are key to influencing individual outcomes.

==== Engagement ====
Parents experiences of SafeCare are often influenced by the nature of the relationship they develop with the practitioner who delivers the programme. It helps when practitioners

- work in the family's home
- are punctual
- let parents know in advance if they need to cancel
- listen to parents' concerns
- make a genuine effort to get to know family members

==== Modelling behaviour ====
In certain cases parents have worked with the SafeCare home visitor to improve their parenting in the way described by Social Learning Theory. Social Learning Theory suggests people learn by observing positive desired outcomes resulting from the observed behaviour.

Parents reported adopting and doing new games and activities, as a result of having the games and activities by a practitioner. This can lead to children interacting differently with their parents, by joining in with housework. It can lead to parents finding out about their children's interests, which prompts them to do new activities with their child like going to the library.

Where parents have had disciplinary techniques successfully modelled, it can lead to parents feeling more confident about taking their children out of the house, and giving them new opportunities like playing in parks.

Improved behaviour sometimes can result in better behaviour at school.
