= Triple P (parenting program) =

Educational program

Triple P is a parenting intervention with the main goals of increasing the knowledge, skills, and confidence of parents and reducing the prevalence of mental health, emotional, and behavioral problems in children and adolescents. The program was originally specifically tailored for at risk children and parents, but there are now different levels of Triple P designed to work together as a broad, universal, public health approach. This program is based on principles of community psychology.

== History ==
Triple P, or the "Positive Parenting Program", was created by Professor Matthew R. Sanders and colleagues, in 2001 at the University of Queensland in Australia and evolved from a small “home-based, individually administered training program for parents of disruptive preschool children” into a comprehensive preventive intervention program (p. 506). This program was inspired by health promotion programs aimed at impacting people at the population level. The overall goal of the program is to enhance the knowledge, skills, and confidence of parents in order to prevent behavioral, emotional, and developmental problems in children and adolescents.

== Program elements ==
=== Overview ===
There are five developmental periods that are targeted from infancy to adolescence. At each developmental period, the range of the program can be either broad and target the entire population or it can be specific and target only at-risk children. The program addresses social contexts that influence parents’ daily life: mass media, primary health care services, child care and school systems, work sites, religious organizations, and the broader political system (p. 507). The multilevel nature of the program is designed to increase efficiency, minimize costs, and ensure dissemination. The design also maximizes usage of existing community resources.

=== Specific goals ===
- Promoting self-sufficiency of parents so that they may feel confident in their abilities to parent with minimal or no additional support.
- Increase parental self-efficacy so that the parent believes he or she can overcome a problem in parenting when it arises.
- Use self-management tools so that parents may change parenting practices for the better. This involves self-assessment of performance, setting goals, and choosing child management techniques.
- Promoting personal agency meaning that parents must learn to “own” the improvements in their family situation.
- Promoting problem solving so that parents can learn how to "define problems, formulate opinions, develop a parenting plan, execute the plan, evaluate the outcome, and revise the plan as required" (p. 507).

=== Principles of positive parenting ===
1. Safe and Engaging Environment
  A protective environment that is safe, supervised, and provides opportunities to explore, play, and learn promotes healthy child development at all ages.
2. Positive Learning Environment
  This principle involves teaching parents to be their children's first teacher. This means that parents must learn to respond to their children's requests in a positive and constructive manner while also helping them learn to solve problems on their own.
3. Assertive Discipline
  The program teaches parents how to change from using ineffective and coercive discipline such as physical punishment, shouting, and threatening to using effective strategies in specific situations. Effective strategies include selecting ground rules for specific situations, discussing rules with children, giving clear, calm, and age-appropriate directions and requests, presenting logical consequences, using quiet time and time out, and using planned ignoring (p. 509).
4. Realistic Expectations
  This helps parents change expectations and goals for child behavior to be developmentally appropriate for the child and realistic for the parent. Parents who have more realistic expectations of this child's capabilities are less likely to engage in child abuse or child neglect.
5. Parental Self-Care
  This principle aims at teaching parents practical skills so that they may view parenting as part of a larger context related to self-care, resourcefulness, and well-being and maintain a sense of self-esteem.

=== Programs ===
In addition to the program for younger children (Standard Triple P), there are versions of Triple P for families with specific needs, including parents of adolescents (Teen Triple P), parents with a child with a disability (Stepping Stones Triple P) and parents who are separated or divorced (Family Transitions Triple P).)

== Research ==
Evidence for the effectiveness of intervention programs can be divided into two types. One type is impact studies where the aim of the evaluation is to demonstrate a statistically significant improvement in outcomes on a population, which can be attributed to the intervention. A second type is qualitative studies which aim to illuminate the mechanisms through which program participants can access the resources and help offered in the program to achieve better outcomes.

Nowak and Heinrichs (2008) conducted a meta-analysis that analyzed findings of 55 research studies on the Positive Parenting Program and found reliable positive effects of the program across all settings (initial levels of problems and countries) for child behavior problems, parenting behavior, and parental well-being. Parents’ relationship quality also significantly improved as a result of the program. The findings were unable to establish whether positive child effects were due to an increase in positive behavior or a decrease in problematic behavior. According to the authors, the results of the meta-analysis indicated the program's “ability to effect meaningful improvements in parents and children” (p. 114). Furthermore, Triple P has also been provided to families in the United Kingdom where neglect is a concern. The findings from this service showed that, on average the children who participated in the evaluation experienced improved emotional and behavioural outcomes. However this positive change could not be attributed to Triple P because a control group had not been established.

A critical 2012 systematic review and meta-analysis of these interventions revealed many small, underpowered and poorly-controlled studies, with substantial risk of reporting bias, triggering a response from a group including many Triple-P authors. Another commentary in the same journal claimed the response did not adequately address the critique and indicated that commitments to such programmes by policy-makers needs to be based on sound evidence, or risks wasting money. A later meta-analysis by a group including Triple-P authors was published in 2014 claiming widespread benefits in the short and long term.

Qualitative research studies have also illuminated some of the ways in which programs can help individual parents. An evaluation of the Triple P intervention highlighted how many parents were able to improve the way in which they related to their children after having received advice about how to be clear and boundaries with their children, and in some cases after having tried and seen the effects of such approaches for themselves, first-hand, and often for the first time. ^{[51]}
