= Self-neglect =

Behavioral condition

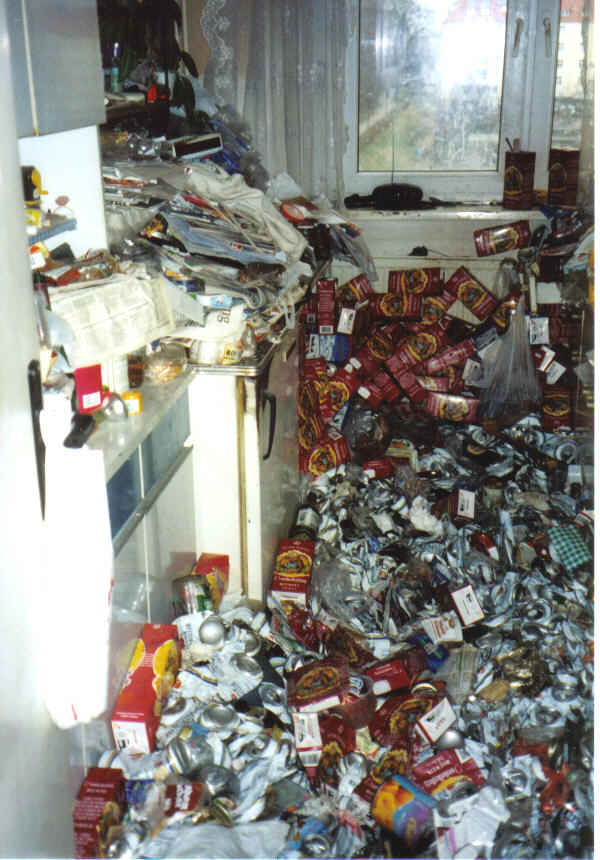
A house that has accumulated with trash due to neglect

Self-neglect is a behavioral condition in which an individual neglects to attend to their basic needs, such as personal hygiene, appropriate clothing, feeding, or tending appropriately to any medical conditions they have. More generally, any lack of self-care in terms of personal health, hygiene and living conditions can be referred to as self-neglect. Extreme self-neglect can be known as Diogenes syndrome.

== Classification ==
There are two types of self-neglect: intentional (active), and non-intentional (passive). Intentional self-neglect occurs when a person makes a conscious choice to engage in self-neglect. Non-intentional self-neglect occurs as a result of health-related conditions that contribute to the risk of developing self-neglect. Different societies and cultures can have different beliefs regarding acceptable living standards, making self-neglect a serious and complex problem requiring clinical, social, and ethical decisions in its management and treatment.

== Presentation ==
=== Complication ===
Without sufficient personal hygiene, sores can develop and minor wounds may become infected. Existing health problems may be exacerbated, due to insufficient attention being paid to them by the individual. Neglect of personal hygiene may mean that the person suffers social difficulties and isolation.

Self-neglect can also lead to the individual having a general reduction in attempts to maintain a healthy lifestyle, with increased smoking, drug misuse or lack of exercise.

Any mental causes of the self-neglect may also lead to the individual refusing offers of help from medical or adult social services.

== Causes ==
Self-neglect can be as a result of brain injury, dementia or mental illness. It can be a result of any mental or physical illness which has an effect on the person's physical abilities, energy levels, attention, organizational skills or motivation.

A decrease in motivation can also be a side effect of psychiatric medications, putting those who require them at a higher risk of self-neglect than might be caused by mental illness alone.

== Risk factors ==
Risk factors are:

- Child abuse
- Advancing age
- Mental health problems
- Cognitive impairment
- Dementia
- Frontal lobe dysfunction
- Depression
- Chronic illness
- Nutritional deficiency
- Alcohol and substance misuse
- Functional and social dependency
- Social isolation
- Delirium

Age-related changes that result in functional decline, cognitive impairment, frailty, or psychiatric illness increase vulnerability for self-neglect. For this reason, it is thought that, while self-neglect can occur across the lifespan, it is more common in older people. Self-neglect is thought to be linked to underlying mental illnesses.

Living in squalor is sometimes accompanied by dementia, alcoholism, schizophrenia, or personality disorders. Conversely, research has shown that 30–50% people suffering from self-neglect have shown no psychiatric disorders that would explain their behavior. Alternate models to the medical model, such as sociological and psychological, offer broader perspectives that take into account the complexities and factors associated with self-neglect.These alternate models emphasize cultural and social values and personal circumstances, and posit that self-neglect develops over time and can be rooted in family relationships and cultural values.

== Diagnosis ==
=== Definition ===
There is no clear operational definition of self-neglect — some research suggests it is not possible for a universal definition due to its complexity. Gibbons (2006) defined it as: "The inability (intentional or non-intentional) to maintain a socially and culturally accepted standard of self-care with the potential for serious consequences to the health and well-being of the self-neglecters and perhaps even to their community." The behaviors and characteristics of living in self-neglect include unkempt personal appearance, hoarding items and pets, neglecting household maintenance, living in an unclean environment, poor personal hygiene, and eccentric behaviors. Research also points to behaviors such as unwillingness to take medication, and feelings of isolation. Some of these behaviors could be explained by functional and financial constraints, as well as personal or lifestyle choices.

=== Use in assessment of needs ===
Neglect of hygiene is considered as part of the Global Assessment of Functioning, where it indicates the lowest level of individual functioning. It is also part of the activities of daily living criteria used to assess an individual's care needs. In the UK, difficulty in attending to their physical cleanliness or need for adequate food are part of the criteria indicating whether a person is eligible for Disability Living Allowance.

== Treatments ==
Treatment may involve treating the cause of the individual's self-neglect, with treatments such as those for depression, dementia or any physical problems that are hampering their ability to care for themselves.

The individual may be monitored, so that any excessive deterioration in their health or levels of self-care can be observed and acted upon.

Treatment can involve care workers providing home care, attending to cleansing, dressing or feeding the individual as necessary, without reducing their independence and autonomy any more than is essential. In combination with other illnesses, self-neglect may be one of the indicators that a person would be a candidate for treatment in sheltered housing or residential care. This would also improve their condition by providing opportunities for social interaction.

If the person is deemed not to have the mental capacity to make decisions about their own care, they may be sectioned or compelled to accept help. If they are in possession of their mental faculties, they have a right to refuse treatment.

== See also ==
- Clinical depression, a common cause
- Neglect
