= The Graded Care Profile Tool =

The Graded Care Profile (GCP) Tool is a practice tool that provides an objective measure of the quality of care in terms of a parent/carer's commitment. It was developed in the UK. It is often used in cases where child neglect is suspected.

== History ==
The GCP tool was developed by Dr. Srivastava, a Consultant Paediatrician and designated doctor for child protection. It was the subject of his research at the University of Nottingham which got published in 1997 (Ref:5).

In 1999, the GCP tool began being used by the Luton Borough Council and by Luton Health Trust professionals. Since then, its use has spread across the United Kingdom. It has been translated into Japanese and Spanish.

The original GCP tool continues to be used in Luton and other areas by the author's permission but other unauthorised versions appeared elsewhere.. The First authorised update was undertaken by the NSPCC in collaboration with Srivastava in 2015. it was named 'The Graded Care Profile 2 (The GCP2)..

== Evaluation ==
A recent qualitative evaluation of the GCP found that social workers felt the tool was useful in helping them identify the right help for children at risk of harm. It also helped them develop a good working relationship with the family because it allowed them to identify what the family was doing well, in addition to what needed to be improved.
