= North Carolina Family Assessment Scale =

Widely recognized standard measuring family functionality

The North Carolina Family Assessment Scale (NCFAS) measures family functioning from the perspective of the worker most involved with the family. It guides professionals to make a decision on whether action should be taken. It does this by having professionals rate a family from -3 to +2 across a range of areas of family functioning, where a negative score means that there is a legal or ethical reason for intervening.

== History ==
The original NCFAS was developed in 1998 by Dr Ray Kirk at the University of North Carolina-Chapel Hill. The NCFAS has an "A" rating on the California Evidence-Based Clearinghouse for Child Welfare.

== Types ==
There are several variants of the North Carolina Family Assessment Scale.

=== NCFAS ===
NCFAS stands for the North Carolina Family Assessment Scale. It is intended for use in Differential Response settings. It was developed for high-risk family service cases.

=== NCFAS-G ===
NCFAS-G stands for the North Carolina Family Assessment Scale for General Services. It is intended as a broad-based family assessment tool that can be used with all agency programs.

=== NCFAS-R ===
NCFAS-R stands for the North Carolina Family Assessment Scale for Reunification. It is intended as a tool for helping to determine the risk of out-of-home placement or successful reunification for a family in the context of family strengths and problems.

=== NCFAS-G+R ===
NCFAS-G+R stands for the North Carolina Family Assessment Scale for General Services and Reunification. The combined scale is intended for use by agencies that provide a wide variety of services for both intact and reunifying families.

== Applications ==
The NCFAS and its variants are used in direct service and as an evaluation tool to assess family functioning. It is used throughout the world, particularly in the United States, Australia, Latin America and the United Kingdom.

These tools are owned by the National Family Preservation Network, so agencies must purchase them from NFPN. Once the purchase is processed, agencies receive the tools and are issued a license for the number of workers who will be using them. Additional staff may be added by paying a fee. Transferring this license to another agency also requires a fee and permission from NFPN. No trainers outside the purchasing agency’s staff may train on the tool without permission of NFPN and no training materials may be distributed outside the licensed agency or posted on any publicly accessible website. NFPN vigorously tracks and enforces this licensing agreement. https://www.nfpn.org
