= Neglect =

Form of abuse

In the context of caregiving, neglect is a form of abuse where the perpetrator, who is responsible for caring for someone who is unable to care for themselves, fails to do so. It can be a result of carelessness, indifference, or unwillingness and abuse.

Neglect may include the failure to provide sufficient supervision, nourishment, or medical care, or the failure to fulfill other needs for which the victim cannot provide themselves. The term is also applied when necessary care is withheld by those responsible for providing it from animals, plants, and even inanimate objects. Neglect can carry on in a child's life falling into many long-term side effects, including physical injuries, developmental trauma disorder, low self-esteem, attention disorders, violent behavior, and death.

== Legal definition ==
In English law, neglect is a term of art, identical to the (now deprecated) expression lack of care and different from the concept of negligence. Its sole function is to qualify a verdict returned at an inquest by finding that it was a factor that contributed to a death.

== Consequences of neglect ==
There are many different types of neglect but they all have consequences, whether it be physically or mentally.

=== Child neglect ===
Neglect can affect the body physically by affecting a child's development and health, sometimes leading to chronic medical problems. Children experiencing neglect often suffer from malnutrition, which causes abnormal patterns for development. Not being given the proper nutrients at certain growth periods can result in stunted growth, and inadequate bone and muscle growth. Brain functioning and information processing may also be affected by neglect. This may lead to difficulty in understanding directions, poor understanding of social relationships, or the inability to complete academic tasks without assistance. Neglected children or adults can have physical injuries like fractures or severe burns that go untreated, or infections, lice and other signs of lack of care. There are many physical effects neglect can have on a person.

Not only is neglect associated with physical problems; it also has an effect on a person mentally, ranging from poor peer relationships to violent behavior. Not only is behavior affected, but the way a person looks at themselves, which can lead to low self-esteem and the feeling of being unwanted. Neglect is more severe in younger children when it comes to psychological consequences. Parental detachment can harm the child's development of bonding and attachment to the parents, causing the child's expectations to be the same when they get older (furthering the cycle of abuse). Too little parental availability can result in difficulties in problem solving, coping with stressful situations and social relationships. Studies of neglected children show heightened levels of depression and hopelessness, and higher incidents of suicide attempts.

The effects of neglect on child development are collectively called deprivation, the absence of environmental inputs needed for development. In this context, deprivation is often contrasted with threat, experiences involving harm or threat of harm.

== See also ==
- Child abuse
- Elder abuse
- Negligence
- Passive–aggressive behavior
- Self-neglect
