= Folk science =

Folk science, also known as "folk knowledge" or "folk classification" describes ways of understanding and predicting the natural and social world, without the use of formalized, rigorous methodologies (see Scientific method). One could label all understanding of nature predating the Greeks as "folk science". Folk science is often positioned in contrast to mechanistic or “clockwork” understandings of the world, where the function of each part and the relationship of all parts to each other is known in detail.

It is unclear how folk science develops in humans. However, even children as young as 8 months old have been shown to understand some root concepts of folk biology. Children's understanding does shift as they age, with the system of inferences they use developing as they grow.

Folk science is often accepted as "common wisdom" in a given culture, and people often don’t realize that their explanations and understandings rely on folk science. While this is common in children, even adults tend to believe they have a more complete understanding of mechanisms than they really do. Because folk science is something people, even children, do naturally, scientists are not exempt. Folk science makes appearances in the theories of professional scientists. Anthropological studies of scientists show that their theories often stem from models with gaps, deductions, and analogies. While these simplifications and gaps are not part of the scientific method, they do often work and scientific advances continue to use folk scientific methods. In some cases, researchers might look deliberately to folk methods to augment or improve their own. Several notable examples of folk science intuition (such as the world being flat or the sun revolving around the Earth) clarify why it is important to continue to use the scientific method to gather data to confirm or deny folk scientific theories.

Formal sciences, due to their thorough permeation of society, can ultimately influence folk sciences. An example would be the concept of genetics, which is familiar to most adults in the 21st century, but at the level of a layperson. This leads to different inferences and folk scientific conclusions than those that would have been reached by a population without that knowledge. However, some kinds of folk science exist in all cultures. Folk biology, for example, is similar in all human societies. These similarities include how plants and animals are grouped, and the hierarchies of these groups (such as “oaks” being a group of plants which is within the “tree” group). It also includes the ability to make inferences about some organisms based on other, similarly categorized, organisms.

== Some examples of folk science ==
- Folk biology
- Folk history
- Folk linguistics
- Folk psychology
- Folk taxonomy
- Informal mathematics
- Naïve physics
- Physiognomy
- Weather lore

== See also ==
- Ethnobiology
- Pseudoscience
