= Infant cognitive development =

How babies develop the ability to think and know things

Infant cognitive development is the first stage of human cognitive development, in the youngest children. The academic field of infant cognitive development studies how psychological processes involved in thinking and knowing develop in young children. Information is acquired in a number of ways including through sight, sound, touch, taste, smell and language, all of which require processing by our cognitive system.

Scientific investigation in this field has its origin in the first half of the 20th century, an early and influential theory in this field is Jean Piaget's theory of cognitive development. Since Piaget's contribution to the field, infant cognitive development and methods for its investigation have advanced considerably, with numerous psychologists investigating different areas of cognitive development including memory, language and perception, coming up with various theories—for example Neo-Piagetian theories of cognitive development.

== Overview ==
Tabula rasa is an idea (by now a discredited theory) that, at birth, the human mind is a "blank slate" without any rules for processing data, that data is added and rules for processing it are formed solely by one's sensory experiences. The modern idea of the theory is mostly attributed to John Locke's An Essay Concerning Human Understanding, written in the 17th century.

Its corollary, nativism, argues that we are born with certain cognitive modules that allow us to learn and acquire certain skills, such as language, (for example the theory of Universal Grammar, the theory that the 'programming' for grammar is hardwired in the brain) and is most associated with the recent work of Noam Chomsky, Jerry Fodor, and Steven Pinker.

If one accepts that nothing is known until learned, and that everyone shares a basic common sense, it appears infants must—to some degree—make some specific ontological inferences about how the world works, and what kinds of things it contains. This procedure is studied in psychology and its validity is studied in philosophy.

We acquire these ordinary [common sense] beliefs at an early age and we take them for granted in everyday life; ... Then, because we are also self-reflective creatures, we turn back on our commonsense assumptions and find them to be more puzzling and problematic than we had bargained for. The concepts we habitually employ raise the kinds of disturbing questions we call philosophical'.

— Colin McGinn, Problems in Philosophy. 1993,

The notion of shared intentionality, a category of processes during social learning at the onset of life when organisms in the simple-reflexes substage of the sensorimotor stage of cognitive development do not maintain communication via the sensory system, proposes another approach to the problem: Cognition is fostered by social bonds between children and caregivers, which gradually increase through shared intentionality. Based on recent insights in neuroscience research, proponents argue that this collaborative interaction emerges in the mother-child pairs at birth for sharing the essential sensory stimulus of the actual cognitive problem.

== Jean Piaget ==
Through observations of children, Jean Piaget established a theory of cognitive development. According to Piaget's theory of cognitive development there are four stages of cognitive development.

1. Sensorimotor Stage (Birth to 24 Months)
2. Preoperational Stage (24 Months to 7 Years)
3. Concrete Operational Stage (7 Years to 12 Years)
4. Formal Operational Stage (12 Years and Up)

Infant cognitive development occurs in the Sensorimotor stage which starts at birth and extends until the infant is about 2 years of age. The sensorimotor stage is made up of six sub-stages.

Stage	Age	What's Happening	Example
Stage 1 – Reflexes	Birth - 6 weeks	Infants primarily interact with the world through reflexes, such as sucking, grasping, and looking.	A newborn automatically sucks on anything that touches their lips.
Stage 2 – Primary Circular Reactions	6 weeks - 4 months	Infants begin to repeat actions that bring them pleasure or interesting sensations. These actions are focused on their own body.	A baby repeatedly sucks their thumb because it feels good.
Stage 3 – Secondary Circular Reactions	4 months - 8 months	Infants start to combine actions to achieve a goal. They show intentional behavior and can anticipate events.	A baby repeatedly shakes a rattle to hear the sound it makes.
Stage 4 – Coordination of Secondary Circular Reactions	8 months - 12 months	Infants start to combine actions to achieve a goal. They show intentional behavior and can anticipate events.	A baby pushes aside a toy to reach another toy underneath it.
Stage 5 – Tertiary Circular Reactions	12 months - 18 months	Infants actively explore their environment and experiment with new behaviors. They try out different actions to see what happens.	A toddler drops different objects from their high chair to see how they fall.
Stage 6 – Mental Representation	18 months - 24 months	Infants begin to develop mental representations of objects and events. They can think about things that are not physically present and start to engage in pretend play.	A toddler pretends to feed a doll with an empty spoon.

In the sensorimotor stage, language is absent however infants do show signs of the development of intelligence via action schemes, the basic ways of learning about the physical world.

This begins with reflexes, fixed and predictable behavioral responses. Reflexes which can be practiced develop into action schemes via assimilation, fitting new experiences into what they already know.

The conditioning of reflexes causes the development of habits, systematic coordinated behaviors, but infants fail to understand the causality of their behavior.

They then develop coordination, involving grasping and manipulating objects to know how their actions cause things to occur, but without understanding why it occurs, in a form of practical intelligence. They then divide different objects by their physical properties.

Once action schemes are formed, they can be connected and differentiated using accommodation based on where and when objects exist.

Finally, infants are able to connect and differentiate their internal world with the external world.

== Lev Vygotsky ==
Lev Vygotsky was also very influential in cognitive development theory. His theory included the Zone of proximal development. Vygotsky also believed that social and cultural factors contributed heavily to cognitive development. Vygotsky argued that development first takes place socially as infants observe their parent's behavior and try to imitate it. As this imitation occurs, parents will guide their children, correcting them and provide challenges for them. Play is an integral part of cognitive development according to Vygotsky, as it is through this play that children gain confidence in their language skills, and start regulating their own thought processes. Through his research Vygotsky suggested that a child's performance differs depending on whether they are solving a problem alone or if another child or adult is assisting them. He refers to this difference as the "zone of proximal development". The theory states that if a child is learning to complete a task, and a more competent person is able to provide assistance, then the child is able to move into a new zone of development and problem solving. Vygotsky refers to this movement through assistance as "scaffolding" and helps bridge the gap between the child's current cognitive abilities and their full potential.

== Erik Erikson ==
Erik Erikson was a prominent developmental psychologist, who produced a psychoanalytical theory of psychosocial behavior, showing 8 stages of development from infancy to adulthood. At each stage the individual is set with a potential conflict, and either success or failure at each point will go on to determine the outcome of the psychological state of the person. The first stage of development runs from birth to 18 months and thus covers the infancy period. The conflict which Erikson identified during this time was trust vs mistrust. During this vulnerable point in the child's life, they are faced with uncertainties in the world and are therefore reliant on their caregiver. If the child receives consistent care then Erikson claimed that the infant would develop a sense of trust. However, if the care received has been unreliable, mistrust will develop, which may result in heightened feelings of insecurity and anxiety, in future relationships.

== The development of mental processes ==
=== Adaptive nature of cognitive immaturity ===
A hypothesis of pre-perceptual multimodal integration explains an adaptive nature of cognitive development and converges two competing naturalist and constructivist viewpoints about cognition. According to the hypothesis, mental processes such as perception, attention, memory, and awareness begin with the association of affective cues with stimuli responsible for triggering the neuronal pathways of simple reflexes. This pre-perceptual multimodal integration can succeed owing to neuronal coherence in mother-child dyads beginning from pregnancy. According to professor Igor Val Danilov, the natural neurostimulation of the mother's heart on the embryonal nervous system ensures the balanced development of the embryo's nervous system with the necessary cognitive functions. Electromagnetic properties of the mother's heart and its interaction with the mother's own and fetal nervous system (physical laws of electromagnetic interference) form neuronal coherence in the mother-fetus bio-system, providing the template beginning from pregnancy. The cognitive-reflex stimuli conjunctions form simple innate neuronal assemblies, shaping the cognitive neuronal patterns in statistical learning that, as empirical evidence showed, are continuously connected with the neuronal pathways of reflexes.

Development is typically considered to be something progressive: as we age we move from more simple to more complex structures or behaviors. This causes us to interpret early or immature forms of cognition as incomplete forms of the adult model. This does not always hold true. Immature forms of development can serve some function of their own, as it adapts for the current environment of the infant. For example, infant's relatively poor perceptual skills protect their nervous system from undergoing sensory overload. The fact that infants have slow information processing prevents them from establishing intellectual habits early in their lives that would cause problems later in life, as their environments are significantly different. From this it could be argued that infants and young children's cognitive and perceptual abilities might be designed to be suited to their needs at that particular time in their lives rather than incomplete versions of the more sophisticated models possessed in adults. Hanus Papousek (1977) looked at the concept that learning at an early stage of development may not be beneficial to the infant if it creates overstimulation. In an experiment he conditioned infants to turn their heads to the sound of a buzzer. The training for the task began either at birth or at 31 or at 44 days. He discovered that infants took many more trials and days to learn the task if they learned from birth than the infants who learned later. Infants need stimulation, but if stimulation is too great, it could distract infants and young children from other tasks, and replace other, more crucial activities to their development such as social interaction.

=== Attention ===
According to Professor Wilhelm Wundt (1832-1920), physiologist and philosopher, attention is the concentration of awareness on some phenomenon during a period, which is necessary to elevate the clear perception of the narrow region of the content of consciousness and which is feasible to control this focus in mind. Therefore, attention is a process of controlling thought that continues over time. His experiments showed that the size of the focal area of consciousness in adults ranges from three to six items. According to associate professor at Rīga Stradiņš University Sandra Mihailova and research professor in bioengineering at Liepaja University Igor Val Danilov, the development of the scope of attention in young children becomes evident within the first three years of life as they show considerable advances in increasing focal area. The empirical data has four stages:

- The first stage, with up to two items in the focal point, lasts up to about six months of age.
- The second stage, with up to three items, begins after eight months.
- The third stage appears at about 3.5 years of age with four items.
- The fourth stage starts in children when they are about five years old and can hold five or more items in the focal point.

=== Memory ===
The development of memory in children becomes evident within the first 2 to 3 years of a child's life as they show considerable advances in declarative memory. This enhancement continues into adolescence with major developments in short term memory, working memory, long-term memory and autobiographical memory.

Research on the development of memory has indicated that declarative, or explicit memory, may exist in infants who are even younger than two years old. For example, newborns who are less than 3 days old demonstrate a preference for their mother's own voice.

=== Perception ===
==== Attribution of causality ====
The perception of causality was initially studied by professor Albert Michotte where he presented adults with animated images of moving balls. By manipulating the direction and timing of the moving balls (spatial and temporal dimensions) he was able to influence participants' perception of causality. There is contradicting evidence on whether causal perception is innate and present at birth or whether it is a result of perception development. Through research with very young infants, many studies have shown support for the theory that humans are born with the mechanisms needed for the perception of causality. Recent research has even shown this ability in newborns only a few hours old. However, other studies have shown similar results received by Michotte (1976) in infants as young as 6 months, but not younger. These studies support a more developmental progression of abilities required for the perception of causality.

==== Object permanence ====
Object permanence is the understanding that an object continues to exist, even when one cannot see it or touch it. It is an important milestone in the stages of cognitive development for infants. Numerous tests regarding it have been done, usually involving a toy and a crude barrier which is placed in front of the toy, and then removed repeatedly (peekaboo). In early sensorimotor stages, the infant is completely unable to comprehend object permanence. Psychologist Jean Piaget conducted experiments with infants which led him to conclude that this awareness was typically achieved at eight to nine months of age. Infants before this age are too young to understand object permanence, which explains why infants at this age do not cry when their mothers are gone – "Out of sight, out of mind". A lack of object permanence can lead to A-not-B errors, where children look for an object at the location where they first discovered it rather than where they have just seen it placed.

==== Depth perception ====
Studies in psychology also suggest that three dimensionality and depth perception is not necessarily fully intuitive, and must be partially learned in infancy using an unconscious inference. The acquisition of depth perception and its development in infant cognitive systems was researched by professor Richard D. Walk. Walk found that human infants can discriminate depth well from an "innate learned" point of view: they are able to discriminate depth from the age at which they can be tested. However, their visual mechanisms are still maturing. Walk discovered that infants are better able to discriminate depth when there is a definitive pattern separating the deeper and shallower areas than if either one is at all indefinite, and that the depth and distance must be of a certain level of distance in order to be successfully distinguished by the infant. According to Walk there is a clear development of perceptual behaviour, as with increasing age it is shown that children are able to discriminate between depths more accurately, and gauge more subtle differences between depths.

==== Physical laws ====
Largely thanks to the innovative strategies developed by professor Renee Baillargeon and her colleagues, significant insights have been developed regarding how young infants comprehend natural physical laws. Much of this research depends on carefully observing when infants react as if events are unexpected. For example, if an infant sees an object that appears to be suspended in mid-air, and behaves as if this is unexpected, then this suggests that the infant has an understanding that things usually fall if they are not supported. Baillargeon and her colleagues have contributed evidence, for example, about infants' understanding of object permanence and their reasoning about hidden objects.

==== Shared intentionality ====
The noted above hypotheses plausibly explain perception development when the nervous system of the young organism has already mastered the mode to distinguish relevant stimuli from the cacophony of electromagnetic waves, chemical interactions, and pressure fluctuations. The Shared intentionality approach attempts to describe environmental learning in the previous developmental period (even before birth) when nothing is still known, and the young organism just learns how to assimilate basic common meanings. It still needs to overcome the binding problem to choose relevant stimuli for primary data entry. Neuroscience research studies declared observed inter-brain activity under conditions without communication in pairs while subjects were solving the shared cognitive problem, and they registered an increased inter-brain activity in contrast to the condition when subjects solved a similar problem alone. These data show that collaborative interaction without sensory cues can emerge in mother-child dyads, providing Shared intentionality, which indicates to the immature organism the essential sensory stimulus of the actual cognitive problem. Latvian professor Igor Val Danilov proposed the Shared intentionality hypothesis, which attempts to explain neurophysiological processes at the beginning of cognitive development at different levels of interaction, from interpersonal dynamics to neuronal interactions.

=== Language ===
From birth, babies are learning to communicate. The communication begins with crying and then begins to develop into cooing and babbling. Infants develop their speech by mimicking those around them. Gestures and facial expressions are all part of language development. In the first three months of life babies will generally use different crying types to express their different needs, as well as making other sounds such as cooing. They will begin mimicking facial expressions and smiling at the sight of familiar faces. Between the ages of 4–6 months infants have a greater response towards different tones in voices, and greater engagement, watching the speaker's face. The child's own language skills develop with larger variation in babbling sounds, and elicit responses in conversation through babbling. From 7 months to the end of their first year babies are able to understand frequently heard words and can respond to simple requests. Their babbling becomes more complex and they communicate with it as if they are making sense, they use babbling to express their desires. Non-verbal communication also develops and actions such as waving goodbye are produced. This is also the period in which babies often say their first word, an important milestone in the child's life.

There are a number of theories as to how children acquire language, including the work of Skinner, who argued that language is learnt via reinforcement. Skinner argued that echoic verbal behavior is essential to child language acquisition. Parents reinforce language by responding with attention and correcting mistakes, promoting more accurate language development.

Others argue that language acquisition is innate, such as Chomsky. He argues that all babies are born with an innate language faculty helping them learn language naturally during infancy, later referred to as the LAD (Language Acquisition Device), acquiring language rapidly, without conscious access. This provides them with an inherent understanding of linguistic principles which allows them to learn and produce language, even with limited input from caregivers or the ability to hear speech. This allows humans to produce and understand an infinite number of novel sentences from a finite number of grammatical rules. He acknowledges that the environment acts as a trigger for pre-existing structures for language learning.

Bruner supplements this idea with the LASS (Language Acquisition Support System) involving the support and 'scaffolding' by caregivers. This involves correction of poor language, expanding vocabulary, modelling sentences, and prompting of speech.

=== Empathy ===
Empathy involves the ability to recognize one's own and others feelings, and regulate emotional response accordingly. In the first few days of life, babies are able to discriminate distress cues by human voices and cry when other babies cry. From 3–7 months, infants can identify sad vocalizations and facial expressions. From 5–10 months, they show a preference for prosocial characters in shows, being aversive to harm caused by others. Children at 24 months are aware of their wrongdoing, and show shame-like responses from 29 months. Infants with a secure attachment, related to consistent parental care, appear to show more empathy. This suggests that empathy is not an automatically developed skill, but one that is activated based on experience.

=== Metacognition ===
==== Self-awareness ====
The most common technique used in research for testing self-awareness in infants is a mirror test known as the "Rouge Test". The rouge test works by applying a dot on an infant's face and then placing them in front of the mirror. If the infant investigates the dot on their nose by touching it, they are thought to realize their own existence and have achieved self-awareness. A number of research studies have used this technique and shown self-awareness to develop between 15 and 24 months of age. Some researchers take language such as "I, me, my, etc." as an indicator of self-awareness.

Rochat (2003) described a more in-depth developmental path in acquiring self-awareness through various stages. He described self-awareness as occurring in 5 stages beginning from birth.

Stage	Description
Stage 1 – Differentiation (from birth)	Right from birth infants are able to differentiate the self from the non-self. A study using the infant rooting reflex found that infants rooted significantly less from self-stimulation, contrary to when the stimulation came from the experimenter.
Stage 2 – Situation (by 2 months)	In addition to differentiation, infants at this stage can also situate themselves in relation to a model. In one experiment infants were able to imitate tongue orientation from an adult model. Additionally, another sign of the differentiation is when infants bring themselves into contact with objects by reaching for them.
Stage 3 – Identification (by 2 years)	At this stage the more common definition of "self-awareness" comes into play, where infants can identify themselves in a mirror through the "rouge test" as well as begin to use language to refer to themselves.
Stage 4 – Permanence	This stage occurs after infancy when children are aware that their sense of self continues to exist across both time and space.
Stage 5 – Self-consciousness or meta-self-awareness	This also occurs after infancy. This is the final stage when children can see themselves in 3rd person, or how they are perceived by others.

==== Symbolic thought ====
Symbolic thought refers to the ability to use words, images, and other symbols to represent words or feelings. During the preoperational stage a child's capacity for symbolism increases, this is shown by their increase in language use during this stage. This can also be seen by the way children play with objects, a stick becomes a sword and a box becomes armor. Children in this stage still might not understand that a map represents a real place, and that a picture of food does not have a smell.

==== Theory of mind ====
Theory of mind refers to the ability to understand and predict what others are thinking and feeling, involving recognizing that others have different beliefs. First order theory of mind refers to one's ability to understand their own mental life, while second order theory of mind refers to one's ability to understand the mental lives of others.

Infants show early signs of understanding belief-related situations. However, they are generally thought to possess implicit mentalization—fast, non-conscious, and non-verbal—rather than explicit mentalization, which is slower, conscious, verbal, and typically emerges around 4 years of age. Implicit mentalization includes, for example, the ability to recognize when a communicative partner has incorrect or incomplete information about a relevant aspect of the world. Multiple independent studies suggest that, in such situations, infants communicate more frequently and accurately to share their knowledge with others. However, infants do not consistently perform well on tasks that require them to predict others' behavior based on false beliefs, as reflected in the difficulty of replicating some of these findings.

Children with Autism struggle with theory of mind, showing mindblindness, a difficulty understanding other people's thoughts and feelings, finding other individuals confusing and unpredictable. This is seen where autistic children show less pretend play and lower joint attention.

==== Executive function ====
Executive function is a high-order cognitive ability, which allows you to sustain, switch and inhibit cognitive functions. It is involved in the processes of coordination, planning and goal-directed actions. Executive function emerges in the first year of life, and strengthens throughout childhood and adolescence. Cognitive abilities in infancy are predictive of executive functions at age 11, having long-term implications on memory and attention.

== Cultural differences in development ==
Most of the key stages of infant cognitive development appear universal across many cultures, emerging reliability and at similar times. However there appears to be a lack of uniformity across how and when these abilities develop, including differences in cognitive styles and pathways of development which are dependent on cultural beliefs and practices.

=== Executive function ===
East Asian children outperform western children in executive function, with bilingual children showing better executive function abilities than monolingual children. The executive function advantage of eastern cultures can be contributed to a number of factors:

Value systems - Eastern education systems can promote higher processing speeds. The routines and hobbies of eastern cultures may also improve executive function, requiring speed and flexibility.

Parenting norms - Emotional socialization in eastern parenting promotes earlier and better executive function.

Language - bilingualism and high language proficiency increases executive function.

=== Memory ===
While basic memory development and processes are universal, the content, organization and expression of memory is influenced by culture. For example, verbal scaffolding and linear memory styles in the west promote improved autobiographical memory in western children. In the east, repetitive and directive memory styles promote recall of social events, making memory thematic and holistic.

=== Language ===
Parents in the west practice more infant-directed speech, encouraging early verbal interaction and faster language development. Eastern children who experience less direct verbal interaction and more observation of speech than practice may be slower to develop speech.

Internationally adopted children experience delays in speech development due to the abrupt shift in linguistic and cultural environment, becoming exposed to a new language in the process of second first language acquisition. While most catch-up by age 2, they appear weaker in vocabulary depth and complex grammar

== Notes ==
- The Structures of the Common-Sense World
- Evolutionary Psychology: A Primer
