= Susan Hespos =

American developmental psychologist

Susan J. Hespos
- Education: Reed College (BA); Emory University (MA, PhD)
- Scientific career
- Fields: Psychology, cognitive science, developmental psychology
- Workplaces: Western Sydney University

Susan J. Hespos is an American developmental psychologist serving as the professor of infant studies and leader of BabyLab in the MARCS Institute for Brain, Behaviour, and Development, as well as the School of Education at Western Sydney University.

Hespos's research shows that babies think before they speak. Her work provides the earliest evidence of cognitive abilities in infants and illustrates how early thinking establishes the foundation for adult reasoning. She has used a range of methods and has studied individuals of various ages and cultures. She advocates for a theoretical perspective known as core knowledge, which asserts that beneath the differences among humans lies a set of perceptual and conceptual capacities that are shared.

Hespos has served as associate editor for Developmental Psychology (2016 – 2020), Associate Editor for Cognitive Psychology (2022 – 2024), and a member of the editorial board of Psychological Science (since 2020).

== Education and career ==
Hespos earned a B.A. in psychology from Reed College in 1990, a M.A. in cognitive psychology in 1993, and a Ph.D. in Developmental Psychology in 1996, from Emory University. She secured a competitive grant from the National Institute of Health (NIH) for postdoctoral research at the University of Illinois at Urbana-Champaign, USA, with Renée Baillargeon. After two years, she transitioned to a postdoctoral position at Massachusetts Institute of Technology with Elizabeth Spelke and was awarded the McDonnell-Pew Junior Scientist Award. From 2001 to 2005, she joined Vanderbilt University as an assistant professor. In 2005, she joined the Psychology Department at Northwestern University in Evanston, Illinois, USA. Over the next 18 years, she advanced through the ranks of assistant, associate, and full professor.

From 2020 to 2022, Hespos served in a partial appointment role at Western Sydney University as the Leader of the MARCS BabyLab. In 2023, she moved to Sydney to take a full-time position at the MARCS Institute of Brain, Behaviour and Development and School of Education.

At Northwestern, Hespos completed three-year terms as both the director of graduate studies and the director of the Cognitive Division. At the MARCS Institute, she serves as the director of impact and engagement.

== Media ==
Hespos has been interviewed, and her research has been highlighted in media outlets, including science documentaries like Netflix's "Babies" (Part 2, Episode 1), radio shows such as NPR, and news publications including the Los Angeles Times, HuffPost, The Economist, ABC, and Scientific American.

== Research ==
Hespos's research focuses on the nature of early representation abilities, and the process of developmental change. She employs behavioral and neuroscience methods to ask infants questions about how they understand their world, shedding light on the basic principles that guide cognition and learning throughout the lifespan. Her infant research specifies the nature of thinking in young infants to advance understanding of two things: how language capitalizes on pre-existing cognitive abilities and how these abilities relate to the cognitive abilities of other species.

Hespos's research with children has shown that guided play promotes the development of cognitive skills (such as language and reading), social skills (like emotion regulation), and quantitative skills (including mathematics and spatial reasoning).

She has highlighted how everyday interactions with young children—such as describing objects during a walk, singing songs, or telling stories—can enhance their vocabularies, prepare them for school, and create a strong foundation for lifelong learning. Her work is part of Playful Learning Landscapes, a global initiative that engages low-income communities in transforming public spaces into learning opportunities beyond formal education.

== Selected articles ==
- Simon, Tony J.; Hespos, Susan J.; Rochat, Philippe (April 1995). "Do infants understand simple arithmetic? A replication of Wynn (1992)". Cognitive Development. 10 (2): 253–269. doi:10.1016/0885-2014(95)90011-X.
- Rochat, Philippe; Hespos, Susan J. (September 1997). "Differential rooting response by neonates: evidence for an early sense of self". Early Development and Parenting. 6 (3–4): 105–112. doi:10.1002/(SICI)1099-0917(199709/12)6:3/4<105::AID-EDP150>3.0.CO;2-U.
- Hespos, Susan J; Baillargeon, Renée (March 2001). "Reasoning about containment events in very young infants". Cognition. 78 (3): 207–245. doi:10.1016/S0010-0277(00)00118-9. PMID 11124350.
- Hespos, Susan J.; Spelke, Elizabeth S. (July 2004). "Conceptual precursors to language". Nature. 430 (6998): 453–456. Bibcode:2004Natur.430..453H. doi:10.1038/nature02634. PMC 1415221. PMID 15269769.
- Ferry, Alissa L.; Hespos, Susan J.; Waxman, Sandra R. (March 2010). "Categorization in 3- and 4-Month-Old Infants: An Advantage of Words Over Tones". Child Development. 81 (2): 472–479. doi:10.1111/j.1467-8624.2009.01408.x. PMC 2910389. PMID 20438453.
- Ferry, Alissa L.; Hespos, Susan J.; Waxman, Sandra R. (17 September 2013). "Nonhuman primate vocalizations support categorization in very young human infants". Proceedings of the National Academy of Sciences. 110 (38): 15231–15235. Bibcode:2013PNAS..11015231F. doi:10.1073/pnas.1221166110. PMC 3780887. PMID 24003164.
- Hespos, Susan; Gentner, Dedre; Anderson, Erin; Shivaram, Apoorva (February 2021). "The origins of same/different discrimination in human infants". Current Opinion in Behavioral Sciences. 37: 69–74. doi:10.1016/j.cobeha.2020.10.013.
