= Naïve physics =

Untrained human perception of basic physical phenomena

Naïve physics or folk physics is the untrained human perception of basic physical phenomena. In the field of artificial intelligence the study of naïve physics is a part of the effort to formalize the common knowledge of human beings.

Many ideas of folk physics are simplifications, misunderstandings, or misperceptions of well-understood phenomena, incapable of giving useful predictions of detailed experiments, or simply are contradicted by more thorough observations. They may sometimes be true, be true in certain limited cases, be true as a good first approximation to a more complex effect, or predict the same effect but misunderstand the underlying mechanism.

Naïve physics is characterized by a mostly intuitive understanding humans have about objects in the physical world. Certain notions of the physical world may be innate.

== Examples ==
Some examples of naïve physics include commonly understood, intuitive, or everyday-observed rules of nature:

- What goes up must come down
- A dropped object falls straight down
- A solid object cannot pass through another solid object
- A vacuum sucks things towards it
- An object is either at rest or moving, in an absolute sense
- Two events are either simultaneous or they are not

Many of these and similar ideas formed the basis for the first works in formulating and systematizing physics by Aristotle and the medieval scholastics in Western civilization. In the modern science of physics, they were gradually contradicted by the work of Galileo, Newton, and others. The idea of absolute simultaneity survived until 1905, when the special theory of relativity and its supporting experiments discredited it.

== Psychological research ==
The increasing sophistication of technology makes possible more research on knowledge acquisition. Researchers measure physiological responses such as heart rate and eye movement in order to quantify the reaction to a particular stimulus. Concrete physiological data is helpful when observing infant behavior, because infants cannot use words to explain things (such as their reactions) the way most adults or older children can.

Research in naïve physics relies on technology to measure eye gaze and reaction time in particular. Through observation, researchers know that infants get bored looking at the same stimulus after a certain amount of time. That boredom is called habituation. When an infant is sufficiently habituated to a stimulus, he or she will typically look away, alerting the experimenter to his or her boredom. At this point, the experimenter will introduce another stimulus. The infant will then dishabituate by attending to the new stimulus. In each case, the experimenter measures the time it takes for the infant to habituate to each stimulus.

As an example of the use of this method, research by Susan Hespos and colleagues studied five-month-old infants' responses to the physics of liquids and solids. Infants in this research were shown liquid being poured from one glass to another until they were habituated to the event. That is, they spent less time looking at this event. Then, the infants were shown an event in which the liquid turned to a solid, which tumbled from the glass rather flowed. The infants looked longer at the new event; that is, they dishabituated.

Researchers infer that the longer the infant takes to habituate to a new stimulus, the more it violates his or her expectations of physical phenomena. When an adult observes an optical illusion that seems physically impossible, they will attend to it until it makes sense.

It is commonly believed that our understanding of physical laws emerges strictly from experience. But research shows that infants, who do not yet have such expansive knowledge of the world, have the same extended reaction to events that appear physically impossible. Such studies hypothesize that all people are born with an innate ability to understand the physical world.

Smith and Casati (1994) have reviewed the early history of naïve physics, and especially the role of the Italian psychologist Paolo Bozzi.

=== Types of experiments ===
The basic experimental procedure of a study on naïve physics involves three steps: prediction of the infant's expectation, violation of that expectation, and measurement of the results. As mentioned above, the physically impossible event holds the infant's attention longer, indicating surprise when expectations are violated.

==== Solidity ====
An experiment that tests an infant's knowledge of solidity involves the impossible event of one solid object passing through another. First, the infant is shown a flat, solid square moving from 0° to 180° in an arch formation. Next, a solid block is placed in the path of the screen, preventing it from completing its full range of motion. The infant habituates to this event, as it is what anyone would expect. Then, the experimenter creates the impossible event, and the solid screen passes through the solid block. The infant is confused by the event and attends longer than in probable event trial.

==== Occlusion ====
An occlusion event tests the knowledge that an object exists even if it is not immediately visible. Jean Piaget originally called this concept object permanence. When Piaget formed his developmental theory in the 1950s, he claimed that object permanence is learned, not innate. The children's game peek-a-boo is a classic example of this phenomenon, and one which obscures the true grasp infants have on permanence. To disprove this notion, an experimenter designs an impossible occlusion event. The infant is shown a block and a transparent screen. The infant habituates, then a solid panel is placed in front of the objects to block them from view. When the panel is removed, the block is gone, but the screen remains. The infant is confused because the block has disappeared indicating that they understand that objects maintain location in space and do not simply disappear.

==== Containment ====
A containment event tests the infant's recognition that an object that is bigger than a container cannot fit completely into that container. Elizabeth Spelke, one of the psychologists who founded the naïve physics movement, identified the continuity principle, which conveys an understanding that objects exist continuously in time and space. Both occlusion and containment experiments hinge on the continuity principle. In the experiment, the infant is shown a tall cylinder and a tall cylindrical container. The experimenter demonstrates that the tall cylinder fits into the tall container, and the infant is bored by the expected physical outcome. The experimenter then places the tall cylinder completely into a much shorter cylindrical container, and the impossible event confuses the infant. Extended attention demonstrates the infant's understanding that containers cannot hold objects that exceed them in height.

=== Baillargeon's research ===
The published findings of Renee Baillargeon brought innate knowledge to the forefront in psychological research. Her research method centered on the visual preference technique. Baillargeon and her followers studied how infants show preference to one stimulus over another. Experimenters judge preference by the length of time an infant will stare at a stimulus before habituating. Researchers believe that preference indicates the infant's ability to discriminate between the two events.

== See also ==
- Cartoon physics
- Common sense
- Elizabeth Spelke
- Folk biology
- Folk psychology
- Renee Baillargeon
- Weak ontology
