= Cognitive ontology =

Applied ontology of human cognition

Cognitive ontology is ontology (study of being) which begins from features of human cognition directly, as opposed to its collective summary which is reflected in language. The more radical forms of it challenge also the central position of mathematics as "just another language" which biases human cognition. Perceptual psychology is a very closely related field, as it studies the limits of what humans can perceive. Barry Smith is perhaps the principal developer of this field, and has also developed the related topic of naïve physics.
