= Preferential looking =

Psychology research method

Preferential looking is an experimental method in developmental psychology used to gain insight into the young mind/brain. The method as used today was developed by the developmental psychologist Robert L. Fantz in the 1960s.

== The Preferential Looking Technique ==
According to the American Psychological Association, the preferential looking technique is "an experimental method for assessing the perceptual capabilities of nonverbal individuals (e.g., human infants, nonhuman animals)". If the average infant looks longer at a novel stimulus compared to a familiar stimulus, this suggests that the infant can discriminate between the stimuli. This method has been used extensively in cognitive science and developmental psychology to assess the character of infants' perceptual systems, and, by extension, innate cognitive faculties. An investigator or examiner observes an infant's eye movements to determine which stimulus the infant fixates on.

== Robert L. Fantz ==
Robert L. Fantz (1925-1981) was a developmental psychologist who launched several studies on infant perception including the preferential looking paradigm. Fantz introduced this paradigm in 1961 while working at the Case Western Reserve University. The preferential looking paradigm is used in studies of infants regarding cognitive development and categorization. Fantz's study showed that infants looked at patterned images longer than uniform images. He later built upon his study in 1964 to include habituation situations. These situations exhibited an infants preference for new or unusual stimuli.

== Summary of Findings ==
Conclusions have been drawn from preferential looking experiments about the knowledge that infants possess. For example, if infants discriminate between rule-following and rule-violating stimuli— say, by looking longer, on average, at the latter than the former— then it has sometimes been concluded that infants know the rule.

An example serves to illustrate the point: 100 infants are shown an object that appears to teleport, violating the rule that objects move in continuous paths. Another 100 similar infants are shown an object that behaves in a nearly identical manner to the object from group 1, except that this object does not teleport. If the former stimulus induces longer looking times than the latter, then, so the argument goes, infants expect that objects obey the continuity rule, and are surprised when objects seem to violate this rule.

Findings from preferential looking experiments have suggested that humans innately possess sets of beliefs about how objects interact ("folk physics" or "folk mechanics") and about how animate beings interact ("folk psychology").

== The Preferential Looking Technique at Work ==
A 2018 study collected data using a preferential looking paradigm. The paradigm was analyzing eye movements and pupil dilation to assess children's recognition of different degrees of labels and objects with different degrees of mismatching qualities. The findings support a sensitivity to phonological mismatch in children. The study also provided support for the hypothesis that early comprehension and knowledge of root words aid in converting subphonemic detail to unfamiliar words.

Using the preferential looking paradigm, Fantz and Simon B. Miranda conducted a study in 1974 that assessed recognition memory in infants with Down’s syndrome compared to typically developed infants (Miranda & Fantz, 1974). Each group of infants were presented with three problems of multidimensional visual stimuli. The findings were that infants with Down’s syndrome were able to discriminate between novel and familiar visual stimuli but were around two months behind typical infant development.

Preferential looking experiments have been cited in support of hypotheses regarding a wide range of inborn cognitive capacities such as depth perception, face perception, and basic arithmetic (numeracy).

== Labs using preferential looking ==
- UIUC
- CWRU (Fantz, later Fagan et al.)

== Studies employing preferential looking ==
- Ball, W.A. (April 1973). "The perception of causality in the infant". Society for Research in Child Development. Paper presented in Philadelphia.

== See also ==
- Cognitive science
- Habituation
