= Data classification =

Data classification may refer to:

- Data classification (data management)
- Data classification (business intelligence)
- Classification (machine learning), classification of data using machine learning algorithms
- Assigning a level of sensitivity to classified information
- In computer science, the data type of a piece of data

== See also ==
- Classification (disambiguation)
- Categorization
