= Galaxy classification =

Galaxy classification is classification by means of and for the discipline of astronomy.

- galaxy morphological classification
- galaxy AGN classification (galaxy active galactic nucleus classification)
