= Wax argument =

Thought experiment

The wax argument or the sheet of wax example is a thought experiment that René Descartes created in the second of his Meditations on First Philosophy. He devised it to analyze what properties are essential for bodies, show how uncertain our knowledge of the world is compared to our knowledge of our minds, and argue for rationalism.

== The thought experiment ==
Descartes first considers all the sensible properties of a sheet of wax such as its shape, texture, size, color, and smell. He then points out that all these properties change as the wax is moved closer to a fire. The only properties that necessarily remain are extension, changeability and movability:

Let us begin by considering the commonest matters, those which we believe to be the most distinctly comprehended, to wit, the bodies which we touch and see; not indeed bodies in general, for these general ideas are usually a little more confused, but let us consider one body in particular. Let us take, for example, this piece of wax: it has been taken quite freshly from the hive, and it has not yet lost the sweetness of the honey which it contains; it still retains somewhat of the odour of the flowers from which it has been culled; its colour, its figure, its size are apparent; it is hard, cold, easily handled, and if you strike it with the finger, it will emit a sound. Finally all the things which are requisite to cause us distinctly to recognise a body, are met with in it. But notice that while I speak and approach the fire what remained of the taste is exhaled, the smell evaporates, the colour alters, the figure is destroyed, the size increases, it becomes liquid, it heats, scarcely can one handle it, and when one strikes it, no sound is emitted. Does the same wax remain after this change? We must confess that it remains; none would judge otherwise. What then did I know so distinctly in this piece of wax? It could certainly be nothing of all that the senses brought to my notice, since all these things which fall under taste, smell, sight, touch, and hearing, are found to be changed, and yet the same wax remains.

Perhaps it was what I now think, viz. that this wax was not that sweetness of honey, nor that agreeable scent of flowers, nor that particular whiteness, nor that figure, nor that sound, but simply a body which a little while before appeared to me as perceptible under these forms, and which is now perceptible under others. But what, precisely, is it that I imagine when I form such conceptions? Let us attentively consider this, and, abstracting from all that does not belong to the wax, let us see what remains. Certainly nothing remains excepting a certain extended thing which is flexible and movable.

— René Descartes, 1911 edition of The Philosophical Works of Descartes (Cambridge University Press), translated by Elizabeth S. Haldane

These properties are, however, not directly perceived through the senses or imagination (the wax can be extended and moved in more ways than can be imagined). Instead, to grasp the essence of the wax, it must be done through pure reason:

We must then grant that I could not even understand through the imagination what this piece of wax is, and that it is my mind alone which perceives it.

— René Descartes, 1911 edition of The Philosophical Works of Descartes (Cambridge University Press), translated by Elizabeth S. Haldane

== See also ==
- Object permanence
- Ship of Theseus
