= Paolo Bozzi =

Italian psychologist (1930–2003)

Paolo Bozzi (May 16, 1930 – October 11, 2003) was an Italian psychologist, philosopher, composer, and violin player. He was born in Gorizia and died in Bolzano.

He made several important discoveries in psychology of perception and thought, most notably the phenomenon of auditory streaming. He was one of the first to defend the idea of a systematic study of naïve physics, and a precursor of experimental philosophy.
