= Robert L. Fantz =

American developmental psychologist (1925–1981)

Robert Lowell Fantz (1925–1981) was an American developmental psychologist who pioneered several studies into infant perception. In particular, the preferential looking paradigm introduced by Fantz in the 1961 is widely used in cognitive development and categorization studies among small babies.

Working at the Case Western Reserve University, Fantz introduced in 1961 the visual preference paradigm - showing that infants look longer at patterned (e.g. checkered) images rather than uniform images. An innovation in this task was the measurement of the duration of the infant gaze rather than just the direction of first gaze. In 1964, Fantz extended this idea to habituation situations, to show that over multiple exposures to the same and a different image, the infant gradually exhibited a preference for the novel stimulus. The researcher could now estimate an infant's discriminatory and perceptual capability by showing different images in highly controlled situations, often within a stagelike box, and observing which changes in the scenarios the infant would perceive as novel.

The American Psychological Foundation has instituted the annual Robert Fantz Memorial Award for research in "perceptual-cognitive development and the development of selective attention"; and also "development of individuality, creativity, and free-choice of behavior."
