= Shared intentionality =

Psychological concept

Shared intentionality is a concept in psychology that describes the human capacity to engage with the psychological states of others. According to conventional wisdom in cognitive sciences, shared intentionality supports the development of everything from cooperative interactions and knowledge assimilation to moral identity and cultural evolution that provides building societies, being a pre-requisite of social reality formation.

Knowledge about shared intentionality has been developing since the last century's end. This psychological construct was introduced in the 1980s with a straightforward definition of sharing psychological states among participants without attributing to age when it begins. The development of knowledge on mother-child interactions has revealed additional attributes about appearing shared intentionality; it showed this capacity enables one-year-olds to study environment. Later, Tomasello et al. specified that, even at birth, infants grasp shared intentionality with caregivers – this ability to share psychological states with others emerges immediately after birth. Tomasello hypothesized that shared intentionality, from the very first emotional exchanges after birth, drives the gradual strengthening of social bonds between children and caregivers.

In 2022, Michael Tomasello received the David Rumelhart Prize 2022 in the Cognitive Science Society as an award for his insights into cognition evolution and, specifically, the knowledge development about a contribution of shared intentionality to cognition and social reality formation.

The concept is slightly close to collective intentionality. The philosophical notion of collective intentionality defines the capability of collectives to form co-intentions when individuals become jointly directed at objects, matters of fact, states of affairs, goals, or values. This co-intention occurs when two or more individuals undertake an aware task together. It is thought that collective intentionality is the conscious ability of minds to be jointly directed at a goal. It only implies aware intentions–the causal antecedents of action. Only three or four-year-old children, after years of continuous interaction with others, can develop the ability for collective intentionality, which acts as the comprehension of cultural institutions based on collective beliefs and practices. In contrast, the psychological construct of shared intentionality describes unaware processes during social learning at the onset of life, when organisms in the simple reflexes substage of the sensorimotor stage of cognitive development do not possess abstract thinking. This difference between the two concepts implies the possibility of two different neurophysiological processes underlying their appearance.

In recent years, the psychological construct of shared intentionality is being explored from different perspectives by studying: e.g., the cognitive processes involved in creating and sustaining cooperative group activity, collaborative neuronal activity in inter-brain neuroscience studies, and group performance in psychophysiological studies. However, the nature of the interaction in shared intentionality is unclear, since it occurs even in infants, organisms at the simple reflexes stage of development.

== Definitions ==
In classical thought, a definition is a statement of a thing's essence. Shared intentionality is a latent variable that can only be inferred indirectly. The definition of this psychological construct should be carefully considered because the translational impact of research relies on how we define this implicit phenomenon. The definition of shared intentionality should constitute further research directions, e.g., for understanding the neurophysiological processes underlying cooperative targeting in individuals. The study on shared intentionality began by understanding the phenomenon as the ability to enable coordinated, collaborative interactions made possible by a motivation to share mental states. However, because this mutual comprehension of a target succeeds in even newborns, the essence of the phenomenon is unclear. The definition should explain meanings of such a fundamental for this construct constituent as the mode of how this sharing of mental states may occur, considering the age of the organism exhibiting this ability. The initial definition left unclear how infants are able to perceive shared intentionality while they cannot provide communication through sensory cues at the beginning of social learning. Even the essence of a mental state at this developmental stage needs clarification.

Based on recent insights in neuroscience research, a hypothesis of neurophysiological grounds of shared intentionality specified that this collaborative interaction emerges in the mother-child pairs at birth for sharing the essential sensory stimulus of the actual cognitive problem. This social bond enables ecological training of immature organisms, starting at the simple reflexes substage of the sensorimotor stage of cognitive development.

== Contributions ==
Shared intentionality is a driver of environmental learning of organisms at the onset of cognition. The significance of this notion is that it defines pre-perceptual communication, which contributes to the assimilation of initial environmental knowledge in the period when organisms cannot communicate through sensory cues. In this stage, organisms are not even able to target; they can show goal-directed behavior in primitive reflexes only. Even a perception of objects cannot appear on its own independently in this developmental stage. The organisms should gain a holistic representation of the environment before beginning perception for then successfully processing the organization, identification, and interpretation of sensory information. This explanation of shared intentionality significance also yields an analytical reasoning of why it is defined as an unaware interaction in which the immature recipient organism experiences the ability to select the only stimulus that the mature contributor organism is targeting.

An explanation of neurophysiological processes during this initial interaction is intriguing as much as essential since it reveals perspectives for understanding perception and consciousness and even promotes advances in many fields of knowledge, from biomedicine to artificial intelligence. In medicine, evaluation of shared intentionality magnitude in mother-child dyad can contribute to assessing children's cognitive development. Progress in knowledge of underlying processes of shared intentionality can provide management of artificial neural networks of intelligent prosthetic limbs via a bond with the human sensorimotor network. The feasibility of integrating the human brain with a computer shows the way to a new stage in artificial intelligence design.

== Neurophysiological hypothesis ==
Nowadays, only one hypothesis tends to explain neurophysiological processes during shared intentionality in integrative complexity from cellular to interpersonal dynamics levels. According to Val Danilov, Shared intentionality emerges in the mother (contributor) and child (recipient) dyad under specific conditions that match the mother-fetus communication model. This model of interaction between closely related organisms is described by the following attributes: (i) social learning in a lack of meaningful sensory interaction between them; (ii) unintelligible stimuli (for the recipient) in a shared ecological context; (iii) a single low-frequency harmonic oscillator.

In the beginning, interpersonal dynamics in these relative organisms maintain the inherited mechanism of social entrainment of the recipient to the contributor's socio-biological rhythm, synchronizing physiological processes in these organisms. Therefore, at the cellular level, a coordination of gamma neuronal activity in each organism occurs in similar separate networks of different subsystems that are relevant to the interpersonal dynamics of these organisms in the specific ecological context.

The increased heartbeats of the contributor (low-frequency oscillator) coordinate central and peripheral gamma temporal coordination in each organism by nesting gamma oscillations of local networks (interference of delta and gamma waves). The similarly modulated local gamma-temporal coordination in different brain zones of the different nervous systems provides a coordinated neuronal activity that can provide integrated neuronal processing. So, because of the interpersonal dynamics, shared ecological context, and the low-frequency oscillator, cells and even their networks in different nervous systems behave coordinately (nonlocal neuronal coupling), and the integrated neuronal processing in all organisms is similar. In these conditions, each intentional act of the contributor becomes a template for the recipient's nervous system–the "instructions" about synaptic structural organisation corresponding to a specific sensory stimulus.

In short, the mother's heartbeats can synchronize brain gamma waves of already excited central and peripheral neuronal ensembles, similar in both organisms due to physiological entrainment being in the shared ecosystem, and, due to this physiological harmony, specific sensorimotor networks activation in the mother entrain those in the child; and because of the shared ecosystem, this engagement trains the young nervous system to respond correctly to certain sensory stimuli through statistical mechanisms based on numerous successful trials and errors. In such a manner, an intentional act of the contributor simultaneously becomes an appearance of subliminal perception in the recipient. Therefore, nonlocal neuronal coupling provides subliminal perception in the recipient, similar to the intentional act of the contributor. Shared intentionality gives the recipient a direct clue for the relevant stimulus, providing pre-perceptual communication.

It is believed that the prerequisite of Shared intentionality is pre-perceptual multimodal integration that emerges even during gestation. In fetuses, cognition and emotion development begins with the association of affective cues with stimuli responsible for activating the neural pathways of simple reflexes due to non-local neuronal coupling (see above). The emotion-reflex stimuli conjunction contributes to the further development of the simple innate neuronal assemblies, shaping the emotional neuronal patterns in statistical learning that are continuously connected with the neuronal pathways of reflexes.

The Shared intentionality approach attempts to combine Externalism with empiricist ideas of the beginning of cognition through learning in the environment. According to this group of positions in the philosophy of mind (Externalism), communicative symbols are encoded in local topological properties of neuronal maps, which reflect a dynamic model of action. The sensorimotor neural network allows the relevant cue to be connected to a specific symbol stored in sensorimotor structures, which reveals embodied meanings. From this perspective, the hypothesis of Shared intentionality also complements the Core Knowledge Theory, even being the self-sufficient and independent hypothesis.

== See also ==
- Binding problem
- Categorization
- Child development
- Cognition
- Cognitive development
- Cognitive model § Mother-fetus cognitive model
- Collective behaviour
- Collective intentionality
- Infant cognitive development
- Multisensory integration
- Perception
- Social cognition
- Extended mind thesis § Empirical evidence
