= Renée Baillargeon =

Canadian American developmental psychologist

- Born: 1954 (age 71–72); Quebec, Canada
- Education: McGill University
- Alma mater: University of Pennsylvania
- Known for: Development of cognition in infancy
- Awards: Boyd R. McCandless Young Scientist Award from the American Psychological Association
- Scientific career
- Fields: Psychology
- Institutions: University of Illinois Urbana-Champaign
- Thesis: (1981)
- Doctoral advisor: Rochel Gelman and Elizabeth Spelke
- Website: University of Illinois profile

Renée Baillargeon (French: [ʁəne bajaʁʒɔ̃]; born 1954) is a Canadian American research psychologist. A distinguished professor of Psychology at the University of Illinois Urbana-Champaign, Baillargeon specializes in the development of cognition in infancy. Educated at McGill University and the University of Pennsylvania, Baillargeon is the recipient of the American Psychological Association's Boyd R. McCandless Young Scientist Award.

== Life and career ==
Born in Quebec, Canada, Baillargeon is the third child of French-Canadian parents. She is best known for her research showing that infants have an intuitive awareness of physical laws such as solidity, containment, and occlusion at a young age. However, her research interests encompass a variety of issues in causal reasoning, focusing not only on the physical but also the psychological, sociomoral, and biological domains. Baillargeon received a B.A. in Psychology from McGill University in 1975 and a Ph.D. in Psychology from the University of Pennsylvania in 1981 under the supervision of Rochel Gelman and Elizabeth Spelke. Subsequently, from 1981 to 1982, Baillargeon completed a postdoctoral fellowship at MIT under the supervision of Susan Carey. She received her first academic appointment at the University of Texas at Austin in 1982, a year later she moved to the University of Illinois where she has remained since.

=== Research ===
==== Causal reasoning domains ====
Baillargeon spends much of her career researching infant development through the lens of domains. Domains are unique frameworks that allow infants to reason and learn about events. Baillargeon identifies four causal reasoning domains entitled physical reasoning, psychological reasoning, sociomoral reasoning, and biological reasoning. Each of the four domains focus on a specific expectation that infants have when witnessing a phenomenon.

== Improving understanding of infant cognition ==
Baillargeon's research on causal reasoning in infants furthered understanding concerning Piaget's theory of cognitive development. Piaget's experiments on the development of a concept of object permanence in infants required the children to manually search for the hidden object by pulling a cover off to reveal the object. Baillargeon argues that Piaget's finding regarding infants' failure to understand object permanence until 8–12 months old was rooted in a lack of motor ability as opposed to inadequate cognitive development. In an effort to account for infants' lack of motor skills, Baillargeon's studies of object permanence measure infants' fixation times on (i.e., how long they spend looking at) impossible versus possible events. Infants spent longer times looking at events that defied physical laws applied to obscured objects, implying that infants do, indeed, understand object permanence.

A study by Baillargeon and colleague Julie DeVos confirmed the concept of object permanence in infants as young as 3.5 months old. Through the use of an eye tracker, Baillargeon and DeVos concluded that the longer length of time spent looking at the taller carrot showed that 3.5-month-old infants knew the existence, height, and direction of the carrot, and they had an expectation to see the tall carrot appear over the short screen. Baillargeon uses the term "violation of expectation paradigm" to account for the surprise which infants show by gazing longer at an impossible event.

Baillargeon expresses contrasting ideas to those of her mentor Elizabeth Spelke. Although both Baillargeon and Spelke believe that children are born with some understanding of the world, Baillargeon claims that this understanding comes in the form of innate learning mechanisms while Spelke argues that infants are born with substantive knowledge regarding objects. Baillargeon claims that infants learn to reason about novel physical phenomena by forming an all or nothing concept, adding discrete and continuous variables that seem to affect the event, and lastly they reason qualitatively and quantitatively.

== Criticisms ==
Baillargeon's research on object permanence met criticism from Gregor Schoner and Esther Thelen. Schoner and Thelen argued that Baillargeon was overly extrapolating the results of her studies on infants' knowledge regarding object permanence. They believe that the violation of expectation paradigm merely signifies that infants notice a difference between the stimuli, such as more movement or different colors, as opposed to showing surprise at the sight of a seemingly impossible event. Despite these criticisms, Baillargeon's work continues to be influential in developmental psychology.

== Major works ==
- Gelman, R.; Baillargeon, R. (1983). "A review of some Piagetian concepts". Handbook of Child Psychology. Vol. 3. pp. 167–230.
- Baillargeon, R.; Spelke, E. S.; Wasserman, S. (1985). "Object permanence in five-month-old infants". Cognition. 20 (3): 191–208. doi:10.1016/0010-0277(85)90008-3. PMID 4064606. S2CID 204981310.
- Baillargeon, R (1987). "Object permanence in 3½-and 4½-month-old infants". Developmental Psychology. 23 (5): 655. doi:10.1037/0012-1649.23.5.655.
- Baillargeon, R.; Onishi, K. H. (2005). "Do 15-Month-Old Infants Understand False Beliefs?". Science. 308 (5719): 225–258. Bibcode:2005Sci...308..255O. doi:10.1126/science.1107621. PMC 3357322. PMID 15821091.
- Baillargeon, R (2002). "The acquisition of physical knowledge in infancy: A summary in eight lessons". Blackwell Handbook of Childhood Cognitive Development. Vol. 1. pp. 46–83.
- Baillargeon, R.; Scott, R. M.; He, Z. (2010). "False-belief understanding in infants". Trends in Cognitive Sciences. 14 (3): 110–118. doi:10.1016/j.tics.2009.12.006. PMC 2930901. PMID 20106714.

== Awards ==
- 1989: Boyd R. McCandless Young Scientist Award from the American Psychological Association.
- 1991: Guggenheim Fellow.
- 2007: Elected a Fellow of the American Academy of Arts and Sciences.
- 2013: Fyssen Foundation International Prize for contributing vast knowledge on the theme "Human Cognitive Development."
- 2015: Elected to the National Academy of Sciences.
