= Object permanence =

Understanding that objects exist when unobserved

Object permanence is the understanding that whether an object can be sensed has no effect on whether it continues to exist. This is a fundamental concept studied in the field of developmental psychology, the subfield of psychology that addresses the development of young children's social and mental capacities. There is not yet scientific consensus on when the understanding of object permanence emerges in human development.

Jean Piaget, the Swiss psychologist who first studied object permanence in infants, argued that it is one of an infant's most important accomplishments, as, without this concept, objects would have no separate, permanent existence. In Piaget's theory of cognitive development, infants develop this understanding by the end of the "sensorimotor stage", which lasts from birth to about two years of age. Piaget thought that an infant's perception and understanding of the world depended on their motor development, which was required for the infant to link visual, tactile and motor representations of objects. According to this view, it is through touching and handling objects that infants develop object permanence.

== Early research ==
Developmental psychologist Jean Piaget conducted experiments that collected behavioral tests on infants. Piaget studied object permanence by observing infants' reactions when a favorite object or toy was presented and then was covered with a blanket or removed from sight. Object permanence is considered to be one of the earliest methods for evaluating working memory. An infant that has started to develop object permanence might reach for the toy or try to grab the blanket off the toy. Infants that have not yet developed this might appear confused. Piaget interpreted these behavioral signs as evidence of a belief that the object had ceased to exist. Reactions of most infants that had already started developing object permanence were of frustration because they knew it existed, but did not know where it was. However, the reaction of infants that had not yet started developing object permanence was more oblivious. If an infant searched for the object, it was assumed that they believed it continued to exist.

Piaget concluded that some infants are too young to understand object permanence. A lack of object permanence can lead to A-not-B errors, where children reach for a thing at a place where it should not be. Older infants are less likely to make the A-not-B error because they are able to understand the concept of object permanence more than younger infants. However, researchers have found that A-not-B errors do not always show up consistently. They concluded that this type of error might be due to a failure in memory or the fact that infants usually tend to repeat a previous motor behavior.

== Stages ==
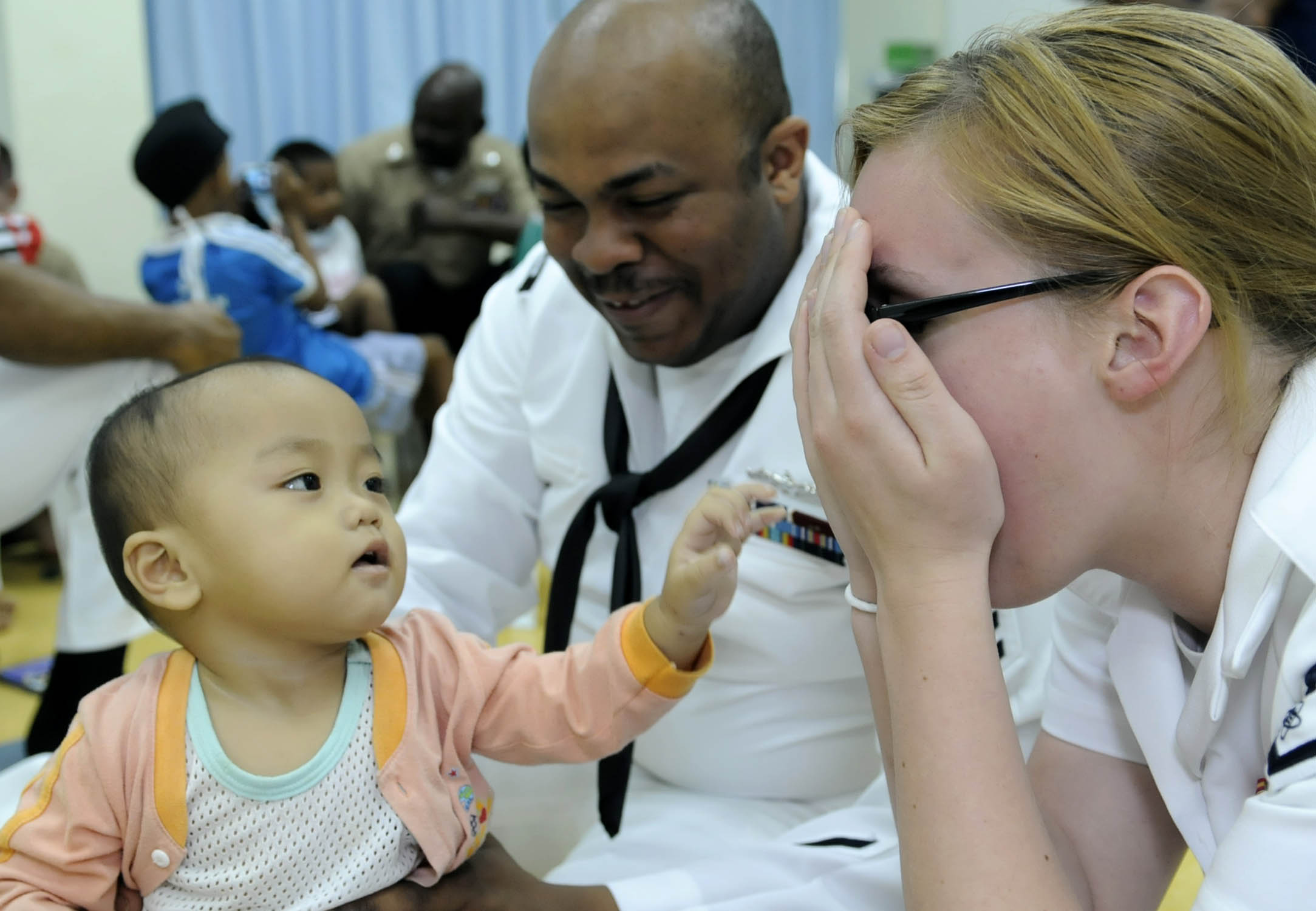
Peek-a-boo is a prime example of an object permanence test.

In Piaget's formulation, there are six stages of object permanence. These are:

1. 0–1 months: Reflex schema stage – Babies learn how the body can move and work. Vision is blurred and attention spans remain short through infancy. They are not particularly aware of objects to know they have disappeared from sight. However, babies as young as seven minutes old prefer to look at faces. The three primary achievements of this stage are sucking, visual tracking, and hand closure.
2. 1–4 months: Primary circular reactions – Babies notice objects and start following their movements. They continue to look where an object was, but for only a few moments. They 'discover' their eyes, arms, hands and feet in the course of acting on objects. This stage is marked by responses to familiar images and sounds (including parent's face) and anticipatory responses to familiar events (such as opening the mouth for a spoon). The infant's actions become less reflexive and intentionality emerges.
3. 4–8 months: Secondary circular reactions – Babies will reach for an object that is partially hidden, indicating knowledge that the whole object is still there. If an object is completely hidden, however, the baby makes no attempt to retrieve it. The infant learns to coordinate vision and comprehension. Actions are intentional, but the child tends to repeat similar actions on the same object. Novel behaviors are not yet imitated.
4. 8–12 months: Coordination of secondary circular reactions – This is deemed the most important for the cognitive development of the child. At this stage the child understands causality and is goal-directed. The very earliest understanding of object permanence emerges, as the child is now able to retrieve an object when its concealment is observed. This stage is associated with the classic A-not-B error. After successfully retrieving a hidden object at one location (A), the child fails to retrieve it at a second location (B).
5. 12–18 months: Tertiary circular reaction – The child gains means-end knowledge and is able to solve new problems. The child is now able to retrieve an object when it is hidden several times within their view, but cannot locate it when it is outside their perceptual field.
6. 18–24 months: Invention of new means through mental combination – The child fully understands object permanence. They will not fall for A-not-B errors. Also, a baby is able to understand the concept of items that are hidden in containers. If a toy is hidden in a matchbox then the matchbox put under a pillow and then, without the child seeing, the toy is slipped out of the matchbox and the matchbox then given to the child, the child will look under the pillow upon discovery that it is not in the matchbox. The child is able to develop a mental image, hold it in mind, and manipulate it to solve problems, including object permanence problems that are not based solely on perception. The child can now reason about where the object may be when invisible displacement occurs.

== Contradicting evidence ==
In more recent years, the original Piagetian object permanence account has been challenged by a series of infant studies suggesting that much younger infants do have a clear sense that objects exist even when out of sight. Bower showed object permanence in 3-month-olds. This goes against Piaget's coordination of secondary circular reactions stage because infants are not supposed to understand that a completely hidden object still exists until they are eight to twelve months old. The two studies below demonstrate this idea.

The first study showed infants a toy car that moved down an inclined track, disappeared behind a screen, and then reemerged at the other end, still on the track. The researchers created a "possible event" where a toy mouse was placed behind the tracks but was hidden by the screen as the car rolled by. Then, researchers created an "impossible event". In this situation, the toy mouse was placed on the tracks but was secretly removed after the screen was lowered so that the car seemed to go through the mouse. The infants were surprised by the impossible event, which suggests they remembered not only that the toy mouse still existed (object permanence) but also its location. Also in the 1991 study the researchers used an experiment involving two differently sized carrots (one tall and one short) in order to test the infants' response when the carrots would be moved behind a short wall. The wall was specifically designed to make the short carrot disappear, as well as tested the infants for habituation patterns on the disappearance of the tall carrot behind the wall (impossible event). Infants as young as 3 1/2 months displayed greater stimulation toward the impossible event and much more habituation at the possible event. The same was true of the tall carrot in the second experiment. This research suggests that infants understand more about objects earlier than Piaget proposed.

There are primarily four challenges to Piaget's framework:

1. Whether or not infants without disabilities actually demonstrate object permanence earlier than Piaget claimed.
2. There is disagreement about the relative levels of difficulty posed by the use of various types of covers and by different object positions.
3. Controversy concerns whether or not perception of object permanence can be achieved or measured without the motor acts that Piaget regarded as essential.
4. The nature of inferences that can be made from the A-not-B error has been challenged. Studies that have contributed to this discussion have examined the contribution of memory limitations, difficulty with spatial localization, and difficulty in inhibiting the motor act of reaching to location A on the A-not-B error.

One criticism of Piaget's theory is that culture and education exert stronger influences on a child's development than Piaget maintained. These factors depend on how much practice their culture provides in developmental processes, such as conversational skills.

== In animals ==
Experiments in non-human primates suggest that monkeys can track the displacement of invisible targets, that invisible displacement is represented in the prefrontal cortex, and that development of the frontal cortex is linked to the acquisition of object permanence. Various evidence from human infants is consistent with this. For example, formation of synapses in the frontal cortex peaks during human infancy, and recent experiments using near infrared spectroscopy to gather neuroimaging data from infants suggests that activity in the frontal cortex is associated with successful completion of object permanence tasks.

However, many other types of animals have been shown to have the ability for object permanence. These include dogs, cats, and a few species of birds such as the carrion crow, Eurasian jays, food-storing magpies and new born chickens. Dogs are able to reach a level of object permanence that allows them to find food after it has been hidden beneath one of two cups and rotated 90°. Similarly, cats are able to understand object permanence but not to the same extent that dogs can. Cats fail to understand that if they see something go into an apparatus in one direction that it will still be there if the cat tries to enter from another direction. However, while cats did not seem to be quite as good at this "invisible displacement test" as dogs are, it is hard to say whether their poorer performance is a true reflection of their abilities or just due to the way in which they have been tested. A longitudinal study found that carrion crows' ability developed gradually, albeit with slight changes in the order of mastery compared to human infants. There was only one task, task 15, that the crows were not able to master. The crows showed perseverative searches at a previously rewarded location (the so-called "A-not-B error"). They mastered visible rotational displacements consistently, but failed at more complex invisible rotational displacements. Another study tested the comparison of how long it took food-storing magpies to develop the object permanence necessary for them to be able to live independently. The research suggests that these magpies followed a very similar pattern as human infants while they were developing.

Among invertebrates, cuttlefish have been shown to possess object permanence.

== In artificial agents ==
It has been shown that artificial intelligent agents can be trained to exhibit object permanence. Building such agents revealed an interesting structure. The object permanence task involves several visual and reasoning components, where the most important ones are to detect a visible object, to learn how it moves and to reason about its movement even when it is not visible. Shamsian et al. found that object permanence was achieved when the agent had two separate time-sensitive modules, one that tracks visible objects, and a second that decides "what to track" when one object occludes or contains the target. Object permanence has further been shown to apply to videos "in the wild".

== Recent studies ==
One of the areas of focus on object permanence has been how physical disabilities (blindness, cerebral palsy and deafness) and intellectual disabilities (Down syndrome, etc.) affect the development of object permanence. In a study that was performed in 1975–76, the result shows that the only area where children with intellectual disabilities performed more weakly than children without disabilities was along the lines of social interaction. Other tasks, such as imitation and causality tasks, were performed more weakly by the children without disabilities. However, object permanence was still acquired similarly because it was not related to social interaction.

Some psychologists believe that "while object permanence alone may not predict communicative achievement, object permanence along with several other sensorimotor milestones, plays a critical role in, and interacts with, the communicative development of children with severe disabilities". This was observed in 2006, in a study recognizing where the full mastery of object permanence is one of the milestones that ties into a child's ability to engage in mental representation. Along with the relationship with language acquisition, object permanence is also related to the achievement of self-recognition. This same study also focused specifically on the effects that Down syndrome has on object permanence. They found that the reason why the children that participated were so successful in acquiring object permanence, was due to their social strength in imitation. Along with imitation being a potential factor in the success, another factor that could impact children with Down syndrome could also be the willingness of the child to cooperate.

Other, more recent studies suggest that the idea of object permanence may not be an innate function of young children. While, in reference to Piaget's theory, it has been established that young children develop object permanence as they age, the question arises: does this occur because of a particular perception that already existed within the minds of these young children? Is object permanence really an inbred response to the neural pathways developing in young minds? Studies suggest that a multitude of variables may be responsible for the development of object permanence rather than a natural talent of infants. Evidence suggests that infants use a variety of cues while studying an object and their perception of the object's permanence can be tested without physically hiding the object. Rather, the object is occluded, slightly obstructed, from the infants view and they are left only other visual cues, such as examining the object from different trajectories. It was also found that the longer an infant focuses on an object may be due to detected discontinuities in their visual field, or the flow of events, with which the infant has become familiar.

== See also ==
- Margaret Mahler § Object constancy
- Elizabeth Spelke
- Renee Baillargeon
- Solipsism
- Philosophical realism
- Idealism
- Peekaboo
- Wax argument
- Ship of Theseus
- Subjective constancy
- Theory of mind
