= Classifier =

Classifier may refer to:

== Mathematics and computing ==
- Classifier (machine learning)
- Classification rule, in statistical classification, e.g.:
  - Hierarchical classifier
  - Linear classifier
- Deductive classifier
- Classifier (UML), in software engineering
- Subobject classifier, in category theory
- Finite-state machine#Classifiers

== Other uses ==
- Classifier (linguistics), or measure word, especially in East Asian languages
  - Classifier handshape, in sign languages
- An air classifier or similar machine for sorting materials

== See also ==
- Search for all Wikipedia articles containing "classifiers"
- Classified (disambiguation)
