= Classified =

Classified may refer to:

== General ==
- Classified information, material that a government body deems to be sensitive
- Classified advertising or "classifieds"

== Music ==
- Classified (rapper) (born 1977), Canadian rapper
- The Classified, a 1980s American rock band featuring Steve Vai
- Classified Records, an American record label

=== Albums ===
- Classified (Bond album), 2004
- Classified (Classified album), 2013
- Classified (Sweetbox album), 2001
- Classified, by James Booker, 1982

=== Songs ===
- "Classified", by C. W. McCall from Wolf Creek Pass, 1975
- "Classified", by the Orb from Metallic Spheres, 2010
- "Classified", by Pete Townshend from the compilation Glastonbury Fayre, 1972
- "Classifieds", by the Academy Is... from Almost Here, 2005

== Films and television ==
- Classified (1925 film), an American silent film
- Classified: The Edward Snowden Story, a 2014 Canadian film
- Classé secret, a 2022 French Canadian TV series, also known as Classified Secret or Classified
- Classified (2024 film), a 2024 American film

== Other media ==
- Classified: The Sentinel Crisis, a 2005 video game for the Xbox

== See also ==
- Classifier (disambiguation)
