= Peekaboo =

Game played primarily with babies

Man playing peekaboo

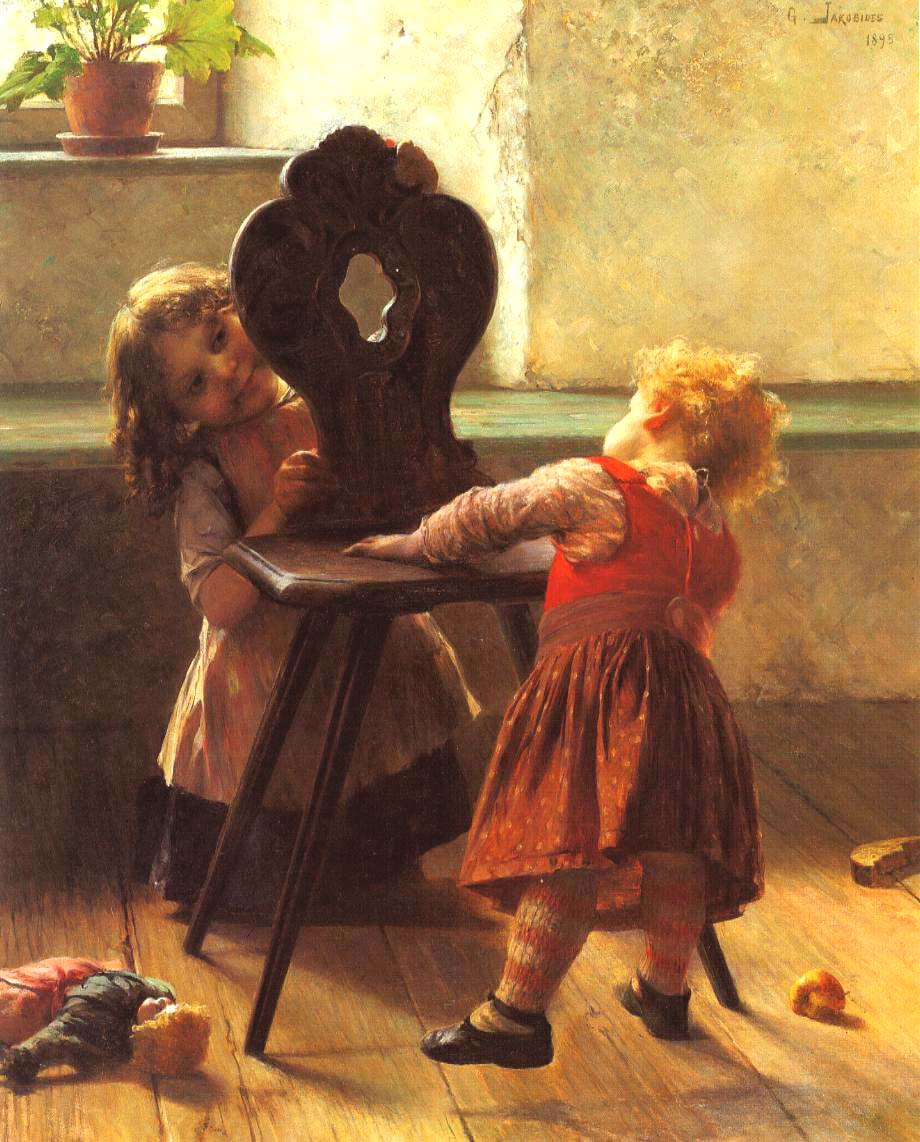
Two children playing peekaboo (1895 painting by Georgios Jakobides)

Peekaboo (also spelled peek-a-boo) is a simple game played with an infant. To play, one player hides their face, pops back into the view of the other, and says Peekaboo!, sometimes followed by I see you! There are many variations: for example, where trees are involved, "Hiding behind that tree!" is sometimes added. Another variation involves saying "Where's the baby?" while the face is covered and "There's the baby!" when uncovering the face.

Peekaboo uses a joke-like structure: surprise, balanced with expectation.

Linguist Iris Nomikou has compared the game to a dialogue given the predictable back-and-forth pattern. Other researchers have called the game “protoconversation" – a way to teach an infant the timing and the structure of social exchanges.

== Object permanence ==
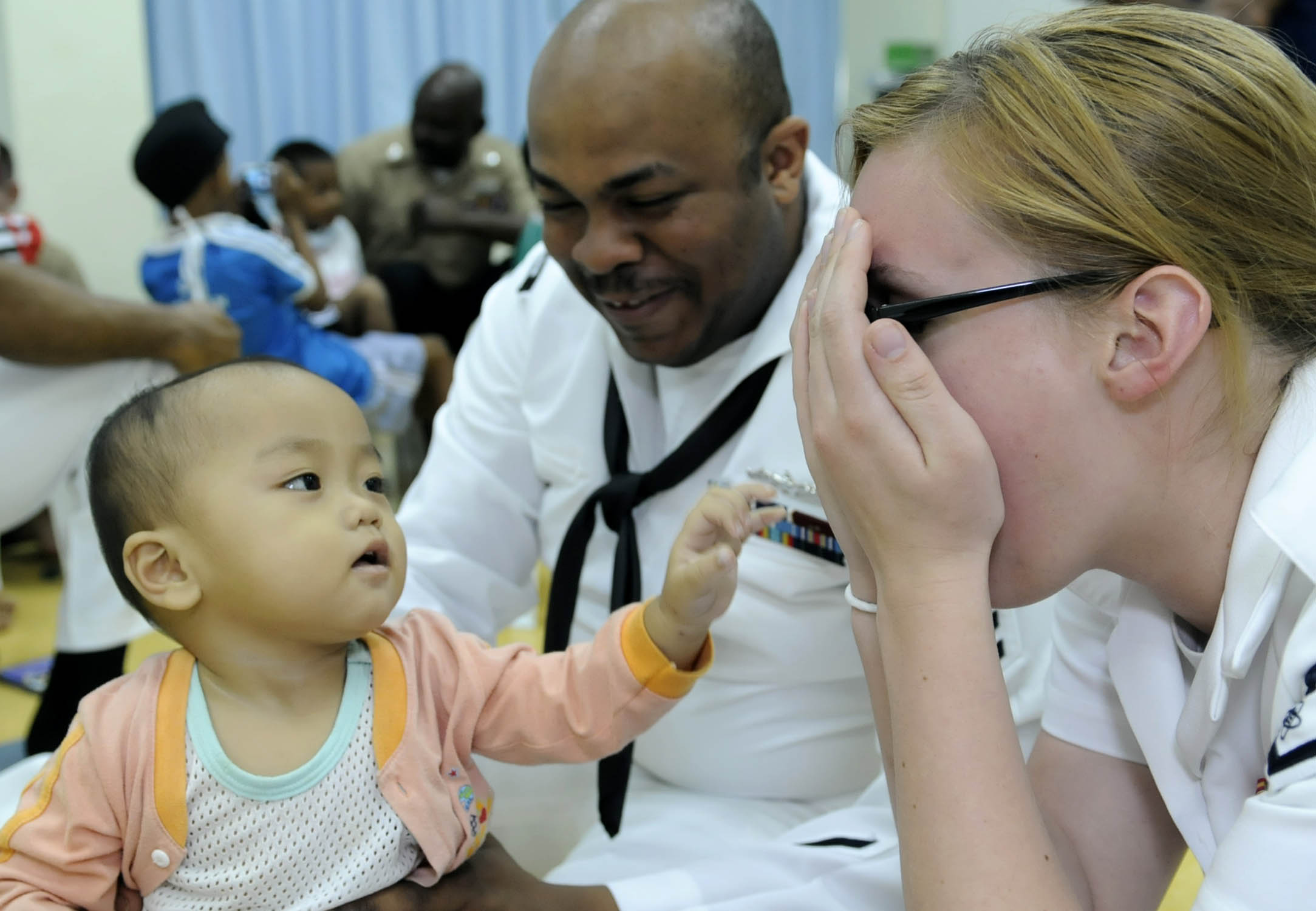
Peekaboo is a prime example of an object permanence test in childhood cognition.

Peekaboo is thought by developmental psychologists to demonstrate an infant's inability to understand object permanence. Object permanence is an important stage of cognitive development for infants. In early sensorimotor stages, the infant is completely unable to comprehend object permanence. Psychologist Jean Piaget conducted experiments with infants which led him to conclude that this awareness was typically achieved at eight to nine months of age. He said that infants before this age are too young to understand object permanence. A lack of object permanence can lead to A-not-B errors, where children reach for a thing at a place where it should not be.

== See also ==
- Hide-and-seek
- List of children's games
