= Folk biology =

Field of study

Folk biology (or folkbiology) is the cognitive study of how people classify and reason about the organic world. Folkbiological knowledge is organized into intuitive causal theories that guide how people interpret new information, draw inferences and explain the biological world. Folk classifications of plants and animals commonly form nested hierarchies, with species-like groupings included within broader categories (e.g., white oak–oak–tree).The relationship between a folk taxonomy and a scientific classification can assist in understanding how evolutionary theory deals with the apparent constancy of "common species" and the organic processes centering on them. From the vantage of evolutionary psychology, such natural systems are arguably routine "habits of mind", a sort of heuristic used to make sense of the natural world.

Broad similarities in folk taxonomies coexist with both cultural and individual differences in how biological knowledge is organized and used, including the relative emphasis on taxonomic similarity and ecological relationships associated with cultural background and expertise.

== See also ==
- Folk psychology
- Naïve physics
