= A-not-B error =

Incomplete schema of object permanence

The A-not-B error is an incomplete or absent schema of object permanence, normally observed during the sensorimotor stage of Jean Piaget's theory of cognitive development.

A typical A-not-B task goes like this: An experimenter hides an attractive toy under box "A" within the baby's reach. The baby searches for the toy, looks under box "A", and finds the toy. This activity is usually repeated several times (always with the researcher hiding the toy under box "A"), which means the baby has the ability to pass the object permanence test. Then, in the critical trial, the experimenter moves the toy under box "B", also within easy reach of the baby. Babies of 10 months or younger typically make the perseveration error, meaning they look under box "A" even though they saw the researcher move the toy under box "B", and box "B" is just as easy to reach. Piaget called this phenomenon A-not-B error. This demonstrates a lack of, or incomplete, schema of object permanence, shows that the infant's cognition of the existence of the object at this time still depends on the actions he makes to the object. Children of 12 months or older (in the preoperational stage of Piaget's theory of cognitive development) typically do not make this error.

== Competing explanations ==
Traditionally, this phenomenon has been explained as the child seeing an image and remembering where it was, rather than where it is. Other accounts deal with the development of planning, reaching, and deciding things. There are also behaviorist accounts that explain the behavior in terms of reinforcement. This account argues that the repeated trials with hiding the toy in box "A" is reinforcing that specific behavior, so that the child still reaches for box "A" because the action has been reinforced before. However, this account does not explain the shift in behavior that occurs around 12 months.

Smith and Thelen used a dynamic systems approach to the A-not-B task. They found that various components of the activity (strength of memory trace, salience of targets, waiting time, stance) combine in the "B"-trial (where the object is hidden in the "B" location rather than "A") so the child either correctly or incorrectly searches for the toy. They experimentally manipulated the task to see if they could make 10-month-old babies (who typically make the perseverative error of searching at "A") perform like 12-month-old babies (who typically search correctly). Changing the stance of the baby (sitting or standing) was one manipulation they found could make the 10-month-old search correctly. Just standing instead of sitting for the "B"-trial made the prior experience of searching in location "A" less salient to the child, who then searched correctly. The researchers concluded that the length of wait time was one of the crucial elements of the task that is influenced by age.

== See also ==
- Cognitive flexibility
- Peekaboo
