= Elizabeth Spelke =

American cognitive scientist

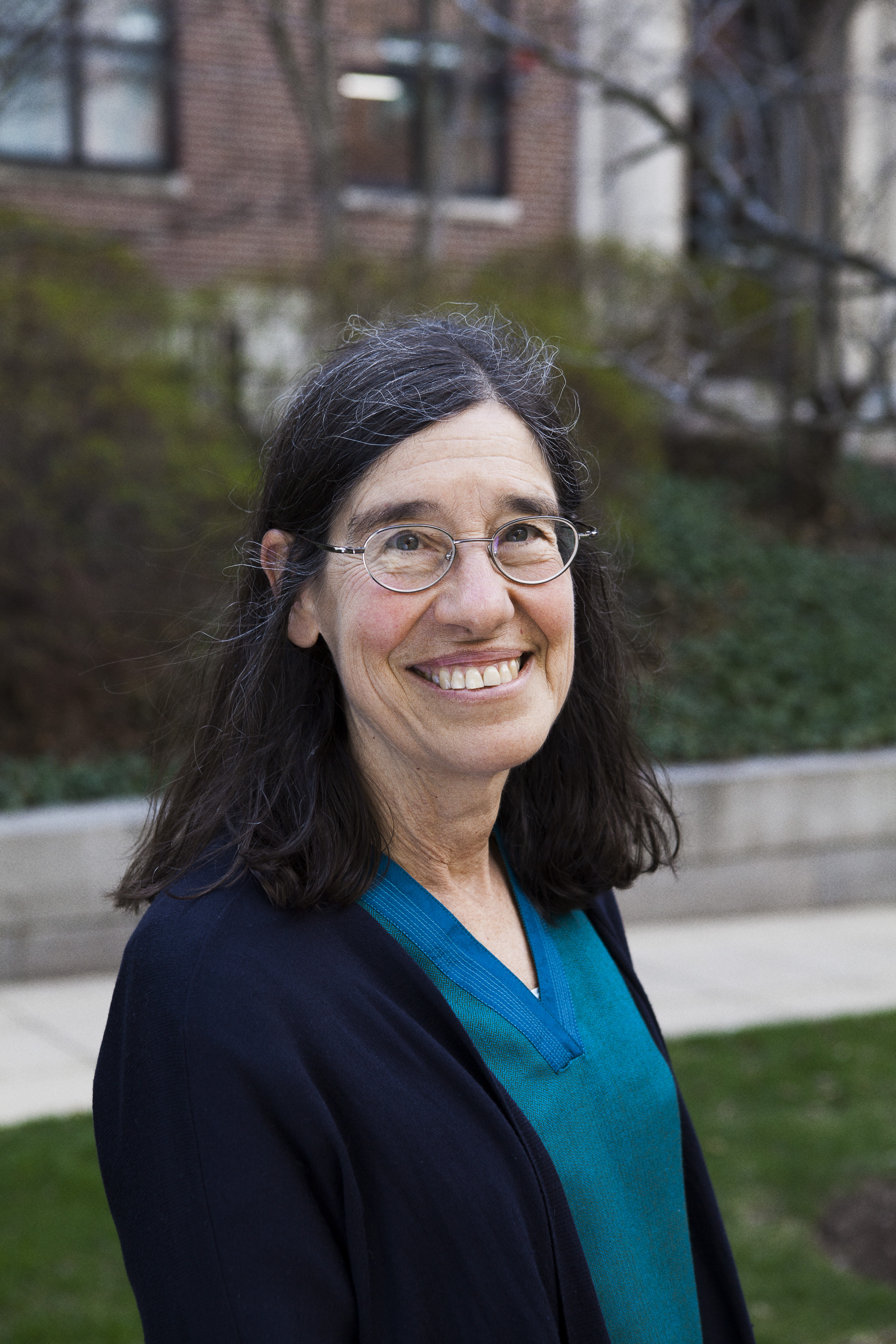
- Spelke in April 2016
- Born: May 28, 1949 (age 77)
- Education: Radcliffe College (BA); Yale University; Cornell University (MA, PhD)
- Awards: C.L. de Carvalho-Heineken Prize for Cognitive Sciences (2016)
- Scientific career
- Fields: Developmental psychology, cognitive development
- Institutions: Harvard University
- Website: http://harvardlds.org/our-labs/spelke-labspelke-lab-members/elizabeth-spelke/

Elizabeth Shilin Spelke FBA (born May 28, 1949) is an American cognitive psychologist at the Department of Psychology of Harvard University and director of the Laboratory for Developmental Studies.

Starting in the 1980s, she carried out experiments on infants and young children to test their cognitive faculties. She has suggested that human beings have a large array of innate mental abilities. In recent years, she has made important contributions to the debate on cognitive differences between men and women. She defends the position that there is no scientific evidence of any significant disparity in the intellectual faculties of males and females.

== Education and career ==
Spelke did her undergraduate studies at Radcliffe College of Harvard University with the child psychologist Jerome Kagan. Her thesis studied attachment and emotional reactions in babies. She realized that she needed to have an idea of what babies really understood, and so began her lifelong interest in the cognitive aspect of child psychology.

She did her Ph.D. at Cornell with developmental psychologist Eleanor Gibson, from whom she learned how to design experiments on young children.

Her first academic post was at the University of Pennsylvania, where she worked for nine years. Thereafter she moved first to Cornell, and then to MIT's Department of Brain and Cognitive Sciences. She has been a professor at Harvard since 2001.

Spelke was elected a Fellow of the American Academy of Arts and Sciences in 1997. She was the recipient of the 2009 Jean Nicod Prize and delivered a series of lectures in Paris hosted by the French National Centre for Scientific Research. She was elected as a Corresponding Fellow of the British Academy in 2015. In 2016 Spelke won the C.L. de Carvalho-Heineken Prize for Cognitive Sciences. Spelke was honored several times with the Honoris Causa degree in France, Netherlands, Sweden, and Uruguay.

== Research and core knowledge ==
Spelke's research focuses on the origins of human knowledge and on the early-emerging cognitive systems that allow infants to represent objects, number, space, agents and social groups. Using controlled habituation and violation-of-expectation paradigms, she and her collaborators have argued that infants possess structured expectations about the physical and social world long before they acquire language. These expectations include the idea that objects move along continuous paths, that they cannot pass through solid barriers, and that they persist when occluded.

Within the framework often called Core Knowledge Theory, Spelke has proposed that infants rely on a small set of domain-specific representational systems. These systems include mechanisms for representing inanimate objects and their causal interactions, approximate numerical magnitude, the geometry of surrounding space, goal-directed action, and the membership of individuals in social categories. According to this view, such systems are products of evolution and provide the building blocks for later-developing, more flexible forms of thought.

Spelke has also examined how language and symbolic systems interact with core knowledge. She has argued that natural language enables humans to combine information across domains—for example, linking numerical, spatial and social representations—which may explain uniquely human forms of mathematics and abstract reasoning.

== Experiments ==
The kind of experiments carried out at the Laboratory of Developmental Studies try to infer the cognitive abilities of babies by using the method of preferential looking, developed by Robert Fantz. This consists of presenting babies with different images and deducing which one is more appealing to them by the length of time their attention fixes on them.

For example, researchers may repeatedly show a baby an image with a certain number of objects. Once the baby is habituated, they present a second image with more or fewer objects. If the baby looks at the new image for a longer time, the researchers may infer that the baby can distinguish different quantities.

Through an array of similar experiments, Spelke interpreted her evidence to suggest that babies have a set of highly sophisticated, innate mental skills. This provides an alternative to the hypothesis originated by William James that babies are born with no distinctive cognitive abilities but acquire them all through education and experience (see Principles of Psychology, 1890).

== Major experimental findings ==
A number of specific paradigms developed in Spelke's laboratory have become standard tools in developmental psychology. Studies of object perception have shown that young infants integrate information about an object's motion and boundaries to individuate it from the background, and that they are surprised when objects appear to teleport or fuse together.

Work on numerical cognition, carried out with researchers such as Stanislas Dehaene, has demonstrated that infants and adults share an approximate number system that represents numerical magnitude in a ratio-dependent way. Behavioural and neuroimaging data suggest that this system is conserved across human cultures and in non-human animals, and that it provides a foundation for later symbolic mathematics.

Other lines of research have examined infants’ use of geometric information for navigation, their expectations about agents’ goal-directed actions, and their sensitivity to social categories. Together, these findings support the idea that infants represent aspects of space, agency and social structure in ways that parallel those of older children and adults.

== Influence and legacy ==
Spelke's work has played a major role in shifting debates about cognitive development away from views that saw infants as lacking structured knowledge. Her combination of rigorous experimental methods and broad theoretical claims has influenced research in fields including comparative cognition, philosophy of mind, linguistics and education. Many subsequent studies of infant cognition, both supporting and challenging the core knowledge framework, make use of paradigms first developed in her laboratory.

Her writings have also contributed to broader discussions of how evolutionary and developmental perspectives can be integrated. By emphasizing both the constraints imposed by early-emerging cognitive systems and the flexibility introduced by language and culture, Spelke has argued for a view of human cognition that is simultaneously innate and highly learnable.

== Criticism of core knowledge ==
Core Knowledge Theory has generated substantial debate. Some developmental psychologists argue that infants’ behaviours in looking-time experiments may be explained by lower-level perceptual preferences or by statistical learning over relatively short time scales, rather than by rich conceptual representations. Others contend that claims about modular, domain-specific systems are difficult to reconcile with evidence for domain-general learning mechanisms.

Critics have also questioned whether early competencies revealed in laboratory tasks translate into everyday functioning outside the controlled setting of infant studies. Spelke and her supporters respond that converging evidence across tasks, domains and species, together with cross-cultural data, points to the existence of structured early cognitive systems that guide learning rather than replace it.

== The debate on sex and intelligence ==
In 2005, Lawrence Summers, then Harvard president, speculated over the preponderance of men over women in high-end science and engineering positions. He surmised that a statistical difference in the variance of innate abilities among male and female populations (male variance tends to be higher, resulting in more extremes) could play a role. His words immediately sparked a heated debate. Spelke was among the strongest critics of Summers, and in April 2005, she faced Steven Pinker in an open debate over the issue. She declared that her own experiments revealed no difference between the mental capacities of male and female children ranging in age from 5 months to 7 years old.

== Selected publications ==
- Spelke, E. S. (1994). Initial knowledge: Six suggestions. Cognition, 50(1–3), 431–445. https://doi.org/10.1016/0010-0277(94)90039-6
- Spelke, E. S., Breinlinger, K., Macomber, J., & Jacobson, K. (1992). Origins of knowledge. Psychological Review, 99(4), 605–632. https://doi.org/10.1037/0033-295X.99.4.605
- Spelke, E. S., & Kinzler, K. D. (2007). Core knowledge. Developmental Science, 10(1), 89–96. https://doi.org/10.1111/j.1467-7687.2007.00569.x
- Dehaene, S., Spelke, E., Pinel, P., Stanescu, R., & Tsivkin, S. (1999). Sources of mathematical thinking: Behavioral and brain-imaging evidence. Science, 284(5416), 970–974. https://doi.org/10.1126/science.284.5416.970
- Spelke, E. S., & Newport, E. L. (1998). Nativism, empiricism, and the development of knowledge. Trends in Cognitive Sciences, 2(9), 359–364. https://doi.org/10.1016/S1364-6613(98)01260-6
