= Folk psychology =

Ordinary explanation and prediction regarding people's behavior and mental state

Folk psychology, commonsense psychology, or naïve psychology, is the ordinary, intuitive, or non-expert understanding, explanation, and rationalisation of people's behaviours and mental states. In philosophy of mind and cognitive science, it can also refer to the academic study of this concept. Processes and items encountered in daily life such as pain, pleasure, excitement, and anxiety use common linguistic terms as opposed to technical or scientific jargon. Folk psychology allows for an insight into social interactions and communication, thus stretching the importance of connection and how it is experienced.

Traditionally, the study of folk psychology has focused on how everyday people—those without formal training in the various academic fields of science—go about attributing mental states. This domain has primarily been centered on intentional states reflective of an individual's beliefs and desires; each described in terms of everyday language and concepts such as "beliefs", "desires", "fear", and "hope".

Belief and desire have been the main idea of folk psychology as both suggest the mental states we partake in. Belief comes from the mindset of how we take the world to be while desire comes from how we want the world to be. From both of these mindsets, our intensity of predicting others mental states can have different results.

Folk psychology is seen by many psychologists from two perspectives: the intentional stance or the regulative view. The regulative view of folk psychology insists that a person's behavior is more geared to acting towards the societal norms whereas the intentional stance makes a person behave based on the circumstances of how they are supposed to behave.

== Key folk concepts ==
=== Intentionality ===
When perceiving, explaining, or criticizing human behaviour, people distinguish between intentional and unintentional actions. An evaluation of an action as stemming from purposeful action or accidental circumstances is one of the key determinants in social interaction. Others are the environmental conditions or pre-cognitive matters. For example, a critical remark that is judged to be intentional on the part of the receiver of the message can be viewed as a hurtful insult. Conversely, if considered unintentional, the same remark may be dismissed and forgiven.

The folk concept of intentionality is used in the legal system to distinguish between intentional and unintentional behavior. When looking at an individual, there is an unconventional way of explaining behavior in law. By looking at behaviors and expressions, folk psychology is used to predict behaviors that have been acted out in the past.

The importance of this concept transcends almost all aspects of everyday life: with empirical studies in social and developmental psychology exploring perceived intentionality's role as a mediator for aggression, relationship conflict, judgements of responsibility blame or punishment.

Recent empirical literature on folk psychology has shown that people's theories regarding intentional actions involve four distinct factors: beliefs, desires, causal histories, and enabling factors. Here, beliefs and desires represent the central variables responsible for the folk theories of intention.

Desires embody outcomes that an individual seeks, including those that are impossible to achieve. The key difference between desires and intentions is that desires can be purely hypothetical, whereas intentions specify an outcome that the individual is actually trying to bring to fruition.

In terms of beliefs, there are several types that are relevant to intentions—outcome beliefs and ability beliefs. Outcome beliefs are beliefs as to whether a given action will fulfill an intention, as in "purchasing a new watch will impress my friends". Ability consists of an actor's conviction regarding their ability to perform an action, as in "I really can afford the new watch". In light of this, Heider postulated that ability beliefs could be attributed with causing individuals to form goals that would not otherwise have been entertained.

=== Regulative ===
The regulative view of folk psychology is not the same of the intentional stance of folk psychology. This point of view is primarily concerned with the norms and patterns that correspond with our behavior and applying them in social situations. Our thoughts and behaviors are often shaped by folk psychology into the normative molds that help others predict and comprehend us.

According to the regulative point of view, social roles, cultural norms, generalizations, and stereotypes are grounded on social and developmental psychology's empirical data, which is what normative structures allude to. Based on how someone displays themselves, things like how you treat babies differently from adults and boys differently from girls might foretell how people will behave or react. According to this regulative perspective, folk psychology fulfills a "curiosity state" and a satisfactory answer satisfies the needs of the inquirer.

Moral character judgements play a significant role in comprehending folk psychology from a regulative perspective. Three categories of moral character traits are assigned: virtue-labeling, narrative-based moral assessment, as well as gossiping about traits and they use different approaches to social cognition. Although character judgement is a component in folk psychology, it does not take into consideration other processes that we engage in on the daily basis.

=== Comprehension and prediction ===
==== Context model ====
Folk psychology is crucial to evaluating and ultimately understanding novel concepts and items. Developed by Medin, Altom, and Murphy, the Context Model hypothesizes that as a result of mental models in the form of prototype and exemplar representations, individuals are able to more accurately represent and comprehend the environment around them.

According to the model, the overall similarity between the prototype and a given instance of a category is evaluated based on multiple dimensions (e.g., shape, size, color). A multiplicative function modeled after this phenomenon was created.

$$s(P,E_i)=\prod_ks(P,E_{ik})$$

Here, $s(P, E_i)$ represents the similarity between the prototype and the $i$th exemplar, $k$ is the subscript for the dimensions $(k = 1, \dots, K)$, and $s(P, E_{ik})$ is the similarity between the prototype and the $i$th exemplar on the $k$th dimension.

==== Prediction model ====
There are other prediction models when it comes to the different cognitive thoughts an individual might have when trying to predict human behavior or human mental states. From Lewis, one platitude includes individuals casually expressing stimuli and behavior. The other platitude includes assuming a type of mental state another has.

==== Consequence of prediction model ====
The prediction model has received some cautions as the idea of folk psychology has been a part of Lewis's ideas. Common statements about mental health have been considered in Lewis's prediction model, therefore there was an assumed lack of quality scientific research.

=== Explanation ===
==== Conversational Model ====
Given that folk psychology represents causal knowledge associated with the mind's categorization processes, it follows that folk psychology is actively employed in aiding the explanation of everyday actions. Denis Hilton's (1990) Conversational Model was created with this causal explanation in mind, with the model having the ability to generate specific predictions. Hilton coined his model the 'conversational' model because he argued that as a social activity, unlike prediction, explanation requires an audience: to whom the individual explains the event or action. According to the model, causal explanations follow two particular conversational maxims from Grice's (1975) models of conversation—the manner maxim and the quantity maxim. Grice indicated that the content of a conversation should be relevant, informative, and fitting of the audience's gap in knowledge. Cognizant of this, the Conversational Model indicates that the explainer, upon evaluation of his audience, will modify his explanation to cater their needs. In essence, demonstrating the inherent need for mental comparison and in subsequent modification of behaviour in everyday explanations.

== Application and functioning ==
=== Belief–desire model ===
The belief–desire model of psychology illustrates one method in which folk psychology is utilized in everyday life. According to this model, people perform an action if they want an outcome and believe that it can be obtained by performing the action. However, beliefs and desires are not responsible for immediate action; intention acts as a mediator of belief/desire and action. In other words, consider a person who wants to achieve a goal, "G", and believes action "A" will aid in attaining "G"; this leads to an intention to perform "A", which is then carried out to produce action "A".

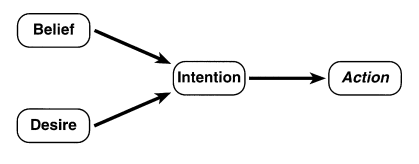
A schematic representation of folk psychology of belief, desire, intention, and action

Schank & Abelson (1977) described this inclusion of typical beliefs, desires, and intentions underlying an action as akin to a "script" whereby an individual is merely following an unconscious framework that leads to the ultimate decision of whether an action will be performed. Similarly, Barsalou (1985) described the category of the mind as an "ideal" whereby if a desire, a belief, and an intention were all present, they would "rationally" lead to a given action. They coined this phenomenon the "ideal of rational action".

=== Goal-intentional action model ===
Existing literature has widely corroborated the fact that social behavior is greatly affected by the causes to which people attribute actions. In particular, it has been shown that an individual's interpretation of the causes of behavior reflects their pre-existing beliefs regarding the actor's mental state and motivation behind their actions. It follows that they draw on the assumed intentions of actors to guide their own responses to punish or reward the actor. This concept is extended to cover instances in which behavioral evidence is lacking. Under these circumstances, it has been shown that the individual will again draw on assumed intentions in order to predict the actions of the third party.

Although the two components are often used interchangeably in common parlance, there is an important distinction between the goals and intentions. This discrepancy lies in the fact that individuals with an intention to perform an action also foster the belief that it will be achieved, whereas the same person with a goal may not necessarily believe that the action is able to be performed in spite of having a strong desire to do so.

Predicting goals and actions, much like the Belief-Desire Model, involves moderating variables that determine whether an action will be performed. In the Goal-Intentional Action Model, the predictors of goals and actions are: the actors' beliefs about their abilities and their actual possession of preconditions required to carry out the action. Additionally, preconditions consist of the various conditions necessary in order for realization of intentions. This includes abilities and skills in addition to environmental variables that may come into play. Schank & Abelson raises the example of going to a restaurant, where the preconditions include the ability to afford the bill and get to the correct venue, in addition to the fact that the restaurant must be open for business. Traditionally, people prefer to allude to preconditions to explain actions that have a high probability of being unattainable, whereas goals tend to be described as a wide range of common actions.

=== Model of everyday inferences ===
Models of everyday inferences capture folk psychology of human informal reasoning. Many models of this nature have been developed. They express and refine our folk psychological ways of understanding of how one makes inferences.

For example, one model describes human everyday reasoning as combinations of simple, direct rules and similarity-based processes. From the interaction of these simple mechanisms, seemingly complex patterns of reasoning emerge. The model has been used to account for a variety of reasoning data.

== Controversy ==
Folk psychology remains the subject of much contention in academic circles with respect to its scope, method and the significance of its contributions to the scientific community. A large part of this criticism stems from the prevailing impression that folk psychology is a primitive practice reserved for the uneducated and non-academics in discussing their everyday lives.

There is significant debate over whether folk psychology is useful for academic purposes; specifically, whether it can be relevant with regard to the scientific psychology domain. It has been argued that a mechanism used for laypeople's understanding, predicting, and explaining each other's actions is inapplicable with regards to the requirements of the scientific method. Conversely, opponents have called for patience, seeing the mechanism employed by laypeople for understanding each other's actions as important in their formation of bases for future action when encountering similar situations. Malle & Knobe hailed this systematization of people's everyday understanding of the mind as an inevitable progression towards a more comprehensive field of psychology. Medin et al. provide another advantage of conceptualizing folk psychology with their Mixture Model of Categorization: it is advantageous as it helps predict action.

== See also ==
- Common sense
- Folk biology
- Intentional stance
- Naïve physics
- Popular psychology
- Theory of mind
