= Classification =

Putting things into categories

Classification is the activity of assigning objects to some pre-existing classes or categories. This is distinct from the task of establishing the classes themselves (for example through cluster analysis).

As well as 'category', synonyms or near-synonyms for 'class' include 'type', 'species', 'forms', 'order', 'concept', 'taxon', 'group', 'identification' and 'division'.

The meaning of the word 'classification' (and its synonyms) may take on one of several related meanings. It may encompass both classification and the creation of classes, as for example in 'the task of categorizing pages in Wikipedia'; this overall activity is listed under taxonomy. It may refer exclusively to the underlying scheme of classes (which otherwise may be called a taxonomy). Or it may refer to the label given to an object by the classifier.

Classification is a part of many different kinds of activities and is studied from many different points of view including medicine, philosophy, law, anthropology, biology, taxonomy, cognition, communications, knowledge organization, psychology, statistics, machine learning and mathematics. In the economic study of human decision making, it is called discrete choice.

== Binary vs multi-class classification ==
Methodological work aimed at improving the accuracy of a classifier is commonly divided between cases where there are exactly two classes (binary classification) and cases where there are three or more classes (multiclass classification).

== Evaluation of accuracy ==
Unlike in decision theory, it is assumed that a classifier repeats the classification task over and over. And unlike a lottery, it is assumed that each classification can be either right or wrong; in the theory of measurement, classification is understood as measurement against a nominal scale. Thus it is possible to try to measure the accuracy of a classifier.

Measuring the accuracy of a classifier allows a choice to be made between two alternative classifiers. This is important both when developing a classifier and in choosing which classifier to deploy. There are however many different methods for evaluating the accuracy of a classifier and no general method for determining which method should be used in which circumstances. Different fields have taken different approaches, even in binary classification (see Evaluation of binary classifiers). In pattern recognition, error rate is popular. The Gini coefficient and KS statistic are widely used in the credit scoring industry. Sensitivity and specificity are widely used in epidemiology and medicine. Precision and recall are widely used in information retrieval.

Classifier accuracy depends greatly on the characteristics of the data to be classified. There is no single classifier that works best on all given problems (a phenomenon that may be explained by the no-free-lunch theorem).

== See also ==
- Class (disambiguation)
- Classified (disambiguation)
- Classifier (disambiguation)
- Cognitive categorization
- Data classification (disambiguation)
- Classification theorem
- Folk taxonomy
- Fuzzy classification
