= Adrenal artery =

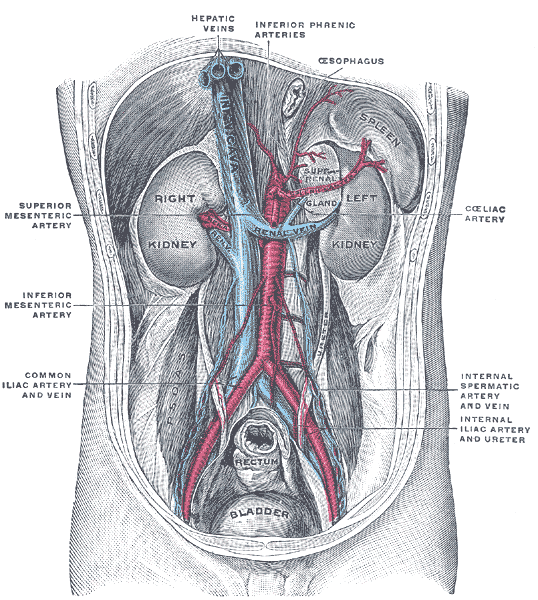
- Posterior abdominal wall, after removal of the peritoneum, showing kidneys, suprarenal capsules, and great vessels

Details
- Source: Superior: Inferior phrenic artery Middle: Abdominal aorta Inferior: Renal artery
- Vein: Suprarenal veins
- Supplies: Adrenal glands

Identifiers
- Latin: arteria suprarenalis (singular)

The adrenal arteries are arteries in the human abdomen that supply blood to the adrenal glands.

The adrenal glands receive input from three different arteries on both the left and right sides of the body:

- superior suprarenal artery branching from the inferior phrenic artery
- middle suprarenal artery branching from the abdominal aorta
- inferior suprarenal artery branching from the renal artery
