= Adrenal medulla =

Central part of the adrenal gland

- Adrenal gland with medulla in the middle

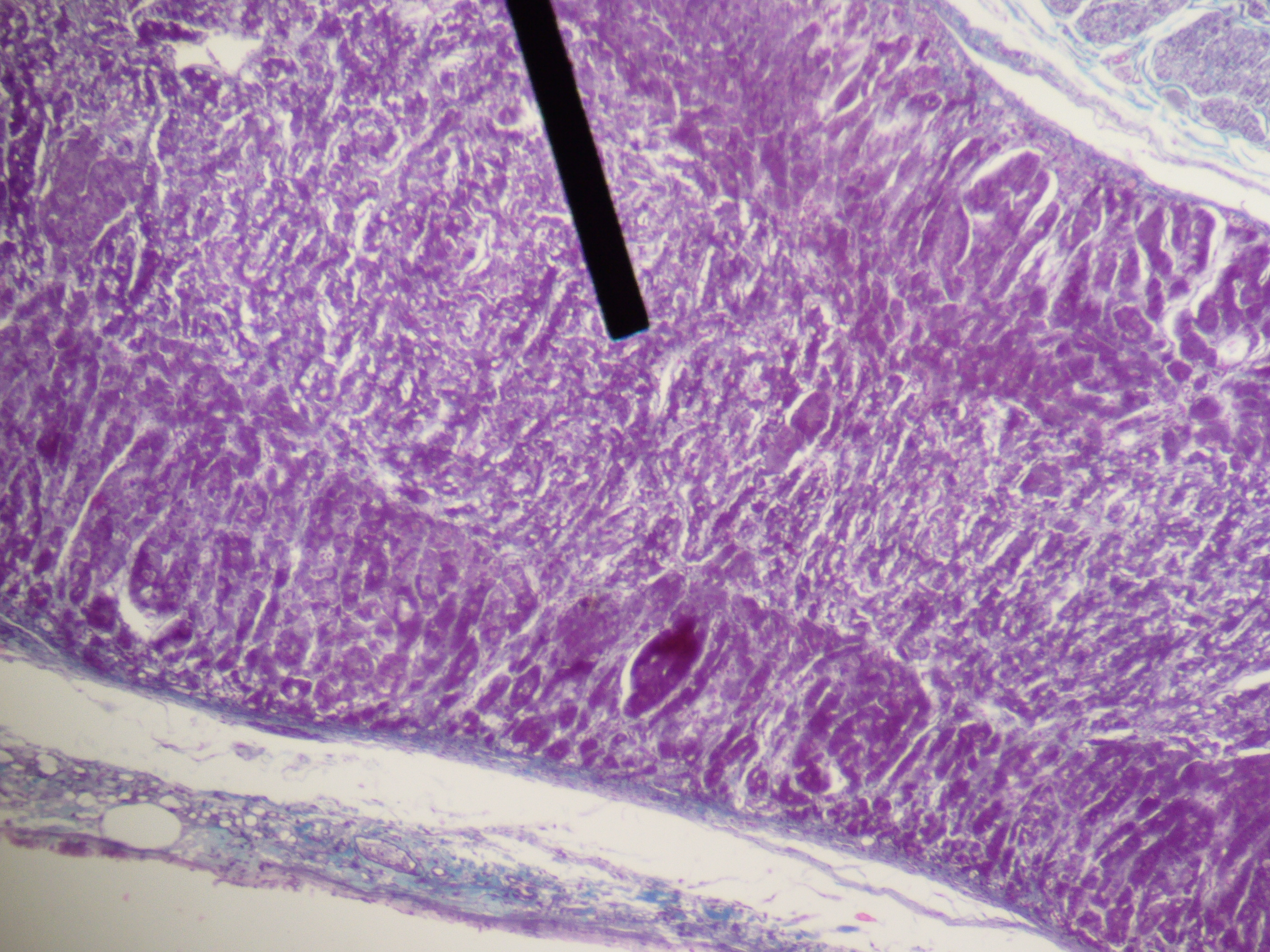
- Adrenal medulla (on the pointer) stains lighter than the adrenal cortex, H&E stain

Details
- Precursor: Neural crest
- Part of: Adrenal gland
- Artery: Superior suprarenal artery, middle suprarenal artery, inferior suprarenal artery
- Vein: Suprarenal veins
- Nerve: Celiac plexus, renal plexus
- Lymph: Lumbar glands

Identifiers
- MeSH: D000313
- TA98: A11.5.00.008
- TA2: 3882
- FMA: 15633

The adrenal medulla (Latin: medulla glandulae suprarenalis) is the inner part of the adrenal gland. It is located at the center of the gland, being surrounded by the adrenal cortex. It is the innermost part of the adrenal gland, consisting of chromaffin cells that secrete catecholamines, including epinephrine (adrenaline), norepinephrine (noradrenaline), and a small amount of dopamine, in response to stimulation by sympathetic preganglionic neurons.

== Structure ==
The adrenal medulla consists of irregularly shaped cells grouped around blood vessels. These cells are intimately connected with the sympathetic division of the autonomic nervous system (ANS). These adrenal medullary cells are modified postganglionic neurons, and preganglionic autonomic nerve fibers lead to them directly from the central nervous system. The adrenal medulla affects energy availability, heart rate, and basal metabolic rate. Recent research indicates that the adrenal medulla may receive input from higher-order cognitive centers in the prefrontal cortex as well as the sensory and motor cortices, providing credence to the idea that there are psychosomatic illnesses.

=== Development ===
Chromaffin cells are derived from the embryonic neural crest, and are modified postganglionic sympathetic neurons. They are modified postganglionic sympathetic neurons of the autonomic nervous system that have lost their axons and dendrites, receiving innervation from corresponding preganglionic fibers. The cells form clusters around fenestrated capillaries where they release norepinephrine and epinephrine into the blood.

As a cluster of neuron cell bodies, the adrenal medulla is considered a modified ganglion of the sympathetic nervous system.

== Function ==
Rather than releasing a neurotransmitter, the cells of the adrenal medulla secrete hormones.

The adrenal medulla is the principal site of the conversion of the amino acid tyrosine into the catecholamines; epinephrine, norepinephrine, and dopamine.

Because the ANS, specifically the sympathetic division, exerts direct control over the chromaffin cells, the hormone release can occur rather quickly. In response to stressors, such as exercise or imminent danger, medullary cells release the catecholamines adrenaline and noradrenaline into the blood. Adrenaline composes about 85% of the released catecholamines, and noradrenaline the other 15%.

Notable effects of adrenaline (epinephrine) and noradrenaline (norepinephrine) include increased heart rate and blood pressure, blood vessel constriction in the skin and gastrointestinal tract, smooth muscle (bronchiole and capillary) dilation, and increased metabolism, all of which are characteristic of the fight-or-flight response. Release of catecholamines is stimulated by nerve impulses, and receptors for catecholamines are widely distributed throughout the body.

== Clinical significance ==
Neoplasms include:

- Pheochromocytoma (most common), a catecholamine-secreting tumor of the adrenal medulla. Pheochromocytomas may generate sudden bursts of paroxysmal symptoms due to excess catecholamine secretion. In a classical presentation of these tumors, some symptoms that commonly occur are palpitations, sweating, and headaches; these last a variable amount of time (minutes to hours) and occur periodically. Other symptoms include but are not limited to pallor, nausea, and panic attacks. Pheochromocytoma is often called a medical "mimic" since it often presents with signs and symptoms that mimic other conditions. For example, pheochromocytoma can result in flushing, nausea, weight loss, fatigue, abdominal pain, constipation, chest pain, and onset of diabetes.
- Neuroblastoma, a neuroendocrine tumor of any neural crest tissue of the sympathetic nervous system.
- Ganglioneuroma, a tumor in the nerve cells of the peripheral nervous system.

The adrenal medulla may be poorly formed or absent in cases of absent adrenal gland. The deficiency in circulating catecholamines is mildly symptomatic due to compensation by the autonomous nervous system, except in episodes of hypoglycemia where glycogenolysis cannot be stimulated by circulating epinephrine .

In dopamine beta hydroxylase deficiency, the entire body cannot efficiently produce epinephrine and norepinephrine from dopamine, this results in severe dysautonomia but most crucially due to autonomous nervous system failure which requires epinephrine and norepinephrine as neurotransmitters, dopamine being used in this pathology as an inadequate substitute.

== See also ==
- Adrenal gland
- Chromaffin cell
- History of catecholamine research
