= Suprarenal artery =

Suprarenal artery may refer to:

- Inferior suprarenal artery (arteria suprarenalis inferior)
- Middle suprarenal arteries (arteria suprarenalis media)
- Superior suprarenal artery (arteria suprarenalis superior)
