= Suprarenal =

Suprarenal is an adjective that may refer to:

- Adrenal gland
- Suprarenal veins
- Suprarenal impression
