= Inferior phrenic =

Inferior phrenic may refer to:

- Inferior phrenic veins
- Inferior phrenic arteries
