= Adrenarche =

Stage of higher primate sexual development

Adrenarche is an early stage in sexual maturation that happens in some higher primates (including humans), typically peaks at around 20 years of age, and is involved in the development of pubic hair, body odor, skin oiliness, axillary hair, sexual attraction/sexual desire/increased libido and mild acne. During adrenarche the adrenal glands secrete increased levels of weak adrenal androgens, including dehydroepiandrosterone (DHEA), dehydroepiandrosterone sulfate (DHEA-S), and androstenedione (A4), but without increased cortisol levels. Adrenarche is the result of the development of a new zone of the adrenal cortex, the zona reticularis. Adrenarche is a process related to puberty, but distinct from hypothalamic–pituitary–gonadal axis (HPG axis) maturation and function.

== Occurrence ==
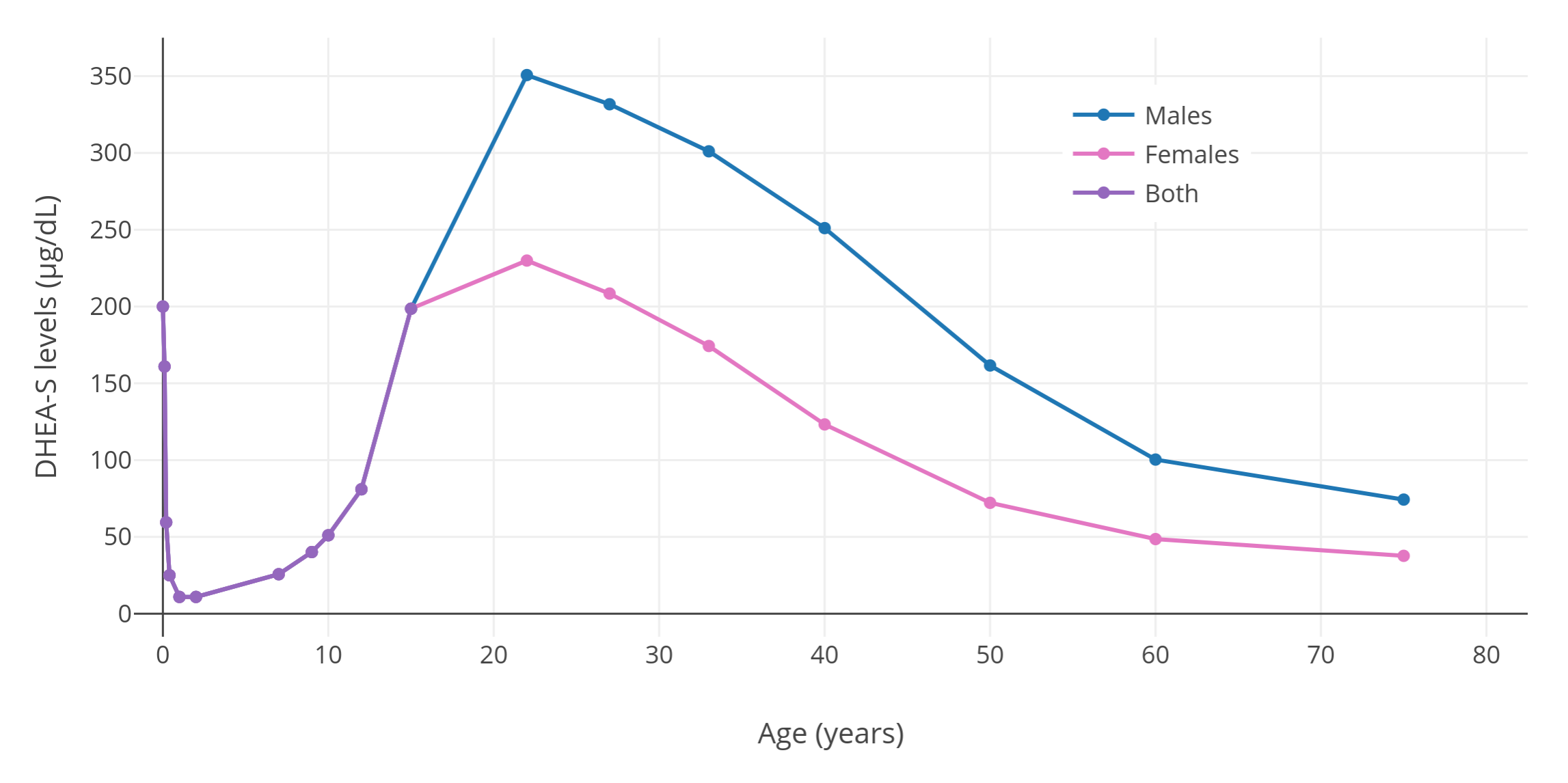
Levels of DHEA-S, a major adrenal androgen, throughout life in humans

Adrenarche occurs starting at the age of 6 years. After the first year of life, the adrenal glands secrete very low levels of adrenal androgens. Adrenarche begins on average between age 5 to 8 in girls and between 7 and 11 in boys, and precedes puberty by about 2 years. Unlike the physical changes that occur during puberty, adrenarche is primarily an emotional and psychological stage of development. It continues throughout puberty, with adrenal androgen levels progressively increasing until reaching maximal levels in young adulthood, around the age of 20 years. Circulating DHEA-S levels specifically peak in humans at about age 19 or 20 years in females and around age 20 to 24 years in males. Levels of corticosteroids like cortisol do not change with adrenarche. Biological messengers, like testosterone and estrogen, during the onset of adrenarche are thought to signal in preparation for puberty.

== Role in puberty ==
An initiator of adrenarche has not yet been identified. Researchers have unsuccessfully tried to identify a new pituitary peptide, to be called "adrenal androgen stimulating hormone". Others have proposed that adrenarchal maturation is a gradual process intrinsic to the adrenal glands that has no distinct trigger. A third avenue of research is pursuing a possible relationship with either fetal or childhood body mass and related signals such as insulin and leptin. Many children born small for gestational age (SGA) because of intrauterine growth restriction (IUGR) have an earlier onset of adrenarche, which raises the possibility that timing of adrenarche may be affected by physiological programming in infancy. Adrenarche also occurs prematurely in many children who are overweight, suggesting a possible relationship with body mass or adiposity signals.

The principal physical consequences of adrenarche are androgen effects, especially pubic hair (in which Tanner stage 2 becomes Tanner stage 3) and the change of sweat composition that produces adult body odor. Increased oiliness of the skin and hair and mild acne may occur. Pubic hair caused by adrenarche is usually transient and will disappear right before the onset of puberty. In most boys, these changes are indistinguishable from early testicular testosterone effects occurring at the beginning of gonadal puberty. In girls, the adrenal androgens of adrenarche produce most of the early androgenic changes of puberty: pubic hair, body odor, skin oiliness, and acne. In most girls the early androgen effects coincide with, or are a few months following, the earliest estrogenic effects of gonadal puberty (breast development and growth acceleration). As female puberty progresses, the ovaries and peripheral tissues become more important sources of androgens.

Parents and many physicians often infer (incorrectly) the onset of puberty from the first appearance of pubic hair (termed pubarche). However, the independence of adrenarche and gonadal puberty is apparent in children with atypical or abnormal development, when one process may occur without the other. For instance, adrenarche does not occur in many girls with Addison's disease, who will continue to have minimal pubic hair as puberty progresses. Conversely, girls with Turner syndrome will have normal adrenarche and normal pubic hair development, but true gonadal puberty never occurs because their ovaries are abnormal.

== Premature adrenarche ==
Premature adrenarche is the most common cause of the early appearance of pubic hair ("premature pubarche") in childhood. In a large proportion of children it seems to be a variation of normal development requiring no treatment. However, there are three clinical issues related to premature adrenarche.

First, when pubic hair appears at an unusually early age in a child, premature adrenarche should be distinguished from true central precocious puberty, from congenital adrenal hyperplasia, and from androgen-producing tumors of the adrenals or gonads. Pediatric endocrinologists do this by demonstrating pubertal levels of DHEA-S and other adrenal androgens, with prepubertal levels of gonadotropins and gonadal sex steroids.

Second, there is some evidence that premature adrenarche may indicate that there was an abnormality of the intrauterine energy environment and of intrauterine growth. As mentioned above, premature adrenarche occurs more often in children with intrauterine growth retardation and in overweight children. Some of these same studies have demonstrated that some girls who display premature adrenarche may continue to have excessive androgen levels in adolescence. This can result in hirsutism or menstrual irregularities due to anovulation, referred to as polyendocrine metabolic ovarian syndrome.

Third, at least one report from 2008 found an increased incidence of behavior and school problems in a group of children with premature adrenarche compared with an otherwise similar control group. To date, such a relationship has neither been confirmed nor explained and there are no obvious management implications.

== Other primates ==
Adrenarche occurs in only a small number of primates, and only chimpanzees and gorillas show a pattern of adrenarche development similar to humans.

== See also ==
- Puberty
- Gonadarche
- Thelarche
- Pubarche
- Menarche
- Spermarche
- Adrenopause
- Adrenal androgen-stimulating hormone
- Precocious puberty
