= Adrenal androgen-stimulating hormone =

Hypothetical hormone

Adrenal androgen stimulating hormone (AASH), also known as cortical androgen stimulating hormone (CASH), is a hypothetical hormone which has been proposed to stimulate the adrenal glands to produce adrenal androgens such as dehydroepiandrosterone (DHEA), dehydroepiandrosterone sulfate (DHEA-S), and androstenedione (A4). It is hypothesized to be involved in adrenarche and adrenopause. The existence of this hormone is controversial and disputed and it has not been identified to date. A number of other mechanisms and/or hormones may instead play the functional role of the so-called AASH.

== See also ==
- Adrenocorticotrophic hormone (ACTH)
