= Absent adrenal gland =

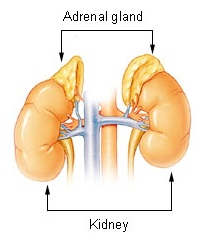
- This condition indicates absence of a adrenal gland
- Specialty: Medical genetics

Absent adrenal gland is a rare condition where the adrenal gland is absent at birth. It should not be confused with adrenal insufficiency or congenital adrenal hyperplasia, where the gland is present but may not be functioning adequately.

Due to the absence of adrenal cortex, the condition causes extreme symptoms of adrenal insufficiency at birth due to very low levels of aldosterone and cortisol. The adrenal medulla can be normally present, poorly formed, or absent, however even so the effects of circulatory catecholamine deficiency are generally mild (due to sympathetic nervous system compensation), except in episodes of hypoglycemia.

== Genetics ==
SF-1 plays a role in the development of adrenal gland. Single gene polymorphism involving SF-1 gene may have a role in adrenal gland agenesis. Various other factors have also been identified.
