= Adrenopause =

Decline in secretion and levels of adrenal androgens

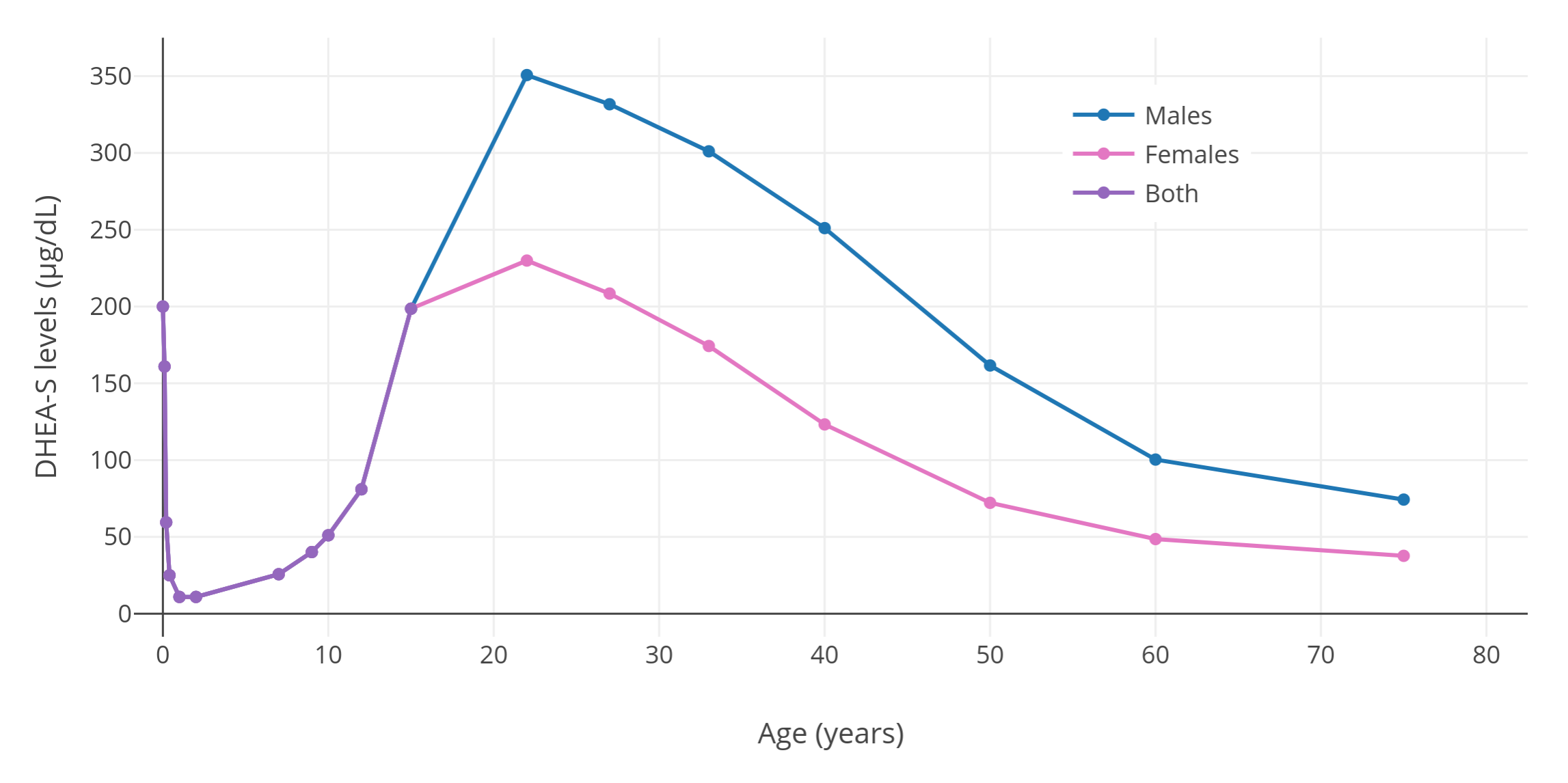
Levels of DHEA-S, a major adrenal androgen, throughout life in humans.

Adrenopause is the decline in secretion and levels of adrenal androgens such as dehydroepiandrosterone (DHEA) and dehydroepiandrosterone sulfate (DHEA-S) from the zona reticularis of the adrenal glands with age. Levels of adrenal androgens start to increase around age 7 or 8 years (adrenarche), peak in early adulthood around age 20 to 25 years, and decrease at a rate of approximately 2% per year thereafter, eventually reaching levels of 10 to 20% of those of young adults by age 80 years. It is caused by the progressive apoptosis of adrenal androgen-secreting cells and hence involution of the zona reticularis. It is analogous to andropause in men and menopause in women, the abrupt or gradual decline in production of sex hormones from the gonads with age.

DHEA can be supplemented or taken as a medication in the form of prasterone to replace adrenal androgens later in life if it is desired. Some clinical studies have found benefits of DHEA supplementation in the elderly and people with adrenal insufficiency.

== See also ==
- Adrenal androgen-stimulating hormone
