= Gonadarche =

Earliest gonadal changes of puberty

Gonadarche (/ˌɡoʊnəˈdɑːrki/) refers to the earliest gonadal (reproductive gland) changes of puberty. In response to pituitary gonadotropins, the ovaries in females and the testes in males begin to grow and increase the production of the sex steroids, especially estradiol and testosterone. The ovary and testis have receptors, follicle cells and leydig cells, respectively, where gonadotropins bind to stimulate the maturation of the gonads and secretion of estrogen and testosterone. Certain disorders can result in changes to timing or nature of these processes.

- In males, gonadarche is responsible for testicular enlargement and virilization.
- In females, gonadarche is responsible for thelarche and menarche (first menstruation).

Gonadarche should be contrasted with adrenarche. Gonadarche indicates that true central puberty has begun, while adrenarche is an independent maturational process only loosely associated with complete puberty.

== Physiology ==
The hypothalamic-pituitary-gonadal axis, key to progression of gonadarche

Puberty is influenced by a multitude of factors including genetic, prenatal, nutritional, and environmental status. Parental pubescent age also influences what age a person starts puberty. Puberty usually begins around ages 10½ in females and around ages 11½–12 in males. Body weight and nutrition status is evidenced to have an effect on puberty onset as well, due to some input from adipose tissue hormonal signaling. Puberty involves both the processes of gonadarche and adrenarche. Adrenarche is responsible for the maturation of the adrenal gland during puberty and stimulates the development of body odor, axillary hair, and acne.

Gonadarche starts off by the macroneurons of the hypothalamus which produce hormone called the gonadotropin-releasing hormone (GnRH) which is responsible for the release of the hormones follicle-stimulating hormone (FSH) and luteinizing hormone (LH), which are produced by the anterior pituitary.

Gonadarche marks the beginning of puberty and it is the process in which gonads, or the primary reproductive organs, mature, following stimulation of gonadotropin hormone-releasing hormone (GnRH) release in the hypothalamus. The release of GnRH triggers a release of hormones that activate the maturation of the ovary and testis. This release is mediated primarily through action of the hypothalamic-pituitary-gonadal axis, a hormonal signaling system active in gestation and fetal development, reactivated around the time of gonadarche to mediate GnRH pulsing release. This, as mentioned above, stimulates FSH and LH release. This activation is also influenced by release of the protein kisspeptin at the time of gonadarche onset. The production of kisspeptin mediates the GnRH pulse release in puberty, but also GnRH activity during fetal development. Prior to onset of gonadarche, stimulation of these hormones from the hypothalamus is suppressed through GABAergic-releasing inhibitory neurons in the central nervous system. Some input of suppression is also linked to secretions of estrogen from immature ovaries in females.

== Sex differences ==
Onset of gonadarche varies between sexes. Average age of onset averages to around eleven and a half years old in males and averages to around nine years old in females.

In females, the first clinical indication of the beginning of adult breast development is thelarche. One in each five females may show signs of pubarche before thelarche. The clinical development across normal puberty is better classified by the Tanner Stages of sexual development for breast and pubic hair. In females, the pubertal growth spurt arise early in puberty due to the direct stimulation of sex steroids and indirectly by the growth hormone-insulin-like growth factor (GH-IGF) axis. Ovulation and follicular functions are stimulated by the gonadotropins released by the hypothalamic-pituitary-gonadal axis' action. Ovarian production of progesterone and estradiol come to adult levels through this process.

Spermatogenesis

In males, gonadarche is determined with testicular volume greater than 3 mL, genital stage greater than or equal to 2, or pubarche, which is defined as pubic hair stage greater than or equal to 2. If testicular volumes of the two testes are not equal, the larger testis measurement is used. Similarly in females, if a female has a larger breast stage on one side, this stage is used. Gonadotropins release mediates maturation of seminiferous tubules to be ready to perform spermatogenesis primarily through stimulation of Sertoli cells, while Leydig cells are similarly stimulted to produce adult levels of testosterone.

Hormonal markers of progression of maturation differ between sexes as well. Tracking of AMH and inhibin B levels can be useful in males, as well as gonadotropin and androgen levels earlier on in puberty. Females also have stable AMH levels, with gonadotropin levels being useful markers longer from between 8 and 4 times as long compared to as in males.

== Disorders ==
=== Central Precocious Puberty (CPP) / Progressive Precocious Gonadarche ===
The disorder Central Precocious Puberty (CPP) is also known as Progressive Precocious Gonadarche or GnRH-dependent precocious puberty, and it occurs when a child's body initiates puberty earlier than what is normally observed. Individuals with CPP will often experience an early growth spurt because their bones are maturing faster than usual. However, since their growth plates will often close earlier and without proper treatment, children with CPP may not reach their predicted adult height.

CPP is caused by premature activation or incompletely suppressed hypothalamic GnRH(gonadotropin-releasing hormone) pulse generator. The GnRH pulse generator is a control center in the body that regulates the release of two important hormones, LH (Luteinizing hormone) and FSH (follicle stimulating hormone), hormones crucial in fertility.

Children with this condition undergo the typical stages of puberty, including the early development of reproductive organs, at younger ages than usual. This is a rare condition with an estimated incidence of about 0.02 to 1.07 cases per million each year based on data collected from 2008 to 2010 in Spain.

CPP is seen more often in young females than males, possibly due to females having less suppression of this pulse generator before puberty. Around 90% of cases are considered to have no identifiable cause in females, while in males, 50% to 70% of cases can be linked to an identifiable cause. Some cases of CPP are associated with specific gene mutations related to GnRH and gonadotropin secretion.

Preferred treatment for CPP is a GnRH receptor agonist. These medications are modified variations of natural GnRH. They are degraded at a slower rate than native GnRH and have a stronger effect on GnRH receptors. This results in continuous GnRH stimulation in the pitutitary, which slows down the production of more GnRH, decreasing gonadotropin secretion. These GnRH receptor agonists are available in the US as daily injections or less frequent depot forms, given every 28 days.

When treating children with CPP, the main goal is to preserve adult height. When trying to preserve adult height it is important to keep a few precautions in mind. During treatment, there is a significant amount of variation in height gained, as it is closely related to the age at which treatment is started. This variation is especially seen in females. Additionally, height outcomes are usually calculated based on the difference between projected adult height, the height recorded at the beginning of treatment, and at the end of treatment. This approach is controversial, as there are frequent overestimations when heights are projected in children with CPP. As a result, health professionals are rarely able to accurately predict the hight outcome of people with CPP.

Psychological distress in relation to early puberty is a concern for many, and some have considered stopping puberty in children with CPP as a means to addressing this issue. Some reports have illustrated poorer psychological outcomes in children with CPP or early menarche. However, there are other studies that counter act this claim and find no difference in the psychological outcomes in gris with CPP.

=== Constitutional Delay in Growth and Puberty (CDGP) ===
CDGP is a conditions characterized by an extreme variation from the normal timing of puberty. Both gonadarche and adrenarche are delayed in this case, resulting in some children developing later than others. There is a delay in the development of the reproductive organs and adrenal glands seen in children with CDGP. Individuals with CDGP usually will display decreased growth velocity during early years of life, but their growth will ultimately catch up with and follow growth patterns seen in the fifth percentile during childhood. However, growth velocity subsequently decreases during the early years of adolescents, due to a transient decrease in GH (growth hormone) secretion. Often, there is a family history of delayed puberty. Individuals with CDGP, often have slower bone maturation, and predicted height is often lower than what is predicted by their genetic potential (based on the height's of their biological parents).

There are currently no reliable diagnostic tests that can be conducted to distinguish CDGP from Hypogonadism. As a result, diagnoses of CDGP are done by ruling out other possible causes. However, there have been laboratory studies done to differentiate a diagnosis of CDGP from Hypogonadotropic Hypogonadism using inhibin B and anti-Müllerian hormone concentrations.

When treating children with CDGP, the goal is to improve growth as well as maintain average body proportions and peak bone mass, while ensuring that growth potential is not impaired. Emotional outcomes for children are also studied, as distress has been documented in some children due to their lack of growth. This distress has been shown to affect their school performance and social relationships.

=== Obesity and early puberty ===
Childhood obesity has increased over the past several years particularly around 1975–2016. The research supporting the link between obesity and delayed puberty in both females and males is still not concrete. Some studies have supported that obesity may have an effect of earlier puberty in females but the data is not consistent with its relation to delayed puberty in males.

Assessment of the start of puberty can be harder to identify between males and females. Thelarche or breast bud development is usually the first sign of puberty in females. In children with obesity, it may be harder to identify excess adipose tissue with breast bud development, leading to potential false early puberty diagnosis.

Some data suggests that obesity can lead to a later pubertal onset in males. However, markers of early gonadal development is harder to identify in males because the true marker of the onset of puberty is testicular enlargement of 3 ml of larger which requires more invasive observations.

In conclusion, starting treatment as early as right after diagnosis is related to significant success in maintaining final adult height in case of CPP. The outcomes are determined by different factors; such as advancement of bone change in case of CDGP, age at which a child's body begins changing in case of CPP, the timing of initiation, and duration of treatment. The hypothalamic–pituitary–gonadal (HPG) axis which is essentially in charge of regulating reproductive activity and releasing estrogen and progesterone in humans returns to normal levels by the end of the treatment and the children generally have normal development of puberty after finishing the treatment same as the normal levels of typical children. There is not much data on the long-term endocrine, metabolic, reproductive, and psychological outcomes.

== See also ==
- Puberty
- Adrenarche
- Thelarche
- Pubarche
- Menarche
- Spermarche
