= Adrenal steroid =

Class of chemical compounds

Adrenal steroids are steroids that are derived from the adrenal glands. They include corticosteroids, which consist of glucocorticoids like cortisol and mineralocorticoids like aldosterone, adrenal androgens like dehydroepiandrosterone (DHEA), DHEA sulfate (DHEA-S), and androstenedione (A4), and neurosteroids like DHEA and DHEA-S, as well as pregnenolone and pregnenolone sulfate (P5-S). Adrenal steroids are specifically produced in the adrenal cortex.

Adrenal steroids are distinguished from gonadal steroids, which are steroids that are derived from the gonads and include sex steroids such as progestogens like progesterone, potent androgens like testosterone, and estrogens like estradiol.

== Function ==
The main role of adrenal steroids is to regulate electrolyte and water levels in the kidneys. Each steroid has a different effect on these levels. These effects also depend on the functionality of the adrenal glands.

In people with adrenal insufficiency, desoxycorticosterone acts to decrease the sodium concentration in urine while at the same time increasing the potassium concentration. By doing this, sodium is reabsorbed and sodium levels increase in the serum while potassium levels decrease. Cortisone is another steroid that allows the glomeruli to filter the blood more efficiently. This steroid also increases the urine volume as a result of its ability to decrease the retention of water within the kidney. In people with healthy or hyperfunctioning adrenal glands, desoxycorticosterone plays a completely different role. This steroid now increases the sodium concentration within the urine, resulting in the loss of electrolytes. On the other hand, the role of cortisone stays relatively constant.

== Uses of adrenal steroids ==
Adrenal steroids such as glucocorticoids and mineralocorticoids are commonly used as treatments in diseases such as Congenital adrenal hyperplasia. CAH commonly causes overproduction of androgens, glucocorticoid treatment is used to reduce Adrenocorticotropic hormone (ACTH) and reduce the production of androgens allowing for symptoms of CAH to be managed though treatment is required to be continued regularly for life or symptoms may return.

Glucocorticoids are known to cause suppression of osteoblastic activity causing reduction in bone formation during development and cause an increased amount of bone resorption causing the breaking down of bone tissue. This commonly leads to diseases such as osteopenia and osteoporosis in developing humans due to reduced bone mineral density and bone volume density. However studies have shown that glucocorticoid treatment of patients that have CAH does not have major detrimental effects to bone mineral density even showing that BMD was higher in CAH patients that have undergone glucocorticoid treatment. Not much is known however about the precise mechanisms that cause glucocorticoid bone reduction.

Adrenal androgens are another form of adrenal steroids that include dehydroepiandrosterone, androstenedione, and androstenediol. These androgens have little androgenic activity when compared to other steroids of the same name however they are most commonly converted to other androgens such as testosterone and estrogen, however the most common conversion is into estrogen making adrenal androgens very important in a developing human female.

== Intracrinology ==
Adrenal androgens like DHEA and DHEA-S are transformed locally into potent androgens like testosterone and/or dihydrotestosterone (DHT) in various tissues such as the skin, hair follicles, prostate gland, breasts, vagina, and others. Such tissues have all of the enzymes, including 3β-hydroxysteroid dehydrogenase (3β-HSD), 17β-hydroxysteroid dehydrogenase (17β-HSD), 5α-reductase, and steroid sulfatase (STS), necessary to transform adrenal androgens like DHEA and DHEA-S into testosterone and/or DHT. Androstenedione and testosterone originating from the adrenal glands can also be aromatized into the estrogens estrone and estradiol, respectively, in various tissues. Transformation of adrenal androgens into potent androgens and estrogens is involved in sebum production, skin oiliness, acne, pubic and body hair growth, hirsutism, prostate cancer, breast cancer, and other functions and conditions.

== Complications ==
A deficiency or excess amount of adrenal steroid can be a sign for various health problems and treatments can lead to significant complications.

21-hydroxylase deficiency is a type of congenital adrenal hyperplasia in which there is an overproduction of adrenal steroid, specifically adrenal androgens. This excess can cause salt to be released unnecessarily, resulting in salt deficiency. This can be treated with mineralocorticoids and glucocorticoids which help to reduce the overproduction of adrenal androgens. However, the problem is that these glucocorticoids reduce the creation of bone and induce the resorption of bone. They signal the osteoblasts and osteocytes to undergo apoptosis, or regulated cell death.

The presence of adrenal steroids also acts as an indicator for potential diseases. A study was conducted observing the relationship between the level of adrenal steroid hormones with obesity among young boys aged between six and fourteen years. The study concluded that elevated levels of two adrenal androgens (DHEA and androstenedione) were found in obese boys compared to boys of a normal weight during the prepubescent stage of life. In addition, future study should be conducted concerning the low levels of androgens found in overweight boys during the postpubescent stage of life. There is a potential relationship between obesity and the levels of androgens found in the serum.

== Levels ==
Concentrations of adrenal androgens throughout life have been studied. Adrenal androgen levels are higher in men than in women.

== See also ==
- Adrenopause
- Adrenal androgen-stimulating hormone
