= Middle suprarenal arteries =

Arteries of the abdomen

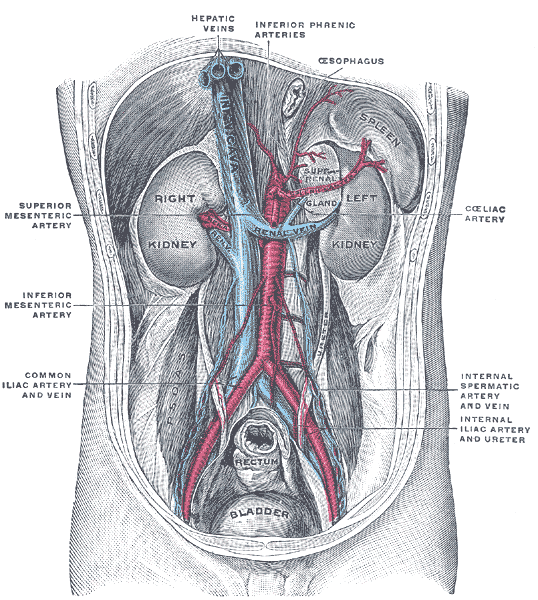
- Posterior abdominal wall, after removal of the peritoneum, showing kidneys, suprarenal capsules, and great vessels (middle suprarenal artery visible but not labeled)

Details
- Source: Abdominal aorta
- Vein: Suprarenal veins
- Supplies: Adrenal gland

Identifiers
- Latin: arteria suprarenalis media
- TA98: A12.2.12.074
- TA2: 4268
- FMA: 14754

The middle suprarenal artery (middle capsular artery) is a paired artery in the abdomen. It is a branch of the aorta. It supplies the adrenal gland.

== Structure ==
=== Origin ===
The middle suprarenal artery (usually) arises from lateral aspect of the abdominal aorta. Its origin occurs at roughly the same level as that of the superior mesenteric artery.

=== Course ===
The vessel passes laterally and slightly superior-ward, passing over the crura of the diaphragm to reach the surface of the ipsilateral suprarenal gland, whereupon it forms anastomoses with the other suprarenal arteries.

=== Relations ===
The anatomical relations of the left and right middle superior artery differ. The right vessel crosses the inferior vena cava posteriorly near the right celiac ganglion. The left vessel passes near the right celiac ganglion, superior margin of the spleen, and splenic artery.

=== Variation ===
There is usually a single middle suprarenal artery (on either side of the body), but in some individuals, there may be multiple, or the vessel may be absent.

The vessel may sometimes arise from the (ipsilateral) renal artery, or (ipsilateral) inferior phrenic artery.

== Function ==
The middle suprarenal artery supplies the adrenal gland.

== Clinical significance ==
The middle suprarenal artery may be assessed using Doppler ultrasound.

== History ==
The middle suprarenal artery may also be known as the middle adrenal artery or the middle capsular artery.

== See also ==
- Superior suprarenal artery
- Inferior suprarenal artery
