= Inferior phrenic vein =

Vein

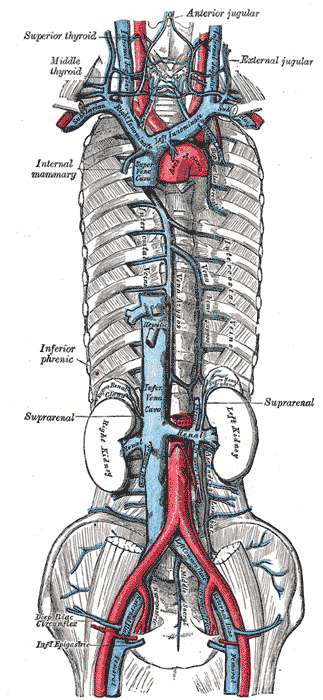
- The venæ cavæ and azygos veins, with their tributaries.

Details
- Drains from: Thoracic diaphragm
- Drains to: Inferior vena cava, others
- Artery: Inferior phrenic arteries

Identifiers
- Latin: venae phrenicae inferiores
- TA98: A12.3.09.002
- TA2: 4992
- FMA: 68068

The inferior phrenic veins drain the diaphragm and follow the course of the inferior phrenic arteries;

- the right ends in the inferior vena cava;
- the left is often represented by two branches,
  - one of which ends in the left renal or suprarenal vein,
  - while the other passes in front of the esophageal hiatus in the diaphragm and opens into the inferior vena cava.
