= Adrenal gland =

Endocrine gland

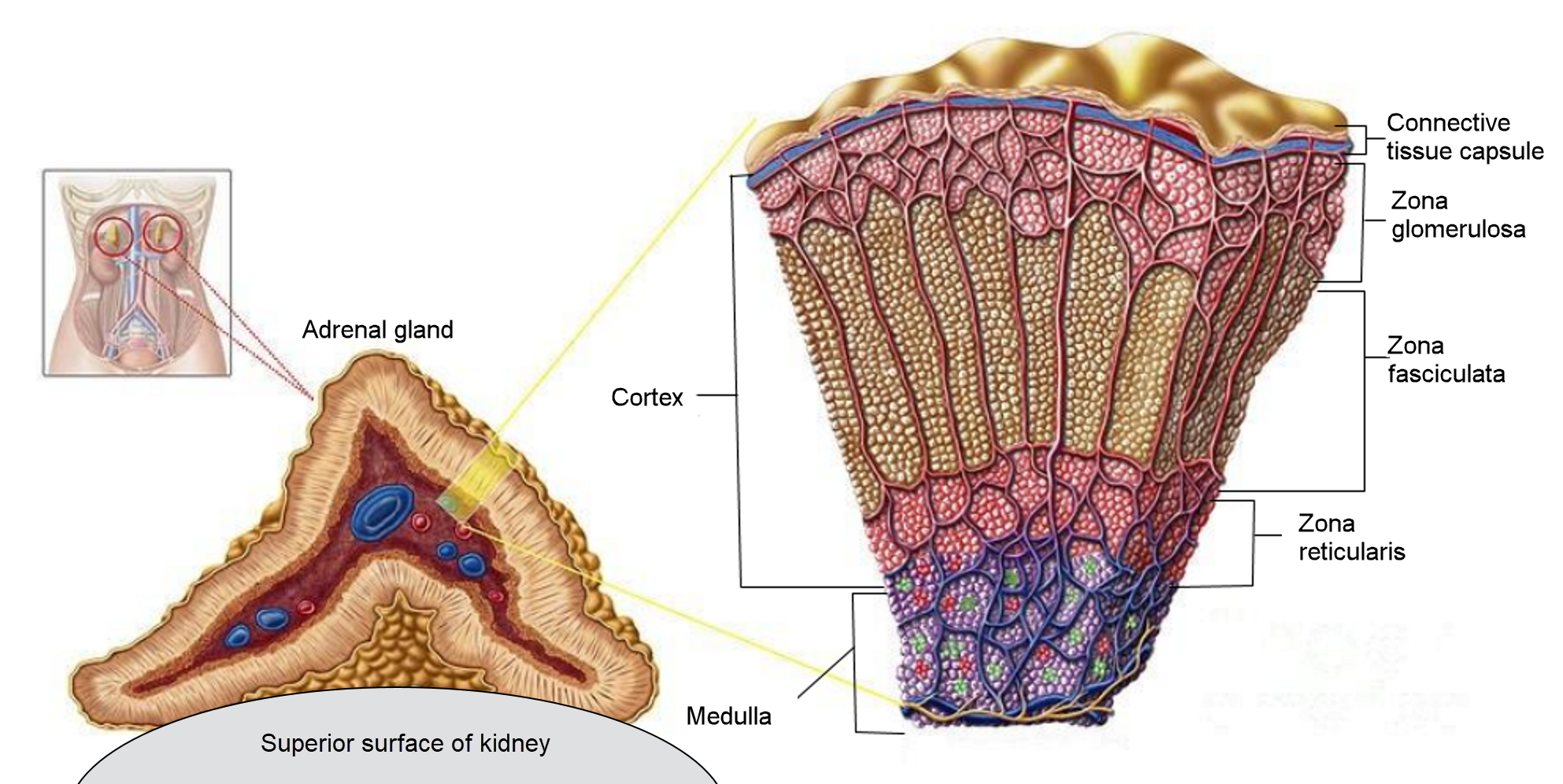
- Detailed diagram of the adrenal gland

- Position of adrenal gland

Details
- Precursor: Mesoderm and neural crest
- System: Endocrine system
- Artery: Superior, middle and inferior suprarenal arteries
- Vein: Suprarenal veins
- Nerve: Celiac and renal plexus
- Lymph: Lumbar lymph nodes

Identifiers
- Latin: glandula suprarenalis
- MeSH: D000311
- TA98: A11.5.00.001
- TA2: 3874
- FMA: 9604

The adrenal glands (also known as suprarenal glands) are endocrine glands that produce a variety of hormones including adrenaline and the steroids aldosterone and cortisol. They are found above the kidneys. Each gland has an outer cortex which produces steroid hormones and an inner medulla. The adrenal cortex itself is divided into three main zones: the zona glomerulosa, the zona fasciculata and the zona reticularis.

The adrenal cortex produces three main types of steroid hormones: mineralocorticoids, glucocorticoids, and androgens. Mineralocorticoids (such as aldosterone) produced in the zona glomerulosa help in the regulation of blood pressure and electrolyte balance. The glucocorticoids cortisol and cortisone are synthesized in the zona fasciculata; their functions include the regulation of metabolism and immune system suppression. The innermost layer of the cortex, the zona reticularis, produces androgens that are converted to fully functional sex hormones in the gonads and other target organs. The production of steroid hormones is called steroidogenesis, and involves a number of reactions and processes that take place in cortical cells. The medulla produces the catecholamines, which function to produce a rapid response throughout the body in stress situations.

A number of endocrine diseases involve dysfunctions of the adrenal gland. Overproduction of cortisol leads to Cushing's syndrome, whereas insufficient production is associated with Addison's disease. Congenital adrenal hyperplasia is a genetic disease produced by dysregulation of endocrine control mechanisms. A variety of tumors can arise from adrenal tissue and are commonly found in medical imaging when searching for other diseases.

== Structure ==
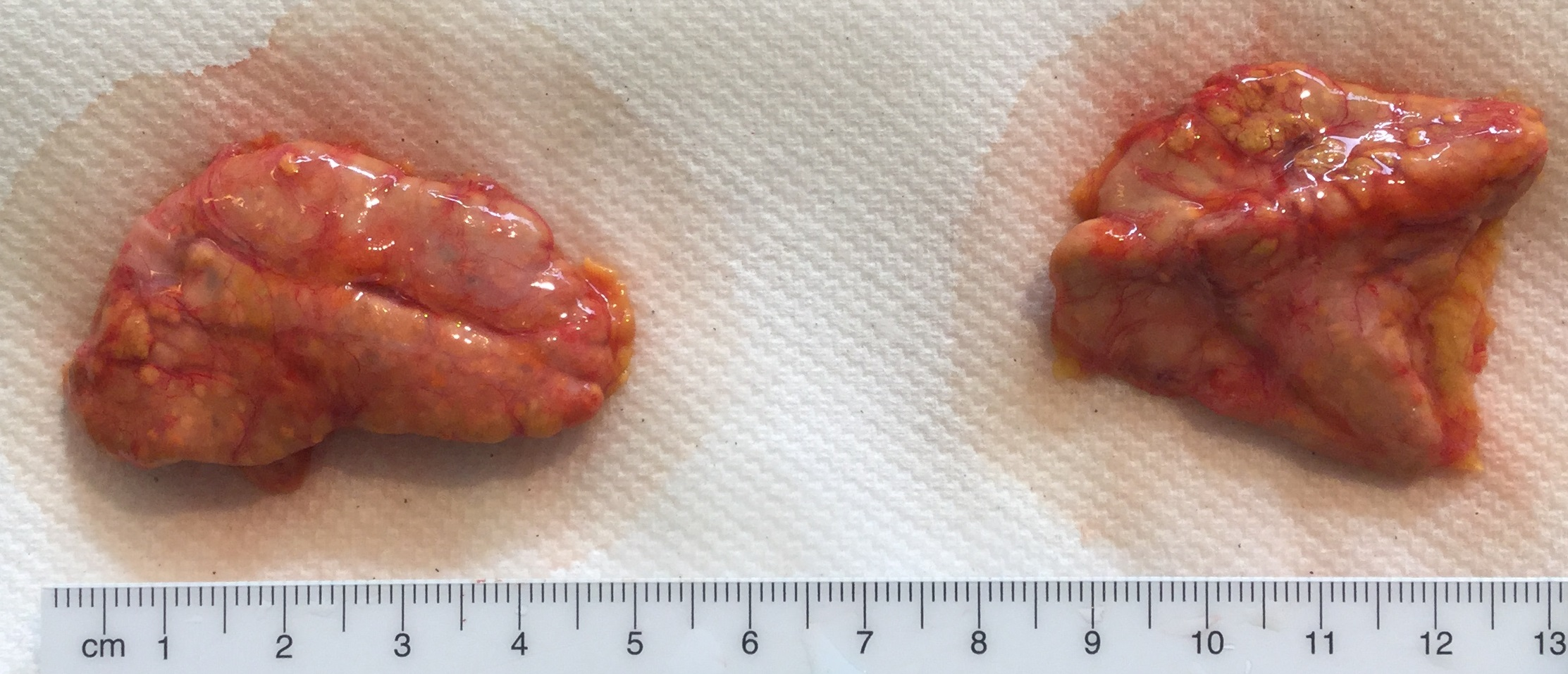
Adrenal glands, anterior (left) and posterior (right) surface

The adrenal glands are located on both sides of the body in the retroperitoneum, above and slightly medial to the kidneys. In humans, the right adrenal gland is pyramidal in shape, whereas the left is semilunar or crescent shaped and somewhat larger. The adrenal glands measure approximately 5 cm in length, 3 cm in width, and up to 1 cm in thickness. Their combined weight in an adult human ranges from 7 to 10 grams. The glands are yellowish in colour.

The adrenal glands are surrounded by a fatty capsule and lie within the renal fascia, which also surrounds the kidneys. A weak septum (wall) of connective tissue separates the glands from the kidneys. The adrenal glands are directly below the diaphragm, and are attached to the crura of the diaphragm by the renal fascia.

Each adrenal gland has two distinct parts, each with a unique function, the outer adrenal cortex and the inner medulla, both of which produce hormones.

=== Adrenal cortex ===
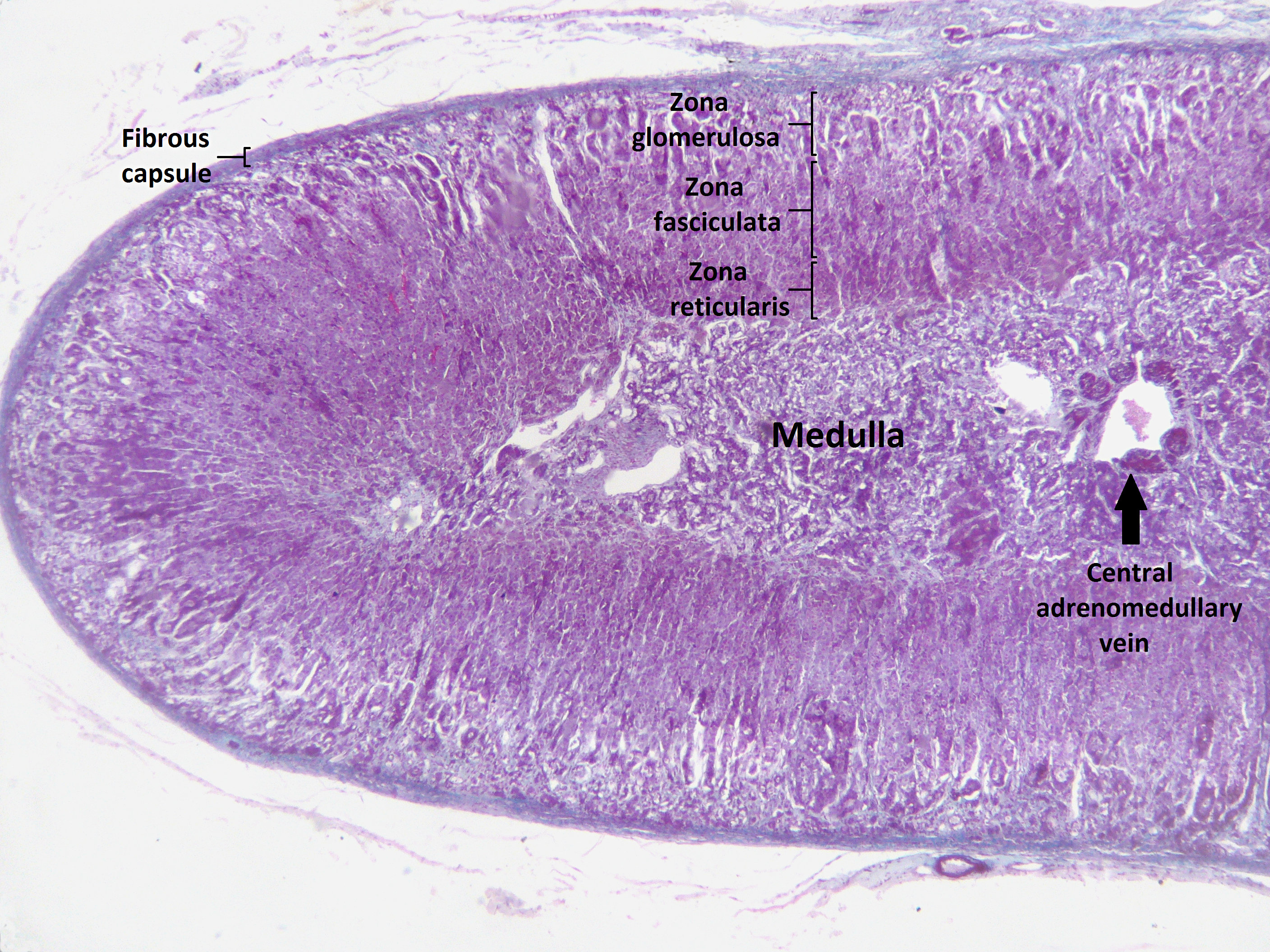
Section of human adrenal gland under the microscope, showing its different layers. From the surface to the center: zona glomerulosa, zona fasciculata, zona reticularis, medulla. In the medulla, the central adrenomedullary vein is visible.

The adrenal cortex is the outer region and also the largest part of an adrenal gland. It has three layers, or zones: zona glomerulosa, zona fasciculata and zona reticularis. Each zone is responsible for producing specific hormones. When viewed under a microscope, each layer has a distinct appearance and each has a different function. The adrenal cortex produces hormones, namely aldosterone, cortisol and androgens.

==== Zona glomerulosa ====
The outermost zone of the adrenal cortex is the zona glomerulosa, which lies immediately beneath the gland's fibrous capsule. Cells in this layer form oval groups that are separated by thin strands of connective tissue from the fibrous capsule and carry wide capillaries.

This layer is the main site for production of aldosterone, a mineralocorticoid, by the action of the enzyme aldosterone synthase. Aldosterone plays an important role in the long-term regulation of blood pressure.

==== Zona fasciculata ====
The zona fasciculata is situated between the zona glomerulosa and the zona reticularis. Cells in this layer are responsible for producing glucocorticoids such as cortisol. It is the largest of the three layers, accounting for nearly 80% of the volume of the cortex. In the zona fasciculata, cells are arranged in columns that are radially oriented towards the medulla. Cells contain numerous lipid droplets, abundant mitochondria and a complex smooth endoplasmic reticulum.

==== Zona reticularis ====
The innermost cortical layer, the zona reticularis, lies directly adjacent to the medulla and produces androgens, mainly dehydroepiandrosterone (DHEA), DHEA sulfate (DHEA-S), and androstenedione (the precursor to testosterone) in humans. Its small cells form irregular cords and clusters that are separated by capillaries and connective tissue. The cells contain small quantities of cytoplasm and lipid droplets, and sometimes display brown lipofuscin pigment.

=== Medulla ===
The adrenal medulla is at the center of each adrenal gland, and is surrounded by the adrenal cortex. The chromaffin cells of the medulla are the body's main source of the catecholamines, such as adrenaline and noradrenaline, released by the medulla. Approximately 20% noradrenaline (norepinephrine) and 80% adrenaline (epinephrine) are secreted here.

The adrenal medulla is driven by the sympathetic nervous system via preganglionic fibers originating in the thoracic spinal cord, from vertebrae T5–T11. Because it is innervated by preganglionic nerve fibers, the adrenal medulla can be considered as a specialized sympathetic ganglion. Unlike other sympathetic ganglia, however, the adrenal medulla lacks distinct synapses and releases its secretions directly into the blood.

=== Blood supply ===
The adrenal glands have one of the greatest blood supply rates per gram of tissue of any organ: up to 60 small arteries may enter each gland. Three arteries usually supply each adrenal gland:

- The superior suprarenal artery, a branch of the inferior phrenic artery
- The middle suprarenal artery, a direct branch of the abdominal aorta
- The inferior suprarenal artery, a branch of the renal artery

These blood vessels supply a network of small arteries within the capsule of the adrenal glands. Thin strands of the capsule enter the glands, carrying blood to them.

Venous blood is drained from the glands by the suprarenal veins, usually one for each gland:

- The right suprarenal vein drains into the inferior vena cava.
- The left suprarenal vein drains into the left renal vein or the left inferior phrenic vein.

The central adrenomedullary vein, in the adrenal medulla, is an unusual type of blood vessel. Its structure is different from the other veins in that the smooth muscle in its tunica media (the middle layer of the vessel) is arranged in conspicuous, longitudinally oriented bundles.

=== Variability ===
The adrenal glands may not develop at all, or may be fused in the midline behind the aorta. These are associated with other congenital abnormalities, such as failure of the kidneys to develop, or fused kidneys. The gland may develop with a partial or complete absence of the cortex, or may develop in an unusual location.

== Function ==
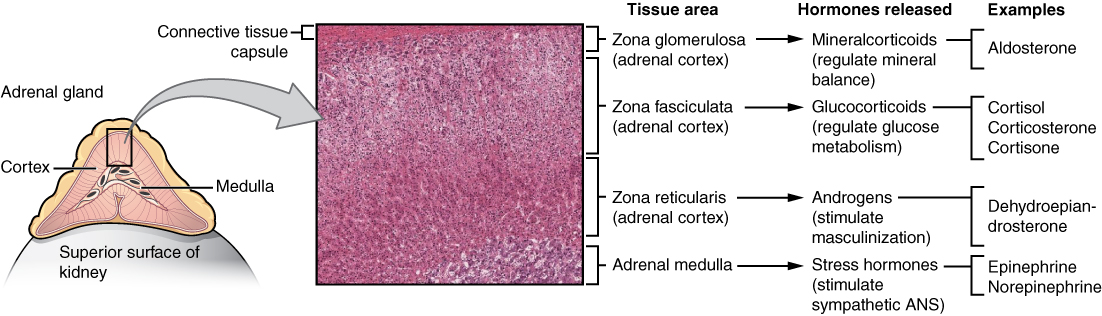
Different hormones are produced in different zones of the cortex and medulla of the gland. Light microscopy at magnification × 204.

The adrenal gland secretes a number of different hormones which are metabolised by enzymes either within the gland or in other parts of the body. These hormones are involved in a number of essential biological functions.

=== Corticosteroids ===
Corticosteroids are a group of steroid hormones produced from the cortex of the adrenal gland, from which they are named.

- Mineralocorticoids such as aldosterone regulate salt ("mineral") balance and blood pressure
- Glucocorticoids such as cortisol influence metabolism rates of proteins, fats and sugars ("glucose").
- Androgens such as dehydroepiandrosterone.

Mineralocorticoids

The adrenal gland produces aldosterone, a mineralocorticoid, which is important in the regulation of salt ("mineral") balance and blood volume. In the kidneys, aldosterone acts on the distal convoluted tubules and the collecting ducts by increasing the reabsorption of sodium and the excretion of both potassium and hydrogen ions. Aldosterone is responsible for the reabsorption of about 2% of filtered glomerular filtrate. Sodium retention is also a response of the distal colon and sweat glands to aldosterone receptor stimulation. Angiotensin II and extracellular potassium are the two main regulators of aldosterone production. The amount of sodium present in the body affects the extracellular volume, which in turn influences blood pressure. Therefore, the effects of aldosterone in sodium retention are important for the regulation of blood pressure.

Glucocorticoids

Cortisol is the main glucocorticoid in humans. In species that do not create cortisol, this role is played by corticosterone instead. Glucocorticoids have many effects on metabolism. As their name suggests, they increase the circulating level of glucose. This is the result of an increase in the mobilization of amino acids from protein and the stimulation of synthesis of glucose from these amino acids in the liver. In addition, they increase the levels of free fatty acids, which cells can use as an alternative to glucose to obtain energy. Glucocorticoids also have effects unrelated to the regulation of blood sugar levels, including the suppression of the immune system and a potent anti-inflammatory effect. Cortisol reduces the capacity of osteoblasts to produce new bone tissue and decreases the absorption of calcium in the gastrointestinal tract.

The adrenal gland secretes a basal level of cortisol but can also produce bursts of the hormone in response to adrenocorticotropic hormone (ACTH) from the anterior pituitary. Cortisol is not evenly released during the day – its concentrations in the blood are highest in the early morning and lowest in the evening as a result of the circadian rhythm of ACTH secretion. Cortisone is an inactive product of the action of the enzyme 11β-HSD on cortisol. The reaction catalyzed by 11β-HSD is reversible, which means that it can turn administered cortisone into cortisol, the biologically active hormone.

Formation

Steroidogenesis in the adrenal glands – different steps occur in different layers of the gland

All corticosteroid hormones share cholesterol as a common precursor. Therefore, the first step in steroidogenesis is cholesterol uptake or synthesis. Cells that produce steroid hormones can acquire cholesterol through two paths. The main source is through dietary cholesterol transported via the blood as cholesterol esters within low density lipoproteins (LDL). LDL enters the cells through receptor-mediated endocytosis. The other source of cholesterol is synthesis in the cell's endoplasmic reticulum. Synthesis can compensate when LDL levels are abnormally low. In the lysosome, cholesterol esters are converted to free cholesterol, which is then used for steroidogenesis or stored in the cell.

The initial part of conversion of cholesterol into steroid hormones involves a number of enzymes of the cytochrome P450 family that are located in the inner membrane of mitochondria. Transport of cholesterol from the outer to the inner membrane is facilitated by steroidogenic acute regulatory protein and is the rate-limiting step of steroid synthesis.

The layers of the adrenal gland differ by function, with each layer having distinct enzymes that produce different hormones from a common precursor. The first enzymatic step in the production of all steroid hormones is cleavage of the cholesterol side chain, a reaction that forms pregnenolone as a product and is catalyzed by the enzyme P450scc, also known as cholesterol desmolase. After the production of pregnenolone, specific enzymes of each cortical layer further modify it. Enzymes involved in this process include both mitochondrial and microsomal P450s and hydroxysteroid dehydrogenases. Usually a number of intermediate steps in which pregnenolone is modified several times are required to form the functional hormones. Enzymes that catalyze reactions in these metabolic pathways are involved in a number of endocrine diseases. For example, the most common form of congenital adrenal hyperplasia develops as a result of deficiency of 21-hydroxylase, an enzyme involved in an intermediate step of cortisol production.

Regulation

Negative feedback in the HPA axis

Glucocorticoids are under the regulatory influence of the hypothalamic–pituitary–adrenal axis (HPA) axis. Glucocorticoid synthesis is stimulated by adrenocorticotropic hormone (ACTH), a hormone released into the bloodstream by the anterior pituitary. In turn, production of ACTH is stimulated by the presence of corticotropin-releasing hormone (CRH), which is released by neurons of the hypothalamus. ACTH acts on the adrenal cells first by increasing the levels of StAR within the cells, and then of all steroidogenic P450 enzymes. The HPA axis is an example of a negative feedback system, in which cortisol itself acts as a direct inhibitor of both CRH and ACTH synthesis. The HPA axis also interacts with the immune system through increased secretion of ACTH at the presence of certain molecules of the inflammatory response.

Mineralocorticoid secretion is regulated mainly by the renin–angiotensin–aldosterone system (RAAS), the concentration of potassium, and to a lesser extent the concentration of ACTH. Sensors of blood pressure in the juxtaglomerular apparatus of the kidneys release the enzyme renin into the blood, which starts a cascade of reactions that lead to formation of angiotensin II. Angiotensin receptors in cells of the zona glomerulosa recognize the substance, and upon binding they stimulate the release of aldosterone.

=== Androgens ===
Cells in zona reticularis of the adrenal glands produce male sex hormones, or androgens, the most important of which is DHEA. In general, these hormones do not have an overall effect in the male body, and are converted to more potent androgens such as testosterone and DHT or to estrogens (female sex hormones) in the gonads, acting in this way as a metabolic intermediate.

=== Catecholamines ===
Also called epinephrine and norepinephrine, adrenaline and noradrenaline, respectively, are catecholamines – water-soluble compounds that have a structure made of a catechol group and an amine group. The adrenal glands are responsible for most of the adrenaline that circulates in the body, but only for a small amount of circulating noradrenaline. These hormones are released by the adrenal medulla, which contains a dense network of blood vessels. Adrenaline and noradrenaline act by binding to adrenoreceptors throughout the body, with effects that include an increase in blood pressure and heart rate. Actions of adrenaline and noradrenaline are responsible for the fight or flight response, characterised by a quickening of breathing and heart rate, an increase in blood pressure, and constriction of blood vessels in many parts of the body.

==== Formation ====
Catecholamines are produced in chromaffin cells in the medulla of the adrenal gland, from tyrosine, a non-essential amino acid derived from food or produced from phenylalanine in the liver. The enzyme tyrosine hydroxylase converts tyrosine to L-DOPA in the first step of catecholamine synthesis. L-DOPA is then converted to dopamine before it can be turned into noradrenaline. In the cytosol, noradrenaline is converted to epinephrine by the enzyme phenylethanolamine N-methyltransferase (PNMT) and stored in granules. Glucocorticoids produced in the adrenal cortex stimulate the synthesis of catecholamines by increasing the levels of tyrosine hydroxylase and PNMT.

Catecholamine release is stimulated by the activation of the sympathetic nervous system. Splanchnic nerves of the sympathetic nervous system innervate the medulla of the adrenal gland. When activated, it evokes the release of catecholamines from the storage granules by stimulating the opening of calcium channels in the cell membrane.

== Gene and protein expression ==
The human genome includes approximately 20,000 protein coding genes and 70% of these genes are expressed in the normal adult adrenal glands. Only some 250 genes are more specifically expressed in the adrenal glands compared to other organs and tissues. The adrenal-gland-specific genes with the highest level of expression include members of the cytochrome P450 superfamily of enzymes. Corresponding proteins are expressed in the different compartments of the adrenal gland, such as CYP11A1, HSD3B2 and FDX1 involved in steroid hormone synthesis and expressed in cortical cell layers, and PNMT and DBH involved in noradrenaline and adrenaline synthesis and expressed in the medulla.

== Development ==
The adrenal glands are composed of two heterogenous types of tissue. In the center is the adrenal medulla, which produces adrenaline and noradrenaline and releases them into the bloodstream, as part of the sympathetic nervous system. Surrounding the medulla is the cortex, which produces a variety of steroid hormones. These tissues come from different embryological precursors and have distinct prenatal development paths. The cortex of the adrenal gland is derived from mesoderm, whereas the medulla is derived from the neural crest, which is of ectodermal origin.

The adrenal glands in a newborn baby are much larger as a proportion of the body size than in an adult. For example, at age three months the glands are four times the size of the kidneys. The size of the glands decreases relatively after birth, mainly because of shrinkage of the cortex. The cortex, which almost completely disappears by age 1, develops again from age 4–5. The glands weigh about 1 gram at birth and develop to an adult weight of about 4 grams each. In a fetus the glands are first detectable after the sixth week of development.

=== Cortex ===
Adrenal cortex tissue is derived from the intermediate mesoderm. It first appears 33 days after fertilisation, shows steroid hormone production capabilities by the eighth week and undergoes rapid growth during the first trimester of pregnancy. The fetal adrenal cortex is different from its adult counterpart, as it is composed of two distinct zones: the inner "fetal" zone, which carries most of the hormone-producing activity, and the outer "definitive" zone, which is in a proliferative phase. The fetal zone produces large amounts of adrenal androgens (male sex hormones) that are used by the placenta for estrogen biosynthesis. Cortical development of the adrenal gland is regulated mostly by ACTH, a hormone produced by the pituitary gland that stimulates cortisol synthesis. During midgestation, the fetal zone occupies most of the cortical volume and produces 100–200 mg/day of DHEA-S, an androgen and precursor of both androgens and estrogens (female sex hormones). Adrenal hormones, especially glucocorticoids such as cortisol, are essential for prenatal development of organs, particularly for the maturation of the lungs. The adrenal gland decreases in size after birth because of the rapid disappearance of the fetal zone, with a corresponding decrease in androgen secretion.

==== Adrenarche ====
During early childhood androgen synthesis and secretion remain low, but several years before puberty (from 6–8 years of age) changes occur in both anatomical and functional aspects of cortical androgen production that lead to increased secretion of the steroids DHEA and DHEA-S. These changes are part of a process called adrenarche, which has only been described in humans and some other primates. Adrenarche is independent of ACTH or gonadotropins and correlates with a progressive thickening of the zona reticularis layer of the cortex. Functionally, adrenarche provides a source of androgens for the development of axillary and pubic hair before the beginning of puberty.

=== Medulla ===
The adrenal medulla is derived from neural crest cells, which come from the ectoderm layer of the embryo. These cells migrate from their initial position and aggregate in the vicinity of the dorsal aorta, a primitive blood vessel, which activates the differentiation of these cells through the release of proteins known as BMPs. These cells then undergo a second migration from the dorsal aorta to form the adrenal medulla and other organs of the sympathetic nervous system. Cells of the adrenal medulla are called chromaffin cells because they contain granules that stain with chromium salts, a characteristic not present in all sympathetic organs. Glucocorticoids produced in the adrenal cortex were once thought to be responsible for the differentiation of chromaffin cells. More recent research suggests that BMP-4 secreted in adrenal tissue is the main responsible for this, and that glucocorticoids only play a role in the subsequent development of the cells.

== Clinical significance ==
The normal function of the adrenal gland may be impaired by conditions such as infections, tumors, genetic disorders and autoimmune diseases, or as a side effect of medical therapy. These disorders affect the gland either directly (as with infections or autoimmune diseases) or as a result of the dysregulation of hormone production (as in some types of Cushing's syndrome) leading to an excess or insufficiency of adrenal hormones and the related symptoms.

=== Corticosteroid overproduction ===
==== Cushing's syndrome ====
Cushing's syndrome is the manifestation of glucocorticoid excess. It can be the result of a prolonged treatment with glucocorticoids or be caused by an underlying disease which produces alterations in the HPA axis or the production of cortisol. Causes can be further classified into ACTH-dependent or ACTH-independent. The most common cause of endogenous Cushing's syndrome is a pituitary adenoma which causes an excessive production of ACTH. The disease produces a wide variety of signs and symptoms which include obesity, diabetes, increased blood pressure, excessive body hair (hirsutism), osteoporosis, depression, and most distinctively, stretch marks in the skin, caused by its progressive thinning.

==== Primary aldosteronism ====
When the zona glomerulosa produces excess aldosterone, the result is primary aldosteronism. Causes for this condition are bilateral hyperplasia (excessive tissue growth) of the glands, or aldosterone-producing adenomas (a condition called Conn's syndrome). Primary aldosteronism produces hypertension and electrolyte imbalance, increasing potassium depletion sodium retention.

=== Adrenal insufficiency ===
Adrenal insufficiency (the deficiency of glucocorticoids) occurs in about 5 in 10,000 in the general population. Diseases classified as primary adrenal insufficiency (including Addison's disease and genetic causes) directly affect the adrenal cortex. If a problem that affects the hypothalamic–pituitary–adrenal axis arises outside the gland, it is a secondary adrenal insufficiency.

==== Addison's disease ====
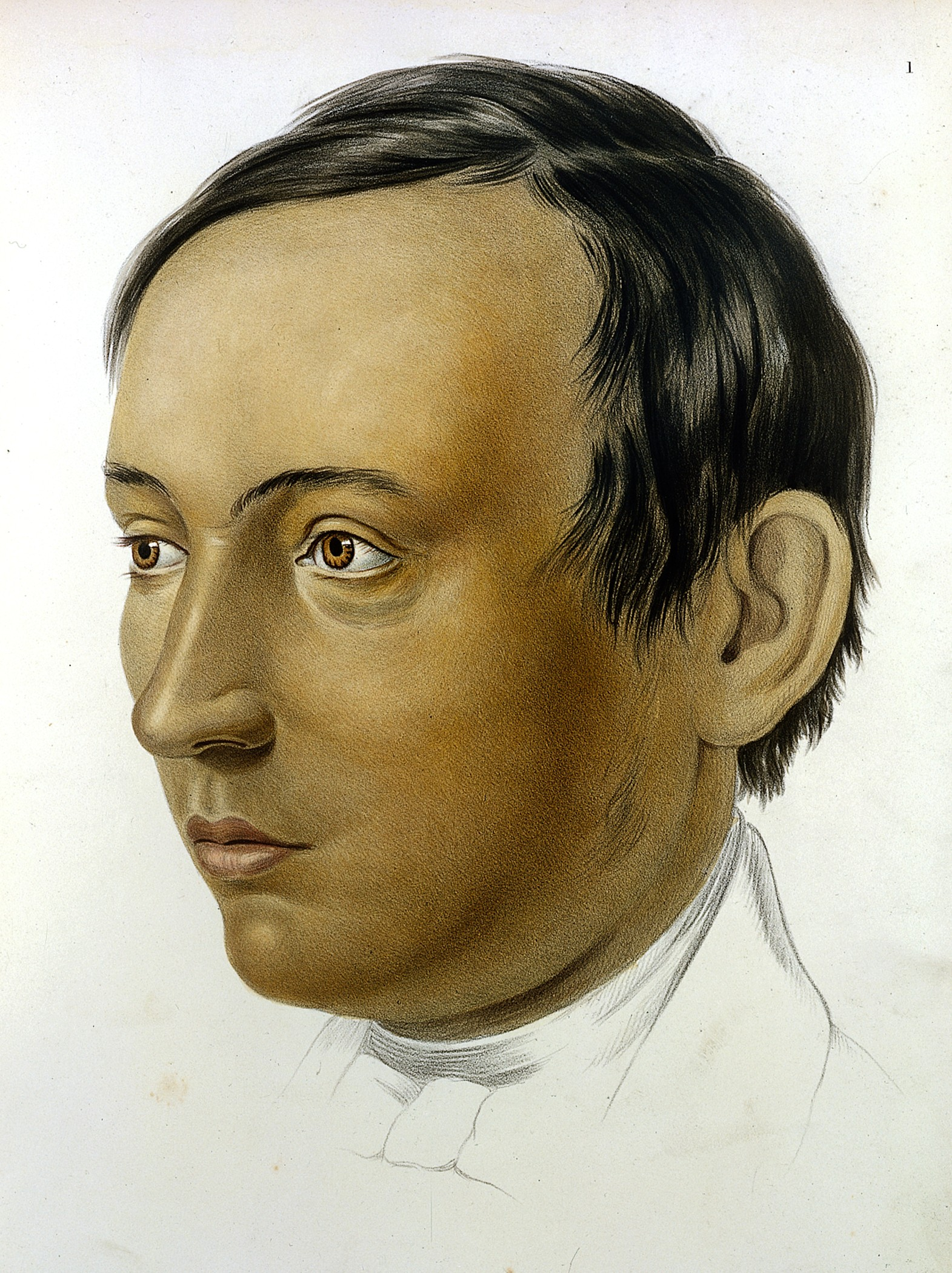
Characteristic skin hyperpigmentation in Addison's disease

Addison's disease refers to primary hypoadrenalism, which is a deficiency in glucocorticoid and mineralocorticoid production by the adrenal gland. In the Western world, Addison's disease is most commonly an autoimmune condition, in which the body produces antibodies against cells of the adrenal cortex. Worldwide, the disease is more frequently caused by infection, especially from tuberculosis. A distinctive feature of Addison's disease is hyperpigmentation of the skin, which presents with other nonspecific symptoms such as fatigue.

A complication seen in untreated Addison's disease and other types of primary adrenal insufficiency is the adrenal crisis, a medical emergency in which low glucocorticoid and mineralocorticoid levels result in hypovolemic shock and symptoms such as vomiting and fever. An adrenal crisis can progressively lead to stupor and coma. The management of adrenal crises includes the application of hydrocortisone injections.

==== Secondary adrenal insufficiency ====
In secondary adrenal insufficiency, a dysfunction of the hypothalamic–pituitary–adrenal axis leads to decreased stimulation of the adrenal cortex. Apart from suppression of the axis by glucocorticoid therapy, the most common cause of secondary adrenal insufficiency are tumors that affect the production of adrenocorticotropic hormone (ACTH) by the pituitary gland. This type of adrenal insufficiency usually does not affect the production of mineralocorticoids, which are under regulation of the renin–angiotensin system instead.

==== Congenital adrenal hyperplasia ====
Congenital adrenal hyperplasia is a family of congenital diseases in which mutations of enzymes that produce steroid hormones result in a glucocorticoid deficiency and malfunction of the negative feedback loop of the HPA axis. In the HPA axis, cortisol (a glucocorticoid) inhibits the release of CRH and ACTH, hormones that in turn stimulate corticosteroid synthesis. As cortisol cannot be synthesized, these hormones are released in high quantities and stimulate production of other adrenal steroids instead. The most common form of congenital adrenal hyperplasia is due to 21-hydroxylase deficiency. 21-hydroxylase is necessary for production of both mineralocorticoids and glucocorticoids, but not androgens. Therefore, ACTH stimulation of the adrenal cortex induces the release of excessive amounts of adrenal androgens, which can lead to the development of ambiguous genitalia and secondary sex characteristics.

=== Adrenal tumors ===
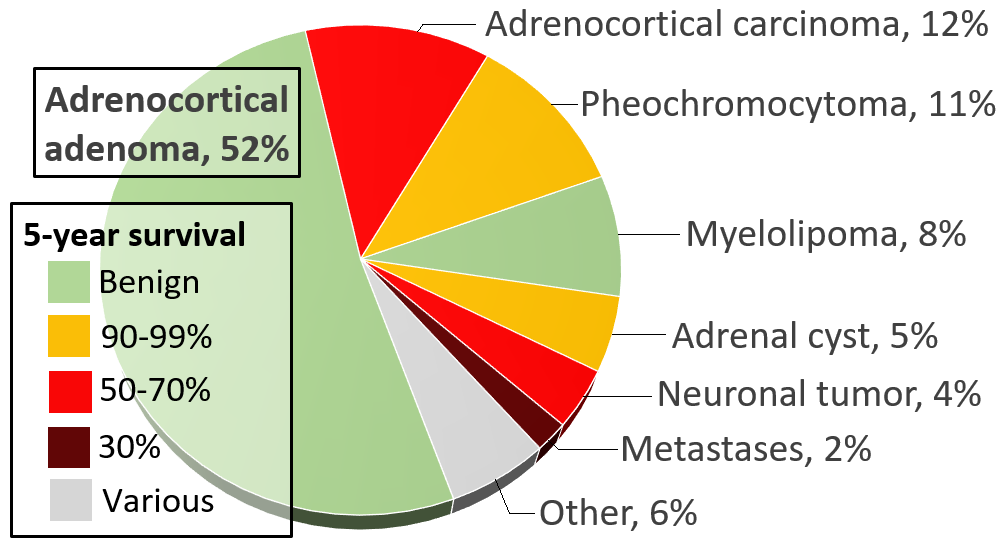
Incidences and prognoses of adrenal tumors.

Adrenal tumors are commonly found as incidentalomas, unexpected asymptomatic tumors found during medical imaging. They are seen in around 3.4% of CT scans, and in most cases they are benign adenomas. Adrenal carcinomas are very rare, with an incidence of 1 case per million per year.

Pheochromocytomas are tumors of the adrenal medulla that arise from chromaffin cells. They can produce a variety of nonspecific symptoms, which include headaches, sweating, anxiety and palpitations. Common signs include hypertension and tachycardia. Surgery, especially adrenal laparoscopy, is the most common treatment for small pheochromocytomas.

== History ==
Bartolomeo Eustachi, an Italian anatomist, is credited with the first description of the adrenal glands in 1563–4. However, these publications were part of the papal library and did not receive public attention, which was first received with Caspar Bartholin the Elder's illustrations in 1611.

The adrenal glands are named for their location relative to the kidneys. The term "adrenal" comes from Latin ad, "near", and ren, "kidney". Similarly, "suprarenal", as termed by Jean Riolan the Younger in 1629, is derived from the Latin supra, "above", and ren, "kidney", as well. The suprarenal nature of the glands was not truly accepted until the 19th century, as anatomists clarified the ductless nature of the glands and their likely secretory role – prior to this, there was some debate as to whether the glands were indeed suprarenal or part of the kidney.

One of the most recognized works on the adrenal glands came in 1855 with the publication of On the Constitutional and Local Effects of Disease of the Suprarenal Capsule, by the English physician Thomas Addison. In his monography, Addison described what the French physician George Trousseau would later name Addison's disease, an eponym still used today for a condition of adrenal insufficiency and its related clinical manifestations. In 1894, English physiologists George Oliver and Edward Schafer studied the action of adrenal extracts and observed their pressor effects. In the following decades several physicians experimented with extracts from the adrenal cortex to treat Addison's disease. Edward Calvin Kendall, Philip Hench and Tadeusz Reichstein were then awarded the 1950 Nobel Prize in Physiology or Medicine for their discoveries on the structure and effects of the adrenal hormones.

== See also ==
- Adrenopause
- Adrenochrome
- List of distinct cell types in the adult human body
- Adrenal insufficiency
- Adrenal gland disorder
