= Renal artery =

Vessel supplying blood to kidney

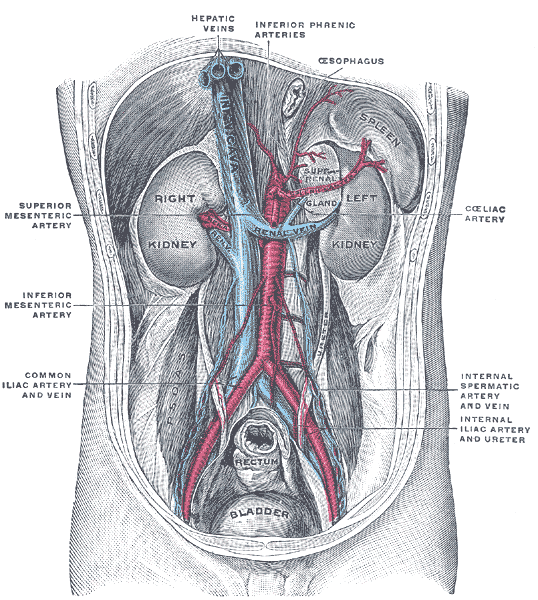
- Renal arteries branching left and right from the aorta (in red)

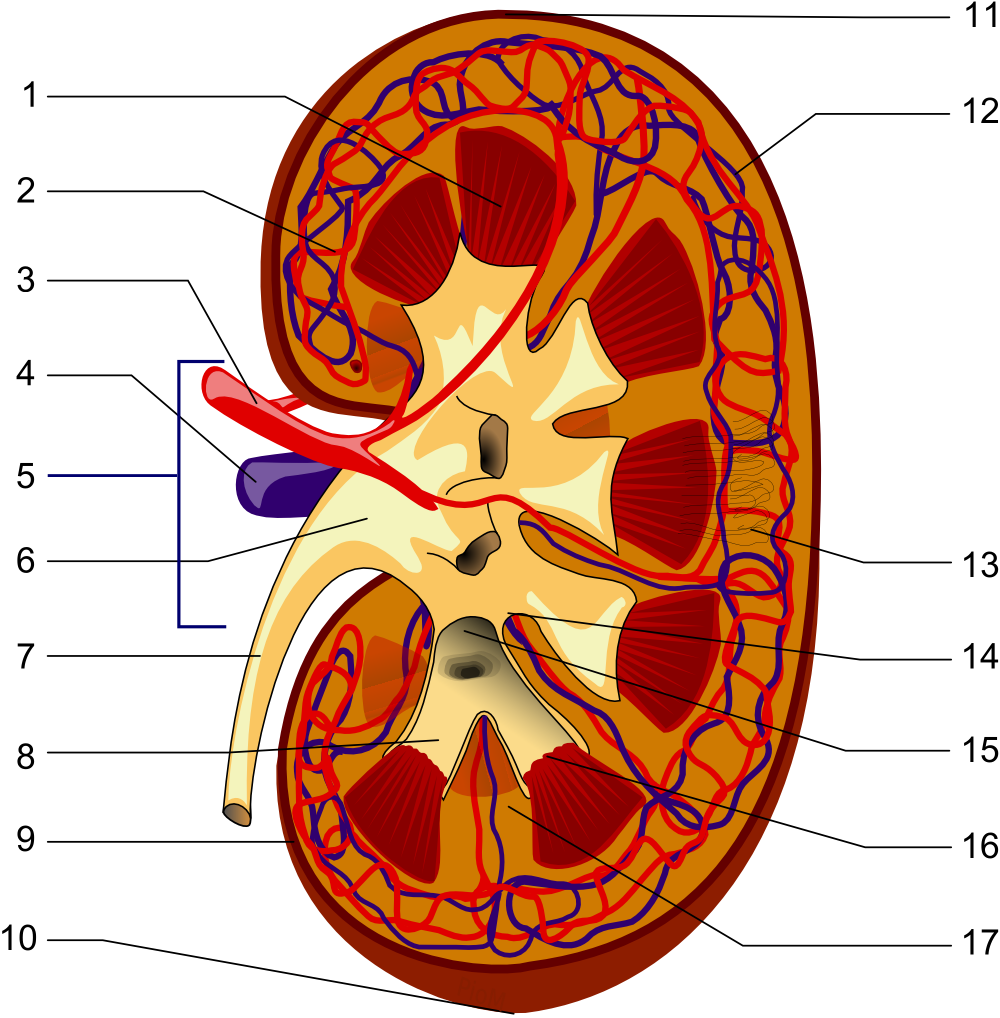
- 1. Renal pyramid; 2. Interlobular artery; 3. Renal artery; 4. Renal vein; 5. Renal hilum; 6. Renal pelvis; 7. Ureter; 8. Minor calyx; 9. Renal capsule; 10. Inferior renal capsule; 11. Superior renal capsule; 12. Interlobar vein; 13. Nephron; 14. Renal sinus; 15. Major calyx; 16. Renal papilla; 17. Renal column

Details
- Source: Abdominal aorta
- Branches: Inferior suprarenal artery, segmental arteries, ovarian artery
- Vein: Renal vein
- Supplies: Kidneys

Identifiers
- Latin: arteria renalis
- MeSH: D012077
- TA98: A12.2.12.075
- TA2: 4269
- FMA: 14751

The renal arteries are paired arteries that supply the kidneys with blood. Each is directed across the crus of the diaphragm, so as to form nearly a right angle.

The renal arteries carry a large portion of total blood flow to the kidneys. Up to a third of total cardiac output can pass through the renal arteries to be filtered by the kidneys.

== Structure ==
In typical anatomy, the renal arteries arise perpendicularly from the sides of the abdominal aorta, just below the origin of the superior mesenteric artery at the L1-L2 vertebral level. They have a radius of approximately 0.25 cm, 0.26 cm at the root. The measured mean diameter can differ depending on the imaging method used. For example, the diameter was found to be 5.04 ± 0.74 mm using ultrasound but 5.68 ± 1.19 mm using angiography.

Due to the anatomical position of the aorta, the inferior vena cava, and the kidneys, the right renal artery is normally longer than the left renal artery.

- The right passes behind the inferior vena cava, the right renal vein, the head of the pancreas, and the descending part of the duodenum. It’s somewhat lower than the left one.
- Left artery lies behind the left renal vein, the body of the pancreas and the splenic vein, and is crossed by the inferior mesenteric vein.

=== Branches ===
Before reaching the hilus of the kidney, each artery divides into four or five branches. The anterior branches (the upper, middle, lower and apical segmental arteries) lie between the renal vein and ureter, the vein being in front, the ureter behind. The posterior branches, which are fewer in number and include the posterior segmental artery, are usually situated behind the ureter.

Each vessel gives off some small inferior suprarenal branches to the suprarenal gland, the ureter, and the surrounding cellular tissue and muscles.

One or two accessory renal arteries are frequently found, especially on the left side since they usually arise from the aorta, and may come off above (more common) or below the main artery. Instead of entering the kidney at the hilus, they usually pierce the upper or lower part of the organ.

=== Variation ===
The arterial supply of the kidneys is variable and there may be one or more renal arteries supplying each kidney. It is located above the renal vein. Supernumerary renal arteries (two or more arteries to a single kidney) are the most common renovascular anomaly, occurrence ranging from 25% to 40% of kidneys. Aberrant renal arteries may be present, and may complicate surgical procedures.

== Clinical significance ==
=== Stenosis ===
Renal artery stenosis, or narrowing of one or both renal arteries will lead to hypertension as the affected kidneys release renin to increase blood pressure to preserve perfusion to the kidneys. RAS is typically diagnosed with duplex ultrasonography of the renal arteries. It is treated with the use of balloon angioplasty and stents, if necessary.

=== Atherosclerosis ===
Atherosclerosis can also affect the renal arteries and can lead to poor perfusion of the kidneys leading to reduced kidney function and, possibly, renal failure

=== Renal artery aneurysm ===
A dilated renal artery measuring twice its normal size indicates a renal artery aneurysm.

=== Trauma ===
A renal artery is damaged in 4% of blunt traumas and 7% of penetrating traumas to the abdomen.

== Additional images ==
Volume rendered CT scan of abdominal and pelvic blood vessels.

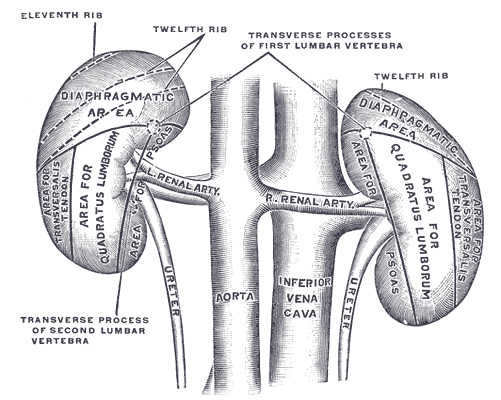
The posterior surfaces of the kidneys, showing areas of relation to the parietes.

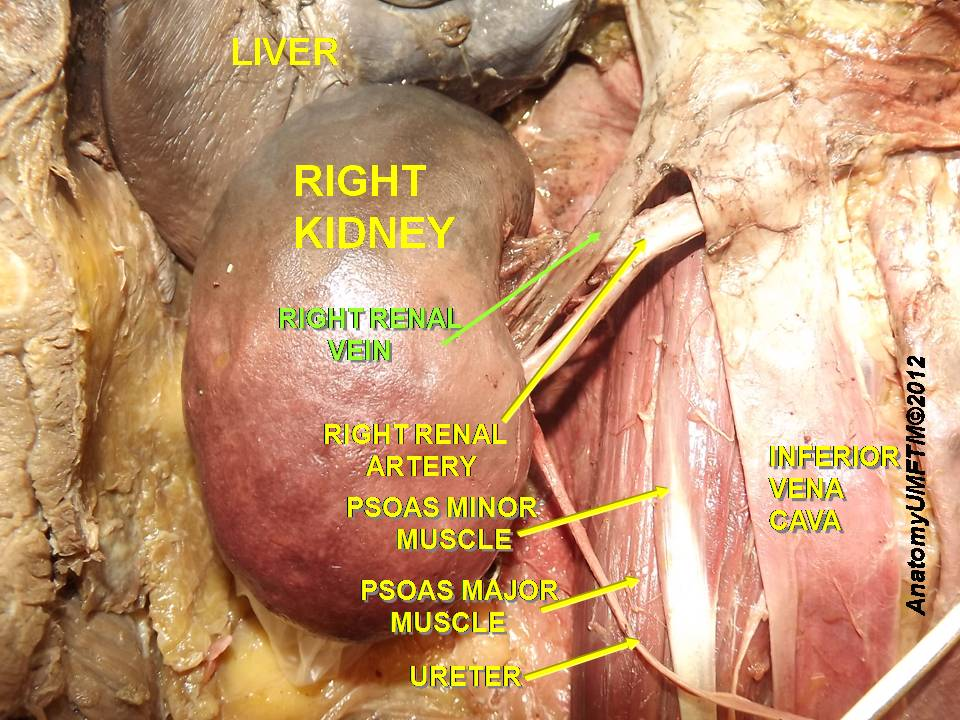
Renal artery

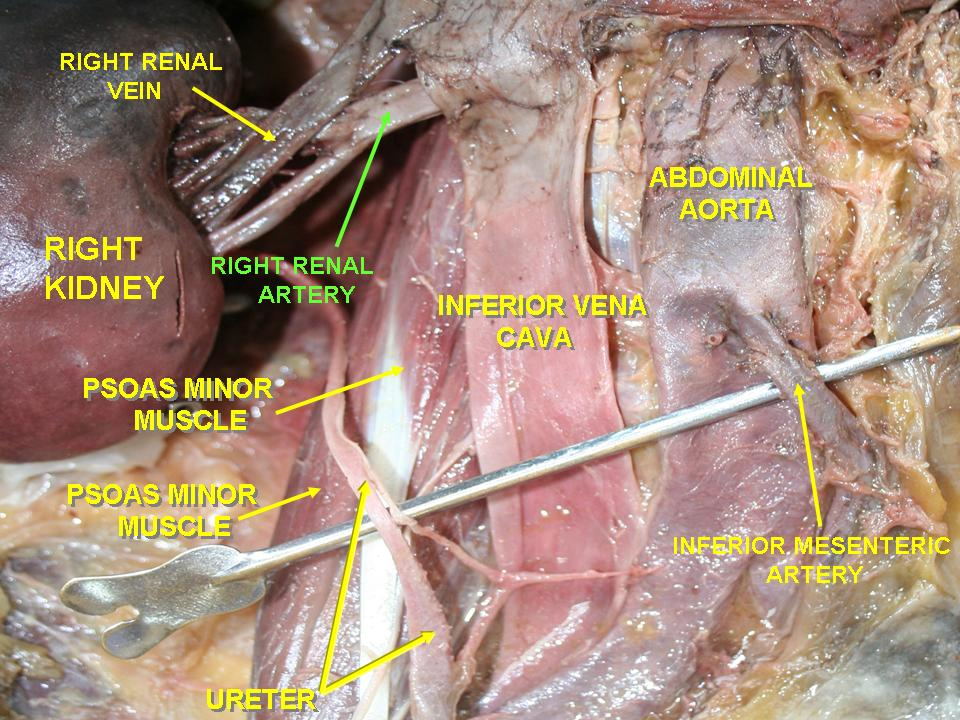
Renal artery

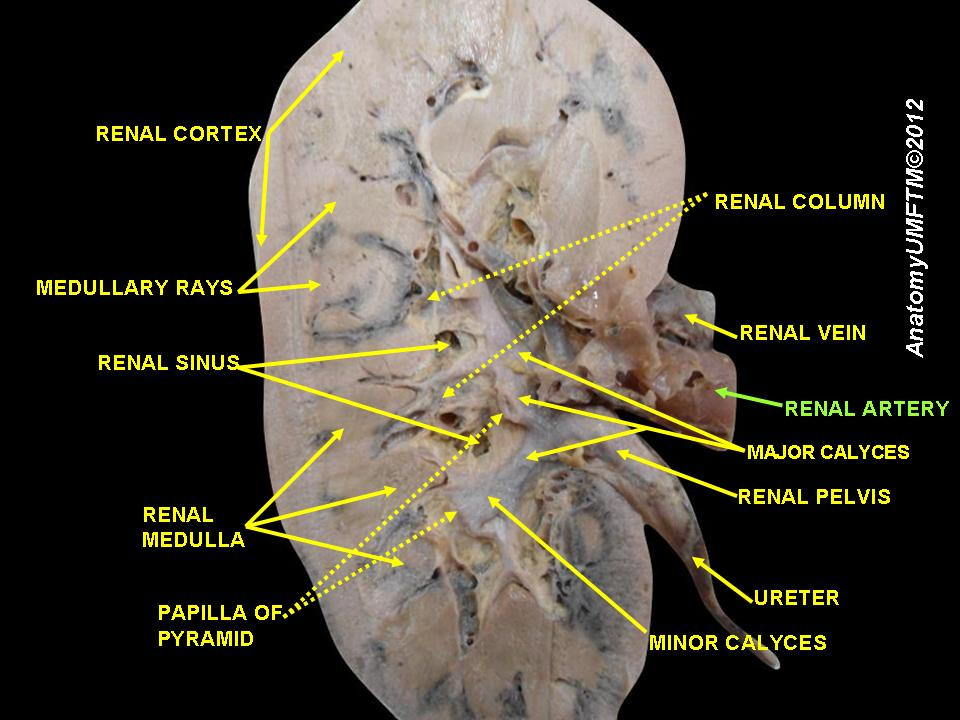
Renal artery

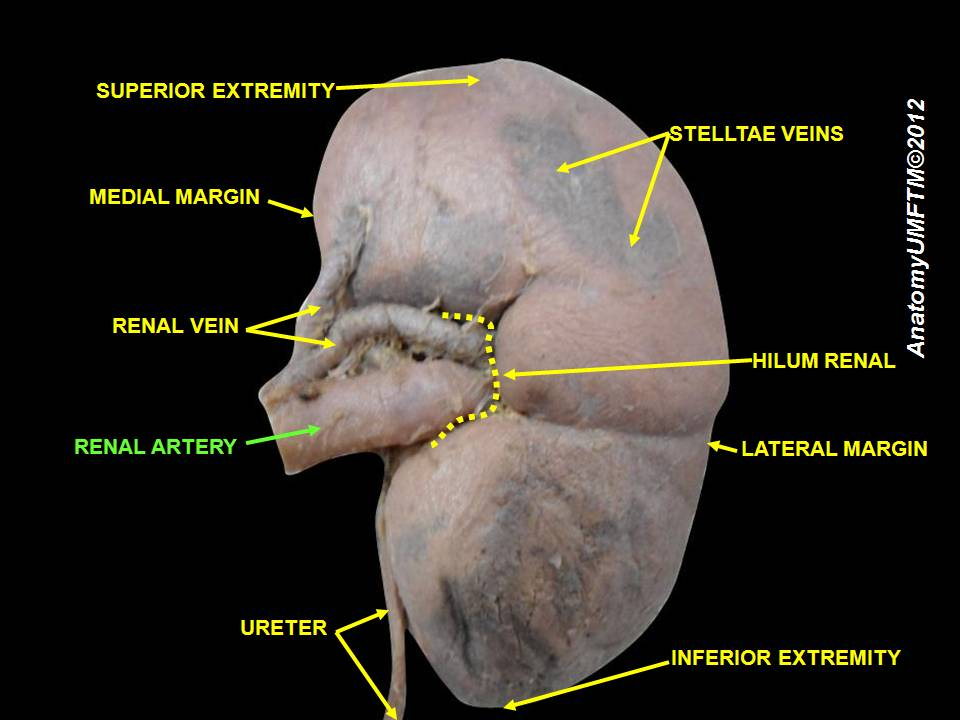
Renal artery
