= Inferior phrenic arteries =

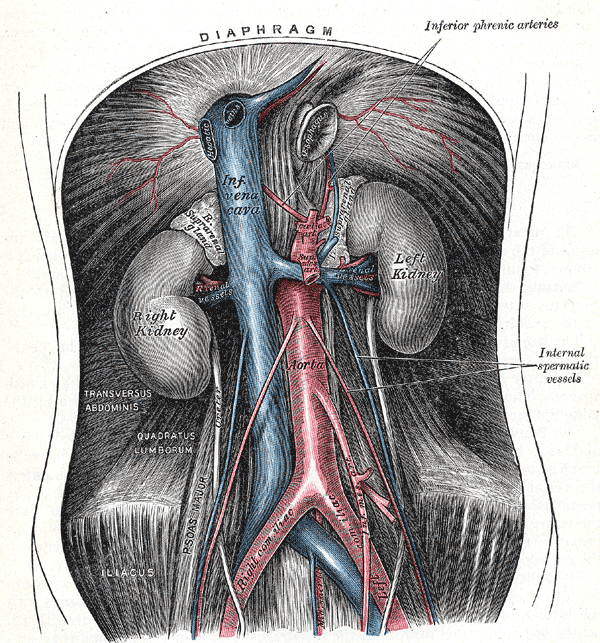
- The abdominal aorta and its branches (inferior phrenic arteries labeled at upper right)

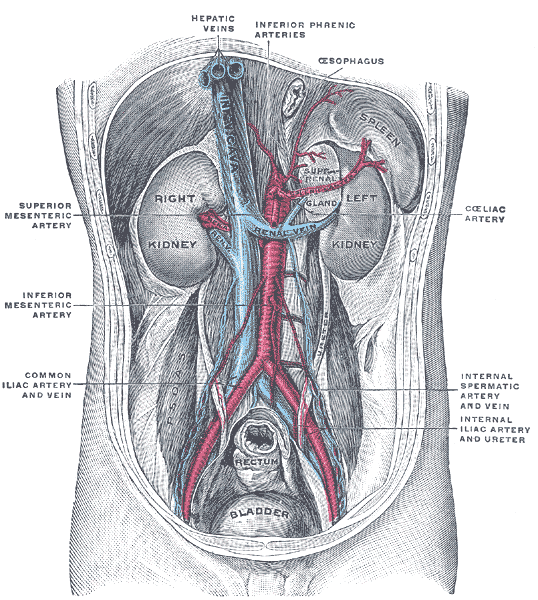
- Posterior abdominal wall, after removal of the peritoneum, showing kidneys, suprarenal capsules, and great vessels

Details
- Source: Abdominal aorta
- Branches: Superior suprarenal artery
- Vein: Inferior phrenic vein
- Supplies: Thoracic diaphragm

Identifiers
- Latin: arteriae phrenicae inferiores
- TA98: A12.2.12.002
- TA2: 4206
- FMA: 14734

The inferior phrenic artery is a bilaterally paired artery of the abdominal cavity which represents the main source of arterial supply to the diaphragm. Each artery usually arises either from the coeliac trunk or the abdominal aorta, however, their origin is highly variable and the different sites of origin are different for the left artery and right artery. The superior suprarenal artery is a branch of the inferior phrenic artery.

== Structure ==
=== Origin ===
The inferior phrenic arteries vary considerably in their site of origin. typically arise from either the coeliac trunk or (the anterior aspect of) abdominal part of aorta (just superior to the coeliac trunk); the two arteries arise either separately or as a common trunk. The inferior phrenic arteries usually arise at the level corresponding to between T12 and L2 vertebrae.

The right inferior phrenic artery may less often arise from the right renal artery, left gastric artery, hepatic artery proper.

The left inferior phrenic artery may less often arise from either renal artery, left gastric artery, or hepatic artery proper.

=== Course and relations ===
The artery courses beneath the posterior portion of the parietal peritoneum. Each artery passes superoanteriorly and laterally to reach and cross the crura of diaphragm, passing close to the medial border of the ipsilateral suprarenal gland.

=== Termination ===
Each artery splits into a medial branch and a lateral branch near the posterior border of the central tendon of diaphragm. Alternatively, it may terminate by trifurcating into an anterior, a middle, and a posterior branch.

Left inferior phrenic artery

The left phrenic passes posterior the esophagus, then anterior-ward upon the left side of the esophageal hiatus, past the left side of the oesophageal hiatus.

Right inferior phrenic artery

The right phrenic passes posterior to the inferior vena cava. It passes past the right side of the caval opening.

=== Branches ===
- The medial branch curves anterior-ward, and anastomoses with its fellow of the opposite side, and with the musculophrenic and pericardiacophrenic arteries.
- The lateral branch passes toward the side of the thorax, and anastomoses with the lower intercostal arteries, and with the musculophrenic. The lateral branch of the right phrenic gives off a few vessels to the inferior vena cava; and the left one, some branches to the esophagus.

=== Distribution ===
The inferior phrenic arteries are the main source of arterial supply to the diaphragm.

Each of the smaller vessels give a superior suprarenal artery to the ipsilateral supradrenal gland. The spleen and the liver also receive a few twigs from the left and right vessels respectively.
