= Inferior suprarenal artery =

Artery that supplies the adrenal gland

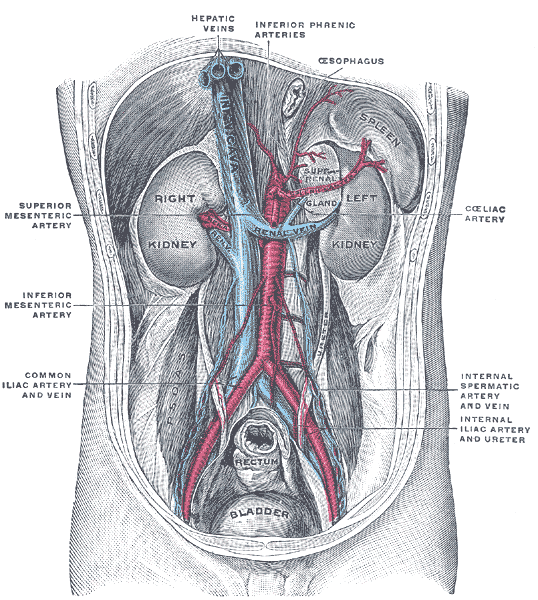
- Posterior abdominal wall, after removal of the peritoneum, showing kidneys, suprarenal capsules, and great vessels

Details
- Source: Renal artery
- Vein: Suprarenal veins
- Supplies: Adrenal gland

Identifiers
- Latin: arteria suprarenalis inferior
- TA98: A12.2.12.077
- TA2: 4271
- FMA: 69264

The inferior suprarenal artery is a paired artery that supplies the adrenal gland. It usually originates at the trunk of the renal artery before its terminal division, but with many common variations. It supplies the adrenal gland parenchyma, the ureter, and the surrounding cellular tissue and muscles.

== Structure ==
The inferior suprarenal artery usually originates at the trunk of the renal artery. This is usually on its superior surface before its terminal division. It enters the parenchyma of the adrenal gland.

=== Variations ===
Variations in the inferior suprarenal artery are common. It usually originates from the renal artery before its final divisions, but may also originate as a final division or after the final divisions. More rarely, it may originate directly from the aorta. It may give off a small branch to the kidney.

There may be two or three inferior suprarenal arteries in some people. Its diameter changes significantly with age.

== Function ==
The inferior suprarenal artery supplies the adrenal gland (suprarenal gland). They also supply the ureter and some surrounding tissue and skeletal muscle.

== Clinical significance ==
The inferior suprarenal artery may be affected by an aneurysm. It may be assessed using Doppler ultrasound.

== History ==
The inferior suprarenal artery may also be known as the inferior adrenal artery.

== See also ==
- Adrenal gland
- Aorta
- Superior suprarenal artery
- Middle suprarenal arteries
