= Suprarenal veins =

Veins to the adrenal glands

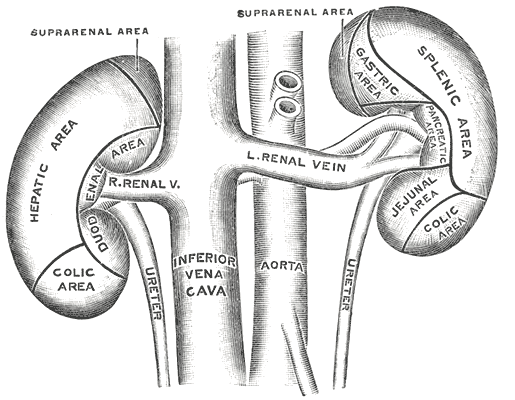
- The anterior surfaces of the kidneys, showing the areas of contact of neighboring viscera

Details
- Drains from: Adrenal gland
- Artery: Superior suprarenal artery, middle suprarenal artery, inferior suprarenal artery

Identifiers
- Latin: venae suprarenales
- TA98: A12.3.09.011; A12.3.09.013
- TA2: 4998, 5012
- FMA: 14348

The suprarenal veins are two in number:

- the right ends in the inferior vena cava.
- the left ends in the left renal or left inferior phrenic vein.

They receive blood from the adrenal glands and will sometimes form anastomoses with the inferior phrenic veins.

== Additional images ==
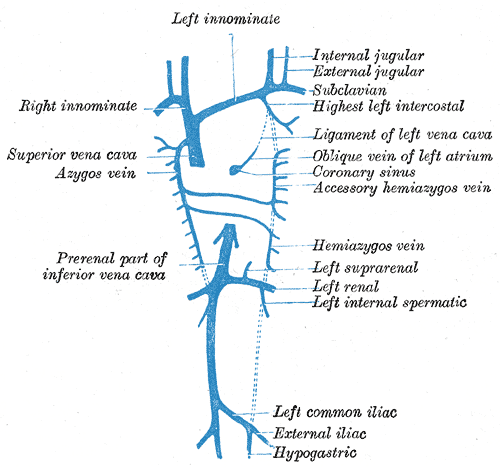
Diagram showing completion of development of the parietal veins

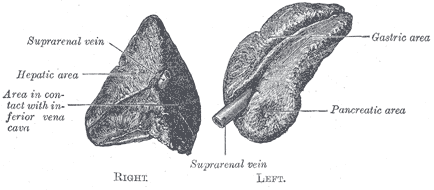
Suprarenal glands viewed from the front

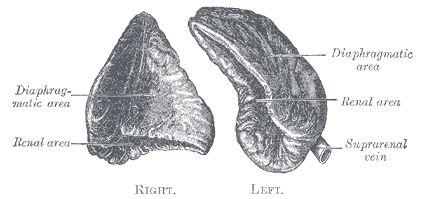
Suprarenal glands viewed from behind
