= Superior suprarenal artery =

Artery of the abdomen

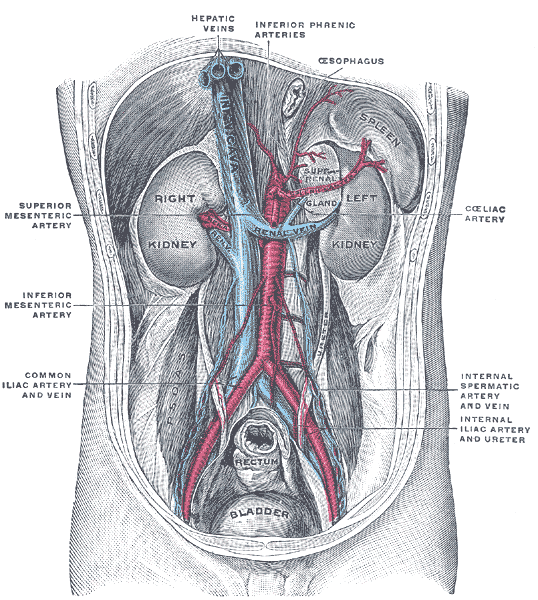
- Posterior abdominal wall, after removal of the peritoneum, showing kidneys, suprarenal capsules, and great vessels

Details
- Source: Inferior phrenic artery
- Vein: Suprarenal veins
- Supplies: Adrenal gland

Identifiers
- Latin: arteria suprarenales superior
- TA98: A12.2.12.003
- TA2: 4207
- FMA: 14863

The superior suprarenal artery is an artery in the abdomen. It is a branch of the inferior phrenic artery, itself a branch of the aorta. It supplies the adrenal gland.

== Structure ==
The superior suprarenal artery is a branch of the inferior phrenic artery. There may be multiple branches, each of which is fairly small. The inferior phrenic artery is itself is a branch of the aorta. The phrenic artery supplies the diaphragm.

== Function ==
The superior suprarenal artery supplies the adrenal gland. It may be more important during prenatal development.

== Clinical significance ==
The superior suprarenal artery may be assessed using Doppler ultrasound.

== History ==
The superior suprarenal artery may also be known as the superior adrenal artery.

== See also ==
- Middle suprarenal arteries
- Inferior suprarenal artery
