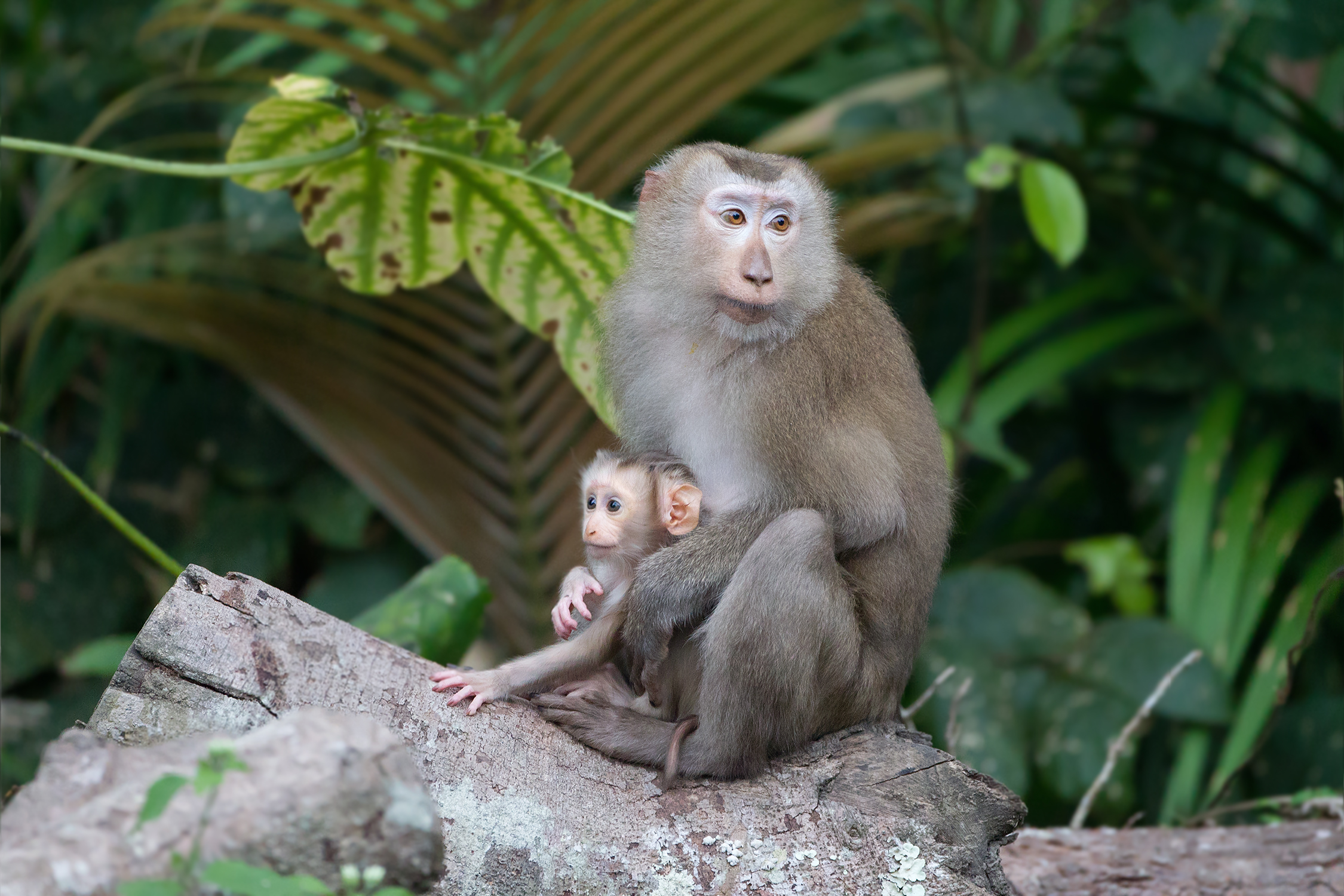
- M. leonina female with baby in Khao Yai National Park, Thailand

Conservation status
- Vulnerable (IUCN 3.1)

Scientific classification
- Kingdom: Animalia
- Phylum: Chordata
- Class: Mammalia
- Infraclass: Placentalia
- Order: Primates
- Family: Cercopithecidae
- Genus: Macaca
- Species: M. leonina

Binomial name
- Macaca leonina (Blyth, 1863)
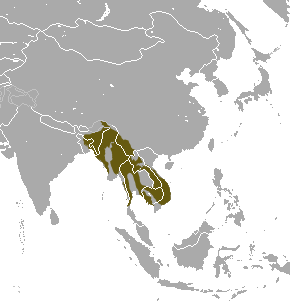
- Northern pig-tailed macaque range

= Northern pig-tailed macaque =

Species of Old World monkey

The northern pig-tailed macaque (Macaca leonina) is a vulnerable species of macaque in the subfamily Cercopithecidae. It is found in Bangladesh, Cambodia, China, India, Laos, Myanmar, Thailand, and Vietnam. Traditionally, M. leonina was considered a subspecies of the southern pig-tailed macaque (M. nemestrina), but is now classified as an individual species. In the 21st century, the pig-tailed macaque was split into the northern pig-tailed macaque species Macaca leonina and the Sundaland pig-tailed macaque species M. nemestrina. This reclassification was aided by the observation of sexual swellings and basic attributes that distinguish the two. The northern pig-tailed macaque is frugivorous and their social grouping is matriarchal, where sexual dimorphic traits can distinguish males and females. Their adaptation to omnivorous diets occur in periods of fruit scarcity, munching on wild vegetation and crops, human foods, and small insects and mammals. Despite their adaptability, northern-pig tailed macaques experience viral threats such as the human immunodeficiency virus type 1, pathogenic simian immunodeficiency, and coronavirus. Human impacts are also present, such as agricultural expansions, aquaculture, transportation infrastructure, hunting and logging for meat and trophies, and the illegal pet trade; that result in habitat loss, forest fragmentation, and a reduced well-being.

== Physical characteristics ==
=== Appearance ===
Physical characteristics identifiers in distinguishing the northern and the southern pig-tailed macaques. Northern pig-tailed macaques have a round greyish pelage from the side of their cheeks all the way around to the top of their head and beneath their chin, which is called a crown. A brown pelage patch is found on the centre of their crowns followed by white triangular forms beneath this patch and along the top of their eyes. One red stripe is found at each exterior corner of their eyes which are angled upwards and diagonally meeting at the ending point of the white triangular eye extremities. Their elongated muzzle is still shorter when compared to southern pig-tailed macaques.

On their backs, for mostly males, a black streak is found at the centre; and can sometimes have a red hue towards the top and black towards the bottom. Moving downwards, their tails are composed of a thin pelage in a dark blackish hue and are shorter and skinnier than southern pig-tailed macaques. Tail shapes vary, however, the most common is a 90 degree point to the back, followed by a 45 degree, a forward and parallel, a forward arch meeting its back, pointed downwards. Beneath their tail, on their backside, there are oval shaped thick sitting pads that cover their hip bones, known as ischial callosities.

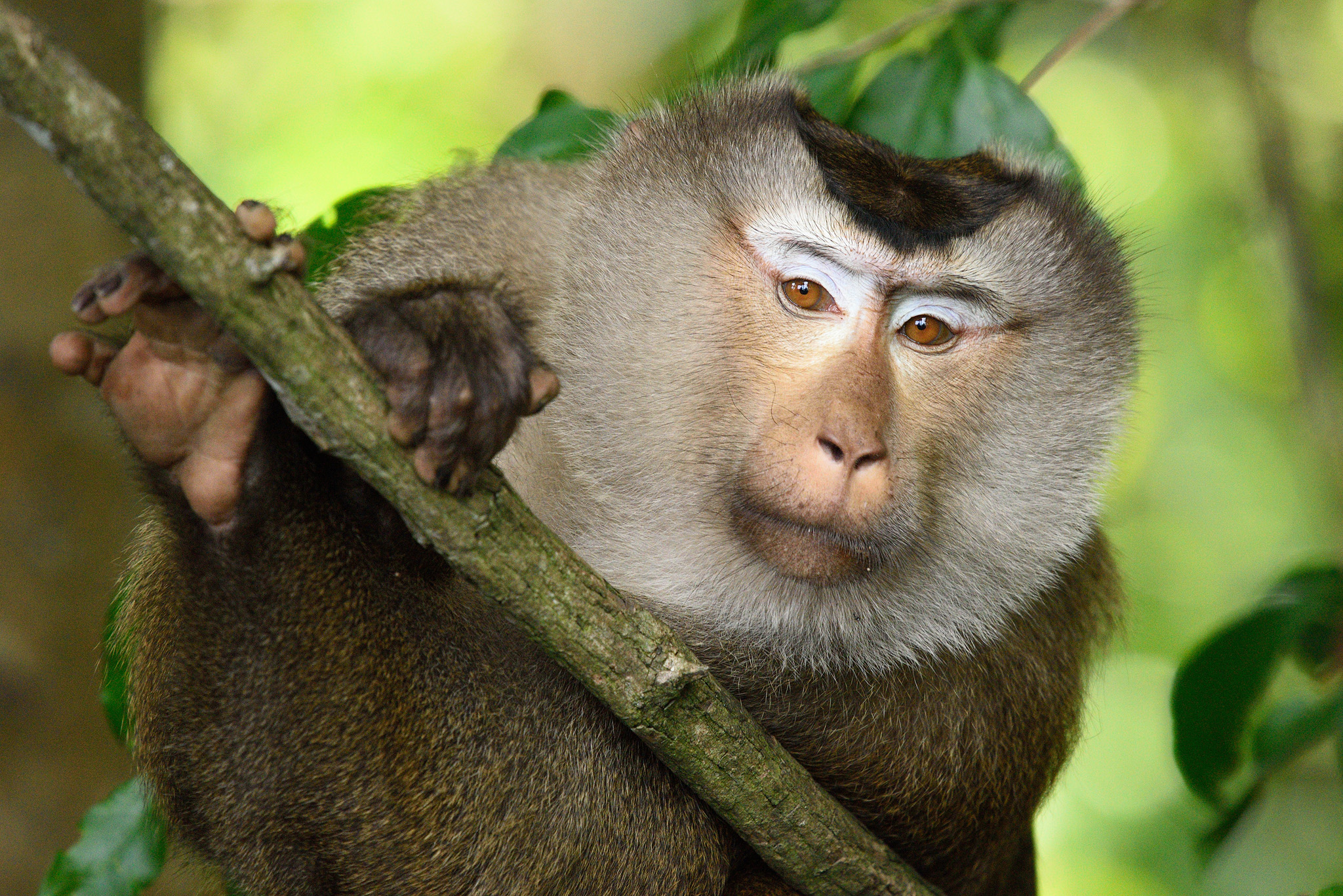
Alpha male, Khao Yai National Park, Thailand

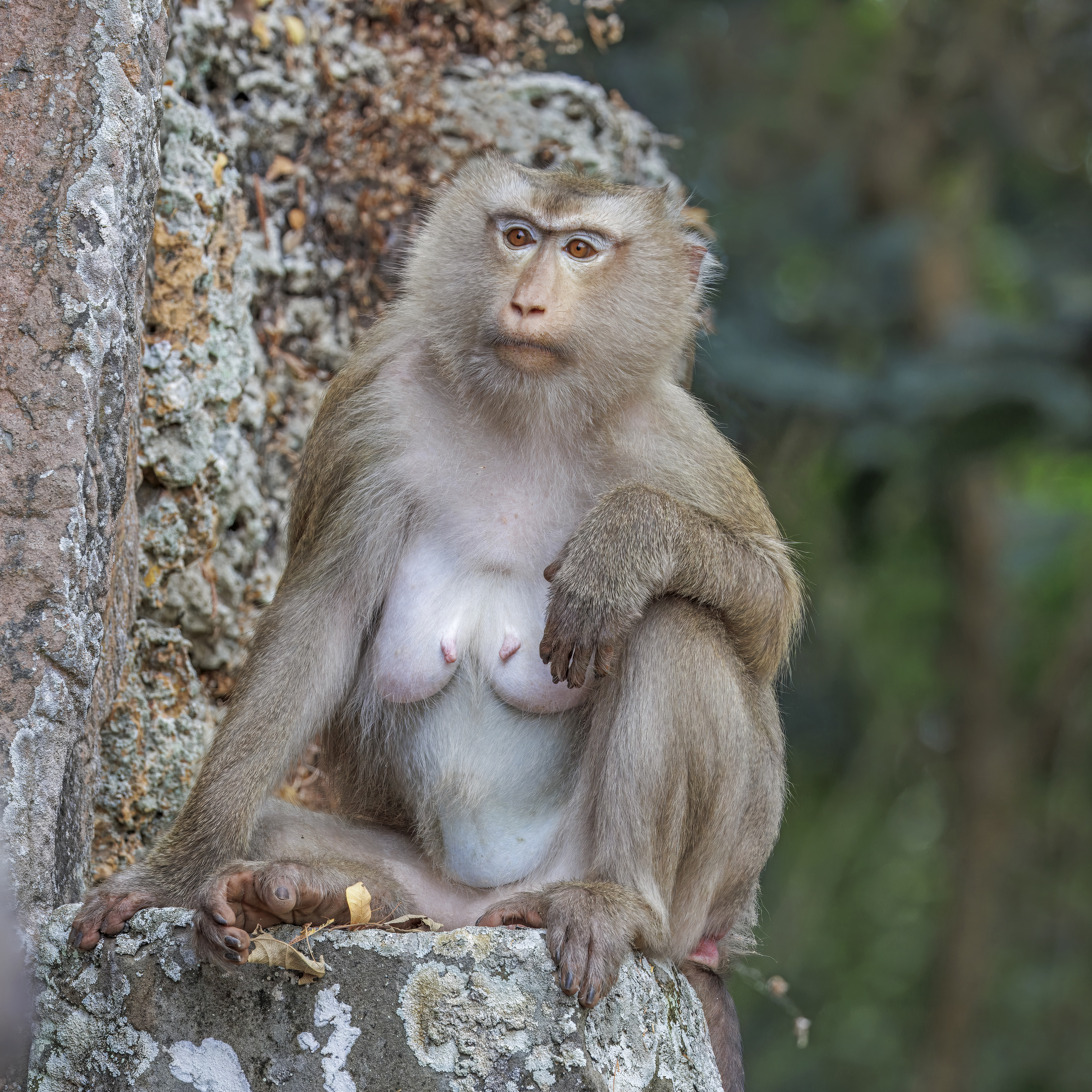
female, Angkor Wat, Cambodia

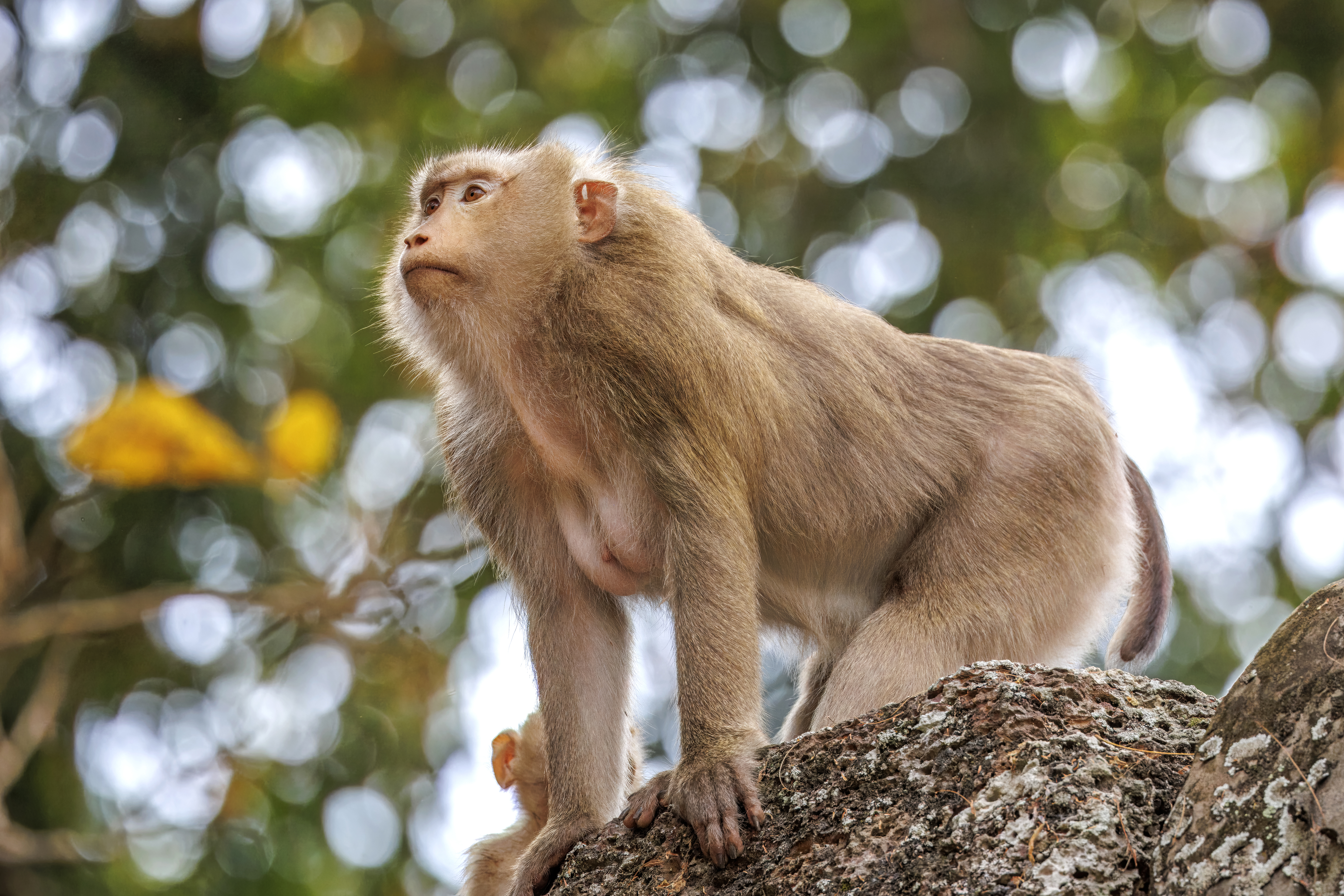
female, Angkor Wat, Cambodia

=== Sex differences ===
The northern-pig tailed macaques have sexual dimorphic traits. Body weight is the most obvious indicator to distinguish males from females, where males are found over eight kg give or take, and females below six kg. Adult males are identified with defined shoulder musculature and exhibit red coloured sexual organs, such as their penis and anus. Their tails are also found to be longer relative to females and their pelage has more darker contrast to it. Adult females are smaller in size and are found to have sexual swelling in the same regions, yet are more vibrant red than in males.

Male teenagers, known as subadult males, do not have red coloured sexual organs, yet have dropped testicles. Infants fit into the age range of five to eight weeks old and are usually found eating solid foods, yet those older than nine weeks are studied to be independent of their mothers until a certain distance is travelled. Newborns are up to four weeks old usually found feeding on breast milk, and are usually near their mother's stomachs while in motion or are cradled in their arms.

== Distribution and habitat ==
=== China ===
The Macaca leonina can also be found in tropical forests in southwestern China. A study conducted in the Naban River Watershed National Nature Reserve found that the species has a wider distribution and greater niche breath than Macaca mulatta based on camera trapping data within the area. Groups of Macaca leonina were found scattered in forests with higher elevations, more specifically broadleaved evergreen forests when compared to the other species. Yet, they avoided rubber plantations as a result of their habitat being severely reduced in size, which restricted their ability to access food resources and blocked travel to other regions of the reserve. With extensive data collection, the results showed that both species were well adapted to their degraded environment by consistently following daily activity budgets, including the regions chosen for preferred elevation and vegetation. However, the season had an impact on both species activity budgets as it altered due to the presence of rainfall within monsoonal periods. In the dry-hot season, the space became more restricted to both species because the once vegetation rich region became limited and required a change of activity patterns for both species.

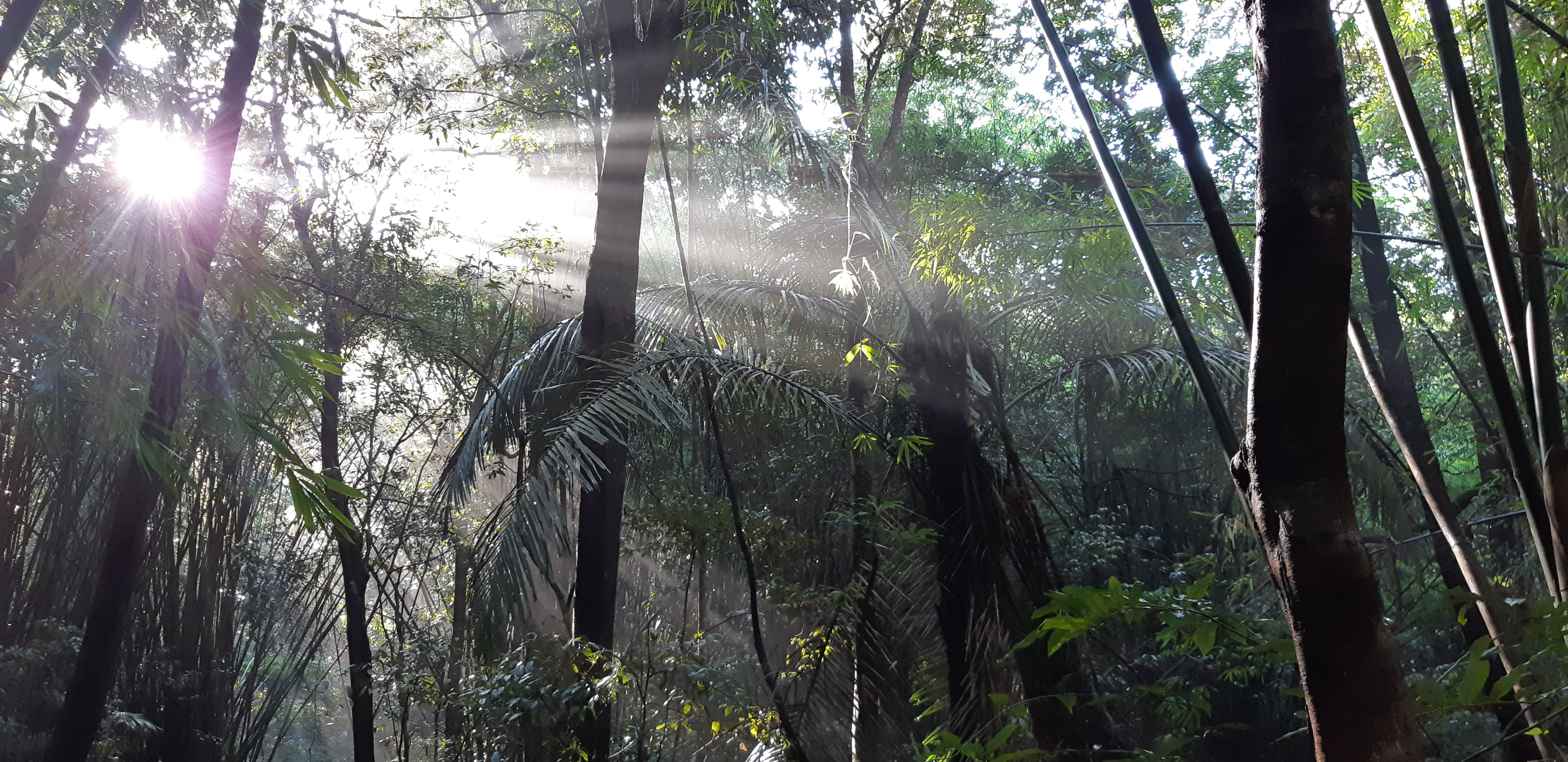
Mixed bamboo and semi-evergreen forest in Keo Seima Wildlife Sanctuary

=== India ===
In India, the northern pig-tailed macaque is found south of the Brahmaputra River, in the northeastern part of the country. Its range in India extends from Assam and Meghalaya to eastern Aruanchal Pradesh, Nagaland, Manipur, Mizoram and Tripura. A detailed report on the ecology and behaviour of northern pig-tailed macaque has been published in 2008.

Although no global population estimate is available, some site-based estimates are, including Keo Seima Wildlife Sanctuary in Cambodia, where an increasing population of almost 4,000 is reported.

=== Thailand ===
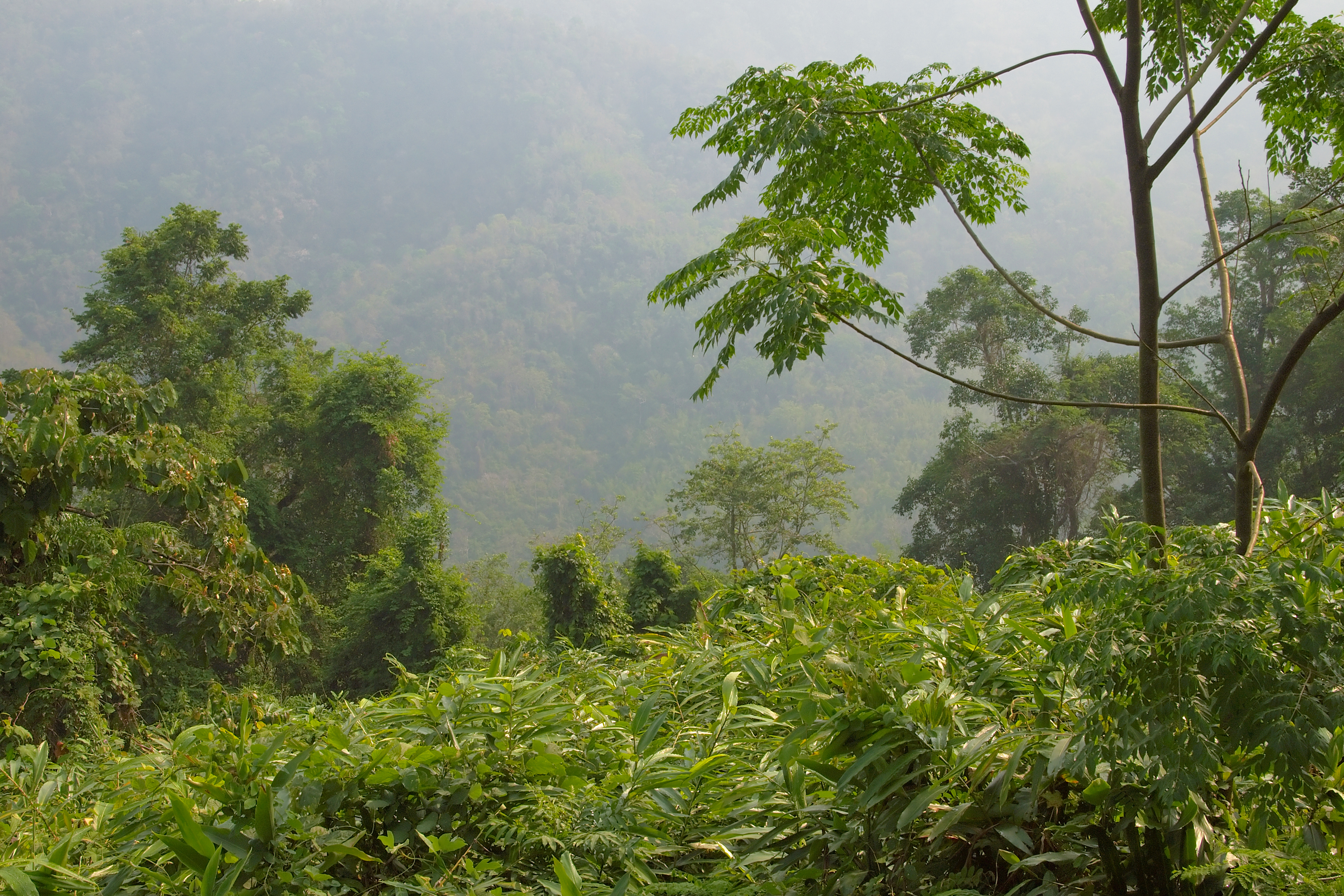
Tropical evergreen grassland, Khao Yai National Park, Thailand

Northern pig-tailed macaques are also found in Northeastern Thailand shown to be impacted by anthropogenic influences such as deforestation and forest alterations. Their home range sizes vary from 62 to 828 hectares, similar to the southern pig-tailed macaques Macaca nemestrina. However, their ability to travel is often limited due to habitat degradation and transformation with no limit to elevation unless there is less canopy cover per area.

In the Sakaerat Biosphere Reserve, the region was about eighty kilometres of dry evergreen forest, old growth acacia forest, and dry dipterocarp forest; yet it slowly transformed into fragments of eucalyptus plantations, agricultural expansions, highway constructions, and human settlements. This change of native habitat eventually led to a study in 2017 and 2018 by Gazagne et al., observing a range of 128 and 150 northern pig-tailed macaques and their selection of 107 sleeping sites. Some examples of potential predators in this region are the clouded leopard Neofelis nebulosa and two species of pythons known as Python reticulatus and Python bivittatus. The authors found that the macaques still preferred sleeping sites with two layers of canopy for protection, however no predator conflicts were recorded nor impacting site selection. The authors then concluded that food proximity had a larger influence on the sleeping site selection than canopy, since food sites were often found near their sleeping sites or they were sleeping within them. The scattered food availability and reduced sleeping sites also contributed to forming the largest social group of northern pig-tailed macaques observed.

== Ecology and behaviour ==
=== Diet ===
Northern pig-tailed macaques are frugivorous as they tend to forage for hundreds of fruit species such as fleshy and dry; as well as flowers and buds, piths, leaves, and shoot species that makeup more than fifty percent of their diet. Due to limited fruit availability in colder seasons or with habitat degradation, the macaques are found to become more omnivorous due to reliance on human food resources such as "rice, bread, biscuits"; and can also be found munching on fungi, ants, termites, spiders, stickbuds, grasshoppers, caterpillars, beetles, mushrooms, barks, eggs, lizards, and squirrels.

==== Group strategies ====
Despite their limited and varied accessibility to their main food resources and habitat transformations, the northern pig-tailed macaques adapt to their environments by altering how their social groups are formed and composed. Group sizes are shown to increase as a response to low connectivity within feeding sites, and tend to become more sedentary when relying on human food resources for nutrition. The opposite is true for their group sizes and lifestyle within more wild environments, where smaller groups and nomadic patterns are more common.

Groups are fairly large within this species which can exceed over one hundred fifty individuals. However, they split into smaller groups when feeding and rejoin for larger group travel. They are also found to vary their home range depending on the season, as the fruit availability and quality varies. In low fruit abundance periods, the macaques are shown to travel to human settlements, which Gazagne et al., say is a practice of a "high-cost, high yield foraging strategy" as seen within plantation forests. Northern pig-tailed macaques are found to prefer fruits from plantation forests when wild ones are scarce. Their home range, however, increases as a result of high fruit abundance periods, where they are found settling near specific fruits species within forest habitats. Therefore, they use different strategies to forage for food depending on what environments show abundance or low abundance, and their seasonality. When plantations are abundant, they are found using more energy costs to travel to the region due to its high yields, therefore they are likely to increase their travels and trajectories. When wild resources are abundant, such as within dry evergreen forests, the species uses less energy costs as they remain in smaller ranges to gain more yields. However, with low abundance in both regions, the strategy is to create a balance between both strategies described above.

=== Mating and reproduction ===
Social groups are matriarchal just like all macaque species are, therefore females exercise dominance within social groups. Mating occurs when females attract males with reddened sexual skin swellings which occur due to hormone fluctuations during ovulation, their receptive period. Female swellings are common signs of fertility that can continue past the periovulatory period. The receptive period is identified with continuous mating patterns, where males practice a single or multiple mount process, within a few days in a row. A visible sperm plug can also be identified during this period of copulation. The duration of female pregnancies exceed the eight-month period for a single offspring and are followed by lactation for feeding newborns and infants up to two years of age.

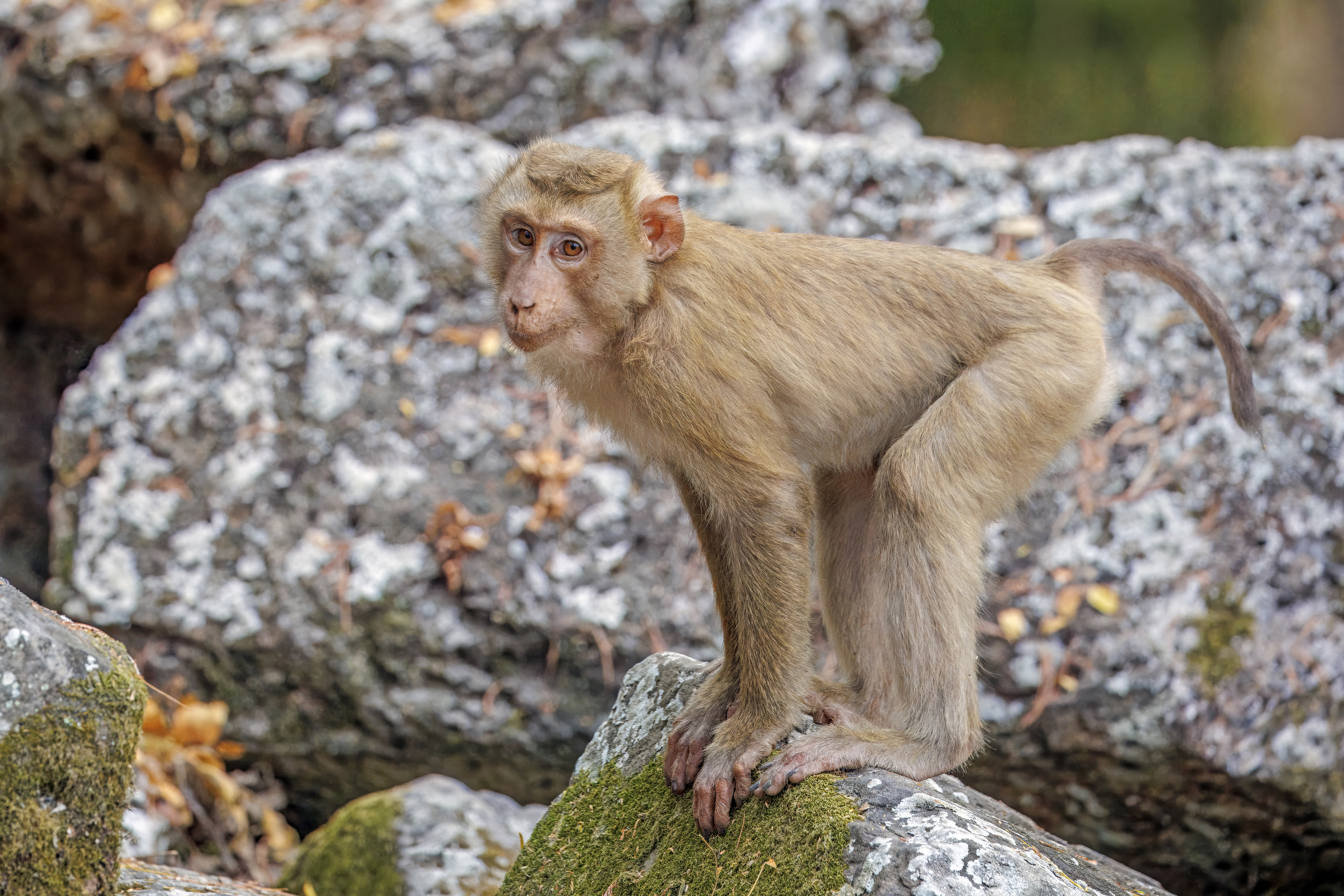
juvenile male

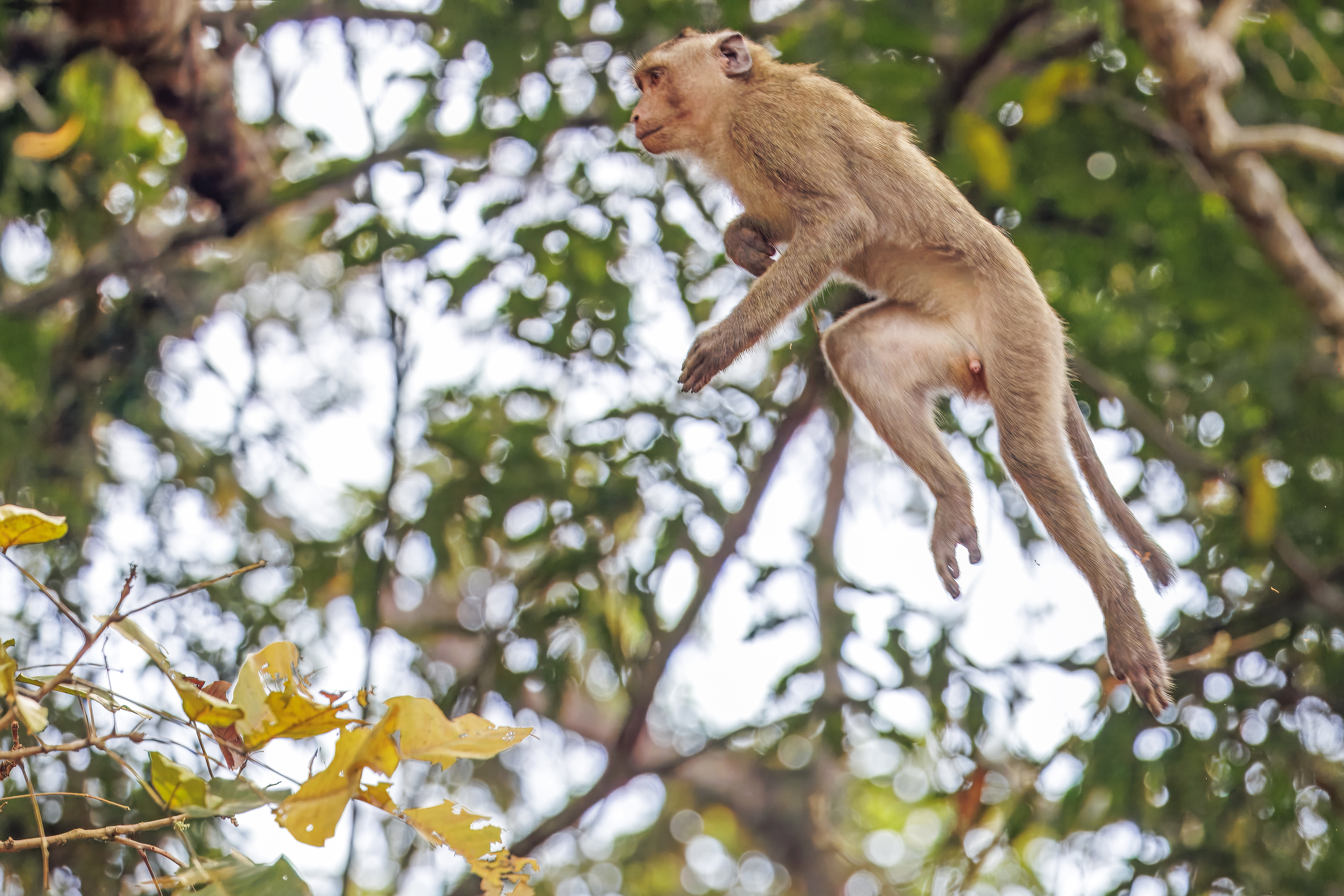
juvenile male jumping

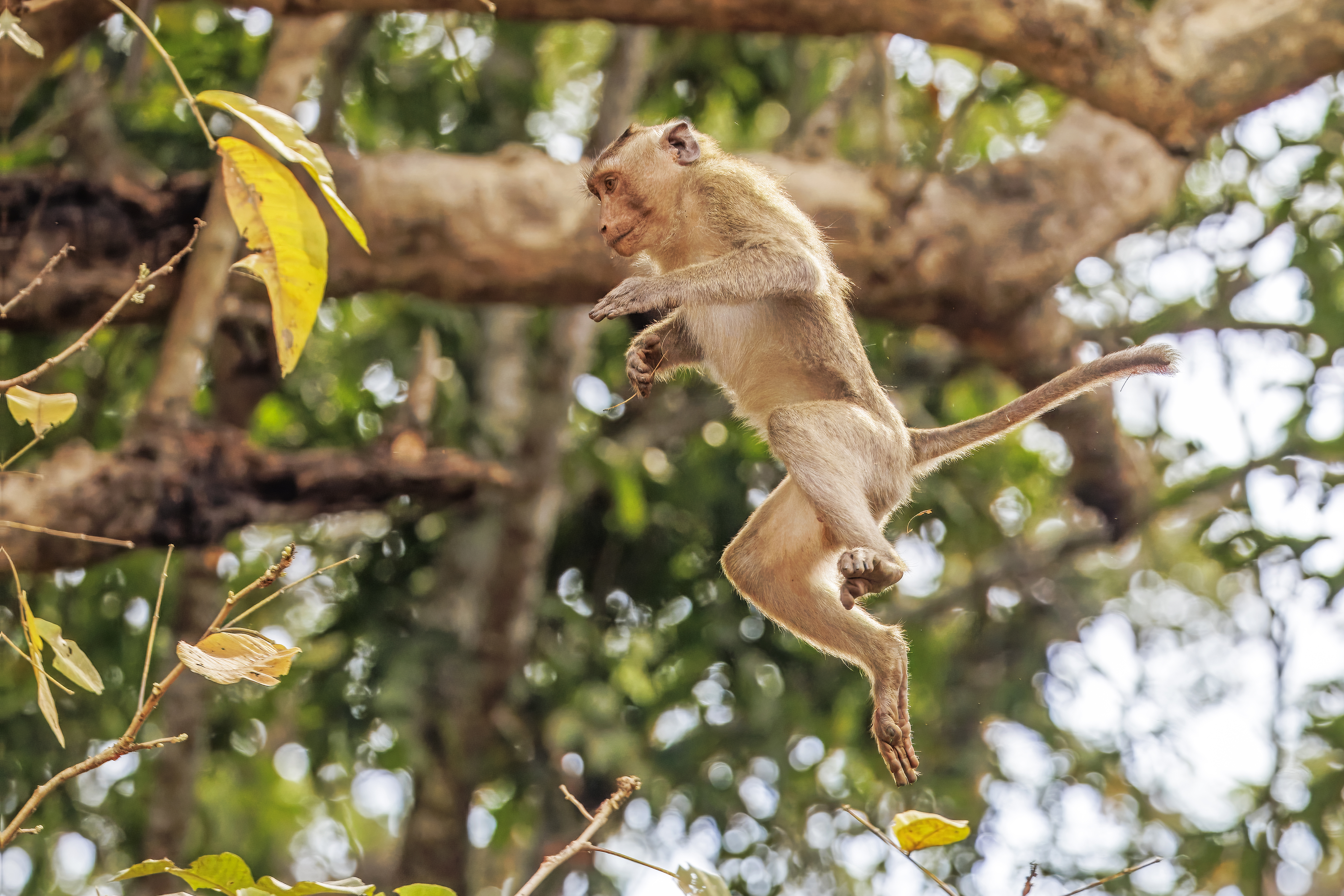
juvenile male jumping

== Threats ==
=== Viruses ===
Viruses are a common threat among northern pig-tailed macaques within degraded environments. For example, nonpathogenic human immunodeficiency virus type 1 (HIV-1NL4-3) and pathogenic simian immunodeficiency (SIVmac239) viruses present in northern pig-tailed macaques can determine their survival rates. These two viruses were evaluated by Wen-Quiag et al. (2022), to understand how interferon (IFN)-a had an impact on both viruses. The result of both infections were taken from tissue samples from either euthanized individuals with chronic infection or those who experienced natural death.

The researchers found that HIV-1 performed better, meaning that the infectious qualities and viral activity were less replicated within the immune system with (IFN)-a when compared to the pathogenic simian immunodeficiency virus. They hypothesized that HIV's lower impact on the immune system in northern pig-tailed macaques can explain how HIV-1 does not reproduce and evolve into AIDS within the species. The results show that naturally derived IFN-a is effective at preventing HIV-1 from further long term reproduction, yet SIVmac239 needs to be monitored to prevent further chronic illness. Northern pig-tailed macaques were also reported to be affected by coronavirus 2 (SARS-CoV-2) and was shown to be fatal and highly transmissible.

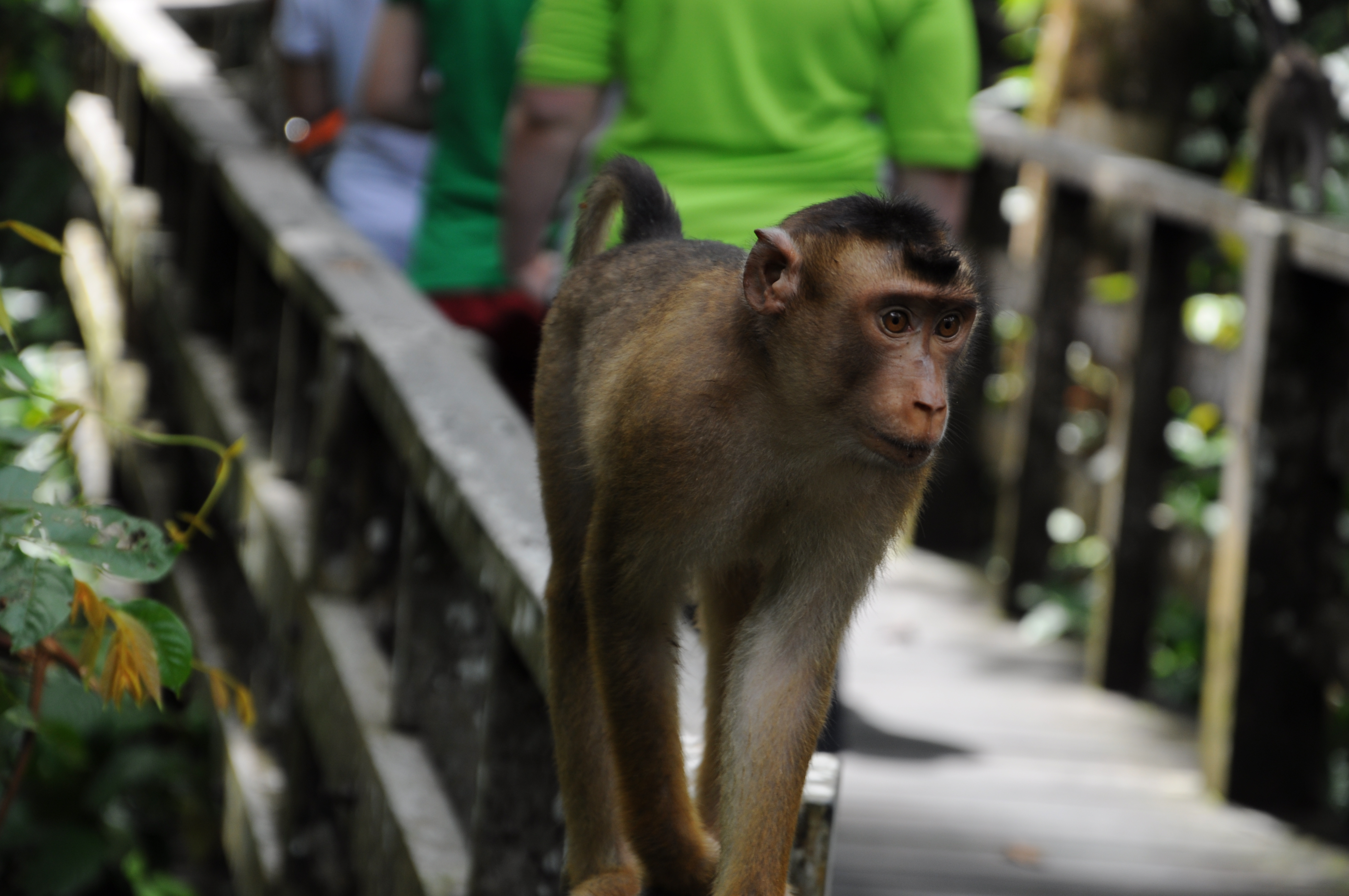
Northern pig-tailed macaque sharing the environment with humans

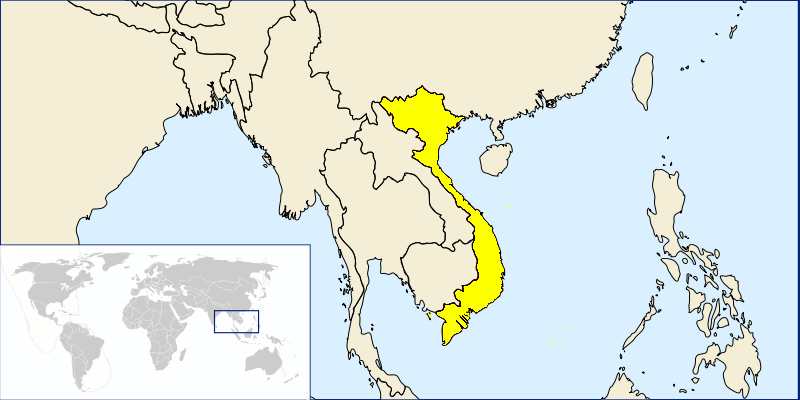
Vietnam

=== Human impacts ===
According to the ICUN red list, the northern pig-tailed macaque is considered vulnerable and declining. This species is affected by human impacts such as agricultural expansions, aquaculture, transportation infrastructure, hunting and logging for meat and trophies, and the illegal pet trade; that result in habitat loss and forest fragmentation. With these influences, this species is found raiding crops and their main sources of fresh nutrition are limited, minimally available, and less accessible depending on the season.

==== Pet trade ====
A study done between 2015 and 2019 in Vietnam, reported that the illegal pet trade of hundreds of primates were confiscated, released, and rescued and kept specific species at higher risk of physical and emotional threats. The study reported that "32 Assamese macaques (Macaca assamensis), 158 long-tailed macaques (Macaca fascicularis), 291 Northern pig-tailed macaques (Macaca leonina), 65 rhesus macaques (Macaca mulatta), and 110 stump-tailed macaques (Macaca arctoides)" were involved; showing that macaques are subject to the highest threats to pet trade in Vietnam. The rare distribution of illegal pet permits can be one consequence, however the widespread misinformation on keeping smaller non-human primates as pets was found to be the underlying reason for such trades. Macaques were also observed to be the least protected due to the misconception of their abundance and invasive qualities in human settlements. The psychological impacts vary, however the researchers evaluated common roots of the cause such as maternal deprivation and social isolation. In consequence, macaques were found to have "neophobia, persistent abnormal or stereotypical behaviors, anaclitic depression and withdrawal, negatively affect plasma-cortisol levels, cell-mediated immunity, and survivorship" (Aldrich & Neale, 2021).

Additionally, northern pig-tailed macaques were observed as the highest kept macaque out of the range of captive macaque species in Vietnam; and were found in various locations from cages on personal property to hotels and restaurants. Due to exposure from non-governmental organizations, this issue started to gain awareness among the public and authorities, yet rescue centres are often at full capacity; which continues the cycle of releasing macaques without proper identification, protection, and disease screening. The authors suggest data collection on the macaque species within Vietnam to address the severity of the pet trade on their survival and conservation, increasing the accessibility of confiscation and release records, training on confiscation and rehabilitation, and improving the global spread of information addressing the impacts of the pet trade on non-human primates survival and well-being.

== Gallery ==
Mother with infant in Khao Yai National Park, Thailand

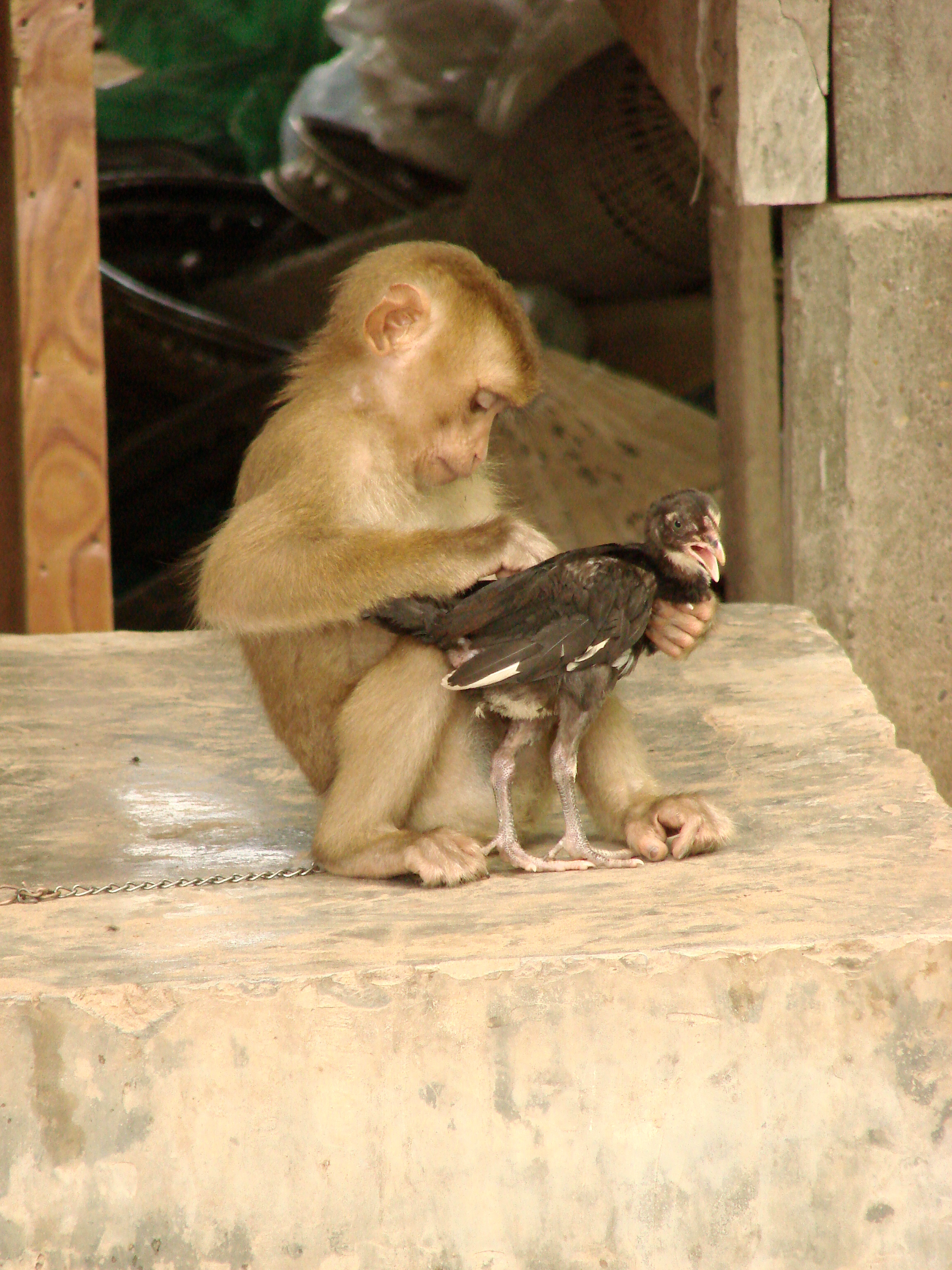
Pet juvenile grooming household chicken on Khong Island, Laos

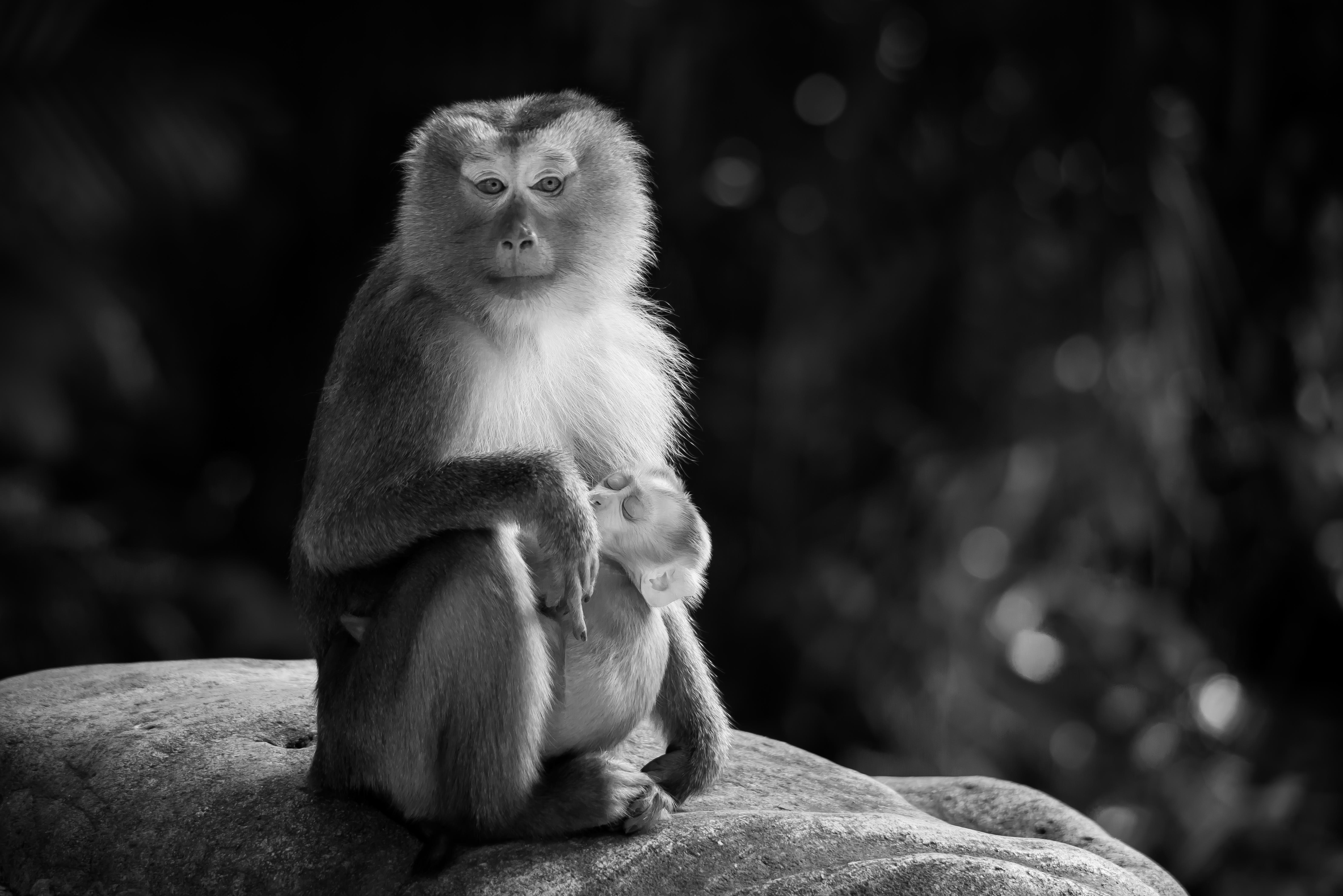
Female and an infant breastfeeding

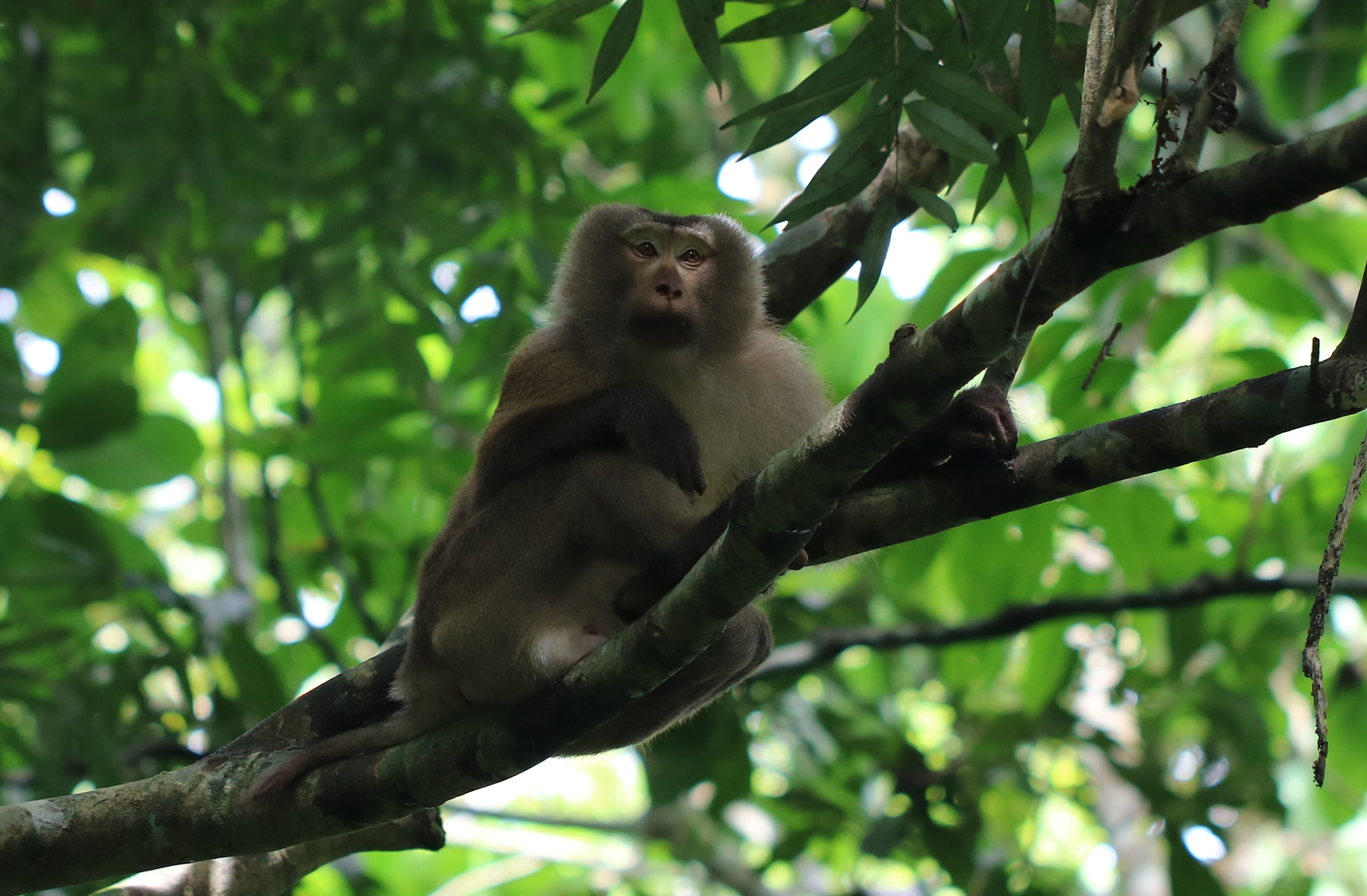
A northern pig-tailed macaque at Hoollongapar Gibbon Sanctuary, India
