= Weight and height percentile =

Relative height and weight of children

Weight and height percentiles are determined by growth charts and body mass index charts to compare a child's measurements with those of other children in the same age group. By doing this, doctors can track a child's growth over time and monitor how a child is growing in relation to other children. There are different charts for boys and girls because their growth rates and patterns differ. For both boys and girls there are two sets of charts: one for infants ages 0 to 36 months and another for ages 2 and above. Children with failure to thrive usually have a weight that is below the 3rd or 5th percentile for their age and a declining growth velocity (meaning they are not gaining weight as expected).

Recently it has come to light that current growth charts for infants under 24 months overstate the expected weight of babies and lead to potentially obese children. This is because the original charts produced in 1977 were based on samples of middle-class white American babies on high-protein bottle-fed diets in Ohio. The World Health Organization has altered these targets in 2006 to represent a more healthy weight.
