= Growth chart =

Graphic of child development over time

Sample growth chart for use with American boys from birth to age 36 months.

A growth chart is used by pediatricians and other health care providers to follow a child's growth with age. Growth charts have been constructed by observing the growth of large numbers of healthy children over time. The height, The body weight, and head circumference of a child can be compared to the expected parameters of children of the same age and sex to determine whether the child is growing appropriately. For each parameter, a set of growth curves are graphed for the median value (the "middle" value, at 50 percentile), lower and upper quartiles (bottom and top 25%), as well the lower and upper deciles (bottom and top 10%).

Growth charts can also be used to predict the expected adult height and weight of a child because, in general, children maintain a fairly constant growth curve. When a child deviates from his or her previously established growth curve, investigation into the cause is generally warranted. Parameters used to analyze growth charts include weight velocity (defined as rate of change in weight over time), height velocity (defined as rate of change in stature over time), and whether someone's growth chart crosses percentiles. For example, endocrine disorders can be associated with a decrease in height velocity and preserved weight velocity while normal growth variants are associated with a decrease in height and weight velocity that are proportional to each other. Other parameters are more commonly used such as waist circumference for assessing obesity and skin fold difference for assessing malnutrition. Growth charts can also be compiled with a portion of the population deemed to have been raised in more or less ideal environments, such as nutrition that conforms to pediatric guidelines, and no maternal smoking. Charts from these sources end up with slightly taller but thinner averages.

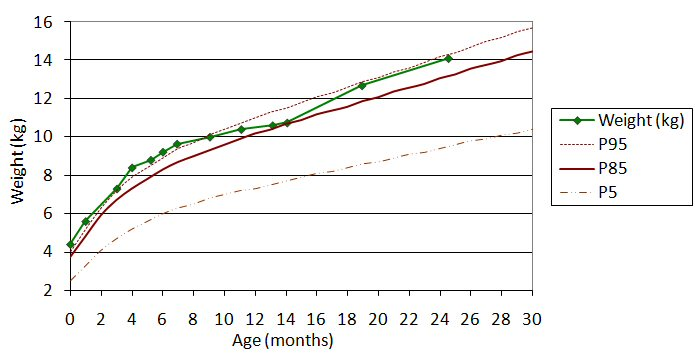
Growth curve of a girl, compared to the 2006 WHO curves

Growth charts are different for boys and girls, due in part to pubertal differences and disparity in final adult height. In addition, children born prematurely and children with chromosomal abnormalities such as Down syndrome and Turner syndrome follow distinct growth curves which deviate significantly from children without these conditions. As such, growth charts have been created to describe the expected growth patterns of several developmental conditions. Since there are differences in normal growth rates between breastfed and formula-fed babies, the World Health Organization growth charts, which better reflect the growth pattern of the healthy, breastfed infant, are considered the standard for U.S. children under age two.

== History and revisions to growth charts ==
The history of growth charts dates back to the 19th century. Regarding growth velocity, in 1829, Louis-René Villermé found that slower growth velocity could be attributed, in part, to poverty. In 1870, Adolphe Quetelet noted that there were periods of more or less rapid growth, in particular around the age of puberty and following illnesses. Other historical contributors to the study of child growth include Edwin Chadwick, Charles Roberts (d. 1901), Henry Pickering Bowditch and Franz Boas.

In 1977, the National Center for Health Statistics (NCHS) developed a growth chart to clinically analyze child development. This growth chart was subsequently used by the World Health Organization for dissemination to healthcare systems abroad. However, there were limitations to this growth chart. First, the sample population was restricted to children of European ancestry from a single community in the United States. Second, while it did use a longitudinal study design, the focal children were only measured every three months, which did not sufficiently describe the rapid and changing rate of growth in early infancy. Third, the statistical methods available at the time resulted in inappropriate modelling of the pattern and variability of child growth, especially in early infancy.

Acting on this, in the 1990s the World Health Organization set out to create more representative growth references. In the WHO Multicentre Growth Reference Study, between July 1997 and December 2003, longitudinal and cross-sectional growth data were collected from 8440 breastfed children, from six countries (USA, Oman, Norway, Brazil, Ghana, India) in socio-economic conditions favourable to growth. These data included anthropometrics, as well as motor development, feeding practices, child morbidity, perinatal factors, and socio-economic, demographic and environmental characteristics. It is against these growth references that the United Nations Sustainable Development Goals are measured.

The use of one growth reference for all children is appropriate. Children included in the WHO Multicentre Growth Reference Study were ethnically and geographically diverse. Height is a highly heritable trait; about 80% of the variation in height is attributable to variation in genes. At the same time, it has long been known that genetic variation within racial groups exceeds variation between groups (see The Apportionment of Human Diversity). Unsurprisingly, in the WHO Multicentre Growth Study, only three percent of the variation in height was attributed to variation between sites, while 70% of the variation was attributed to variation within sites.

In addition to international growth references, some countries choose to use their own growth references. For example, in the United States, data used to calculate the CDC's growth chart percentiles was accumulated periodically since the 1960s by the National Health and Nutrition Examination Survey. Updated and more comprehensive data was later used to revise the existing growth chart and construct the 2000 CDC growth charts. The revised growth charts include revision of the 14 existing charts as well as introduction of 2 new BMI-for-age charts.

== Quantitative definitions ==
Mid-parental height ('MPH') is often used to predict the target height of an individual based on the heights of the two biological parents. It can be used to calculate the target height ('TH') for children. MPH is given as simply the mathematical average of the heights of the child's parents:
$$\mathrm{MPH} = \frac{height_\mathrm{mother} + height_\mathrm{father}}{2}.$$
MPH is unisex; however, boys need an upward correction, while girls need a downward correction. In view of an average height difference between adult men and women of 13 cm (5.1 in), TH is usually given as
$$\begin{align}
\mathrm{TH_{boys}} &= \mathrm{MPH} + {1\over2}(13\text{ cm } [5.1\text{ in}]) \\
&= {1\over2}\left(height_\mathrm{mother} + height_\mathrm{father} + 13\text{ cm } [5.1\text{ in}]\right) \\
\mathrm{TH_{girls}} &= \mathrm{MPH} - {1\over2}(13\text{ cm } [5.1\text{ in}]) \\
&= {1\over2}\left(height_\mathrm{mother} + height_\mathrm{father} - 13\text{ cm } [5.1\text{ in}]\right) \\
\end{align}$$

Alternatively, TH can be expressed in standard deviation scores (SDS), where the target height (SDS), TH_{SDS}, is the average of the mother's height SDS and the father's height SDS. However, this calculation is incorrect as it needs adjustment to mid-population height. It is suggested to use the conditional target height or cTH_SDS with a correction factor of 0.72:
$$\begin{align}
\mathrm{cTH_{SDS}} &= \mathrm{TH_{SDS}} \times 0.72 \\
&= \frac{height_\mathrm{mother,SDS} + height_\mathrm{father,SDS}}{2} \times 0.72
\end{align}$$

Velocity (Note: Technically speaking, despite the term growth "velocity", growth "speed" is what is really being discussed here.) (of growth) is another quantity that is used to quantify growth curves. It can be used for both height and weight. In the equation provided q is either weight or height, t represents time, and Δ represents change over a defined interval. Growth velocity is defined as follows:
$$velocity = {\Delta q \over \Delta t}.$$

Despite certain limitations, body mass index (BMI) is still a useful quantification when used for statistical analysis that can gauge level of obesity. It is defined as follows with the given clinical ranges.
$$BMI = \frac{weight\text{ [kg]}}{\left(height\text{ [m]}\right)^2}$$

- Obesity: BMI > 95th percentile
- Overweight: 85th < BMI < 95th percentile
- Underweight: BMI < 5th percentile

Bone age is a metric that complements a physician's use of a growth chart.

== Common variants of normal growth ==
- Familial short stature: Benign variant of normal height growth. Expect a normal bone age and a trajectory that is on track for the target height.
- Constitutional growth delay: Benign variant of normal height growth due to a delay in the onset of puberty. Expect a delayed bone age and a trajectory that is not on track for the target height.
- Endocrine disorders: Pathologic variant of normal growth due to hormonal abnormality. Expect a delayed height trajectory accompanied by a gain of weight.

== Clinical significance ==
The combination of height and weight velocity can indicate underlying disease of genetic origin, endocrine cause, and/or delayed growth.

=== Normal growth deficiency ===
One of the most common growth disorders, a growth deficiency can be due to either familial short stature or constitutional growth delay (CGD). Familial short stature is indicative when one or both parents are of a short stature, and the height and weight percentiles are under the 5 percentile threshold. The child will be concordant with the mean parental height, and the bone age should be normal. Constitutional growth delays are marked by low height and weight percentiles as early as the first 4–6 months following birth.

=== Genetic syndromes ===
A variety of genetic syndromes can result growth chart patterns with a typical pattern. Genetic diseases such as Turner's syndrome, Prader Willi, and Noonan syndrome can be marked by a less than 5th percentile height and weight since birth. Other genetic disorders such as Marfan's syndrome and Klinefelter's syndrome are typically indicated by a height above the 90th percentile.

=== Endocrine and metabolic disorders ===
A decrease of height velocity with retained or increased weight velocity can be indicative of endocrine disorders including hypothyroidism, growth hormone deficiency, and excess of glucocorticoids.

== Variability in growth charts ==
The CDC's growth chart is utilized from a population that consists of a representative population in the USA. Charts based on a specific race or ethnicity are not useful because of the growth chart progression can be attributed to socioeconomic factors. WHO launched a revised growth in 2006 chart using children from Ghana, Oman, Norway, Brazil, India and the USA that substantiated the fact that growth is highly dependent on environmental factors.

== How to Recognize Growth Spurts in Toddlers and Kids ==
Growth spurts in children can be identified through the following observable indicators:

=== More Sleeping ===
Children may need significantly more sleep during growth spurts as their bodies work hard to grow and develop.

=== Increased Appetite ===
Your child may eat more than usual as their body requires extra nutrition to support rapid growth.

=== Suddenly Too-Small Clothes ===
Clothes and shoes that fit well last month may suddenly become too tight or short.

=== New Baby Teeth or Loose Teeth ===
Children may experience dental changes as part of their overall growth and development.

== See also ==
- Failure to thrive, a growth disorder
- Weight and height percentile
- Endocrine disease
- Constitutional growth delay
- Growth hormone deficiency
- Intrauterine growth restriction
- Obesity
