= John Macmurray =

Scottish philosopher (1891–1976)

John Macmurray MC
- Born: 16 February 1891; Maxwelltown, Scotland
- Died: 21 June 1976 (aged 85); Edinburgh, Scotland
- Website: johnmacmurray.org

John Macmurray MC (16 February 1891 – 21 June 1976) was a Scottish philosopher. His thought both moved beyond and was critical of the modern tradition, whether rationalist or empiricist. His thought may be classified as personalist, as his writings focused primarily on the nature of human beings. He viewed persons in terms of their relationality and agency, rather than the modern tendency to characterize them in terms of individualism and cognition.

He made contributions in the fields of political science, religion, education, and philosophy in a long career of writing, teaching, and public speaking. After retirement he became a Quaker.

== Life ==
Macmurray was born on 16 February 1891 in Maxwelltown in Kirkcudbrightshire, Scotland, into a strict Presbyterian family. His father was employed by the Inland Revenue Department as an excise officer. In 1899 the family moved to Aberdeen, where the young Macmurray attended Aberdeen Grammar School (1903 to 1905) and Robert Gordon's College (1905 to 1909). He was educated at the University of Glasgow, earning First-class honours in Classics and was awarded a Snell Exhibition to attend Balliol College, Oxford in 1913. His tutor at Balliol was A. D. Lindsay.

When war with Germany was declared in 1914, Macmurray enlisted in the Royal Army Medical Corps. In August 1915 he was sent to France with the 58th Field Ambulance as part of the 19th (Western) Division of the British Expeditionary Force. In June 1916 he was awarded a commission as Second Lieutenant in the Queen's Own Cameron Highlanders and was sent to the Battle of the Somme. Macmurray married Elizabeth Hyde Campbell in London during a three-day leave in October 1916. He was seriously wounded in battle near Arras on 28 March 1918 and was awarded the Military Cross for gallantry.

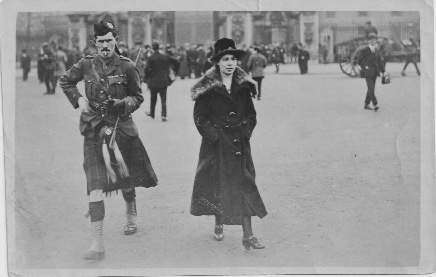
John Macmurray with his sister at Buckingham Palace after receiving his Military Cross, 1918

While on leave recovering from a broken ankle in 1917, Macmurray was invited to give a sermon in an unidentified North London church. He preached on the importance of preparing for post-war reconciliation with the enemy rather than exacting vengeance. The sermon was coldly received by the congregation and Macmurray saw their reaction as indicating a lack of true Christianity in the institutional churches. Because of this experience, Macmurray determined not to be a member of any church, while continuing to maintain his strong Christian convictions.

After the war, Macmurray completed his studies at Balliol, obtaining a distinction in the Shortened Honours Course of Literae Humaniores in 1919, as well as winning in the John Locke Scholarship in Mental Philosophy in the same year. He worked as a Lecturer in Philosophy at the University of Manchester from 1919 to 1920, followed by two years as Chair of Philosophy at the University of the Witwatersrand in South Africa. In 1922 he returned to Balliol as a Fellow and Tutor, succeeding his former tutor A.D. Lindsay as Jowett Lecturer in Philosophy. He left Oxford to become Grote Professor of Mind and Logic at University College London, the position he held from 1928 to 1944. He then moved to the University of Edinburgh, where he held the Chair of Moral Philosophy until his retirement in 1958.

Macmurray and his wife had no children. After his retirement, they moved to the village of Jordans, Buckinghamshire, where they both joined the Society of Friends. In 1970 they returned to Edinburgh, where Macmurray died on 21 June 1976.

== Philosophy ==
The main themes in Macmurray's philosophy are the primacy in human life of action over theory, and the essentially relational nature of human beings. These themes are the basis for his Gifford Lectures delivered in 1953 and 1954 at the University of Glasgow, and entitled The Self as Agent and Persons in Relation respectively. The overall title given to the two lecture series was The Form of the Personal. Macmurray summed up his philosophy in the introduction to The Self as Agent: "The simplest expression that I can find for the thesis I have tried to maintain is this: All meaningful knowledge is for the sake of action, and all meaningful action for the sake of friendship".

Macmurray rejected mind–body dualism and argued that the nature of human beings is personal, rather than mechanical or organic. He argued for the importance of emotion as motivating action, and looked to infancy and early childhood for evidence of the universal desire for relationship. He distinguished between society and community, with society being for organizations to achieve particular purposes, while community is an end in itself.

In dismissing the Cogito and its legacy of the primacy of thought over action, Macmurray saw himself as breaking with the western philosophical tradition. However, he acknowledged the influence of Kant and Marx on his thinking, along with Christianity. On the other hand, he had no sympathy for, and did not engage with, the type of academic philosophy that was dominant during the latter part of his career.

== Broadcasting and other work ==
His friendship with the educator Kenneth C. Barnes resulted in his becoming a governor of Wennington School.

He was well known in Britain before World War II for his BBC radio broadcasts on philosophy, some of which were published in his first book, Freedom in the Modern World (1932).

== Influence ==
Macmurray's work has been largely neglected in academic philosophy. However, he has been influential in other fields, including theology and psychology. The twenty first century has seen the publication of the first full-length biography and a book-length critical study of his religious philosophy, as well as volumes of selections from his works and books and articles about his work. Tony Blair contributed the foreword to one of the anthologies, in which he described Macmurray's philosophy as "immensely modern... in the sense that he confronted what will be the critical political question of the twenty-first century: the relationship between individual and society".

== Books ==
- Freedom in the Modern World. London: Faber & Faber. 1932.
- Interpreting the Universe. London: Faber & Faber. 1933.
- The Philosophy of Communism. London: Faber & Faber. 1933.
- Creative Society: A Study of the Relation of Christianity to Communism. London: SCM Press. 1935.
- Reason and Emotion. London: Faber & Faber. 1935.
- The Structure of Religious Experience. London: Faber & Faber. 1936.
- The Clue to History. London: SCM Press. 1938.
- The Boundaries of Science: A Study in the Philosophy of Psychology. London: Faber & Faber. 1939. Fulltext at The Internet Archive
- A Challenge to the Churches: Religion and Democracy. London: Kegan Paul. 1941.
- Constructive Democracy: Two Lectures Delivered at University College London in December 1942. London: Faber & Faber. 1943.
- The Conditions of Freedom. Toronto: Ryerson Press. 1949.
- The Self as Agent. London: Faber & Faber. 1957. Fulltext at The Gifford Lectures Online
- Persons in Relation. London: Faber & Faber. 1961. Fulltext at The Gifford Lectures Online
- Religion, Art, and Science: A Study of the Reflective Activities in Man. Liverpool: Liverpool University Press. 1961.
- Search for Reality in Religion: The Swarthmore Lecture 1965. London: George Allen & Unwin. 1965.

== See also ==
- Ian Dishart Suttie
