= Ian Dishart Suttie =

Scottish psychiatrist (1889–1935)

Ian Dishart Suttie (1889–1935) was a Scottish psychiatrist perhaps best known for his writings on the taboo in families on expressing tenderness.

His influential book The Origins of Love and Hate was posthumously published in 1935.

== Life and career ==
The third son of a Glasgow medical doctor, Suttie took his medical degree there before joining the staff of the Glasgow Royal Asylum, where he married his wife (and future co-author) Dr. Jane Robertson. He continued to work in Scotland until 1928, when he moved south to join the Tavistock Clinic.

Suttie had served with the RAMC in Mesopotamia in 1918, where he became interested in the anthropology of the mother child bond – an interest confirmed by the influence of Sandor Ferenczi. His writings reveal an ongoing debate with Freud – whose concept of the death drive he rejected as unscientific – over the importance of companionship as against sex in the mother-child relationship: a theme (tinged with Christian thinking) which was to influence the thinking of W. R. D. Fairbairn, and anticipate the work of D. W. Winnicott and John Bowlby. He developed the theme in a series of papers (with his wife) published between 1922 and 1931, which he would subsequently draw upon for his (posthumous) book of 1935.

== Criticism ==
Continental critics see Suttie's work as reflecting a very British complacency about sexuality, and a downplaying of its problematics.

== Work ==
- Suttie, I. D. (1988). The Origins of Love and Hate. London: Free Association Books.

Bibliography in pages xli-xlii.

== See also ==
- Attachment theory
- A. S. Neill
- J. A. Hadfield
- John Macmurray
- Maternal deprivation
- Matriarchy
