= Midparent =

In human genetics the midparent value of a trait is defined as the average of the trait value of the father and a scaled version of that of the mother. This value can be used in a study to analyze the data set without heeding sex effects. Studying quantitative traits in heritability studies may be complicated by sex differences observed for the trait.

Well-known examples include studies of humans' height, whose midparent value h_{mp} is given by:

$$h_{mp}=\frac{h_f+(1.08\times h_m)}{2}$$

where h_{f} is the father's height, and h_{m} the mother's.

The coefficient 1.08 serves as a scaling factor. After the 1.08 scaling, the mean of the mother's height is the same as that of the father's, and the variance is closer to the father's; in this way, sex difference can be ignored.
