= René Spitz =

Austrian-American psychoanalyst

- Born: René Árpád Spitz; January 29, 1887; Vienna, Austria-Hungary
- Died: September 14, 1974 (aged 87); Denver, Colorado, U.S.
- Occupation: Psychoanalyst

René Árpád Spitz (German: [ʃpɪts]; January 29, 1887 – September 14, 1974) was an Austrian-American psychoanalyst. He is best known for his analysis of hospitalized infants in which he found links between marasmus and death with unmothered infants. Spitz also made significant contributions to the school of ego psychology.

== Biography ==
René Spitz was born in Vienna, the capital of the Austro-Hungarian Empire. From a wealthy Jewish family background, he spent most of his childhood in Hungary. After finishing his medical studies in 1910, Spitz discovered the work of Sigmund Freud. In 1932, he left Austria and settled in Paris for the next six years, where he taught psychoanalysis at the École Normale Supérieure. In 1939, he emigrated to the United States, and worked as a psychiatrist at the Mount Sinai hospital. From 1940 to 1943, Spitz served as a visiting professor at several universities, before teaching at the University of Denver and eventually settling in Colorado.

Spitz based his observations and experiments on psychoanalytic findings in the style developed by Freud. Where Freud performed his famed psychoanalytic studies on adult subjects, Spitz performed his empirical research on infants.

In 1935, Spitz began research in the area of child development. He was one of the first researchers who used direct observation of children as an experimental method, studying both healthy and unhealthy subjects. His most significant contributions to the field of psychoanalysis came from his studies of the effects of maternal and emotional deprivation on infants.

Spitz valued several aspects: Infant observation and assessment, anaclitic depression (hospitalism), developmental transitions, the processes of effective communication, and understanding developmental complexity.

Spitz coined the term "anaclitic depression" to refer to partial emotional deprivation (the loss of a loved object). When the loved object is returned to the child within a period of three to five months, recovery is prompt. If one deprives a child longer than five months, they will show the symptoms of increasingly serious deterioration. He called this total deprivation "hospitalism."

In 1945, Spitz investigated hospitalism in children in orphanages and foundling hospitals in South America. He found that the developmental imbalance caused by the unfavorable environmental conditions during the children's first year produces irreparable psychosomatic damage to normal infants. His observations recorded the precipitous decline in intelligence a year after three-month-old infants were abandoned by their mothers. The experiences of the infants in these institutions were captured in a black-and-white documentary called Grief: A Peril in Infancy (1947). Another study of Spitz's showed that under favorable circumstances and adequate organization, a positive child development can be achieved. He stated that the methods in foundling homes should, therefore, be carefully evaluated. However, he still maintained in a comparison between orphanages and nursing homes that even if the former provided good food, hygienic living space, and medical care, the children raised in the former were more susceptible to infections and had higher death rate than the latter due to social deprivation.

Spitz recorded his research on film. The film Psychogenic Disease in Infancy (1952) shows the effects of emotional and maternal deprivation on attachment.

== Ego development ==
Spitz noted three organizing principles in the psychological development of the child:

Firstly, the smiling response, which appears at around three months old in the presence of an unspecified person

Secondly, the anxiety in the presence of a stranger, around the eighth month

Thirdly, semantic communication, in which the child learns how to be obstinate, which the psychoanalysts connect to the obsessional neurosis.

== Publications ==
=== Books ===
- Spitz, R.A. (1957). No and yes : on the genesis of human communication. New York : International Universities Press.
- Spitz, R.A. (1965). The first year of life : a psychoanalytic study of normal and deviant development of object relations. New York : International Universities Press.

=== Articles ===
- Spitz, R.A. (1945). Hospitalism—An Inquiry Into the Genesis of Psychiatric Conditions in Early Childhood. Psychoanalytic Study of the Child, 1, 53–74.
- Spitz, R.A. (1951). The Psychogenic Diseases in Infancy—An Attempt at their Etiologic Classification. Psychoanalytic Study of the Child, 6, 255–275.
- Spitz, R.A. (1964). The derailment of dialogue: Stimulus overload, action cycles, and the completion gradient. Journal-of-the-American-Psychoanalytic-Association, 12, 752–774.

== See also ==
- James Robertson, British psychoanalyst who worked alongside John Bowlby at the Tavistock Clinic in London to study the emotional trauma experienced by young children separated from their mothers during brief hospitalizations.
