= Hospitalism =

Diagnosis used in the 1930s to describe infants who wasted away while in hospital

Hospitalism (or anaclitic depression in its sublethal form) was a pediatric diagnosis used in the 1930s to describe infants who wasted away while in a hospital. The symptoms could include decreased physical development and disruption of perceptual-motor skills and language. In the first half of the 20th century, hospitalism was discovered to be linked to social deprivation between an infant and its caregiver. The term was in use in 1945, but the term can be traced back as early as 1897.

It appears under adjustment disorders at F43.2, in the World Health Organization's classification of diseases, ICD-10.

== History ==
In 1945, the psychoanalyst René Spitz published an article in which he explained how deprivation of social interactions can lead to a condition named "hospitalism" in infants. According to Spitz, young children who are cared for in institutions can suffer from severe impairment in their development because they are not provided with sufficient maternal care. Spitz did not coin the term "hospitalism," which can be traced back to the end of the 19th century. In 1897 Floyd M. Crandall published an article in Archive of Pediatrics in which he used the term to describe a condition in institutionalized infants characterized by loss of weight, susceptibility to various diseases, and ultimately death. According to Crandall, this high mortality rate of institutionalized children under one-year-old was suspected to be caused by a lack of hygiene, food, air, exercise and personal contact.

After rapid growth in welfare centres for infants at the beginning of the 20th century, hospitalism became a more public concern. One solution that was offered was the improvement of general hygiene to avoid the spread of infections. Breastfeeding became increasingly important since it was considered to provide sufficient nutrition and to improve the infants' immune systems, which helped to reduce the mortality rate. The assumption that infants had no social competence or dependence on personal interactions had developed. Nurses began to replace the mothers' role for institutionalized infants, and mothers were usually not allowed to visit their children more than once a week. This was supposed to minimize the risk of infections and was considered to be a solution to hospitalism. The pediatrician Meinhard von Pfaundler criticized this approach and argued that this rational and distant care would damage the infants' physical and emotional well-being. He claimed that children needed more external stimulation than was provided in the environment of hospitals.

In the early 1930s researchers at the Vienna Psychological Institute started to concentrate on the development of infants. The so-called Viennese Baby Tests were created by Charlotte Bühler and could be used to assess the mental, social, and physical development of children. Katherine Wolf and Hildegard Durfee used these tests to conduct studies on infants in different institutions. They concluded that the environment influenced the development of children and that this was especially important for the development of social competence. According to them, infants needed to be in contact with their mothers to receive sufficient love and care for their development. In the 1940s, the idea that infections led to hospitalism was increasingly criticized, especially since hospitalized infants were often kept alone in small cubicles, without any contact with caregivers or external stimuli, to prevent cross-infections.

In 1945 the psychoanalyst René Spitz redefined the term hospitalism by arguing that the mortality rate of infants was still high, despite the isolation in cubicles, because the lack of maternal care impaired their development. Spitz conducted research for his hypothesis by comparing infants in a foundling hospital in Mexico and in a prison nursery in New York City with two control groups of children growing up with their families. With the help of Katherine Wolf, he assessed the development of the infants using the Viennese Baby Tests. Spitz concluded that the decline in development and the high susceptibility to diseases he discovered in institutionalized babies were not due to a lack of environmental stimuli, since the prison nursery infants actually had access to toys, but mostly due to emotional and social deprivation. According to Spitz, a stable and intimate mother-child relationship is critical for the healthy development of the child. In his short film Grief: A Peril in Infancy, he demonstrated the consequences of hospitalism. This idea had a strong influence on other researchers, and in 1951, the British psychoanalyst John Bowlby published a report on homeless children in the US. This report, which was titled Maternal Care and Mental Health, was commissioned by the WHO and supported his theory of maternal deprivation. According to Bowlby, a child needs to have a loving and continuous relationship with the mother to avoid permanent developmental damage and hospitalism.

== Causes ==
Three conditions determine the likelihood of hospitalism in a patient:

- How healthy the person is before the admission into the hospital
- The efficacy of the operation or appointment
- How the patient is taken care of after the operation or appointment, including the number of patients in the hospital in general and the hygiene of the hospital

The most investigated causes which have been observed are those from infants and children in hospitals or nursery homes. The main cause of hospitalism in children and infants is the separation of the child from the mother. They experience a massive desperation and distress due to the isolation from their mother. An example is children or infants in a nursery home when they are only held in cribs, depriving them of the opportunity to interact with their environment and other people. This deprivation might happen since the nurse has to take care of multiple children at once. Many alleged cause are yet to be scientifically investigated.

== Symptoms ==
Symptoms of hospitalism are numerous. Symptoms are largely observable in behaviour, but a patient's psychological or physical impairments are largely driven by the cause of their condition, and as such not all patients experience the same suite of problems. Physical impairments include physical underdevelopment, reduced motor speed, and increased risk of rapid-onset muscle atrophy. Patients commonly suffer from maladaptive or disruptive eating behaviour, which results in a general decrease in stamina. This has been linked to malnutrition, extreme weight loss, and food addiction. Patients tend to have a strong predisposition to marasmus, which increases mental and physical fragility, alongside an impairment of their immune system, leading them to be at higher risk for infections and viral diseases. Infants also experience a higher mortality rate. The psychological circumstances fit this image. Especially in children that stayed in orphanages for a long time and suffer from deprivation syndrome – the sensory withdrawal before adulthood resulting in physical and psychological damages – one can observe a reduction of activities due to a lack of motivation and suppression of feelings. Sleeplessness, loss of weight and apathy are additional symptoms of depression that can also play a role. Another effect of withdrawal of sensory desires in an early age are personality disorders as for example borderline and attachment and adjustment disorders that are especially seen in behavioral abnormalities.

These abnormalities can consist of stereotypes – a motor restlessness that results in showing repetitive and consistent motor processes and spoken utterances that do not have any goal or function and occur in absolutely unfitting situations. Stereotypic movement might also result in self harm. Behavioral abnormalities can also hinder social relations effectively. Affected individuals tend to become apathetic and withdrawn. Antisocial behavior might manifest as lying or stealing. Disrupted social functions related to a lack of socialization and integration can lead to further isolation. Hygiene and appearance may also be negatively impacted.

=== Consequences and complication ===
The consequences of hospitalism can be detrimental for the people affected and reveal themselves in different ways. The symptoms can vary across different individuals, and several factors, such as age, play a significant role.

Individuals suffering from hospitalism are at risk for sensory perception problems:

- altered or delayed pain perception
- fear of touch
- hypersensitivity

Other common consequences relate to cognitive disorders, such as:

- learning disabilities
- rarely memory lapses or even loss of long- or short-term memory
- motor disorders such as monotonous and stereotyped movements (for example, banging the head against the wall) or a severely reduced ability to react

Long-term consequences, which is causally related to traumatic experiences, can be expressed in different ways. People showing signs of hospitalism might express an extreme aversion towards showing or accepting emotional or physical affection, effectively shutting themselves off from others. A different response could be promiscuity, whereas people strive for love and affection.

== Prevention and solutions ==
Prevention and solutions of hospitalism largely focuses on efforts that seek to counter-act deprivation. During their stay, skin-to-skin contact between mother and child has shown to be beneficial. Also, conducting various types of play activities with children, which will meet their need for physical activity, can provide an opportunity to establish an intimate emotional relationship with the mother or a substitute. Therapeutic interventions should be carried out by specially trained professionals, psychotherapists, psychologists, social workers, teachers, and a network of non-professionals for people who are physically, mentally, or emotionally handicapped. Efforts are made to place parentless children in suitable accommodations, such as children's villages and foster care. Special attention should focus on the suitability of the environment for the child. These institutions should provide the necessary support and the right environment so that children can develop normally.

For the care of elderly and sick people assisted living and community houses are used for prevention. Accessibility and affordability are to continuously be improved. High-quality accommodation is also important for the proper treatment of existing illnesses and disorders. A very unique approach is lived in the Belgium city Geel, where it is common for people with mental illnesses to live with local families.

== See also ==
- Failure to thrive
- Attachment theory
- Maternal deprivation
- Stress-related disorders
- Philosophy of dialogue
- Orphan
- Feral child
- Infant cognitive development
