= Failure to thrive =

Insufficient growth or weight gain in children

- Other names: Faltering weight, weight faltering
- Standard growth chart for boys age 0-36 months
- Specialty: Pediatrics

Failure to thrive (FTT), also known as weight faltering or faltering growth, indicates insufficient weight gain or absence of appropriate physical growth in children. FTT is usually defined in terms of weight, and can be evaluated either by a low weight for the child's age, or by a low rate of increase in the weight.

The term "failure to thrive" has been used in different ways, as no single objective standard or universally accepted definition exists for when to diagnose FTT. One definition describes FTT as a fall in one or more weight centile spaces on a World Health Organization (WHO) growth chart depending on birth weight or when weight is below the 2nd percentile of weight for age irrespective of birth weight. Another definition of FTT is a weight for age that is consistently below the fifth percentile or weight for age that falls by at least two major percentile lines on a growth chart. While weight loss after birth is normal and most babies return to their birth weight by three weeks of age, clinical assessment for FTT is recommended for babies who lose more than 10% of their birth weight or do not return to their birth weight after three weeks. Failure to thrive is not a specific disease, but a sign of inadequate weight gain.

In veterinary medicine, FTT is also referred to as ill-thrift.

== Signs and symptoms ==
Failure to thrive is most commonly diagnosed before two years of age, when growth rates are highest, though it can present among children and adolescents of any age. Caretakers may express concern about poor weight gain or smaller size compared to peers of a similar age. Physicians often identify FTT during routine office visits, when a child's growth parameters such as height and weight are not increasing appropriately on growth curves. When a child falls two or more standard deviations below the median weight-for-height for their age, they are wasting, whereas a child is stunting when their height falls two or more standard deviations below the median height-for-age. Wasting often indicates acute undernutrition, while stunting manifests following chronic undernutrition. Other signs and symptoms may vary widely depending on the etiology of FTT.

The characteristic pattern seen with children with inadequate nutritional intake is an initial deceleration in weight gain, followed several weeks to months later by a deceleration in stature, and finally a deceleration in head circumference. Inadequate caloric intake could be caused by lack of access to food, or caretakers may notice picky eating habits, low appetite, or food refusal. FTT caused by malnutrition could also yield physical findings that indicate potential vitamin and mineral deficiencies, such as scaling skin, spoon-shaped nails, cheilosis, or neuropathy. Lack of food intake by a child could also be due to psychosocial factors related to the child or family. Screening patients and their caretakers for psychiatric conditions such as depression or anxiety is vital, as well as for signs and symptoms of child abuse, neglect, or emotional deprivation.

Children who have FTT caused by a genetic or medical problem may have differences in growth patterns compared to children with FTT due to inadequate food intake. A decrease in length with a proportional drop in weight can be related to long-standing nutritional factors or genetic or endocrine causes. Head circumference, as well, can be an indicator for the etiology of FTT. If head circumference is affected initially in addition to weight or length, other factors are more likely causes than inadequate intake. Some of these include intrauterine infection, teratogens, and some congenital syndromes.

Children who have a medical condition causing FTT may have additional signs and symptoms specific to their condition. Fetal alcohol syndrome (FAS) has been associated with FTT, and can present with characteristic findings including microcephaly, short palpebral fissures, a smooth philtrum and a thin vermillion border. Disorders that cause difficulties absorbing or digesting nutrients, such as Crohn's disease, cystic fibrosis, or celiac disease, can present with abdominal symptoms. Symptoms can include abdominal pain, abdominal distention, hyperactive bowel sounds, bloody stools, or diarrhea.

== Cause ==
Traditionally, causes of FTT have been divided into endogenous and exogenous causes, which can also be largely grouped into three categories - inadequate caloric intake, malabsorption/caloric retention defect, and increased metabolic demands.

Endogenous (or "organic")
Endogenous causes are due to physical or mental issues affecting the child. These causes include various inborn errors of metabolism. Problems with the gastrointestinal system such as excessive gas and acid reflux are painful conditions which may make the child unwilling to take in sufficient nutrition. Cystic fibrosis, diarrhea, liver disease, anemia or iron deficiency, Crohn's disease, and coeliac disease make it more difficult for the body to absorb nutrition. Other causes include physical deformities such as cleft palate and tongue tie that impede food intake. Additionally, allergies such as milk allergies can cause endogenous FTT. FAS has also been associated with failure to thrive. Additional, medical conditions including parasite infections, urinary tract infections, other fever-inducing infections, asthma, hyperthyroidism and congenital heart disease may raise energy needs of the body and cause greater difficulty taking in sufficient calories to meet the higher caloric demands, leading to FTT.
Exogenous (or "nonorganic")
Exogenous causes are due to caregiver actions, whether unintentional or intentional. Examples include physical inability to produce enough breastmilk, inappropriate feeding schedules or feeding technique, and mistakes made in formula preparation. In developing countries, conflict settings, and protracted emergencies, exogenous FTT may more commonly be caused by chronic food insecurity, lack of nutritional awareness, and other factors beyond the caregiver's control. As many as 90% of failure to thrive cases are non-organic.
Mixed
Both endogenous and exogenous factors may co-exist. For instance, a child who is not getting sufficient nutrition for endogenous reasons may act content so that caregivers do not offer feedings of sufficient frequency or volume. Yet, a child with severe acid reflux who appears to be in pain while eating may also make a caregiver hesitant to offer sufficient feedings.

=== Inadequate caloric intake ===
Inadequate caloric intake indicates that an insufficient amount of food and nutrition is entering the body, whether due to lack of food, anatomical differences causing difficulty eating, or psychosocial reasons for decreased food intake.

Cause	Description/presentation	Mechanism	Epidemiology
Poverty/inadequate food supply	Inadequate food available for child	Decreased food intake	Most common cause of failure to thrive globally
Inadequate breast milk supply/ineffective latching	Mother is unable to produce enough breast milk or infant is unable to latch properly during breastfeeding	Insufficient breastfeeding	
Improper preparation of formula	Formula is not prepared or mixed properly	Insufficient nutrition from formula feeding	
Postpartum depression/maternal depression	Mother experiences low mood, persistent sadness, and/or loss of interest or pleasure in activities	Mothers with depression are more likely to have breastfeeding difficulties and may have decreased desire to interact with their children, which may lead to decreased feeding	1 in 10 women in the US experience symptoms of depression 1 in 8 women experience symptoms of postpartum depression, or depression after childbirth
Child neglect	Caretakers fail to provide adequate care to the child	Caretakers do not adequately feed the child	Prevalence of neglect in non-organic FTT may be as high as 5-10%
Cerebral palsy	Disturbance in the developing fetal or infant brain leads to difficulties and delays in cognition, motor movement and coordination, and other aspects of development	Decreased motor function and coordination leads to difficulty feeding	Affects about 3.6/1000 children
Cleft lip/cleft palate	During fetal development, parts of the mouth/lips do not fuse properly, causing an anatomical defect	Impaired oral motor coordination and poor suck causes difficulty feeding	Occurs in about 1 in 600 to 800 live births
Gastroesophageal reflux disease	Regurgitation of food causes discomfort and irritability	Discomfort and pain after eating may cause poor appetite or refusal to feed	Occurrence peaks at about 4 months of age
Pyloric stenosis	Abnormal thickening of the opening between the stomach and small intestine blocks food from flowing through the gastrointestinal tract, causing projectile vomiting	Projectile vomiting after eating and inability of food to enter small intestine leads to dehydration and weight loss	Infant is usually well at birth, and pyloric stenosis usually presents at 3–6 weeks of age
Toxins causing gastrointestinal problems	Toxins such as lead can cause decreased appetite, constipation, or abdominal pain	Gastrointestinal problems and discomfort can lead to decreased appetite or refusal to eat	
Avoidant/restrictive food intake disorder (ARFID)	Psychiatric condition in which individuals avoid eating certain foods or restrict the amount of food they eat; may be due to sensory sensitivity, a traumatic experience with eating, or another cause	Food avoidance or restriction leads to inadequate nutritional intake	

=== Malabsorption/caloric retention defect ===
Malabsorption and caloric retention defects cause the body to the unable to absorb and use nutrients from food, despite an adequate amount of food physically entering the body.

Cause	Description/presentation	Mechanism	Epidemiology
Inborn errors of metabolism	Genetic conditions that interfere with the utilization of nutrients for energy; include conditions such as galactosemia, glycogen storage disease	Disruption in the breakdown of nutrients and to utilization of nutrients to produce energy	
Cow's milk protein allergy	Allergy to a protein in cow's milk, causing symptoms such as skin reactions, wheezing, difficulty breathing, diarrhea, or vomiting after ingestion of cow's milk	Inability to drink milk leads to poor growth; discomfort after drinking milk may also lead to food refusal	Affects 2-6% of children, primarily during the first year of life, though many children outgrow the condition
Celiac disease	Autoimmune disease in which ingestion of foods containing gluten leads to symptoms including diarrhea, abdominal pain, and bloating	Damage to intestinal lining leads to problems with nutrient uptake	Prevalence of 0.5-1% among the general population
Short bowel syndrome	Loss of functioning intestines due to surgery, congenital anatomical differences, or other disease	Shortage of functioning intestines leads to malabsorption of nutrients	Necrotizing enterocolitis is the most common cause in infancy
Cystic fibrosis	Disorder in production and clearance of mucus leads to problems with lung and gastrointestinal function	Problems with mucus clearance leads to issues with the pancreas and other gastrointestinal organs, leading to malabsorption of nutrients	Affects 1 in 2500 Caucasian newborns
Biliary atresia	Failure of development of the bile ducts that help carry enzymes necessary for digestion of fats in food Causes yellowing of the skin (jaundice), pale stools, and dark urine in the infant	Underdevelopment of bile ducts leads to malabsorption of fats, difficulties with absorbing vitamins and other nutrients, and poor oral intake of food	
Pancreatic insufficiency	Inability of pancreas to produce sufficient enzymes necessary for digestion and absorption of nutrients, leading to symptoms such as chronic diarrhea and greasy stools	Malabsorption of fats and inability to digest nutrients such as fat-soluble vitamins leads to poor weight gain	

=== Increased metabolic demand ===
Increased metabolic demand suggests a state of increased energy needs and caloric expenditure. This state causes greater difficulty taking in enough nutrition to meet the body's energy needs and allow for normal growth.

Cause	Description/presentation	Mechanism	Epidemiology
Hyperthyroidism	Increased levels or activity of thyroid hormone leads to elevated metabolic rate	Elevated metabolic rate causes increased energy usage	Most common cause among children is Graves' disease, causing about 96% of cases of hyperthyroidism
Chronic infections	Chronic infections such as HIV, tuberculosis, urinary tract infections	Infections result in increased energy expenditure	
TORCH infections	Toxoplasmosis, other (syphilis, varicella zoster, parvovirus B19), rubella, cytomegalovirus, herpes simplex virus	Infections result in increased energy expenditure	
Inflammatory conditions	Conditions such as asthma, inflammatory bowel disease	Inflammation increases energy utilization	
Diabetes mellitus	Group of disorders in which sugars are unable to be properly taken up into cells and used for energy, leading to high blood sugar levels Failure to thrive may be caused by a type of diabetes mellitus called neonatal diabetes mellitus	Inability to utilize sugars for energy leads to growth difficulties	
Congenital heart defects	Abnormalities in heart anatomy and function leads to problems pumping oxygen to the body, difficulties with breathing and feeding, and possible downstream issues with organs that do not receive enough oxygen	Breathing problems may make feeding more difficult Lack of oxygen to the intestines may cause malabsorption Overall decreased oxygen delivery to the body and increased energy needs may stunt growth	
Chronic lung disease	Conditions such as bronchopulmonary dysplasia, bronchiectasis, chronic lung disease of prematurity	Breathing difficulties may interfere with feeding Chronic disease and low oxygen state causes increased energy expenditure	
Cancer	Presentation varies depending on type of cancer, but include pain, swelling, fatigue, fever, headache, night sweats, loss of appetite	Rapid growth of cancer cells requires high energy usage	Pediatric cancers are less than 1% of all new cancer diagnoses Most common pediatric cancers are leukemia, brain and spinal cord tumors, and neuroblastoma
Chronic kidney disease	Dysfunction of the kidneys, the organs that filter blood and produce urine May be caused by anatomical differences in the kidneys and urinary tract, or by diseases (e.g., infections, diabetes) that cause damage to the kidneys	Damage to the kidneys leads to dysfunctional activity of growth hormone and other necessary hormones, disruptions to metabolism, inflammation causing increased expenditure, and disturbances in retention and utilization of nutrients	

== Epidemiology ==
Failure to thrive is a common presenting problem in the pediatric population in both resource-abundant and resource-poor countries. While epidemiology may vary by region, inadequate caloric intake remains the most common cause of FTT in both developed and developing countries, and poverty is the greatest risk factor for FTT worldwide.

=== Resource-abundant regions ===
Failure to thrive is prevalent in developed countries, with literature from Western studies demonstrating a prevalence of about 8% among pediatric patients. Presentations of FTT comprise about 5-10% of children seen as outpatients by primary care physicians and 3-5% of hospital admissions for children. Failure to thrive is more prevalent in children of lower socioeconomic status in both rural and urban areas. FTT is also associated with lower parental education levels. Additionally, retrospective studies done in the United States suggest that males are slightly more likely than females to be admitted to the hospital for failure to thrive.

=== Low-resourced regions ===
Failure to thrive is more common in developing countries and is mostly driven by malnutrition due to poverty. In an example of the high prevalence of FTT due to malnutrition, in India, about 40% of the population suffers from mild to moderate malnutrition and about 25% of pediatric hospitalizations are due to malnutrition.

Malnutrition is a global problem of great scale. Worldwide, problems with receiving adequate nutrition contributes to about 45% of all deaths in children younger than 5 years old. In 2020, global estimates of malnutrition indicated that 149 million children under 5 were stunted and 45 million were estimated to be wasted. In 2014, approximately 462 millions adults were estimated to be underweight. These reports are likely underestimating the true scope of the global burden.

Malnutrition can also be classified to acute malnutrition and chronic malnutrition. Acute malnutrition indicates inadequate or insufficient nutrient intake resulting in severe systemic degeneration. Globally, approximately 32.7 million children under 5 years are found to have visible and clinical signs of acute malnutrition. Severe wasting is seen in 14.3 million children within this age group. These disorders are primarily localized to resource-limited regions. In comparison, chronic malnutrition is a condition that develops over time and results in growth inadequacy with subsequent developmental, physical and cognitive delays. Around 144 million children worldwide are chronically malnourished.

== Diagnosis ==
The diagnosis of FTT relies on plotting the child's height and weight on a validated growth chart, such as the World Health Organization (WHO) growth charts for children younger than two years old or the U.S. Centers for Disease Control and Prevention (CDC) growth charts for patients between the ages of two and twenty years old. While there is no universally accepted definition for failure to thrive, the following are examples of diagnostic criteria for FTT:

- Weight under the 5th percentile among children of the same sex and corrected age;
- Weight for length below the 5th percentile among children of the same sex and age;
- Length for age below the 5th percentile;
- Body mass index for age under the 5th percentile;
- Weight for age or weight for length dropping by at least two major percentiles (95th, 90th, 75th, 50th, 25th, 10th, and 5th) on a growth chart;
- Weight below 75% of the median weight for age;
- Weight below 75% of median weight for length; or
- Weight velocity less than the 5th percentile.

After detection, the underlying cause of FTT must be diagnosed by a medical provider through a multifaceted process. Without determining what causes the growth problem, FTT is a wastebasket diagnosis. This process begins with evaluating the patient's medical history. The medical provider will ask about complications during pregnancy and birth, health during early infancy, previous or current medical conditions of the child, and developmental milestones that have been reached or not reached by the child. The child's feeding and diet history, including overall caloric intake and eating habits, is also assessed to help identify potential causes of FTT. Additionally, medical providers will inquire about any medical conditions that other members of the family may have, as well as assess the psychological and social circumstances of the child and family.

Next, a complete physical examination may be done, with special attention being paid to identifying possible organic sources of FTT. This could include looking for dysmorphic features (differences in physical features, such as an especially large or small head, that may indicate an underlying medical disorder), abnormal breathing sounds, and signs of specific vitamin and mineral deficiencies. The physical exam may also reveal signs of possible child neglect or abuse.

Based on the information gained from the history and physical examination, a workup can then be conducted, in which possible sources of FTT can be further probed through blood work, x-rays, or other tests. Laboratory workup should be done in response to specific history and physical examination findings. Medical providers should take care not to order unnecessary tests, especially given estimates that the usefulness of laboratory investigations for children with failure to thrive is 1.4%. Initial bloodwork may include a complete blood count (CBC) with differential to see if there are abnormalities in the number of blood cells, a complete metabolic panel to look for electrolyte derangements, a thyroid function test to assess thyroid hormone activity, and a urinalysis to test for infections or diseases related to the kidneys or urinary tract. If indicated, anti-TTG IgA antibodies can be used to assess for celiac disease, and a sweat chloride test can be used to screen for cystic fibrosis. If no cause is discovered, a stool examination could be indicated, which would give information about the function of gastrointestinal organs. C-reactive protein and erythrocyte sedimentation rate (ESR) can also be used look for signs of inflammation, which may indicate an infection or inflammatory disorder.

== Treatment ==
Infants and children who have had unpleasant eating experiences (e.g. acid reflux or food intolerance) may be reluctant to eat their meals. Additionally, force feeding an infant or child can discourage proper self-feeding practices and in-turn cause undue stress on both the child and their parents. Psychosocial interventions can be targeted at encouraging the child to feed themselves during meals. Also, making mealtimes a positive, enjoyable experience through the use of positive reinforcement may improve eating habits in children who present with FTT. If behavioral issues persist and are affecting nutritional habits in children with FTT it is recommended that the child see a psychologist. If an underlying condition, such as inflammatory bowel disease, is identified as the cause of the child's failure to thrive then treatment is directed towards the underlying condition. Special care should be taken to avoid refeeding syndrome when initiating feeds in a malnourished patient. Refeeding syndrome is caused by a shift in fluid and electrolytes in a malnourished person as they receive artificial refeeding. It is potentially fatal, and can occur whether receiving enteral or parenteral nutrition. The most serious and common electrolyte abnormality is hypophosphatemia, although sodium abnormalities are common as well. It can also cause changes in glucose, protein, and fat metabolism. Incidence of refeeding syndrome is high, with one prospective cohort study showing 34% of ICU experienced hypophosphatemia soon after feeding was restarted.

=== Low-resourced settings ===
Community-based management of malnutrition (CMAM) has been shown to be effective in many low resourced regions in the past two decades. This method includes providing children with ready-to-use therapeutic food (RUTF) and then following up with their health at home or at local health centers. RUTF is readily-consumed, shelf-stable food that provides all the nutrients required for recovery. It comes in different formulations, is generally a soft, semisolid paste, and can be sourced locally, commercially, or from agencies like UNICEF. In terms of efficacy, clinical experience and systemic reviews have shown higher recovery rates using CMAM than previous methods, such as milk-based formulas. While this is an efficient outpatient method to address FTT, children with underlying pathologies would require further inpatient workup.

RUTF should be treated as prescribed medication to the child experience FTT, and thus should not be shared with others in the family. The recommended feeding protocol is 5-6 servings a day for about 6–8 months, at which time many children will fully recover. Children should have a follow-up every week or two looking at weight and upper arm circumference. Follow-ups can be decreased if there is progress without complications, but if the child is not improving, then further evaluation for underlying issues is recommended. After treatment has ended, the child's caretakers should be counseled on how to continue feeding them and looking for signs of relapse.

Prevention is an effective strategy to address failure to thrive in resource limited regions. Recognition of at-risk populations is an important first step in approaching prevention. Infections such as HIV, tuberculosis and conditions causing diarrhea can be causative factors in failure to thrive. As such, addressing these conditions can greatly improve outcomes. Targeted supplementation strategies such as ready-to-eat foods or legume supplementation are valuable tools for preempting failure to thrive.

== Prognosis ==
Children with failure to thrive are at an increased risk for long-term growth, cognitive, and behavioral complications. Studies have shown that children with failure to thrive during infancy were shorter and lower weight at school-age than their peers. Failure to thrive may also result in children not achieving their growth potential, as estimated by mid-parental height. Longitudinal studies have also demonstrated slightly lower IQs (3–5 points) and poorer arithmetic performance in children with a history of failure to thrive, compared to peers receiving adequate nutrition as infants and toddlers. Early intervention and restoration of adequate nutrition has been shown to reduce the likelihood of long-term sequelae, however, studies have shown that failure to thrive may cause persistent behavioral problems, despite appropriate treatment.

== Etymology of the term FTT ==
FTT was first introduced in the early 20th century to describe poor growth in orphan children but became associated with negative implications (such as maternal deprivation) that often incorrectly explained the underlying issues. Throughout the 20th century, FTT was expanded to include many different issues related to poor growth, which made it broadly applicable but non-specific. It was often used to blame the mother. The current conceptualization of FTT acknowledges the complexity of faltering growth in children and has shed many of the negative stereotypes that plagued previous definitions.

== In older adults ==
The same label is given to older adults, as a synonym for frailty syndrome and functional decline. They may struggle with instrumental activities of daily living (e.g., preparing meals for themselves), be at high risk for hospital admission, and need significant discharge planning to support a safe and healthy return home.

== See also ==
- Developmental disorders
- Hospitalism
- Malnutrition
- Neonatal isoerythrolysis
- Refeeding syndrome
- SIDS
- Small for gestational age
- Stunted growth
