= Bowlby =

Bowlby is a surname. Notable people with the surname include:

- Anthony Alfred Bowlby (1855–1929), British surgeon and pathologist, son of Thomas William Bowlby
- David Bowlby, Canadian politician
- George Herbert Bowlby (1865–1916), Canadian physician, municipal politician, and military officer
- Henry Bowlby (1823–1894), Bishop Suffragan of Coventry 1891–1894
- John Bowlby (1907–1990), British developmental psychologist, son of Anthony Alfred Bowlby
- Ronald Anthony Bowlby (1926–2019), Anglican Bishop of Southwark 1980–1991
- Thomas William Bowlby (1818–1860), correspondent to The Times
- Ward Hamilton Bowlby (1834–1917), Canadian lawyer and politician
- April Bowlby (born 1980), American actor

== See also ==
- Bowlby baronets, a title in the Baronetage of the United Kingdom
- Bowlby, West Virginia, unincorporated community
