= History of attachment theory =

History of the interpersonal relationship framework

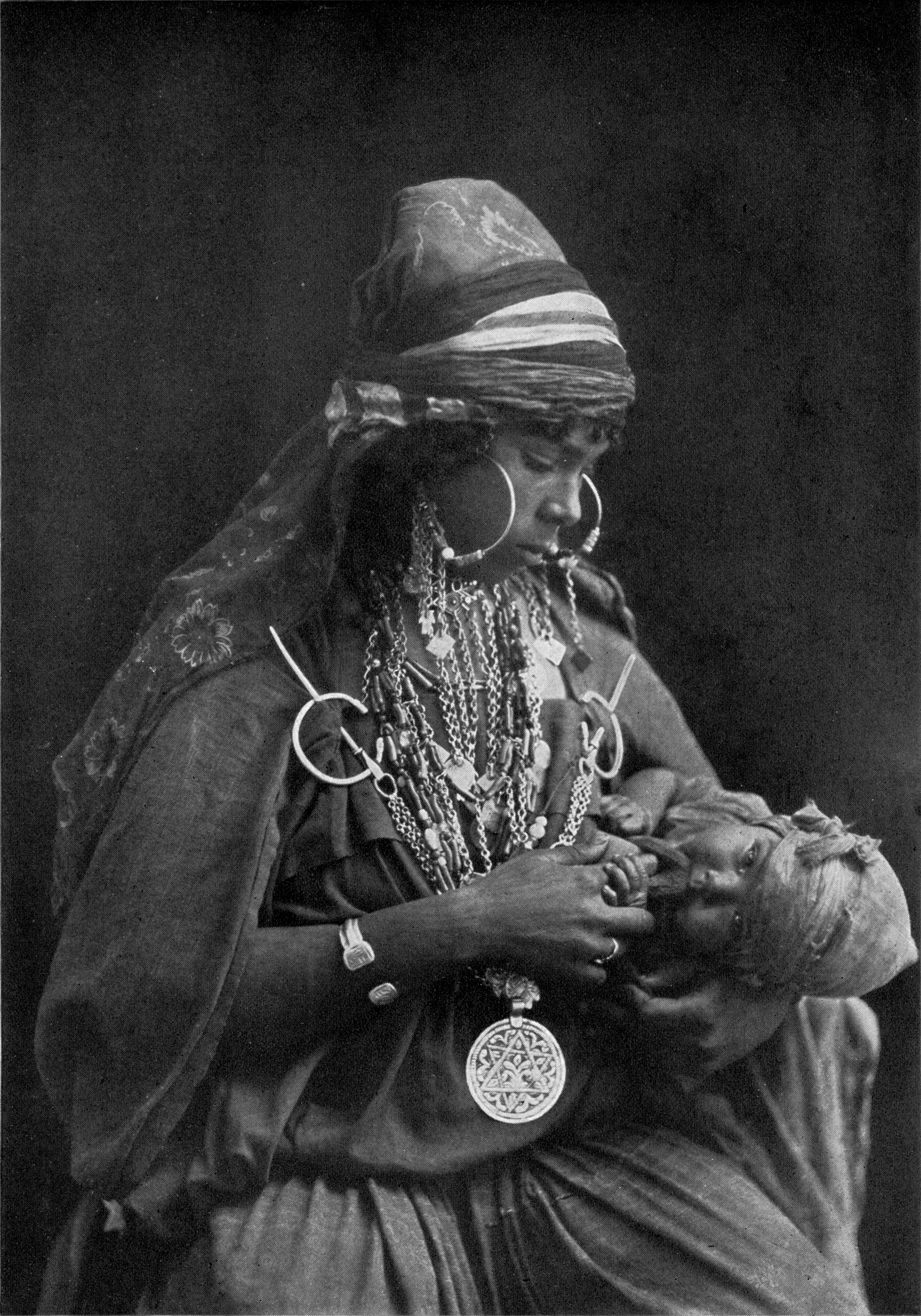
Mother and baby

Attachment theory, originating in the work of John Bowlby, is a psychological, evolutionary and ethological theory that provides a descriptive and explanatory framework for understanding interpersonal relationships between human beings.

Over the years he formulated his theory of early attachments, Bowlby drew from a range of fields of thinking and research including forensic psychology (as in his study of 44 juvenile thieves), ethology, evolutionary biology, object relations theory (the branch of psychoanalysis in which he was trained by Melanie Klein), systems theory and cognitive psychology. There were some preliminary papers from 1958 onwards, but the full theory is published in the trilogy Attachment and Loss, 1969- 82. Despite the criticism Bowlby's work has continued to face since its inception on empirical, ethical and logical grounds, attachment theory remains the dominant approach to understanding early social development, having given rise to a great surge of empirical research into the formation of children's close relationships.

== Brief description of theory ==
In infants, behavior associated with attachment is primarily a process of proximity seeking to an identified attachment figure in situations of perceived distress or alarm, for the purpose of survival. Infants become attached to adults who are sensitive and responsive in social interactions with the infant, and who remain as consistent caregivers for some months during the period from about six months to two years of age. During the later part of this period, children begin to use attachment figures (familiar people) as a secure base to explore from and return to. Parental responses lead to the development of patterns of attachment which in turn lead to 'internal working models' which will guide the individual's feelings, thoughts, and expectations in later relationships. Separation anxiety or grief following serious loss are normal and natural responses in an attached infant.

The human infant is considered by attachment theorists to have a need for a secure relationship with adult caregivers, without which normal social and emotional development will not occur. However, different relationship experiences can lead to different developmental outcomes. Mary Ainsworth developed a theory of a number of attachment patterns or "styles" in infants in which distinct characteristics were identified; these were secure attachment, avoidant attachment, anxious attachment and, later, disorganized attachment. In addition to care-seeking by children, peer relationships of all ages, romantic and sexual attraction, and responses to the care needs of infants or sick or elderly adults may be construed as including some components of attachment behavior.

== Post-war context ==
Attachment theory rode a post-World War Two wave in Westernized countries toward child-centred parenting. The child-centred message of Benjamin Spock's post-war manual The Common Sense Book of Baby and Child Care, first published in 1946, put it among the best-selling books of the twentieth century. Previous experts had warned parents not to spoil babies through rewarding them for crying by picking them up and comforting them, or by feeding them on demand. Babies should be fed once every four hours and otherwise left to cry it out. Spock saw such parenting as cruel. His manual promoted flexibility in child-rearing, advising parents to treat each child as an individual and emphasizing that, ultimately, the parents' common sense and their "natural loving care" were the keys to successful parenting.

A similar structure of feeling emerged in post-war Britain. Bowlby himself had been raised in a way which deprived him of maternal care. Brought up in a separate part of a big house by a nanny and nursemaids, he had just one one-hour visit to his mother a day. His father died when he was five, and at age seven he was dispatched to boarding school, coming home just once a year. He later remarked: “I wouldn’t send a dog away to boarding school at age seven”. So it is perhaps no surprise that, throughout his life, Bowlby’s work focused on the consequences of maternal deprivation. Nor, to the extent that a child-centred structure of feeling persists in the West, is it any surprise that attachment theory continues to dominate discussions of child care, despite its scientific challenges, especially among those who assume like Bowlby that a mother’s place is in the home.

=== Social deprivation as maternal deprivation ===
Before setting out his theory of attachment in the late 1950s, Bowlby published two books arguing that child problems—juvenile delinquency in 1944 and the poor health of homeless children in post-war Europe in 1951—resulted from lack of maternal care. In 1953, Bowlby wrote a commentary on James Robertson’s film A Two-Year-Old Goes to Hospital which championed more flexible visiting hours for the mothers of children in hospital. (The film documented the dramatic effects of the hospitalization of a young child whose parents did not visit her.)

Bowlby was further influenced by studies from René Spitz which contrasted the catastrophic, sometimes fatal, effects of institutionalisation on infants who had no contact with any committed caregiver when compared to those who daily had hour-long visits from their mothers. Also in the 1950s, Bowlby read the Harlows’ work on the disastrous effects of social isolation on caged rhesus monkey babies as evidence for primates’ need for one-to-one maternal care.

Bowlby and his heirs have habitually written as if the negative effects of social deprivation on young children result primarily from their lack of a mother. Yet the juvenile thieves, homeless children, institutionalised infants, hospitalized two-year-olds and isolated baby monkeys which Bowlby liked to discuss were deprived of many things and people, not just their mothers. For example, Harlow’s work showed that if a baby monkey grew up in a cage with other baby monkeys to relate to, all of them grew up more healthily than monkeys reared solely with their mothers. Likewise, homeless children lack all stable family-relations as well as having no secure place to live. It was partly on these grounds that Michael Rutter's detailed review challenged Bowlby’s claims about ‘maternal deprivation’. Likewise, much attachment research fails to control for a mother-infant couple’s social support and background. Attachment research which does control for social circumstances proves that the main determinant of a young child’s long-term development is the social circumstances which surround them and their parents, not the kind of attachment they have to their mothers.

=== Psychoanalysis ===
The early thinking of the object relations school of psychoanalysis, particularly Melanie Klein, influenced Bowlby. However, he profoundly disagreed with the prevalent psychoanalytic belief that infants' responses relate to their internal fantasy life rather than real-life events. As Bowlby formulated his concepts, he was influenced by case studies on disturbed and delinquent children, such as those of William Goldfarb published in 1943 and 1945.

Bowlby's view of attachment was also influenced by observations of young children separated from familiar caregivers, as provided during World War II by Anna Freud and her colleague Dorothy Burlingham.

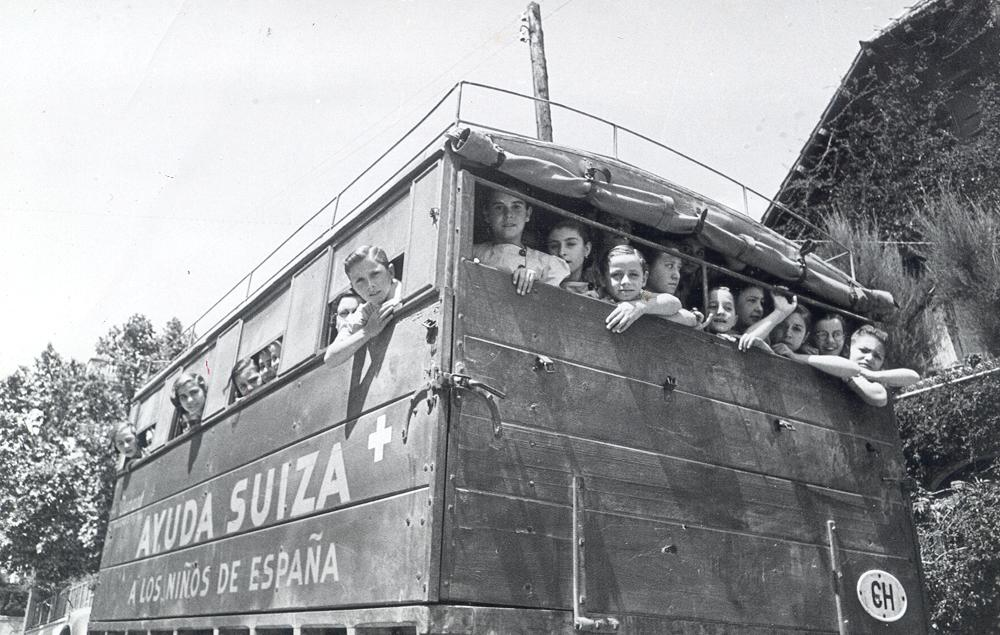
Evacuee children in 1937

However, Bowlby rejected psychoanalytical explanations for early infant bonds. He rejected both Freudian "drive-theory", which he called the Cupboard Love theory of relationships, and early object-relations theory as both in his view failed to see the attachment as a psychological bond in its own right rather than an instinct derived from feeding or sexuality.

Based on ideas of primary attachment and Neo-Darwinism, Bowlby identified what he saw as fundamental flaws in psychoanalysis: the overemphasis of internal dangers rather than external threat, and the view of the development of personality via linear phases with regression to fixed points accounting for psychological distress. Bowlby instead posited that several lines of development were possible, the outcome of which depended on the interaction between the organism and the environment. In attachment this would mean that although a developing child has a propensity to form attachments, the nature of those attachments depends on the environment to which the child is exposed.

From early in the development of attachment theory there was criticism of the theory's lack of congruence with various branches of psychoanalysis. For example, Freudians criticised him for denying in his theory any place for the father and the cultural influences he personified, influences which are at the heart of psychoanalytic theory. Bowlby's decisions left him open to criticism from well-established thinkers working on similar problems. In particular he opened himself up to critics who identified in attachment theory a biological reductionism which denied any place to cultural differences.

=== Ethology ===
Bowlby's attention was first drawn to ethology when he read Lorenz's 1952 publication in draft form although Lorenz had published much earlier work. Soon after this he encountered the work of Tinbergen, and began to collaborate with Robert Hinde. In 1953 he stated "the time is ripe for a unification of psychoanalytic concepts with those of ethology, and to pursue the rich vein of research which this union suggests".

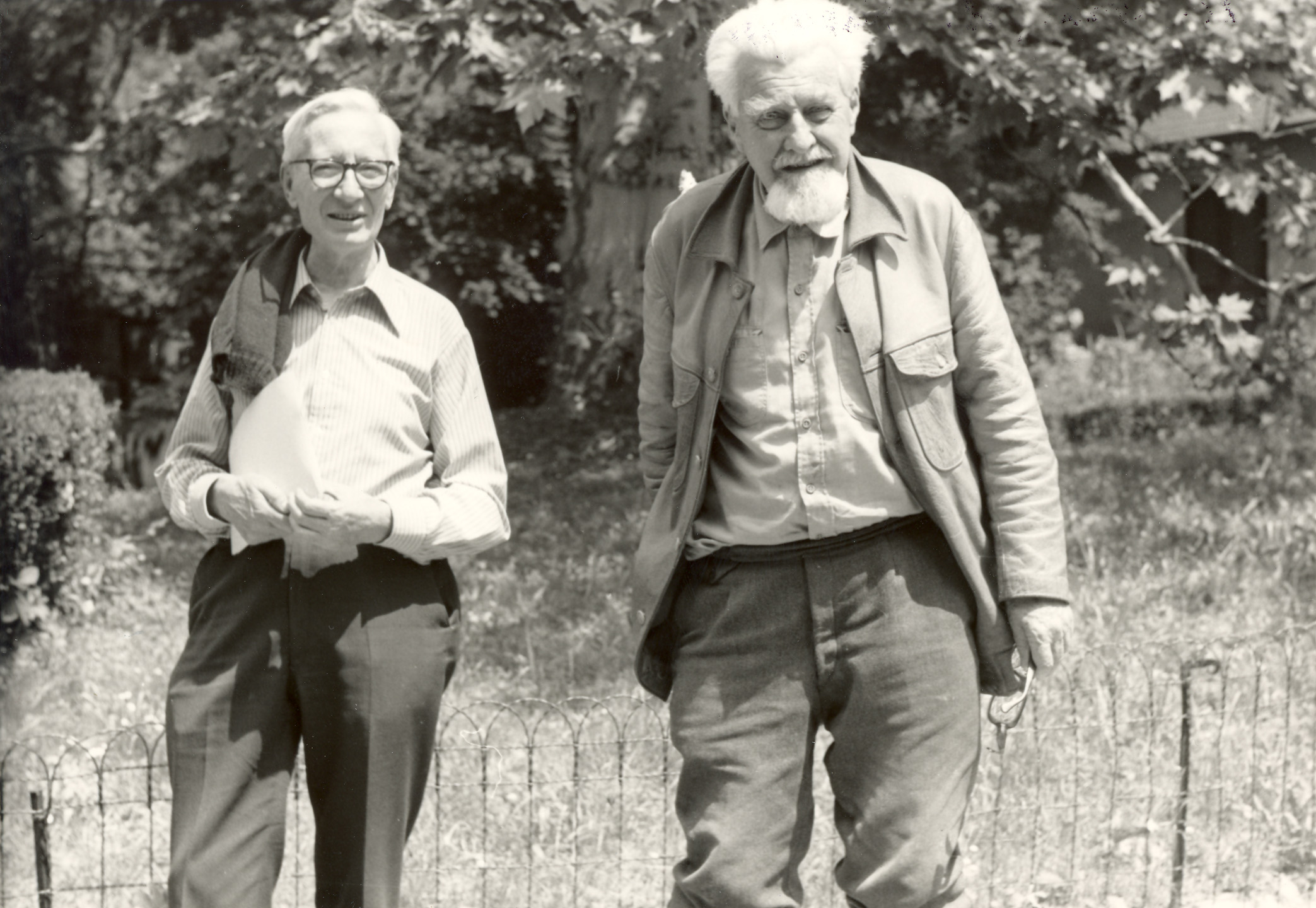
Konrad Lorenz and Nikolaas Tinbergen

Konrad Lorenz had examined the phenomenon of "imprinting" and felt that it might have some parallels to human attachment. Imprinting, a behavior characteristic of some birds and a very few mammals, involves rapid learning of recognition by a young bird or animal exposed to a conspecific or an object or organism that behaves suitably. The learning is possible only within a limited age period, known as a critical period. This rapid learning and development of familiarity with an animate or inanimate object is accompanied by a tendency to stay close to the object and to follow when it moves; the young creature is said to have been imprinted on the object when this occurs. As the imprinted bird or animal reaches reproductive maturity, its courtship behavior is directed toward objects that resemble the imprinting object. Bowlby's attachment concepts later included the ideas that attachment involves learning from experience during a limited age period, and that the learning that occurs during that time influences adult behavior. However, he did not apply the imprinting concept in its entirety to human attachment, nor assume that human development was as simple as that of birds. He did, however, consider that attachment behavior was best explained as instinctive in nature, an approach that does not rule out the effect of experience, but that stresses the readiness the young child brings to social interactions. Some of Lorenz's work had been done years before Bowlby formulated his ideas, and indeed some ideas characteristic of ethology were already discussed among psychoanalysts some time before the presentation of attachment theory.

Certain types of learning are possible, respective to each applicable type of learning, only within a limited age range known as a critical period. Bowlby's concepts included the idea that attachment involved learning from experience during a limited age period, influenced by adult behaviour. He did not apply the imprinting concept in its entirety to human attachment. However, he considered that attachment behaviour was best explained as instinctive, combined with the effect of experience, stressing the readiness the child brings to social interactions. Over time it became apparent there were more differences than similarities between attachment theory and imprinting so the analogy was dropped.

Ethologists expressed concern about the adequacy of some research on which attachment theory was based, particularly the generalization to humans from animal studies. Schur, discussing Bowlby's use of ethological concepts (pre-1960) commented that concepts used in attachment theory had not kept up with changes in ethology itself. Ethologists and others writing in the 1960s and 1970s questioned and expanded the types of behaviour used as indications of attachment. Observational studies of young children in natural settings provided other behaviours that might indicate attachment; for example, staying within a predictable distance of the mother without effort on her part and picking up small objects, bringing them to the mother but not to others. Although ethologists tended to be in agreement with Bowlby, they pressed for more data, objecting to psychologists writing as if there were an "entity which is 'attachment', existing over and above the observable measures." Robert Hinde considered "attachment behaviour system" to be an appropriate term which did not offer the same problems "because it refers to postulated control systems that determine the relations between different kinds of behaviour."

=== Behaviourism ===
Bowlby's theory opposed the idea that babies' attachments to their mothers were the product of learning through food-rewards, another version of cupboard love. Bowlby believed that mothering was a natural process and so was the infant's bonding, both being ancient products of human evolution. But the contest between attachment theory and learning theory has continued.

In 1969, Gerwitz discussed how mother and child could provide each other with positive reinforcement experiences through their mutual attention, thereby learning to stay close together. This explanation would make it unnecessary to posit innate human characteristics fostering attachment. Learning theory, (behaviourism), saw attachment as a remnant of dependency with the quality of attachment being merely a response to the caregiver's cues. The main predictors of attachment quality are parents being sensitive and responsive to their children. When parents interact with their infants in a warm and nurturing manner, their attachment quality increases. The way that parents interact with their children at four months is related to attachment behaviour at 12 months, thus it is important for parents' sensitivity and responsiveness to remain stable. The lack of sensitivity and responsiveness increases the likelihood for attachment disorders to development in children. Behaviourists saw behaviours like crying as a random activity meaning nothing until reinforced by a caregiver's response. To behaviourists, frequent responses would result in more crying. To attachment theorists, crying is an inborn attachment behaviour to which the caregiver must respond if the infant is to develop emotional security. Conscientious responses produce security which enhances autonomy and results in less crying. Ainsworth's research in Baltimore supported the attachment theorists' view.

In the last decade, behaviour analysts have constructed models of attachment based on the importance of contingent relationships. These behaviour analytic models have received some support from research and meta-analytic reviews.

=== Cognitive psychology ===
Bowlby discovered the internal working model construct in the writings of an eminent scientist interested in the neural basis of animal memory, J. Z. Young, while rethinking what he considered to be scientifically outdated explanations of the psychoanalytic “internal world.” Young himself was utilizing the work of the philosopher Kenneth Craik, who had noted the adaptiveness of the ability of thought to predict events, and stressed the survival value of and natural selection for this ability. According to Craik, prediction occurs when a "small-scale model" consisting of brain events is used to represent not only the external environment, but the individual's own possible actions. This model allows a person to mentally try out alternatives and to use knowledge of the past in responding to the present and future. At about the same time that Bowlby was applying Craik's ideas to the study of attachment, other psychologists were using these concepts in discussion of adult perception and cognition.

Craik stressed the survival value of natural selection for this ability. A key component of attachment theory is the attachment behaviour system where certain behaviours have a predictable outcome (i.e. proximity) and serve as self-preservation method (i.e. protection). All taking place outside of an individual's awareness, this internal working model allows a person to try out alternatives mentally, using knowledge of the past while responding to the present and future. Bowlby applied Craik's ideas to attachment, when other psychologists were applying these concepts to adult perception and cognition. He hypothesized that an infant's internal working model is developed in response to the infant's experience based internal working models of self, and environment, with emphasis on the caregiving environment and the outcomes of their proximity-seeking behaviours. Theoretically, secure child and adult script, would allow for an attachment situation where one person successfully utilizes another as a secure base from which to explore and as a safe haven in times of distress. In contrast, insecure individuals would create attachment situations with more complications.

=== Cybernetics ===
The theory of control systems (cybernetics), developing during the 1930s and '40s, influenced Bowlby's thinking. The young child's need for proximity to the attachment figure was seen as balancing homeostatically with the need for exploration. The actual distance maintained would be greater or less as the balance of needs changed; for example, the approach of a stranger, or an injury, would cause the child to seek proximity when a moment before he had been exploring at a distance.

== Genesis of Bowlby's theory ==
A theory of attachment is a framework of ideas that attempt to explain attachment, the almost universal human tendency to prefer certain familiar companions over other people, especially when ill, injured, or distressed. Historically, certain social preferences, like those of parents for their children, were explained by reference to instinct, or the moral worth of the individual.

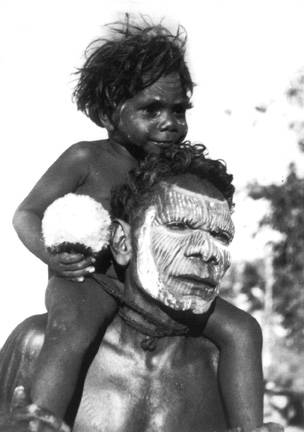
Father and child

The concept of infants' emotional attachment to caregivers has been known anecdotally for hundreds of years. Most early observers focused on the anxiety displayed by infants and toddlers when threatened with separation from a familiar caregiver. Psychological theories about attachment were suggested from the late nineteenth century onward. Freudian theory attempted a systematic consideration of infant attachment and attributed the infant's attempts to stay near the familiar person to motivation learned through feeding experiences and gratification of libidinal drives. In the 1930s, the British developmentalist Ian Suttie put forward the suggestion that the child's need for affection was a primary one, not based on hunger or other physical gratifications. A third theory prevalent at the time of Bowlby's development of attachment theory was "dependency". This approach posited that infants were dependent on adult caregivers but that dependency was, or should be outgrown as the individual matured. Such an approach perceived attachment behaviour in older children as regressive whereas within attachment theory older children and adults remain attached and indeed a secure attachment is associated with independent exploratory behaviour rather than dependence. William Blatz, a Canadian psychologist and teacher of Bowlby's colleague Mary Ainsworth, was among the first to stress the need for security as a normal part of personality at all ages, as well as normality of the use of others as a secure base and the importance of social relationships for other aspects of development.

Current attachment theory focuses on social experiences in early childhood as the source of attachment in childhood and in later life. Attachment theory was developed by Bowlby as a consequence of his dissatisfaction with existing theories of early relationships.

=== Beginnings ===
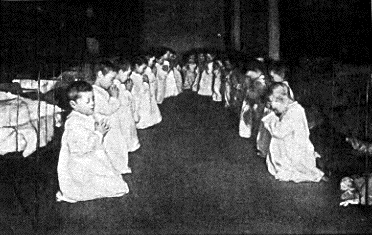
Prayer time in the Five Points House of Industry residential nursery, 1888. The maternal deprivation hypothesis published in 1951 spurred a shift away from the use of residential nurseries in favour of foster homes.

In his 1951 monograph for the World Health Organization, Maternal Care and Mental Health, Bowlby put forward the hypothesis that "the infant and young child should experience a warm, intimate, and continuous relationship with his mother in which both find satisfaction and enjoyment", the lack of which may have significant and irreversible mental health consequences. This was also published as Child Care and the Growth of Love for public consumption. The central proposition was influential but highly controversial. At the time there was limited empirical data and no comprehensive theory to account for such a conclusion. Nevertheless, Bowlby's theory sparked considerable interest in the nature of early relationships, giving a strong impetus to, (in the words of Mary Ainsworth), a "great body of research" in an extremely difficult, complex area.

Bowlby's work (and Robertson's films) is often credited with causing a virtual revolution in a hospital visiting by parents, hospital provision for children's play, educational and social needs, and the use of residential nurseries. But historians now argue that Bowlby played just a part in a far larger movement towards child-centred care in hospitals in post World War 2 Western societies. For example, over time, orphanages were abandoned in favour of foster care or family-style homes in most developed countries without reference to Bowlby.

=== Forensic psychology ===
The origins of attachment theory within forensic psychology can be found in the work of August Aichhorn. In applying psychoanalysis to pedagogy, he argued that abnormal child relationships are the underlying problem causing delinquency.

The intersection of crime and attachment theory was further researched by John Bowlby. In his first published work, Forty-four Juvenile Thieves, he studied a sample of 88 children (44 juvenile thieves and 44 non-delinquent controls) and determined that child-mother separation caused delinquent character formation, particularly in the development of an "affectionless character" often seen in the persistent offender. 17 of the juvenile thieves had been separated from their mothers for longer than six months during their first five years, and only 2 children from the control group had such a separation. He also found that 14 of the thieves were "affectionless characters" distinguishing them from others by their lack of affection, no emotional ties, no real friendships, and having "no roots in their relationships".

=== First theoretical statements ===
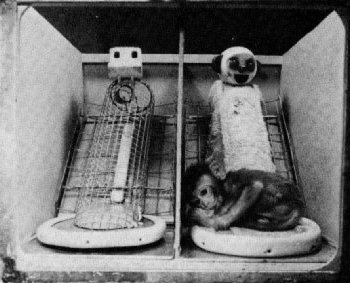
Love Wire and cloth mother surrogates in Harry Harlow's The Nature of Love

Following the publication of Maternal Care and Mental Health, Bowlby sought new understanding from such fields as evolutionary biology, ethology, developmental psychology, cognitive science and control systems theory and drew upon them to formulate the innovative proposition that the mechanisms underlying an infants tie emerged as a result of evolutionary pressure. He realised that he had to develop a new theory of motivation and behaviour control, built on up-to-date science rather than the outdated psychic energy model espoused by Freud. Bowlby expressed himself as having made good the "deficiencies of the data and the lack of theory to link alleged cause and effect" in "Maternal Care and Mental Health" in his later work "Attachment and Loss" published between 1969 and 1980.

Bowlby's first official representations were carried out for the relationship theory in three very controversial lectures in 1957 by the British Psychoanalytical Society in London. The formal origin of attachment theory can be traced to the publication of two 1958 papers, one being Bowlby's The Nature of the Child's Tie to his Mother, in which the precursory concepts of "attachment" were introduced, and Harry Harlow's The Nature of Love, based on the results of experiments which showed, approximately, that infant rhesus monkeys spent more time with soft mother-like dummies that offered no food than they did with dummies that provided a food source but were less pleasant to the touch. Bowlby followed this up with two more papers, Separation Anxiety (1960a), and Grief and Mourning in Infancy and Early Childhood (1960b). At about the same time, Bowlby's former colleague, Mary Ainsworth was completing extensive observational studies on the nature of infant attachments in Uganda with Bowlby's ethological theories in mind. Mary Ainsworth's innovative methodology and comprehensive observational studies informed much of the theory, expanded its concepts and enabled some of its tenets to be empirically tested. Attachment theory was finally presented in 1969 in Attachment the first volume of the Attachment and Loss trilogy. The second and third volumes, Separation: Anxiety and Anger and Loss: Sadness and Depression followed in 1972 and 1980 respectively. Attachment was revised in 1982 to incorporate more recent research.

== Developments since the 1970s ==
In the 1970s, problems with viewing attachment as a trait (stable characteristic of an individual) rather than as a type of behaviour with organizing functions and outcomes, led some authors to the conclusion that attachment behaviours were best understood in terms of their functions in the child's life. This way of thinking saw the secure base concept as central to attachment theory's logic, coherence, and status as an organizational construct. Following this argument, the assumption that attachment is expressed identically in all humans cross-culturally was examined. The research showed that though there were cultural differences, the three basic patterns, secure, avoidant and ambivalent, can be found in every culture in which studies have been undertaken, even where communal sleeping arrangements are the norm. The selection of the secure pattern is found in the majority of children across cultures studied. This follows logically from the fact that attachment theory provides for infants to adapt to changes in the environment, selecting optimal behavioural strategies. How attachment is expressed shows cultural variations which need to be ascertained before studies can be undertaken; for example Gusii infants are greeted with a handshake rather than a hug. Securely attached Gusii infants anticipate and seek this contact. There are also differences in the distribution of insecure patterns based on cultural differences in child-rearing practices. The scholar Michael Rutter in 1974 studied the importance of distinguishing between the consequences of attachment deprivation upon intellectual retardation in children and lack of development in the emotional growth in children. Rutter's conclusion was that a careful delineation of maternal attributes needed to be identified and differentiated for progress in the field to continue.

The biggest challenge to the notion of the universality of attachment theory came from studies conducted in Japan where the concept of amae plays a prominent role in describing family relationships. Arguments revolved around the appropriateness of the use of the Strange Situation procedure where amae is practised. Ultimately research tended to confirm the universality hypothesis of attachment theory. Most recently a 2007 study conducted in Sapporo in Japan found attachment distributions consistent with global norms using the six-year Main and Cassidy scoring system for attachment classification.

Critics in the 1990s such as J. R. Harris, Steven Pinker and Jerome Kagan were generally concerned with the concept of infant determinism (nature versus nurture), stressing the effects of later experience on personality. Building on the work on temperament of Stella Chess, Kagan rejected almost every assumption on which attachment theory's cause was based. Kagan argued that heredity was far more important than the transient developmental effects of early environment. For example, a child with an inherently difficult temperament would not elicit sensitive behavioural responses from a caregiver. The debate spawned considerable research and analysis of data from the growing number of longitudinal studies. Subsequent research has not borne out Kagan's argument, possibly suggesting that it is the caregiver's behaviours that form the child's attachment style, although how this style is expressed may differ with the child's temperament. Harris and Pinker put forward the notion that the influence of parents had been much exaggerated, arguing that socialization took place primarily in peer groups. H. Rudolph Schaffer concluded that parents and peers had different functions, fulfilling distinctive roles in children's development.

Psychoanalyst/psychologists Peter Fonagy and Mary Target have attempted to bring attachment theory and psychoanalysis into a closer relationship through cognitive science as mentalization. Mentalization, or theory of mind, is the capacity of human beings to guess with some accuracy what thoughts, emotions and intentions lie behind behaviours as subtle as facial expression. It has been speculated that this connection between theory of mind and the internal working model may open new areas of study, leading to alterations in attachment theory. Since the late 1980s, there has been a developing rapprochement between attachment theory and psychoanalysis, based on common ground as elaborated by attachment theorists and researchers, and a change in what psychoanalysts consider to be central to psychoanalysis. Object relations models which emphasise the autonomous need for a relationship have become dominant and are linked to a growing recognition in psychoanalysis of the importance of infant development in the context of relationships and internalized representations. Psychoanalysis has recognized the formative nature of a child's early environment including the issue of childhood trauma. A psychoanalytically based exploration of the attachment system and an accompanying clinical approach has emerged together with a recognition of the need for measurement of outcomes of interventions.

One focus of attachment research has been the difficulties of children whose attachment history was poor, including those with extensive non-parental child care experiences. Concern with the effects of child care was intense during the so-called "day care wars" of the late-20th century, during which some authors stressed the deleterious effects of day care. As a result of this controversy, training of child care professionals has come to stress attachment issues, including the need for relationship-building by the assignment of a child to a specific care-giver. Although only high-quality child care settings are likely to provide this, more infants in child care receive attachment-friendly care than in the past. A natural experiment permitted extensive study of attachment issues as researchers followed thousands of Romanian orphans adopted into Western families after the end of the Nicolae Ceaușescu regime. The English and Romanian Adoptees Study Team, led by Michael Rutter, followed some of the children into their teens, attempting to unravel the effects of poor attachment, adoption, new relationships, physical problems and medical issues associated with their early lives. Studies of these adoptees, whose initial conditions were shocking, yielded reason for optimism as many of the children developed quite well. Researchers noted that separation from familiar people is only one of many factors that help to determine the quality of development. Although higher rates of atypical insecure attachment patterns were found compared to native-born or early-adopted samples, 70% of later-adopted children exhibited no marked or severe attachment disorder behaviours.

Authors considering attachment in non-Western cultures have noted the connection of attachment theory with Western family and child care patterns characteristic of Bowlby's time. As children's experience of care changes, so may attachment-related experiences. For example, changes in attitudes toward female sexuality have greatly increased the numbers of children living with their never-married mothers or being cared for outside the home while the mothers work. This social change has made it more difficult for childless people to adopt infants in their own countries. There has been an increase in the number of older-child adoptions and adoptions from third-world sources in first-world countries. Adoptions and births to same-sex couples have increased in number and gained legal protection, compared to their status in Bowlby's time. Regardless of whether parents are genetically related, adoptive parents attachment roles they will still influence and affect their child's attachment behaviours throughout their lifetime. Issues have been raised to the effect that the dyadic model characteristic of attachment theory cannot address the complexity of real-life social experiences, as infants often have multiple relationships within the family and in child care settings. It is suggested these multiple relationships influence one another reciprocally, at least within a family.

Principles of attachment theory have been used to explain adult social behaviours, including mating, social dominance and hierarchical power structures, in-group identification, group coalitions, membership in cults and totalitarian systems and negotiation of reciprocity and justice. Those explanations have been used to design parental care training, and have been particularly successful in the design of child abuse prevention programmes.

While a wide variety of studies have upheld the basic tenets of attachment theory, research has been inconclusive as to whether self-reported early attachment and later depression are demonstrably related.

Interest in attachment theory was later extended to adult romantic relationships by Cindy Hazan and Phillip Shaver. Peter Fonagy and Mary Target have attempted to bring attachment theory and psychoanalysis into a closer relationship by way of such aspects of cognitive science as mentalization, the ability to estimate what the beliefs or intentions of another person may be. A "natural experiment" has permitted extensive study of attachment issues, as researchers have followed the thousands of Romanian orphans who were adopted into Western families after the end of Nicolae Ceauşescu's regime. The English and Romanian Adoptees Study Team, led by Michael Rutter, has followed some of the children into their teens, attempting to unravel the effects of poor attachment, adoption and new relationships, and the physical and medical problems associated with their early lives. Studies on the Romanian adoptees, whose initial conditions were shocking, have in fact yielded reason for optimism. Many of the children have developed quite well, and the researchers have noted that separation from familiar people is only one of many factors that help to determine the quality of development.

Neuroscientific studies are examining the physiological underpinnings of observable attachment style, such as vagal tone which influences capacities for intimacy, stress response which influences threat reactivity (Lupien, McEwan, Gunnar & Heim, 2009), as well as neuroendocrinology such as oxytocin. These types of studies underscore the fact that attachment is an embodied capacity not only a cognitive one.

== Effects of changing times and approaches ==
Some authors have noted the connection of attachment theory with Western family and child care patterns characteristic of Bowlby's time. The implication of this connection is that attachment-related experiences (and perhaps attachment itself) may alter as young children's experience of care change historically. For example, changes in attitudes toward female sexuality have greatly increased the numbers of children living with their never-married mothers and being cared for outside the home while the mothers work.

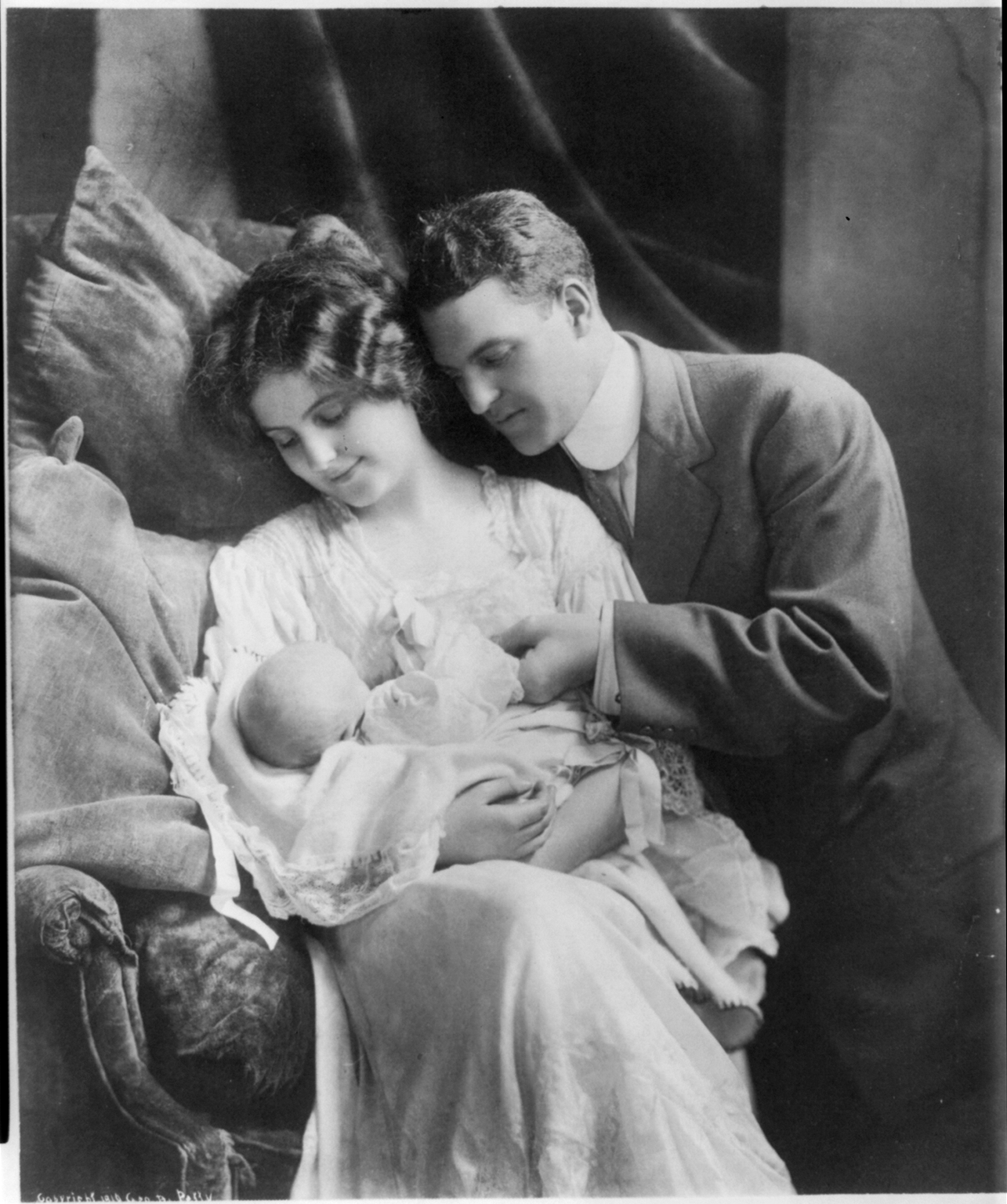
Parents and baby

This social change, in addition to increasing abortion rates, has also made it more difficult for childless people to adopt infants in their own countries, and has increased the number of older-child adoptions and adoptions from third-world sources. Adoptions and births to same-sex couples have increased in number and even gained some legal protection, compared to their status in Bowlby's time.

One focus of attachment research has been on the difficulties of children whose attachment history was poor, including those with extensive non-parental child care experiences. Concern with the effects of child care was intense during the so-called "day care wars" of the late 20th century, during which the deleterious effects of day care were stressed. As a beneficial result of this controversy, training of child care professionals has come to stress attachment issues and the need for relationship-building through techniques such as assignment of a child to a specific care provider. Although only high-quality child care settings are likely to follow through on these considerations, nevertheless a larger number of infants in child care receive attachment-friendly care than was the case in the past, and emotional development of children in nonparental care may be different today than it was in the 1980s or in Bowlby's time.

Finally, any critique of attachment theory needs to consider how the theory has connected with changes in other psychological theories. Research on attachment issues has begun to include concepts related to behaviour genetics and to the study of temperament (constitutional factors in personality), but it is unusual for popular presentations of attachment theory to include these. Importantly, some researchers and theorists have begun to connect attachment with the study of mentalization or Theory of Mind, the capacity that allows human beings to guess with some accuracy what thoughts, emotions, and intentions lie behind behaviours as subtle as facial expression or eye movement. The connection of theory of mind with the internal working model of social relationships may open a new area of study and lead to alterations in attachment theory.

== Reception ==
=== 1950s to the 1970s ===
The maternal deprivation hypothesis, attachment theory's precursor, was enormously controversial. Ten years after the publication of the hypothesis, Ainsworth listed nine concerns that she felt were the chief points of controversy. Ainsworth separated the three dimensions of maternal deprivation into lack of maternal care, distortion of maternal care and discontinuity of maternal care. She analysed the dozens of studies undertaken in the field and concluded that the basic assertions of the maternal deprivation hypothesis were sound although the controversy continued. As the formulation of attachment theory progressed, critics commented on empirical support for the theory and for the possible alternative explanations for results of empirical research. Wootton questioned the suggestion that early attachment history (as it would now be called) had a lifelong impact.

In 1957 found the young relationship theory in the DDR (East Germany) by an essay of James Robertson in the Zeitschrift für ärztliche Fortbildung (magazine for a medical further education) and Eva Schmidt-Kolmer carried out some journal extracts from Bowlby's essay Maternal Care and mental Health for WHO. In the following period it came to extensive comparative development psychological in the DDR at the end of the fifties. Examinations between family-bound babies and small children, day and week hayracks-as well as Institution children. The findings could do with regard to the morbidity for the family-bound children, the physical and emotional development as well as adaption disturbances at change of environment. After the construction of the Berlin Wall 1961 it didn't come to any additional publications in the DDR Relationship theory and comparative investigations with family-bound children. The previous ones Research results weren't published further and got like the relationship theory into oblivion in the DDR in the subsequent years.

In the 1970s, problems with the emphasis on attachment as a trait (a stable characteristic of an individual) rather than as a type of behaviour with important organising functions and outcomes, led some authors to consider that "attachment (as implying anything but infant-adult interaction) [may be said to have] outlived its usefulness as a developmental construct..." and that attachment behaviours were best understood in terms of their functions in the child's life. Children may achieve a given function, such as a sense of security, in many different ways and the various but functionally comparable behaviours should be categorized as related to each other. This way of thinking saw the secure base concept (the organisation of exploration of an unfamiliar situation around returns to a familiar person) as "central to the logic and coherence of attachment theory and to its status as an organizational construct." Similarly, Thompson pointed out that "other features of early parent-child relationships that develop concurrently with attachment security, including negotiating conflict and establishing cooperation, also must be considered in understanding the legacy of early attachments."

=== Specific disciplines ===
==== Psychoanalysis ====
From an early point in the development of attachment theory, there was criticism of the theory's lack of congruence with the various branches of psychoanalysis. Like other members of the British object-relations group, Bowlby rejected Melanie Klein's views that considered the infant to have certain mental capacities at birth and to continue to develop emotionally on the basis of fantasy rather than of real experiences. But Bowlby also withdrew from the object-relations approach (exemplified, for example, by Anna Freud), as he abandoned the "drive theory" assumptions in favor of a set of automatic, instinctual behaviour systems that included attachment. Bowlby's decisions left him open to criticism from well-established thinkers working on problems similar to those he addressed. Bowlby was effectively ostracized from the psychoanalytic community. More recently some psychoanalysts have sought to reconcile the two theories in the form of attachment-based psychotherapy, a therapeutic approach.

==== Ethology ====
Ethologists expressed concern about the adequacy of some of the research on which attachment theory was based, particularly the generalisation to humans from animal studies. Schur, discussing Bowlby's use of ethological concepts (pre-1960) commented that these concepts as used in attachment theory had not kept up with changes in ethology itself.

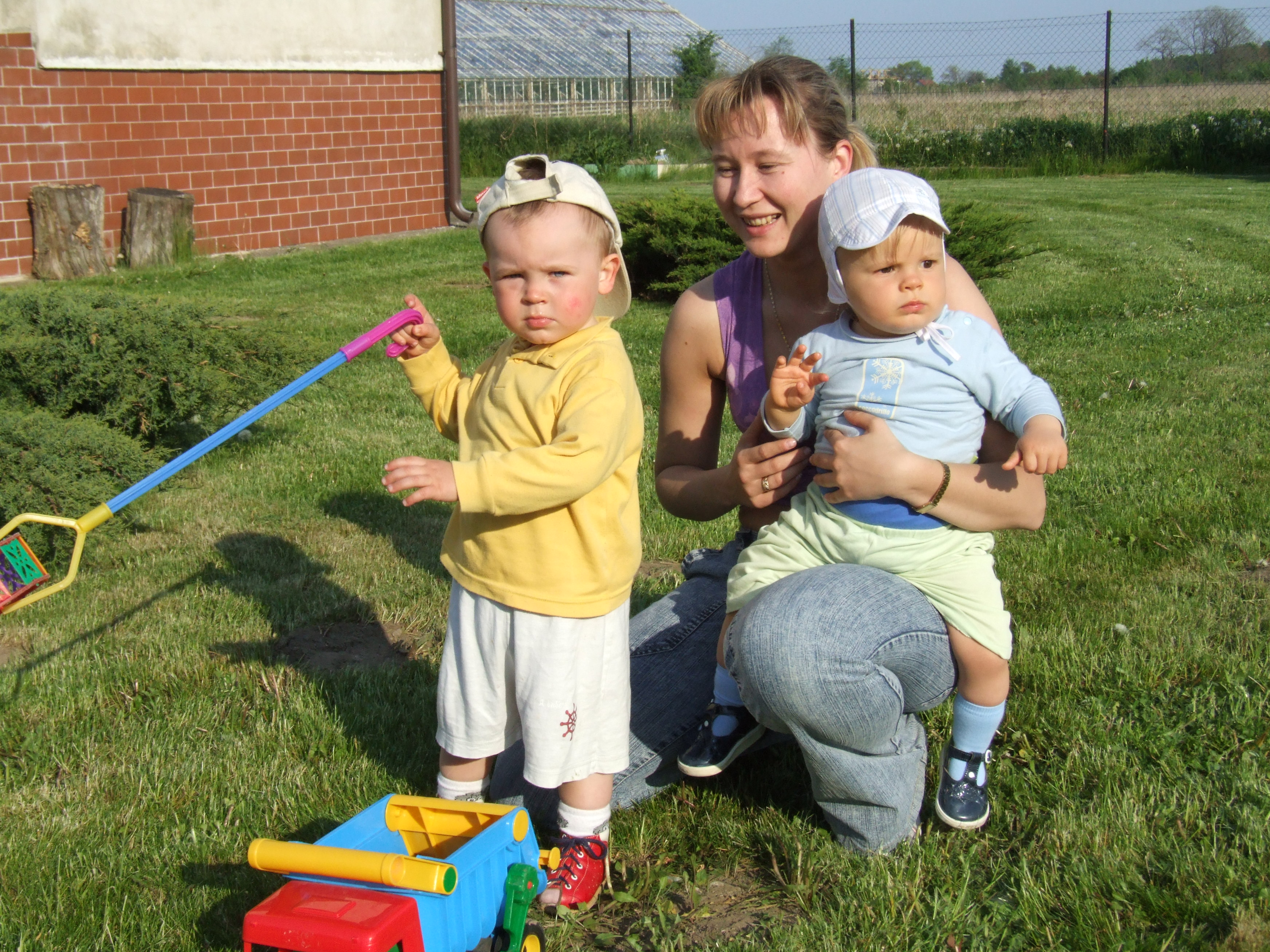
Ready to explore

Ethologists and others writing in the 1960s and 1970s questioned the types of behaviour used as indications of attachment, and offered alternative approaches. For example, crying on separation from a familiar person was suggested as an index of attachment. Observational studies of young children in natural settings also provided behaviours that might be considered to indicate attachment; for example, staying within a predictable distance of the mother without effort on her part and picking up small objects and bringing them to the mother, but usually not other adults. Although ethological work tended to be in agreement with Bowlby, work like that just described led to the conclusion that "[w]e appear to disagree with Bowlby and Ainsworth on some of the details of the child's interactions with its mother and other people". Some ethologists pressed for further observational data, arguing that psychologists "are still writing as if there is a real entity which is 'attachment', existing over and above the observable measures."

Robert Hinde expressed concern with the use of the word "attachment" to imply that it was an intervening variable or a hypothesised internal mechanism rather than a data term. He suggested that confusion about the meaning of attachment theory terms "could lead to the 'instinct fallacy' of postulating a mechanism isomorphous with the behaviours, and then using that as an explanation for the behaviour". However, Hinde considered "attachment behaviour system" to be an appropriate term of theory language which did not offer the same problems "because it refers to postulated control systems that determine the relations between different kinds of behaviour."

==== Cognitive development ====
Bowlby's reliance on Piaget's theory of cognitive development gave rise to questions about object permanence (the ability to remember an object that is temporarily absent) and its connection to early attachment behaviours, and about the fact that the infant's ability to discriminate strangers and react to the mother's absence seems to occur some months earlier than Piaget suggested would be cognitively possible. More recently, it has been noted that the understanding of mental representation has advanced so much since Bowlby's day that present views can be far more specific than those of Bowlby's time.

==== Behaviourism ====
In 1969, Gewirtz discussed how mother and child could provide each other with positive reinforcement experiences through their mutual attention and therefore learn to stay close together; this explanation would make it unnecessary to posit innate human characteristics fostering attachment. Learning theory saw attachment as a remnant of dependency and the quality of attachment as merely a response to the caregivers cues. Behaviourists saw behaviours such as crying as a random activity that meant nothing until reinforced by a caregivers response therefore frequent responses would result in more crying. To attachment theorists, crying is an inborn attachment behaviour to which the caregiver must respond if the infant is to develop emotional security. Conscientious responses produce security which enhances autonomy and results in less crying. Ainsworth's research in Baltimore supported the attachment theorists view. In the last decade, behaviour analysts have constructed models of attachment based on the importance of contingent relationships. These behaviour analytic models have received some support from research and meta-analytic reviews.

=== Methodology ===
There has been critical discussion of conclusions drawn from clinical and observational work, and whether or not they actually support tenets of attachment theory. For example, Skuse based criticism of a basic tenet of attachment theory on the work of Anna Freud with children from Theresienstadt, who apparently developed relatively normally in spite of serious deprivation during their early years. This discussion concluded from Freud's case and from some other studies of extreme deprivation that there is an excellent prognosis for children with this background, unless there are biological or genetic risk factors. The psychoanalyst Margaret Mahler interpreted ambivalent or aggressive behaviour of toddlers toward their mothers as a normal part of development, not as evidence of poor attachment history.

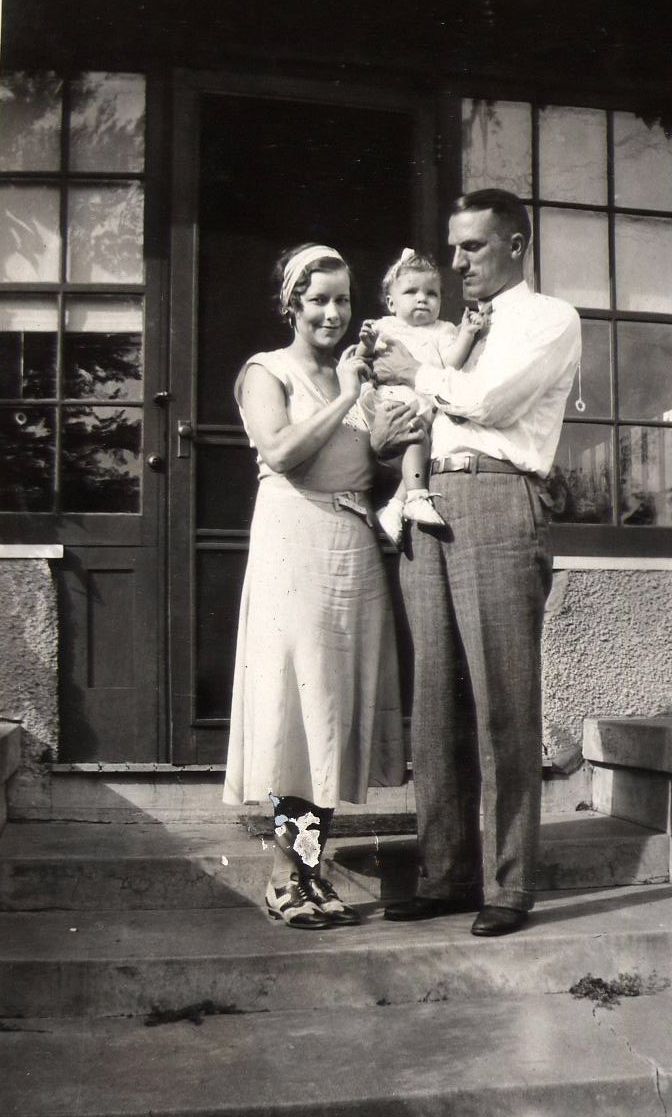
Parents and child

Some of Bowlby's interpretations of the data reported by James Robertson were eventually rejected by the researcher, who reported data from 13 young children who were cared for in ideal circumstances during separation from their mothers. Robertson noted, "...Bowlby acknowledges that he draws mainly upon James Robertson's institutional data. But in developing his grief and mourning theory, Bowlby, without adducing non-institutional data, has generalized Robertson's concept of protest, despair and denial beyond the context from which it was derived. He asserts that these are the usual responses of young children to separation from the mother regardless of circumstance..."; however, of the 13 separated children who received good care, none showed protest and despair, but "coped with separation from the mother when cared for in conditions from which the adverse factors which complicate institutional studies were absent". In the second volume of the trilogy, Separation, published two years later, Bowlby acknowledged that Robertsons foster study had caused him to modify his views on the traumatic consequences of separation in which insufficient weight was given to the influence of skilled care from a familiar substitute.

Some authors have questioned the idea of attachment patterns, thought to be measured by techniques like the Strange Situation Protocol. Such techniques yield a taxonomy of categories considered to represent qualitative difference in attachment relationships (for example, secure attachment versus avoidant). However, a categorical model is not necessarily the best representation of individual difference in attachment. An examination of data from 1139 15-month-olds showed that variation was continuous rather than falling into natural groupings. This criticism introduces important questions for attachment typologies and the mechanisms behind apparent types, but in fact has relatively little relevance for attachment theory itself, which "neither requires nor predicts discrete patterns of attachment." As was noted above, ethologists have suggested other behavioural measures that may be of greater importance than Strange Situation behaviour.

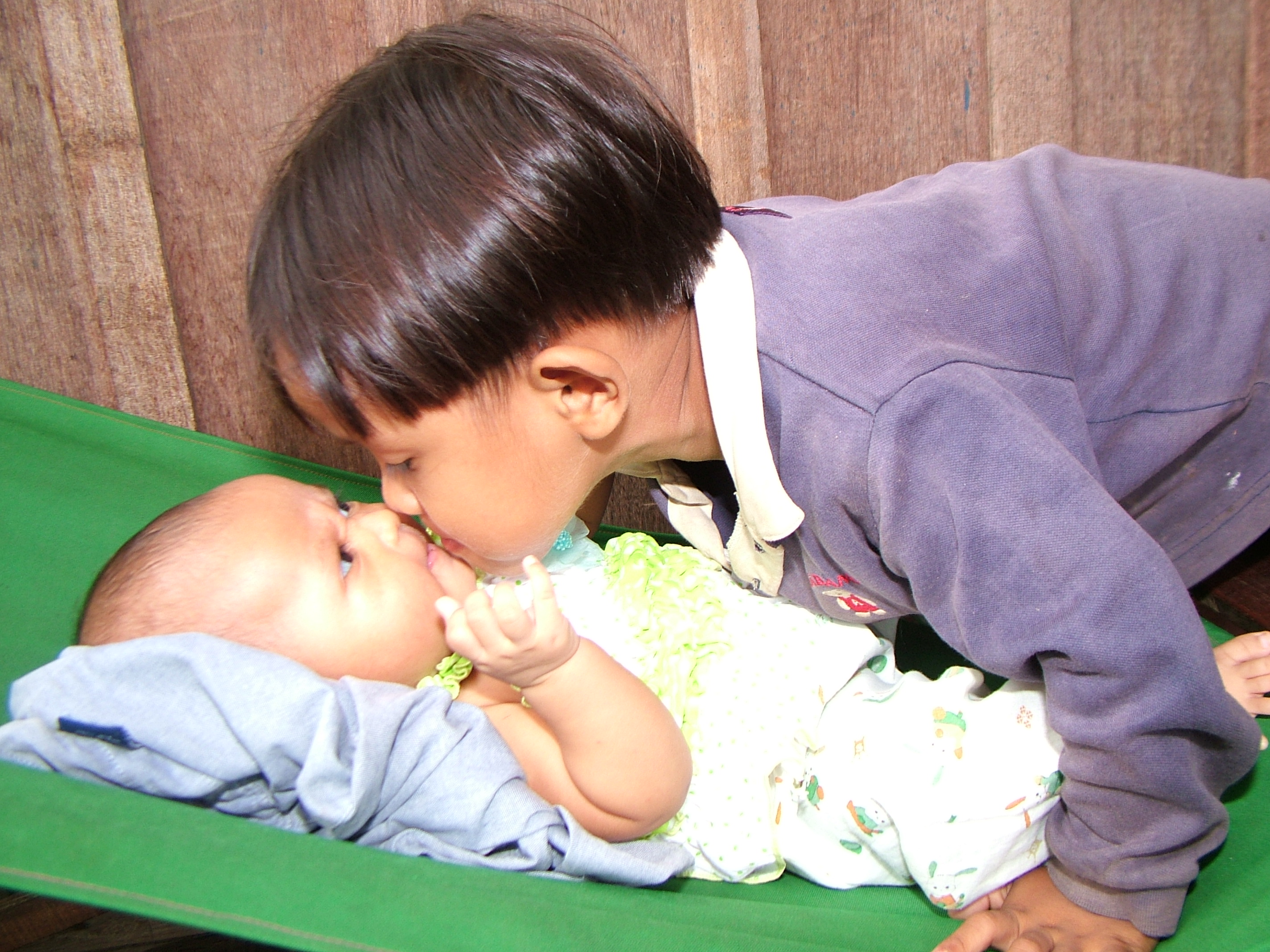
Children

=== 1980s on ===
Following the argument made in the 1970s that attachment should not be seen as a trait (lasting characteristic of the individual), but instead should be regarded as an organising principle with varying behaviours resulting from contextual factors, later research looked at cross-cultural differences in attachment, and concluded that there should be re-evaluation of the assumption that attachment is expressed identically in all humans. Various studies appeared to show cultural differences but a 2007 study conducted in Sapporo in Japan found attachment distributions consistent with global norms using the six-year Main & Cassidy scoring system for attachment classification.

Recent critics such as J. R. Harris, Steven Pinker and Jerome Kagan are generally concerned with the concept of infant determinism (Nature versus nurture) and stress the possible effects of later experience on personality. Building on the earlier work on temperament of Stella Chess, Kagan rejected almost every assumption on which attachment theory etiology was based, arguing that heredity was far more important than the transient effects of early environment, for example a child with an inherent difficult temperament would not illicit sensitive behavioural responses from their care giver. The debate spawned considerable research and analysis of data from the growing number of longitudinal studies. Subsequent research has not bourne out Kagan's argument and broadly demonstrates that it is the caregivers' behaviours that form the child's attachment style although how this style is expressed may differ with temperament.

Harris and Pinker have put forward the notion that the influence of parents has been much exaggerated and that socialisation takes place primarily in peer groups, although H. Rudolph Schaffer concludes that parents and peers fulfill different functions and have distinctive roles in children's development. Concern about attachment theory has been raised with regard to the fact that infants often have multiple relationships, within the family as well as in child care settings, and that the dyadic model characteristic of attachment theory cannot address the complexity of real-life social experiences.

== See also ==
- Attachment theory
- John Bowlby
- Behavior analysis of child development
