= Crowell procedure =

The Crowell procedure is a tool used to assess the parent-child relationship. Crowell and Feldman created the assessment tool for use in a study. The tool, which includes seven activities for the parent-child dyad to complete, is used for both preventive and clinical purposes. Crowell and Feldman's 1988 piece introducing the Crowell Method has been cited in over 500 studies. The assessment procedure has also been proven to be a reliable measure in discriminating between clinical and non-clinical dyads. The procedure is also known as the Crowell Parent-Child Interaction Procedure and the Crowell Problem Solving Procedure Rating Scale.

== Creation ==
Originally, Crowell and Feldman modified a pre-existing problem-solving session made for 24- and 42- month old children in order to examine relationships between mothers' internal working models and their children's behavioral and developmental statuses. The research pair developed the task to include all of the children in the study, who ranged from 24 to 52 months. The procedure aimed to examine caregivers and their children to determine their enjoyment with one another in a play setting and their ability to work as a pair. The procedure also allows researchers to observe any transition preparation and the child's subsequent reactions.

== Procedure ==
The assessment consists of seven activities. Throughout the tasks, the parent and child are alone in a room together. They are observed either through a one-way mirror or using video recording. The focus of the observation is on the parent and child's interaction with one another.

The procedure begins with the parent and child engaging in unstructured free play for ten minutes. Then they engage in a five-minute cleanup period. Following cleanup, two to four developmentally graded tasks are completed at the pair's pace. The tasks increase in difficulty so that the latter tasks cannot be completed without assistance from a caregiver. Lastly, a two-minute separation and reunion occurs.

== Scoring ==
Parents' are rated on a 7-point scale titled "mother's help and support." The scale was originally created by averaging two other measures recorded on a 7-point scale. The first was supportive presence, which was analyzed by examining whether a mother provides a secure base for the child to explore and return to and whether the mother values the child's experience more than the child's performance. The second measure was the quality of the assistance provided for the developmental tasks. The major criteria for assessing the quality of assistance were helping the child understand what they were to accomplish and providing only minimal support for the child to complete the task.

The child's behavior is scored on 7-point scales for enthusiasm, persistence, self-reliance, affection, negativity, avoidance, controlling behavior, anxiety, and compliance.

However, other texts describe only seven items for rating children's behavior: positive affect, withdrawn/depressed, irritability/anger, noncompliance, aggression toward parent, enthusiasm, and task persistence.

Moreover, recent works suggest that the multiple rating scales from the Crowell procedure can be condensed into two scales, one for the parent and one for the child. The caregiver is rated on overall responsiveness while the child is rated on their affective presentation. These scales are defined using the representative items that were originally measured on Crowell and Feldman's rating scales. An analysis of these scales indicated high internal consistency, providing support for their reliability. The researchers suggest that in future models the two scores could be combined in order to provide a picture of the pair's overall functioning.

== Practical use ==
The assessment has been used for children as young as 12-months and as old as 7 years-old. However, the assessment was designed for children ages 24–52 months, or preschool aged.

The assessment is used to diagnose attachment disorders in caregiver-child dyads. It is able to discriminate between clinical and non-clinical dyads and can identify differences between maltreated and healthy children. The assessment is used to identify pairs that need intervention or may need intervention in the future. It is also useful to assess the efficacy of intervention after its implementation.

== Modifications ==
Over the years since its original development, the steps of the procedure have been altered for use in other clinical and experimental settings.

One addition to the procedure is the inclusion of a bubble-blowing task after the clean-up period.

In studies examining children with PTSD and in studies observing individuals who are survivors of incest, the separation/reunification phase has been excluded.

The Crowell procedure has also been adapted for children under the age of one year old. Although they are not verbal and not proficiently mobile, a majority of the activities can still be replicated for use with infants. The focus of the modified activities is on social, face-to-face interactions. Different tasks are used for the teaching portions of the procedure, but the activity is still used to evaluate parental expectations and the abilities of the parent to guide their child's learning.
