= Cuthbert Wallace =

British surgeon

Major-General Sir Cuthbert Wallace Bt KCMG CB JP FRCS
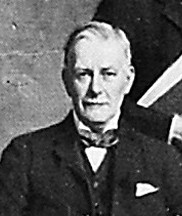
- Credit: Wellcome Library
- Born: Cuthbert Sidney Wallace; 20 June 1867; Surbiton, Surrey, England
- Died: 24 May 1944 (aged 76); Mount Vernon Hospital, London, England

Sir Cuthbert Sidney Wallace, 1st Baronet (20 June 1867 – 24 May 1944) was a British surgeon.

He was born in Surbiton, Surrey, the youngest son of the Rev. John Wallace and educated at Winchester House School, Haileybury College, 1881–86, and St Thomas's Hospital, London.

At St Thomas's he was a successively appointed house surgeon, senior obstetric house physician, surgical registrar and in 1897, resident assistant surgeon. During the Second Boer War (1899–1900) he volunteered to work at the Portland Hospital in Bloemfontein under Anthony Bowlby. After the war he returned to St Thomas's as an assistant surgeon and was in 1913 promoted to surgeon.

During the First World War he served in France as a consulting surgeon to the First Army, British Expeditionary Force, with the temporary rank of colonel, Army Medical Services, being promoted to major-general in 1917. During the German spring offensive of 1918, For his war service he was created C.M.G in 1916 and C.B. in 1918, and promoted K.C.M.G. in 1919.

After the war he again returned to St Thomas's to serve as senior surgeon and director of the surgical unit and was later elected consultant surgeon and dean of the medical school. He was also dean of the Medical Faculty of the University of London.

He was on the council of the Royal College of Surgeons of England for 24 years, was a vice-president in 1926-27, and president in 1935-38. He delivered the Bradshaw Lecture (on prostate enlargement) in 1927 and gave the Hunterian oration in 1934. He was created a Baronet in 1937. In his later career he sat on a number of committees and commissions. During the Second World War he was appointed chairman of the consultant advisers to the Ministry of Health's emergency medical service, was a member of the Army Medical Advisory Board, and was appointed chairman of the Medical Research Council's committee for the application of the results of new research to the treatment of war wounds.

He died in Mount Vernon Hospital, London on 24 May 1944. He had married Florence Mildred, the daughter of Herbert Jackson of Sussex Place, Regent's Park, but had no children.

== Publications ==
- A Civilian War Hospital, with Anthony Bowlby, being an account of the work of the Portland Hospital and of experience of wounds and sickness in South Africa, 1900 (etc.), 8vo, 50 plates, London, 1901.
- War Surgery of the Abdomen, 1918, Author: Cuthbert Sidney Wallace, Publisher: J. & A. Churchill, 1918
- Surgery at a Casualty Clearing Station, with Sir John Fraser, 1918, Publisher: London, A. & C. Black, ltd.

Baronetage of the United Kingdom
New creation	Baronet (of Studham); 1937–1944	extinct
