= Cupboard love =

Psychoanalytic theory of attachment

Cupboard love is a popular learning theory of the 1950s and 1960s based on the research of Sigmund Freud, Anna Freud, Melanie Klein and Mary Ainsworth. Rooted in psychoanalysis, the theory speculates that attachment develops in the early stages of infancy. This process involves the mother satisfying her infant's instinctual needs, exclusively. Cupboard love theorists conclude that during infancy, our primary drive is food which leads to a secondary drive for attachment.

== Origin and evolution of cupboard love theories ==
=== Sigmund Freud (1856–1939) ===
Sigmund Freud, founder of psychoanalysis, was the first to suggest that attachment is a result of the mother fulfilling her infant's physiological needs. Eventually, the infant begins to comprehend that the mother is the primary caregiver, becoming attached through the feeding process.

Freud believed this instinctive demeanor was rooted in years of evolution, from the time of hunter gatherers. Approximately four million years ago, humans were governed by instinctive behaviors, where they learned how to live in difficult conditions. Similarly, Freud hypothesized that the infant is also guided by an instinctive nature, forming a bond with the person who will ensure their survival.

=== René Spitz (1887–1974) ===
René Spitz (1959) proposed a phase called "eight-month anxiety" when an infant develops anxiety when left alone with strangers, and the mother is absent. The author is also known for describing the consequences of mother deprivation in the development of babies, resulting in the syndromes of Hospitalism and Anaclitic Depression, depending on the time the child is left without the mother and the age they are on when the mother leaves.

=== Therese Benedek (1892–1977) ===
Therese Benedek (1952) studied symbiosis between the mother and infant. She suggested that the phase of extra-uterine symbiosis (events characteristic of a mother infant relationship, including crying, sleep, feeding, etc.) produces reciprocal interactions between the mother and infant. When the mother satisfies the needs of the infant, the infant is not only grateful having been satisfied, but it is also grateful to the mother for providing protection and a sense of security. These interactions build a sense of trust and preserve the security of symbiosis.

=== Heinz Hartman (1894–1970) ===
Heinz Hartmann focused on the connection between ego functions and object relations. He acknowledged the importance of communication and understanding between the child and the mother. His research concluded, that during a later phase of infancy, the child begins to comprehend the difference between the love or loss of love from the mother and an object.

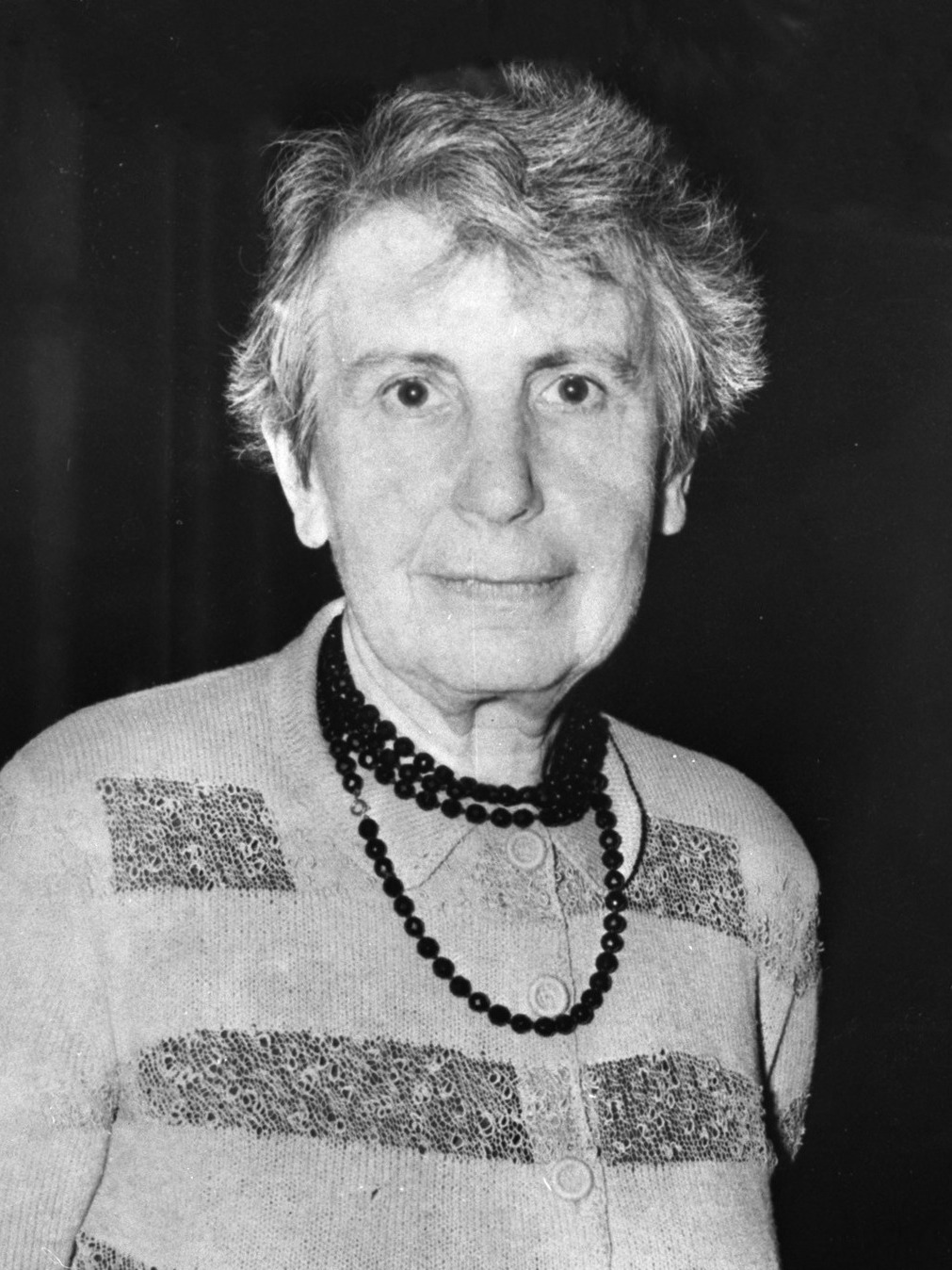
Anna Freud (1957)

=== Anna Freud (1895–1982) ===
Sigmund Freud's youngest daughter, Anna Freud (1954) expanded on her father's idea of the instinct theory, associating the origin of object relations with gratification. Her research deduced that an infant is naturally self-centered, only communicating with the mother to satisfy its needs and produce a pleasurable state of being. She concluded that in the early stages of infancy, the child does not love their mother, but rather the experience of being fed.

In 1965, she defined true object relations as the later stage in development where "the baby perceives his/her mother as a person separate from himself." Regardless of the infant's needs, the mother is not forgotten and is missed when absent.

=== Melanie Klein (1882–1960) ===
Melanie Klein's emphasizes that the mother's breast is the infant's perceived object of maximum gratification. Klein claims that the infant's concept of gratification is just as strongly related to the object which provides gratification, as to the food itself.

=== Margaret Mahler (1897–1985) ===
Margaret Mahler (1965) modified Benedek's concept of symbiosis. Mahler described a parasite-host relationship between the fetus and mother during the prenatal period. During the postnatal period, the baby enters a phase called the "symbiotic envelope" where their primary task is to separate from the mother, instead of forming a relationship of attachment.

=== Dr. Sibylle Escalona (1915–1996) ===
Sibylle Escalona (1953) placed less emphasis on need-gratification than previous literature. Instead, she suggested that mother-infant interactions, such as smiling, babbling and playing, do not fulfill the infant's physiological needs, as the baby's self and non-self awareness is not fully developed.

== Developing the theory of attachment ==
=== John Bowlby (1907–1990) ===
Psychoanalyst John Bowlby argued that the cupboard love theory overemphasized the positive aspects of the infant-mother relationship. His research aimed to expand on initial studies and perspectives on attachment to include the nature and emotional dynamic of the child's tie to his mother.

Bowlby described attachment as being a reciprocal relationship, where both the parents and the child become attached to each other. He also favored the ethological view of attachment, rooted in instinct. The foundation of his research inferred that our ability to form attachment is based on a genetic blueprint, allowing the mother to interact and communicate with her infant.

In addition, Bowlby also strongly debated the idea of monotropy; the scenario where the infant will only form attachment with one person. This concept was proven false by studies in psychoanalytic literature.

=== Mary Ainsworth (1913–1999) ===
Mary Ainsworth supported the cupboard love theory early in her career, but was later swayed otherwise by Bowlby and his studies focused on ethology. She reasoned against, claiming that the cupboard love theory supported the rationale that attachment is only a one-way relationship. It did not factor in the significance of the mother's acceptance towards her child in developing attachment. Sigmund Freud's research also highlighted the significance of an emotional bond between the infant and caregiver in developing a child's superego.

Prior to their meeting, Ainsworth was inspired by Bowlby to travel to Uganda to study infant-mother interaction. Based on her findings in Uganda, she later conducted a longitudinal study in Baltimore. Here, she studied infant behavior, making observations based on infants responses during the Strange Situation task. Her results led to the identification of four key dimensions of maternal care: sensitivity - insensitivity, cooperation - interference, acceptance - rejection, and accessibility - ignoring/neglecting.

Later in her career, Ainsworth collaborated with John Bowlby (1949–1953) to further develop the Theory of Attachment. Her experimental research provided empirical evidence, validating Bowlby's hypothesis on the infant attachment process with their primary caregivers.

== Theory of attachment ==
Bowlby describes attachment as the "affectionate ties we feel for the special people in our lives." The child begins the process of attachment in early infancy, eventually relying on the caregiver for feelings of comfort and safety. In time, the child may become distressed when the caregiver is absent, wanting to remain in their proximity.

=== Developing attachment in infancy ===
Attachment is the result of social interaction between an infant and caregiver over a gradual period of time.

==== Phases of attachments ====
Infants develop attachment through a series of phases that range from ages 0 to 9 months. A secure attachment promotes the exploration of the close surrounding environment.

===== 1. Asocial Phase =====
The asocial phase occurs during the first 0–6 weeks of infancy. Infants respond equally to both social and nonsocial stimuli, but show preference for a smiling face.

===== 2. Phase of indiscriminate attachment =====
The phase of indiscriminate attachment occurs between six weeks and six to seven months. During this phase, the infant begins to favor social interaction, especially from primary caregivers.

===== 3. Specific attachment phase =====
The specific attachment phase occurs between seven and nine months. During this period, the infant becomes increasingly attached to the mother, and becomes distressed and cautious around strangers.

===== 4. Phase of multiple attachments =====
At 18 months, infants develop multiple attachments towards other family members and relatives.

==== Types of attachment ====
It is possible to characterize the attachment between the infant and the caregiver using the Strange Situation procedure. Following the experiment, the infant's quality of attachment is characterized in one of four ways.

===== 1. Secure Attachment =====
This is the most common categorization, occurring in 60–65% of American infants. The infant feels safe to explore and interact with strangers while the mother is nearby, preferring her company when distressed.

===== 2. Resistant attachment =====
This category makes up 10% of infants. They are insecure, remaining close to their mother. They explore very little, are cautious of strangers, and become stressed when the mother is absent. When the mother returns, the infant will remain near her but will avoid physical contact.

===== 3. Avoidant attachment =====
20% of infants in American are considered to have avoidant attachment. They remain neutral when the mother is absent, often ignoring both the mother and strangers.

===== 4. Disorganized =====
The infants categorized as disorganized/disorientated are the most insecure and make up 5–15% of American infants. They exhibit both avoidant and resistant attachment behavior. This infant will become fearful when the mother is absent, and avoid her when reunited.

Synchronized routines play a significant role in the development of interactional synchrony, predictors for quality attachment. During the first few months of infancy it is important for the caregiver to react using appropriate facial gestures, to the infant's behavior. An infant may experience distress if the mother chooses to communicate with her child using a "still-face." Therefore, unpredictable responses from the mother towards the infant can have the power to affect the quality and the speed at which attachment develops.

==== Factors that affect attachment ====
===== 1. Culture =====
Culture can affect the categorization of infant attachment. In Germany, infants are encouraged to be more independent, exhibiting what is perceived as avoidant attachment. In Japan, children are more likely to develop stranger anxiety as parents rarely leave them in the care of another. This phenomenon is referred to as Amae, where children are dependent on their mother.

===== 2. Quality of care-giving =====
Ainsworth speculates that quality attachment is dependent on quality attention from the mother. A mother who promotes secure infant attachment is generally sensitive, has a positive attitude, and is supportive. Infants often develop resistant attachment when the parents are inconsistent in their caregiving. An infant is at risk of developing insecure attachment when the mother is self-centered, abusive, depressed, or mistreats her infant.

==== 3. Ecological constraints ====
Insecure attachment is likely to develop if the parents are experiencing health-related, legal, financial or relationship problems.

==== 4. Infant temperament ====
An infant who resists change and is easily distressed is more likely to develop resistant attachment. Whereas, an infant who is friendly and easy going to more prone to develop a secure attachment.

=== Fathers as attachment objects ===
Until the 1970s, fathers were perceived as biological necessities with a minor role in their development. Today, there is a range of data illustrating that fathers are highly involved in their infant's life, but play a different role than the mother. Mothers are more like to hold, talk, and soothe the infants, whereas fathers provide physical stimulation and unpredictable games.

== Cupboard love in psychoanalysis and behaviorism ==
Both psychoanalytic and behaviorist theories acknowledge that attachment is formed when the mother satisfies her infant's basic needs. However, they argue on how these needs are met. Psychoanalysts debate that a baby can only be gratified through physiological means (feeding, security, etc.). Whereas, behaviorists contend that conditioning is more probable. Regardless, each theory suggests that attachment is a form of “cupboard love” as the mother is only loved because she satisfies her infant's needs.

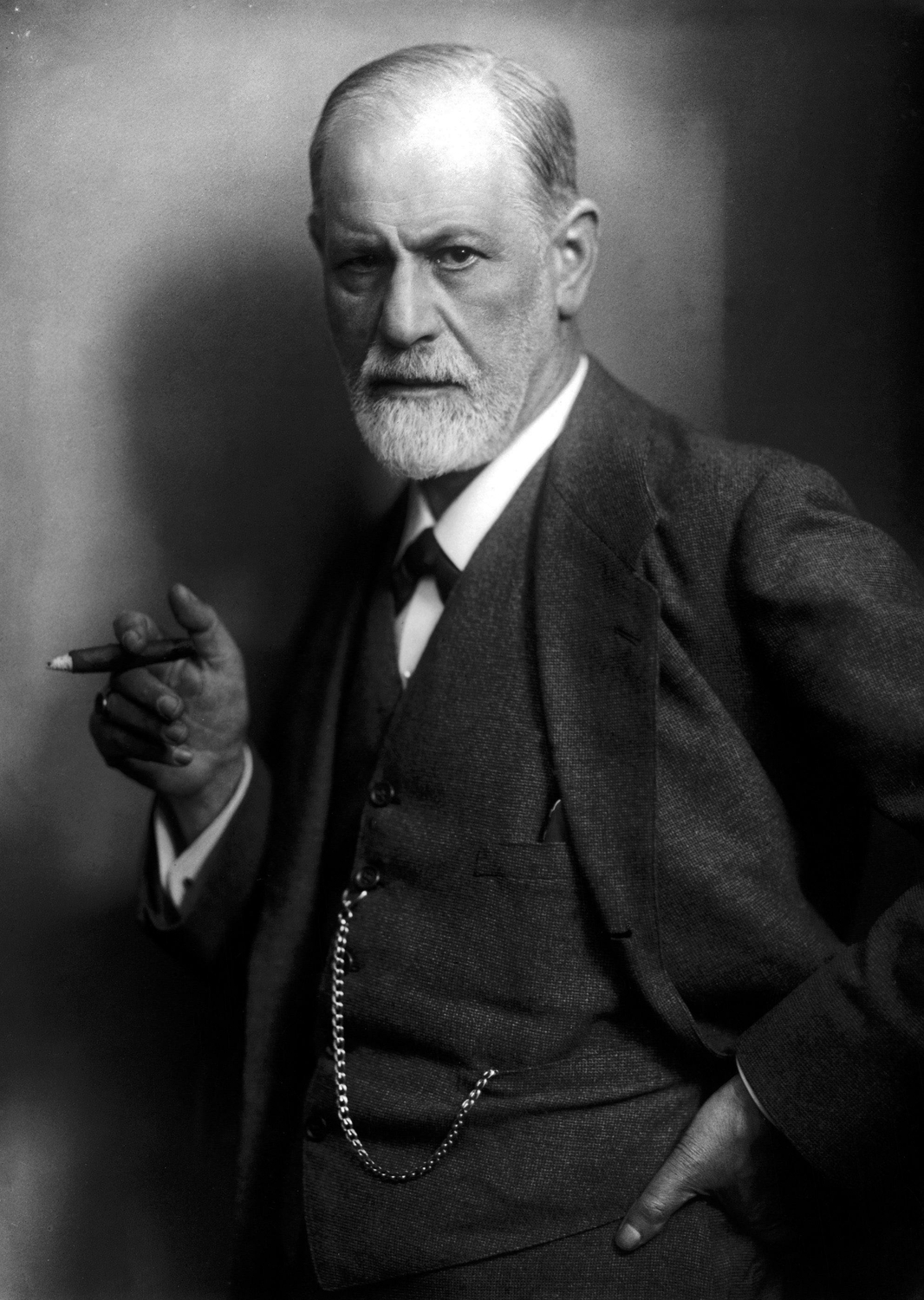
Sigmund Freud (1921)

=== Psychoanalysis ===
Psychoanalytic theory focuses on personality organization, specifically the dynamics of personality development. Sigmund Freud theorized that an infant's instinctual needs for food, security, and oral gratification are all satisfied by the mother. Through this process of gratification, the infant begins to desire the mother. This form of attachment is often referred to as cupboard love.

=== Behaviorism ===
The Behaviorism theory rose in popularity during the 20th century, as it had roots in science, focusing on objective observation and measured outcomes. The results were particularly influential in determining the future behaviors of infants.

Behaviorists similarly theorize that infants become attached to whoever satisfies their needs through conditioning. In this theory, any caregiver (often parents) can reinforce conditioning. Caregivers then become associated with gratification, and a feeling of security.

Pavlov's Dog

==== Classical conditioning ====
Classical conditioning is a theory of learning discovered by physiologist, Ivan Pavlov. It supports assumptions that form the foundation of behaviorism. These basic ideas suggest that all learning occurs through interactions within the environment, and that environment shapes behavior.

Various similarities exist between cupboard love and classical conditioning. Pavlov, known for Pavlov's dog experiment, discovered that his dog would salivate at the sound of a bell, associating the ringing with food. Eventually, the dog would salivate each time he heard the bell ring. When there was no food, the dog would still show affection to Pavlov in an attempt to be fed. Similarly, the cupboard love theory suggests that an infant will demonstrate characteristics perceived as affection and love towards the mother in order to be fed.

== Refrigerator mother versus cupboard love ==
Cupboard love is not to be confused with the term refrigerator mother. The refrigerator mother theory claimed that autism is caused by lack of maternal affection. This theory has been debunked by more current research on autism.

== Other uses of "cupboard love" ==
The term "cupboard love" is a British idiom, used most commonly in the United Kingdom. It describes the selfish, greedy or insincere affection displayed towards another person in order to get what they want. Pets are most frequently described as demonstrating cupboard love.

The term "cupboard-lover" refers to someone who will only profess their love, or act endearingly for the sake of gain from another person.
