= Bowlby baronets =

Baronetcy in the Baronetage of the United Kingdom

The Bowlby Baronetcy, of Manchester Square in the Borough of St Marylebone, is a title in the Baronetage of the United Kingdom. It was created on 17 July 1923 for the noted surgeon Anthony Bowlby. His eldest son, the second Baronet, was a Director of GKN. He died without male issue and was succeeded by his nephew, the third Baronet and (as of 2007) present holder of the title. He is the son of the developmental psychologist John Bowlby, second son of the first Baronet.

== Bowlby baronets, of Manchester Square (1923) ==
- Sir Anthony Alfred Bowlby, 1st Baronet (1855–1929)
- Sir Anthony Hugh Mostyn Bowlby, 2nd Baronet (1906–1993)
- Sir Richard Peregrine Longstaff Bowlby, 3rd Baronet (born 1941)

The heir apparent is the present holder's son Benjamin Bowlby (born 1966). His heir-in-line is his eldest son Roderick Peter Colyer Bowlby (born 1996).

== Arms ==
Coat of arms of Bowlby baronets
Crest Three annulets interlaced one and two Or between two thorn branches Proper. Escutcheon Per fess Sable and Argent a pale with three hinds erased two and one and as many annulets one and two all counterchanged. Motto Ne Cede Malis (Yield Not To Adversity)
