= Stella Chess =

American child psychiatrist

- Born: March 1, 1914; New York City, US
- Died: March 14, 2007 (aged 93); Manhattan, New York City, US
- Education: Ethical Culture School, Smith College, New York University School of Medicine
- Known for: Work on child temperaments and autism
- Spouse: Alexander Thomas
- Scientific career
- Fields: Child psychiatry
- Institutions: New York University

Stella Chess (March 1, 1914 – March 14, 2007) was an American child psychiatrist who taught at New York University (NYU). With her husband, Alexander Thomas, she undertook research into whether the temperaments of children are innate or are dependent on their nurturing. She also conducted studies on the potential links between rubella during pregnancy and autism in the child.

== Early life and education ==
The middle of three children, Chess was born in New York City to Russian immigrant parents. Her father was a lawyer and her mother was a schoolteacher. Chess graduated from the Ethical Culture School and Smith College. She then enrolled at New York University (NYU) School of Medicine in 1935, receiving her M.D. from there in 1939. While a student there, she took an elective with Lauretta Bender, which solidified her interest in child psychiatry and development.

== Career ==
Chess taught at New York Medical College after she received her M.D., and in 1954, she became the first professor of child psychology there. She first joined NYU in 1964, at the university's Bellevue Hospital Medical Center. In 1966, she became an associate professor of child psychiatry at NYU, and in 1970, she became a full professor there. She continued to teach at NYU into her 90s.

== Research ==
Chess was known for conducting the New York Longitudinal Study, which concluded that children's temperaments are determined before they are born, and not by the parenting they receive. This study, which she conducted with her husband, Alexander Thomas, also led to her developing a theory, which postulates that the interaction between a child's temperament and the personality of his or her parents can affect the child's mental health. Also on the basis of this study's results, Chess and Thomas categorized children into three categories based on their innate temperaments: "easy", "difficult", and "slow to warm up". She also conducted studies on the potential link between rubella and autism. In these studies, which were published in the 1970s, she found that children with congenital rubella syndrome developed autism at rates 200 times higher than the general population at the time.

== Death ==
Chess died in Manhattan on March 14, 2007. She was 93 years old. Her cause of death was pneumonia.
