= Thomas William Bowlby =

British journalist (1818–1860)

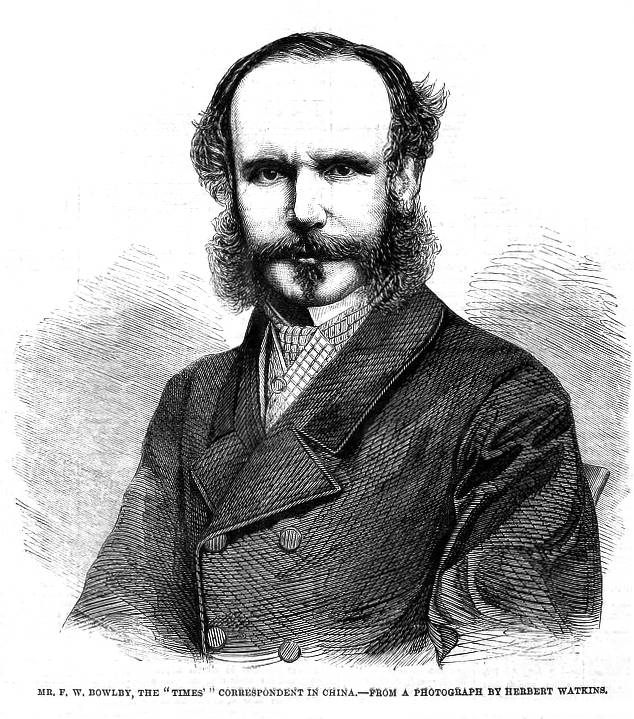
- Born: 7 January 1818; Gibraltar
- Died: 22 September 1860 (aged 42); Tongzhou District, Beijing, China
- Resting place: Andingmen, Beijing, China (Memorial Paddington Old Cemetery)
- Occupation: Journalist

Thomas William Bowlby (7 January 1818 – 22 September 1860) was a British correspondent for The Times in Germany and China in the 19th century. A "pioneer in the risky business of war reportage", his torture and death during the Second Opium War was a factor in the British and French decision to raze the Old Summer Palace (Yuanmingyuan) in Beijing.

== Early life ==
Born in Gibraltar, he was the son of Thomas Bowlby, a captain in the Royal Artillery, and Williamina Martha Arnold Balfour, daughter of Major-General William Balfour, a former Lieutenant-Governor of New Brunswick. Bowlby's parents moved while he was young to Sunderland, where his father became a timber merchant. Bowlby was educated by Dr Cowan, a Scottish school teacher living in Sunderland.

After finishing his schooling he trained as a solicitor under his cousin Russell Bowlby of Sunderland and on completion of his training he moved to London where spent some years as a salaried clerk to a law firm in The Temple. In 1846 he became junior partner to the firm of Lawrence, Crowdy and Bowlby. However, Bowlby found the law uncongenial and felt drawn to a career in writing.

== Career ==
Although he remained as a member of the firm of Lawrence, Crowdy and Bowlby until 1854, Bowlby went to Berlin as a special correspondent for The Times in 1848 to report on the revolutions occurring in Europe at the time.

In 1860, Bowlby was engaged to travel to China as the special correspondent of The Times to cover the Second Opium War, which was fought by the Chinese Qing Empire against the British and French. Lord Elgin and Baron Gros were his fellow passengers on the steamship SS Malabar, which sank in Galle harbour on 22 May 1860 after being beached in a severe storm. Bowlby's report of the shipwreck was considered one of his best pieces of work.

Bowlby's reports from China were informative and popular with readers of The Times. Whilst focusing on political and military developments, he also described many elements of local culture, such as gardening.

== Imprisonment and death ==
After the capture of Tientsin (Tianjin) on 23 August 1860, Bowlby accompanied the British envoys Henry Loch and Harry Smith Parkes and their escorts to Tungchow (present-day Tongzhou District, Beijing) to arrange a peace treaty with the Qing Empire. However, when the negotiations broke down, the Qing general Sengge Rinchen arrested Bowlby and the delegation.

Bowlby and the other captives were held at Tungchow and tortured, sometimes to death, over several days. Constricting ligatures were applied to their bodies; as they dried, they tightened. Those who cried out for water had dirt poured into their mouths. Bowlby died on 22 September.

In retaliation for the treatment of the delegation, the British and French burnt down the Qing Emperor's Old Summer Palace (Yuanmingyuan) in Beijing. Lord Elgin reportedly told a French commander "What would The Times say of me, if I did not avenge its correspondent?"

Bowlby's mangled body was retrieved later and buried in the Russian cemetery outside the Anding Gate of Beijing on 17 October 1860. He was survived by his widow and five young children, among whom included the surgeon Sir Anthony Alfred Bowlby.

== See also ==
- War correspondent

== Notes ==
=== References ===
- Bowlby, Ronald (18 June 2004). "A Times man in war-torn China". The Times.
- "Thomas William Bowlby". Oxford Dictionary of National Biography (online ed.). Oxford University Press. doi:10.1093/ref:odnb/3064. (Subscription, Wikipedia Library access or UK public library membership required.)
- Bowlby, Thomas William; C.C. Bowlby (1906). An Account of the Last Mission and Death of Thomas William Bowlby. Privately printed by C.C. Bowlby.
