= Internal working model of attachment =

Psychological approach

Internal working model of attachment is a psychological concept that describes the development of mental representations of the self’s worthiness and expectations of others’ responses. This model is a result of interactions with primary caregivers which become internalized, and is therefore an automatic process. John Bowlby implemented this model in his attachment theory in order to explain how infants act in accordance with these mental representations. It is an important aspect of general attachment theory.

Such internal working models guide future behavior as they generate expectations of how attachment figures will respond to one's behavior. For example, a parent rejecting the child's need for care conveys that close relationships should be avoided in general, resulting in maladaptive attachment styles.

== Influences ==
The most influential figure for the idea of the internal working model of attachment is Bowlby, who laid the groundwork for the concept in the 1960s. He was inspired by both psychoanalysis, especially object relations theory, and more recent research into ethology, evolution and information-processing.

In psychoanalytic theory, there has been the idea of an inner or representational world (proposed by Freud) as well as the internalization of relationships (Fairbairn, Winnicott). According to Freud, early schemata evolve from experiences of need fulfilment through the attachment figure. He argued that the resulting mental representation is an internal copy of the external world made up from memories, and thinking serves the role of experimental action. Fairbairn and Winnicott proposed that these early patterns of relationships become internalized and govern future relationships.

However, the ethological-evolutionary aspects of the theory received more attention. Bowlby was interested in separation distress, and bonding in animals. He noticed that many infant behaviours are organized around the goal of maintaining proximity to the caregiver. He proposed that human infants like other mammals must have an attachment motivational-behavioural system which enhances chances for survival. Ainsworth observed mother-infant interaction and came to the conclusion that individual differences in reaction to separation could not be explained by simple absence or presence of the caregiver but must be the result of a cognitive process.

However, when Bowlby developed his attachment theory, cognitive psychology was still at its beginning. Only in 1967, Neisser proposed a theory of mental representation based on schemas which later led to the development of schema theory. It was said that these scripts might be the base of the structure of internal working models.

The term internal working model, however, was coined quite early by Craik (1943). What he called internal working model was a more elaborate and modern version of the psychoanalytical idea of the internal world. In essence, he claimed that humans carry a small-scale representation, or model of reality, and their own potential actions within it in their mind.

In summary, Bowlby remodelled Freud’s work about relationship development in terms of newer fields of research (evolutionary biology, ethology, information-processing theory), drawing both from Craik’s idea of representations as the formation and use of dynamic models and Piaget’s theory of cognitive development.

== Function ==
There are several hypothesized functions of an internal working model of attachment, both in terms of its evolutionary origins and inherent functioning.

Bowlby proposed that proximity-seeking behaviour evolved out of selection pressure. In the context of survival, a healthy internal working model helps the infant to maintain proximity to their caregiver in the face of threat or danger. This is especially important for species with prolonged periods of development, like humans. Due to the relative immaturity of the infant at birth, offspring that manages to maintain a close relationship to their caregiver by seeking their proximity has a survival advantage. A close emotional bond to the caregiver is therefore crucial for protection from physical harm, and thus the internal working model mediates attachment. This regulation is enforced via a motivational-behaviour system, motivating both infant and caregiver to seek proximity. Specifically, caregiving is regulated by behavioural processes complementary to the infant’s proximity-seeking, e.g. the baby smiles, the adult feels reward as a result.

Having an adequate internal model or representation of the self and the caregiver also serves the adaptive function of ensuring appropriate interpretation and prediction of, as well as response to the environment. Craik especially emphasized that those organisms that are capable of forming complex internal working models have higher chances of survival. The better the internal working model can simulate reality, the better the individual’s capacity to plan and respond. According to Bowlby, individuals form both models of the world and the self within it. These models, initially the product of specific experiences of reality, then aid future attention to and perception and interpretation of the world, which in turn creates certain expectations about possible future events, allowing foresightful and appropriate behaviour. Hence, having adequate representations of the self and caregivers serves an adaptive function. Infants absorb all sorts of complex social-emotional information from the social interactions that they observe. They notice the helpful and hindering behaviours of one person to another. From these observations they develop expectations of how two characters should behave, known as a "secure base script." These scripts provide as a template of how attachment related events should unfold and they are the building blocks of ones internal working models.

Lastly, if the infant can be sure about the availability of the attachment figure, it will be less prone to fear due to the supportive presence or secure base function of the caregiver, which makes exploration of the environment and hence learning possible. This felt security is the primary goal of all working models. Ainsworth researched the secure base phenomenon in her strange situation procedure in which an infant uses their mother as a secure base. The attachment system provides the child with a sense of security in the form of this base, which supports exploration of the environment and hence independence. A securely attached child will, in turn, achieve a balance between intimacy and independence. This corresponds to a balance between the attachment system which serves the function of protection and the exploration system which facilitates learning.

The function of other attachment styles can be explained in terms of an imbalance of intimacy and independence, a preoccupation with one of these goals. This overriding chronic goal is intimacy in preoccupied children, independence or self-protection in dismissive children, and in case of the fearful child, there is a conflicting chronic goal of achieving both intimacy and independence at the same time or an approach-avoidance conflict due to relative inflexibility in comparison to secure attachment.

The internal working model functions largely outside of conscious awareness. Those subconscious aspects might be especially important for the function of self-protection and serve as a defence mechanism in the face of contradicting models, where one of them operates within the subconscious to prevent a threat to the self. This is mostly the case for dismissive-avoidant attachment where conflicting ideas of the caregiver as both loving and neglecting cause the defence mechanism of downplaying the need for intimacy, not relying on the attachment figure, and emphasizing independence. For example, if a caregiver is accepting of a baby's proximity-seeking behaviours and grants access, the baby is thought to develop a secure organization. If the caregiver consistently denies the infant access, an avoidant organization develops; and if the caregiver inconsistently grants access, an ambivalent organization develops. In retrospect, internal working models are constant with and reflect the primary relationship with our caregivers. Childhood attachment directly influences our adult relationships.

A parent's internal working model that is operative in the attachment relationship with her infant can be accessed by examining the parent's mental representations. Recent research has demonstrated that the quality of maternal attributions as markers of maternal mental representations can be associated with particular forms of maternal psychopathology and can be altered in a relative short time-period by targeted psychotherapeutic intervention.

== Types ==
Infants develop different types of internal working models dependent on two factors: the responsiveness and accessibility of the parent and the worthiness of the self to be loved and supported. Thus, by the age of three years, infants will have developed several expectations about how attachment figures will react to their need for help and start to evaluate how likely the self is worth of support in general. These internalized representations of the self, of attachment figures, and of relationships are constructed as a result of experiences with primary caregivers. It guides the individual’s expectations about relationships throughout life, subsequently influencing social behavior, perception of others and development of self-esteem.

Essentially, four different internal working models can be defined which are based on positive or negative images of self and others. Children who feel securely attached seek their parent as a secure base and are willing to explore their environment. In adulthood, they hold a positive model of self and others, therefore, feeling comfortable with intimacy and autonomy. On the contrary, adults who develop a fearful-avoidant internal working model (negative self, negative others) construct defense mechanisms in order to protect themselves from being rejected by others. Consequently, they avoid intimate relationships. The third category is classified as the preoccupied model, indicating a combination of negative self-evaluation and the appreciation of others, which makes them overly dependent on their environment. Finally, dismissive-avoidant adults aim for independence as they view themselves as valuable and autonomous. They rarely open up and mainly rely on themselves due to lack of trust in others.

Type	Description	Model of self	Dependence	Model of other	Avoidance
Secure	comfortable with intimacy and independence	positive	low	positive	low
Fearful	fearful of intimacy, avoidant	negative	high	negative	high
Preoccupied	preoccupied with intimacy	negative	high	positive	low
Dismissing	dismissing of intimacy, counter-dependent	positive	low	negative	high

== Development ==
Internal working models are considered to result out of generalized representations of past events between attachment figure and the child. Thus, in forming an internal working model a child takes into account past experiences with the caregiver as well as the outcomes of past attempts to establish contact with the caregiver. One important factor in the establishment of generalized representations is caregiver behaviour. Accordingly, a child whose caretaker exhibits high levels of parental sensitivity, responsiveness and reliability is likely to develop a positive internal working model of the self. Conversely, frequent experiences of unreliability and neglect by the attachment figure foster the emergence of negative internal working models of self and others.

As infants have been shown to possess the social and cognitive capacities necessary to form internal working models, initial development of these may occur within the first year of life. Once established, internal working models are assumed to remain largely consistent over time, developing primarily in complexity and sophistication. As such, internal working models of young children may include representations of past instances of caregiver responsiveness or availability, while older children's and adults' internal working models may integrate more advanced cognitive abilities such as the imagination of hypothetical future interactions. However, changes to internal representations of attachment relationships can occur. This is most likely to happen upon repeated experiences that are incompatible with the internal working model in place at the time. One way this can happen is during major periods (meaning weeks or months) of absence of the attachment figure. During such prolonged absence, a child's expectation of the caregiver's availability to respond is continuously violated. This results in a change of behaviour toward the caregiver upon reunion, reflecting changes in the child's internal working model of the relationship. Additionally, recent research suggests that early attachment disruptions can contribute to the formation of persistent “limiting beliefs” about self-worth and safety, which influence identity development and patterns of emotional regulation into adulthood.

== Intergenerational transmission ==
Internal working models are subject to intergenerational transmission, meaning that parents' internal working model patterns may be passed on to their children. Indeed, high correlations have been found between security of early infant attachment and parental internal working model security. A central aspect in intergenerational transmission of internal working models is that caretakers themselves are influenced in their behaviour toward children by their own internal working models. For instance, a parent with a secure and consistent internal working model is likely to interpret an infant's attachment signals appropriately, whereas a parent with an insecure internal working model is less likely to do so. In the latter case, the infant itself might be drawn to construct a negative working model of the self and the relationship. Furthermore, a parent with a negative, poorly organized and inconsistent working model might fail to provide useful feedback about the parent-infant dyad and other relationships, thus disrupting the infant's forming of a well-adapted working model at an early stage. The result will be a negative, disorganized internal working model employed by the infant.

One mechanism by which attachment (and thus, internal working models of attachment) can be transmitted is joint reminiscing about past events or memories. For instance, mothers who are securely attached tend to communicate about past events in more elaborate ways than do mothers who are not securely attached. While reminiscing together about past events, securely attached mothers will then engage in more elaborate reasoning with their child, thereby stimulating the development of a more elaborate, coherent internal working model by the child itself.
