= Anthony Bowlby =

English surgeon (1855–1929)

Major-General Sir Anthony Bowlby Bt KCB KCMG KCVO FRCS
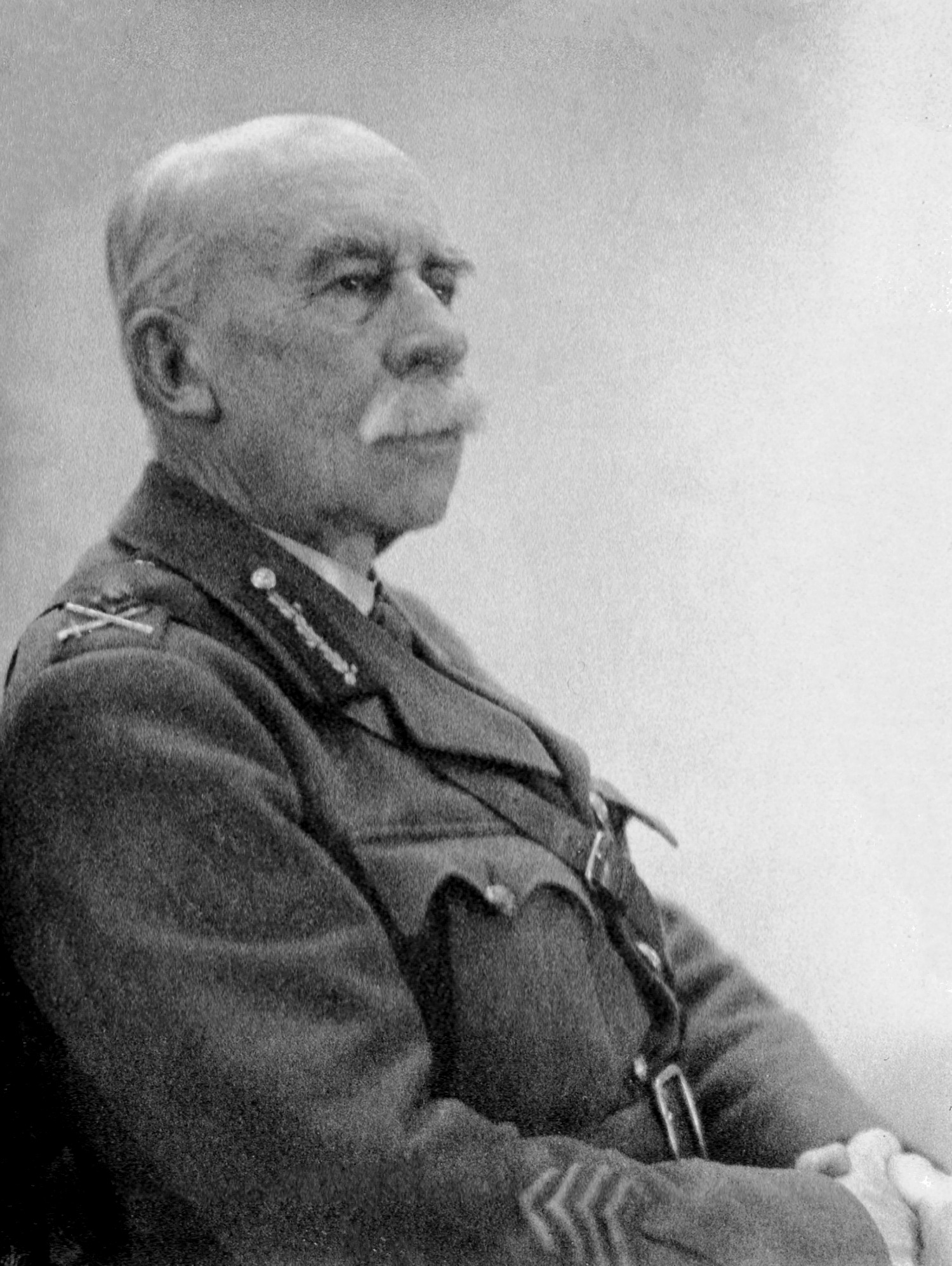
- Sir Anthony Bowlby as a Major-General
- Born: Anthony Alfred Bowlby; 10 May 1855; Namur, Belgium
- Died: 7 April 1929 (aged 73); Lyndhurst, Hampshire
- Military career
- Allegiance: United Kingdom
- Branch: British Army
- Service years: 1899-1900; 1914–1918
- Rank: Major-General
- Conflicts: Second Boer War; First World War
- Awards: Knight Commander of the Order of the Bath, Knight Commander of the Order of St Michael and St George, Knight Commander of the Royal Victorian Order

Sir Anthony Alfred Bowlby, 1st Baronet KCB KCMG KCVO FRCS (10 May 1855 – 7 April 1929) was a British Army officer, surgeon and pathologist.

== Early life ==
Anthony Bowlby was born in Namur, Belgium, the third son of Thomas William Bowlby (1818–1860) and Frances Marion Bowlby nee Mein, the daughter of an army surgeon. In 1860 Bowlby's father, a correspondent to The Times, died in captivity in China.

Anthony was educated at Durham School and St Bartholomew's Hospital, London (1876), qualifying as a Member of the Royal College of Surgeons in 1879.

== Career ==
In 1880 he was appointed House Surgeon at St Bartholomew's, was promoted to Surgical Registrar to the Hospital and Demonstrator of Practical Surgery in 1884, then to Assistant Surgeon and in 1903 to full Surgeon. During the Second Boer War (1899–1900) he served as a medical officer in South Africa at the Portland Field Hospital, Bloemfontein, after which he was invested as a Companion of the Order of St Michael and St George

He was Surgeon to King Edward VII's Household between 1904 and 1910 and Honorary Surgeon-in-Ordinary to King George V in 1910. He was made a Knight Bachelor in 1911.

He served in France in the First World War as Consulting Surgeon to the Forces, with the rank of Major-General, Army Medical Services and towards the end of the war became Adviser on Surgery for the whole of the British area, Front and Base. His main achievement was the development of Casualty Clearing Stations into quasi hospitals carrying out major surgery.

In 1904, he was listed honorary medical staff at King Edward VII's Hospital for Officers. He served as a Councillor of the Royal College of Surgeons of England from 1904 until 1920, when he became President for three years. He delivered the Bradshaw Lecture in 1915 on the subject of "Wounds in War" and gave the Hunterian Oration in 1919. After serving as President, in the 1923 Birthday Honours he was created a baronet, of Manchester Square, in the Baronetage of the United Kingdom.

He had been made a Knight Commander of the Order of the Bath in the 1919 Birthday Honours.

Bowlby was appointed a Knight Commander of the Order of St Michael and St George (KCMG) in 1915 in recognition of meritorious service during the war. He was further appointed a Knight Commander of the Royal Victorian Order (KCVO) in the 1916 New Year Honours.

== Personal life ==
As a young man, Bowlby reportedly decided to delay marriage in order to take care of his widowed mother until her death.

In 1898 he married Maria Bridget Mostyn, the daughter of Canon the Hon. Hugh Wynne Mostyn. The couple had three sons and three daughters.

He died on holiday at Stoney Cross, Lyndhurst, on 7 April 1929, was cremated at Brookwood, and buried at Brooklands Cemetery.

He was succeeded as Baronet by his eldest son, Anthony Hugh Mostyn Bowlby.

== Honours and arms ==
- Fellow of the Royal College of Surgeons, 1881
- Knight Bachelor, 1911
- K.C.M.G., 1915
- K.C.V.O., 1916
- K.C.B, 1919
- D.S.M. (U.S.), 1919
- President of the Royal College of Surgeons 1920–23.
- Honorary D.C.L., Durham University, 1923.

He was created 1st Baronet Bowlby, of Manchester Square, Borough of St. Marylebone [U.K.] on 17 July 1923.

Coat of arms of Anthony Bowlby
Crest Three annulets interlaced one and two Or between two thorn branches Proper. Escutcheon Per fess Sable and Argent a pale with three hinds erased two and one and as many annulets one and two all counterchanged. Motto Ne Cede Malis (Yield Not To Adversity)

== Publications ==
- Surgical Pathology and Morbid Anatomy, 16mo, London, 1887.
- Injuries and Diseases of Nerves and their Surgical Treatment, 8vo, 20 plates. London, 1889; Philadelphia, 1890.
- A Civilian War Hospital, with Cuthbert Sidney Wallace, being an account of the work of the Portland Hospital and of experience of wounds and sickness in South Africa, 1900 (etc.), 8vo, 50 plates, London, 1901.

Baronetage of the United Kingdom
New creation	Baronet (of Manchester Square); 1923–1929	Succeeded by Anthony Hugh Bowlby
