= Lauren Slater =

American psychologist

- Born: March 21, 1963 (age 63)
- Education: Brandeis University (BA); Harvard University (MA); Boston University (EdD)
- Occupations: Psychotherapist, writer
- Notable work: Opening Skinner's Box; Lying: A Metaphorical Memoir; Prozac Diary

Lauren Slater (born March 21, 1963) is an American psychotherapist and writer. She is the author of nine books, including Welcome To My Country (1996), Prozac Diary (1998), and Lying: A Metaphorical Memoir (2000). Her 2004 book Opening Skinner's Box: Great Psychological Experiments of the Twentieth Century, a description of psychology experiments "narrated as stories," has drawn both praise and criticism. Criticism has focused on Slater's research methods and on the extent to which some of the experiences she describes may have been fictionalized.

The Village Voice called her "the closest thing we have to a doyenne of psychiatric disorder."

== Education and career ==
Slater graduated in 1985 from Brandeis University. Slater was a 2002–2003 Knight Science Journalism Fellow at the Massachusetts Institute of Technology.

After the birth of her daughter, Slater wrote her memoir Love Works Like This, to chronicle the decisions she made related to her psychiatric illness and her pregnancy. In a 2003 BBC Woman's Hour radio interview, and in a 2005 article in Child Magazine, Slater spoke about depression during pregnancy and the risks to the woman and her baby.

== Opening Skinner's Box ==
Opening Skinner's Box was described by Scott Lilienfeld as "one of the first major books to bridge the gap between academic and popular psychology." In a 2004 literary review, Farhad Manjoo, a writer for Salon.com, observed that it was "a genuinely compelling read".

The book describes—in the form of stories, complete with characters, plot, and emotional insights—the 10 psychology experiments Slater regards as the most significant or interesting of the 20th century. These include B.F. Skinner's work on behaviorism; Stanley Milgram's demonstration of how ordinary people can be influenced to obey authority; David Rosenhan's 1972 experiment in which eight people feigned mental illness then gained admittance to psychiatric hospitals; Harry Harlow's experiments with monkeys and motherhood; and Bruce K. Alexander's Rat Park, where laboratory rats addicted to morphine turned the drug down when given a better life.

=== Criticism ===
Some have disputed quotations she has used, or have criticized her understanding of the studies she wrote about.

Slater's attorney has responded to the criticism by accusing some psychiatrists and psychologists of having mounted a "vindictive effort" and "vendetta" against her, and of "sniping" at her on Amazon.com.

David Corfield, a philosopher of mathematics writing in The Guardian, questions the veracity of the book's reported speech. He relates how, during Slater's discussion with Harvard University psychologist Jerome Kagan, she recalled how Kagan had suddenly dived under his desk to illustrate a point about free will. However, Kagan told Corfield that he had not done this but only suggested that he could do so if he wanted.

In response to Corfield's criticism, Slater showed the New York Times an e-mail she received from Kagan, who was responding to a pre-publication fact-checking list she had sent him. Slater had written: "3. that, in demonstrating to me that people do, indeed, have free will, you jumped under your desk", and Kagan responded: "I was trying to demonstrate that when humans have a choice of actions, they can select an act that has never been rewarded in the past".

Slater repeated several variants of the urban legend that B.F. Skinner raised his daughter Deborah in an operant conditioning chamber and subjected her to psychological experiments, resulting in psychosis that led her to sue her father and ultimately commit suicide. Although Slater's book stated that the rumors were false, Slater also allowed the reader to believe that Deborah had disappeared. Deborah Skinner publicly responded that she was not insane, dead, or difficult to contact.

Farhad Manjoo protested on Salon.com that Buzan's Guardian article "reads as if she has never even picked up Slater's book", observing that "Slater's description of the box is pretty much in line with Buzan's description in the Guardian".

Another criticism concerned Slater's description of her reaction to the David Rosenhan study. Slater wrote that she had repeated Rosenhan's research, in which he trained students to pretend to be mentally ill to gauge the reactions of psychiatric hospitals, by presenting herself at the emergency rooms of multiple hospitals with a single auditory hallucination to see whether she would be admitted as a psychiatric patient. She said that she was not admitted but was given prescriptions for antipsychotics and antidepressants.

This has been questioned by a number of psychiatrists and psychologists, including Robert Spitzer of the New York State Psychiatric Institute. Slater replied through her attorney that she considered her work to be an "anecdote, not systematic research, and certainly not a 'replication' of Rosenhan's study". Slater's attorney accused Spitzer of being involved in a campaign to discredit Slater's work.

== Blue Dreams ==
Slater's 2018 book, Blue Dreams: The Science and the Story of the Drugs that Changed Our Minds, examines the history of psychopharmacology through the lens of her own experience as a patient. She writes with evident respect for the drugs that have permitted her to live stably and fruitfully, but she candidly discusses their limitations and side effects as well. She traces the evolution of psychiatric medicines, and argues that they need to be developed and administered with more art than science. She describes the key roles played by imagination and empathy in effective psychiatric treatment. Author Lidija Haas, in a review for Harper's Magazine, commented, "if Slater has any discernible bias, it's in favor of human connection".

== Awards and honors ==
Opening Skinner's Box was named "Dynamite - the most explosive book" of 2005 by Bild Der Wissenschaft and was nominated for a Los Angeles Times Kirsch award for science and technology writing.

Slater's work has been included in Best American Essays three times. In 2006, Slater was chosen to be Guest Editor of the Best American Essay series.

== Publications ==
=== Books ===
- (1997) Welcome to My Country, Anchor, ISBN 0-385-48739-8
- (1998) Prozac Diary, Random House, ISBN 0-679-45721-6
- (2000) Lying: A Metaphorical Memoir, Random House (US), ISBN 0-375-50112-6
- (2003) Love Works Like This: Travels Through a Pregnant Year, Bloomsbury Publishing plc, ISBN 0-7475-6217-2
- (2004) Opening Skinner's Box: Great Psychology Experiments of the Twentieth Century, W. W. Norton & Company, ISBN 0-393-05095-5
- (2005) Blue Beyond Blue: Extraordinary Tales for Ordinary Dilemmas, W.W. Norton & Company, ISBN 0-393-05959-6
- (2012) The $60,000 Dog: My Life with Animals, Beacon Press, ISBN 978-0-8070-0187-5
- (2013) Playing House: Notes of a Reluctant Mother, Beacon Press, ISBN 978-0-8070-0173-8
- (2018) Blue Dreams: The Science and the Story of the Drugs that Changed Our Minds, Little, Brown & Company, ISBN 0316370649

=== Anthology contributions ===
- (1994) "Striptease" in The Best American Essays 1994 (anthology), Houghton Mifflin Company, ISBN 0-395-69254-7
- (1997) "Black Swans" in The Best American Essays 1997 (anthology), Houghton Mifflin Company, ISBN 0-395-85695-7
- (2002) "Dr. Daedalus" in The Best American Science Writing 2002 (anthology), HarperCollins Publishers, ISBN 0-06-093650-9

=== Articles ===
- "Welcome To My Country," The Missouri Review, Spring 1995
- "Black Swans," The Missouri Review, Spring 1996
- "Parents help babies learn lessons of love". Deseret News (Salt Lake City). March 27, 2003. Archived from the original on April 30, 2010 – via FindArticles.
- "The Value Of Repression," The New York Times Magazine, March 2003
- "Living In An Age Of Anxiety," Self Magazine, April 2004
- "Milgram's Obedience Studies," The Guardian Magazine, April 2004
- "Rosenhan's Pseudopatient Experiment," The London Times, April 2004
- Slater, Lauren (November 2, 2003). "The Cruelest Cure". The New York Times.
- "The Life Of Katrina Dalton," The New York Times Magazine, January 2005
- "Cognitive Dissonance: The Work Of Leon Festinger," Die Welt, August 2005
- "Who Holds The Clicker?", Mother Jones Magazine, Nov/Dec 2005
- "Our Stone," The Missouri Review, Summer 2006
- "Beyond the Valley of the Dolls," Elle, July 2007
