= Opening Skinner's Box =

Book by Lauren Slater

Opening Skinner's Box: Great Psychological Experiments of the Twentieth Century (W. W. Norton & Company, 2004, ISBN 0393050955), is a book by Lauren Slater.

In this book, Slater sets out to describe some of the psychological experiments of the twentieth century. Controversially, the author also describes the urban legend that B.F. Skinner raised his child in his Skinner box, a kind of Operant conditioning chamber, in a way which many perceived as being poorly researched and lending credit to a false claim.

== Experiments covered ==
- The work and experiments of B. F. Skinner
- The Milgram experiment of the 1950s, a controversial experiment designed to explain obedience to authority to a post-Holocaust world
- The Rosenhan experiment, which questioned the validity of psychiatric diagnosis in the 1970s
- Darley and Latané's helping behavior studies
- Leon Festinger's theory of Cognitive dissonance among cult members whose predicted apocalypse fails to arrive
- Rat Park, a study into drug addiction conducted by Canadian psychologist Bruce K. Alexander in the late 1970s, which attempted to show that drugs do not cause addiction by demonstrating that the apparent addiction to opiate drugs commonly observed in laboratory rats exposed to it is attributable to their living conditions, and not to any addictive property of the drug itself
- The misinformation effect, discovered by Elizabeth Loftus, which gave rise to the lost in the mall technique
- Harry Harlow, an American psychologist best known for his maternal-separation and social isolation experiments on rhesus monkeys, which demonstrated the importance of care-giving and companionship in social and cognitive development
- António Egas Moniz and his development of lobotomy
- Eric Kandel, who identified CREB as a protein involved in long-term memory

== Controversy ==
B. F. Skinner's daughter Deborah criticised the book for its claims that she had been raised in a box and committed suicide. The book, indeed, mentioned such claims, but also rebutted them with an interview with Deborah's sister, Julie Vargas. In an article for The Guardian, Deborah described the claims as "doing her family a disservice" and stated that she was a very healthy child growing up. Skinner's daughter also described the truth behind the photographs which spawned the legend, namely that her father had developed a heated crib for her, later marketed under the name "Air-Crib", which had been mistaken by the public for a Skinner box.
