= Chasing the Scream =

2015 book by Johann Hari

Chasing the Scream: The First and Last Days of the War on Drugs
- First edition (UK)
- Author: Johann Hari
- Language: English
- Subject: Drug control, drug trafficking
- Genre: Nonfiction
- Publisher: Bloomsbury
- Publication date: 15 January 2015 (U.K.); 20 January 2015 (U.S.)
- Publication place: United Kingdom; United States
- Media type: Print (Hardback)
- Pages: 389 pages
- ISBN: 978-1-62040-890-2
- OCLC: 881418255
- LC Class: HV5825.H234
- Website: https://chasingthescream.com/

Chasing the Scream: The First and Last Days of the War on Drugs is a book by Johann Hari examining the history and impact of drug criminalisation, collectively known as "the war on drugs". The book was published simultaneously in the United Kingdom and United States in January 2015. It inspired the 2021 film The United States vs. Billie Holiday. In the UK later editions of the book are titled Chasing the Scream: The Search for the Truth About Addiction.

== Background and summary ==
In January 2012, Hari announced on his website that he was writing his first book, a study of the "war on drugs".

The release of the book coincided with the 100th anniversary of the Harrison Narcotics Tax Act in the United States, which was the world's first drug control legislation when it passed in December 1914. In Chasing the Scream, Hari writes that two global wars began in 1914: World War I, which lasted four years, and the war on drugs, which is ongoing.

In the introduction to the book, Hari writes that one of his first memories was of trying and failing to wake up a relative from a "drugged slump", and that he has always felt "oddly drawn to addicts and recovering addicts—they feel like my tribe, my group, my people". He also discusses his history of abusing anti-narcolepsy medication, a class of prescription drugs sometimes taken by people without the disease in order to stay alert.

Hari questions whether or not he is an addict and decides to go searching for answers to questions he has. "Why did the drug war start, and why does it continue? Why can some people use drugs without any problems, while others can't? What really causes addiction? What happens if you choose a radically different policy?"

Hari writes that he spent the next three years in search of answers, traveling across nine countries (United States, Canada, Great Britain, Mexico, Portugal, Switzerland, Sweden, Uruguay and Vietnam).

He profiles early figures in the drug war like jazz musician Billie Holiday, a long-time heroin addict; racketeer Arnold Rothstein, an early drug trafficker; and Harry J. Anslinger, the first commissioner of the Federal Bureau of Narcotics (who had a daily morphine habit).

He also interviews drug addicts, dealers, police and lawmakers today, as well as scientists, drug addiction specialists and drug reform advocates like Danny Kushlick and Steve Rolles, as well as João Goulão, a doctor who has helped steer Portugal's drug policy.

One of his interviewees is Bruce K. Alexander, the researcher behind the "Rat Park" drug addiction experiments done in the 1970s. Alexander's hypothesis is that drugs themselves do not cause addiction, which is largely in contrast to current popular beliefs about drugs and drug addiction.

Hari writes, "Many of our most basic assumptions about this subject are wrong. Drugs are not what we think they are. Drug addiction is not what we have been told it is. The drug war is not what our politicians have sold it as for one hundred years and counting."

=== Source documentation ===
In 2011, Hari was caught plagiarising quotes and misrepresenting them as direct speech from interviews he conducted. This raised questions about the credibility of his writing. An introductory page of Chasing the Scream states that audio files of all quotes in the book from Hari's interviews are available online at the book's official website. On the site, it states that there are more than 400 quotes spoken to Hari appearing in the book: "To be as transparent as possible, they are posted on this website – so as you read the book, you can listen the voices of the people in it, as they tell their stories for themselves." The book also includes 60 pages of explanatory notes on sources and interviews.

The website includes a section for questions and corrections, with a note from Hari asking readers to submit any factual errors in the book to be corrected "for future editions and for the record". This section includes a few transcription errors from recorded interviews that were not noticed until after publication; for example, a quote from Bruce K. Alexander saying "learning to deal with the modern age” was incorrectly transcribed and printed in the book as "learning to live with the modern age".

Author and anti-plagiarism campaigner Jeremy Duns criticised instances where quotes were inaccurately transcribed or misrepresented, stating that out of a sample of dozens of clips, "in almost all cases, words in quotes had been changed or omitted without being noted, often for no apparent purpose, but in several cases to subtly change the narrative."

In a review for New Matilda, Michael Brull expressed reservations about Hari's citational practices and highlighted contradictions between the book's narrative and a 2009 article by Hari.

== Book reception ==
=== Critical response ===
Chasing the Scream has received mostly positive reviews from critics and journalists.

Kate Tuttle of the Boston Globe called it a "passionate, timely book" and that through reading the stories of Hari's interview subjects, including drug addicts, drug dealers, scientists and politicians, "their combined testimony forms a convincing brief that drug prohibition may have spawned as much crime, violence, and heartache as drug use ever did".

Reviewer Nick Romeo of The Christian Science Monitor wrote that "Hari debunks many myths and fallacies surrounding addiction and the drug wars" and that the book is "an eloquent reminder" that drug addicts are humans.

Ed Vulliamy called the book a "righteous assault" and a "long-awaited history" on the war on drugs, "which imprisons millions and persecutes more". He was critical that the book omitted two crucial aspects of the situation – the first being how the "war" is in reality one waged against addicts and not those who financially profit from drugs, and the second concerning details of how legalisation of drugs would work in practicality. Vulliamy concluded that omission of these aspects does not detract "from the book’s argument, or the righteous movement of which Hari is an estimable spokesman". He noted the author's 2011 scandal, writing that a "shamed" Hari left to dedicate himself to documenting the war on drugs and that Chasing the Scream "is the prodigal fruit of that work, and with it redemption, if that was needed."

In his review for The Guardian, John Harris praised parts of the book but was negative overall. He wrote that although the work is a "powerful contribution to an urgent debate" on drug policy, Hari employs a "gauche journalistic equivalent of the narrative voice found in Mills & Boon novels". Harris also questioned why "a mere 52 words" are printed from Hari's interview with Dr. Robert DuPont, the first director of the U.S. National Institute on Drug Abuse and the keynote speaker at a World Federation Against Drugs conference Hari attended. Harris also admitted Hari's past record presents a challenge to reviewers, and made him more skeptical over things such as the DuPont interview, writing, "though it might be nice to set aside the events of 2011 and allow him a fresh start, his misdemeanours inevitably colour your experience of the book".

Hugo Rifkind wrote in his review for The Times that it is "tempting, albeit petty, to read Chasing the Scream less as a book and more as an act of rehabilitation". Rifkind ultimately called it "thoughtful, thorough and questing, and full of fresh and genuine reportage about aspects of the drug economy".

Kirkus Reviews praised the book, calling Hari "a sharp judge of character" and that the book is "a compassionate and humane argument to overturn draconian drug policies".

In 2018 Joe Muggs writing for The Quietus Muggs characterizes Chasing The Scream's claims about addiction as shallow and pseudoscientific. Muggs also criticized Hari's use of celebrity blurbs to rehabilitate his image.

=== Expert response ===
David Nutt, an English psychiatrist and neuropsychopharmacologist specialising in drug research, wrote a positive review of Chasing the Scream for The Evening Standard. He praised Hari's research into the early events of anti-drug laws, some of which, Nutt noted, he himself had forgotten ever occurred. He called the personal stories of those affected the most "horrific", writing "The lack of evidence of the war having worked, alongside massive evidence of failure, are detailed with a frightening clarity". Nutt, the former chief scientific advisor on drugs to the British government, concluded, "Read it and demand our politicians take note!"

Seth Mnookin, professor of science writing at MIT, wrote in his New York Times review that Hari is "in over his head" when writing about the current science of addiction: "[H]is misunderstanding of some of the basic principles of scientific research — that anecdotes are not data; that a conclusion is not a fact — transforms what had been an affecting jeremiad into a partisan polemic". Mnookin also characterises Hari's historical account of the early prohibition of drugs as "forced". In contrast, Mnookin's assessment of Hari's discussions of current events is generally quite positive.

== See also ==
- Drug liberalisation
- Drug prohibition law
