= Effect of psychoactive drugs on animals =

Psychoactive drugs, such as alcohol, amphetamine, caffeine, cannabis, chloral hydrate, IBMX, lysergic acid diethylamide (LSD), mescaline, theophylline, and others, have been studied on certain animals.

It is believed that plants developed caffeine as a chemical defense against insects.

== Fish ==
=== Nile Tilapia ===
A study conducted by the Aquaculture Institute looked into the effects of cannabis oil on the metabolism and immune system of the Nile tilapia (Oreochromis niloticus). They found that cannabis has no measurable effect on the white blood cell count or plasma protein concentration, and therefore has no effect on the immune system of the Nile tilapia. However, the tilapia that were fed food pellets laced with THC demonstrated a higher food conversion rate. This higher food conversion rate lead researchers to believe that THC increases the metabolic rate of Nile tilapia.

=== Zebrafish ===
Zebrafish have long acted as a model for humans to test the effects of various psychoactive substances. One study conducted by the Research Society on Alcoholism concluded that when given a moderate dose of ethanol, zebrafish became more active and swam faster. When the dose of alcohol increased, the zebrafish became sluggish. Another study by the same institute found that when a "drunk" (blood alcohol concentration of over 0.1) zebrafish is introduced to a group of sober ones, the sober fish will follow the drunk individual as their leader.

In a study testing the effects of THC on memory in zebrafish, researchers found that THC impairs spatial memory but has no effect on associative memory. Zebrafish were able to remember color patterns associated with them getting fed after being put under the influence of THC, but were unable to remember the spatial pattern associated with them getting fed after being put under the influence of THC.

Zebrafish have also been used to test the medicinal benefits of certain psychoactive drugs, particularly how they can be used to treat mental health problems. A study looking into the antidepressant properties of ketamine using zebrafish as subjects found that when exposed to small amounts of ketamine (2 mg/L), zebrafish displayed more aggressive behavior. However, when the zebrafish were exposed to higher doses of ketamine (20 mg/L & 40 mg/L), their aggressive behavior subsided. Moreover, the highest dose of ketamine increased locomotion and circling behavior. In another study testing the behavioral effects of LSD on zebrafish found that zebrafish that were exposed to the substance demonstrated increased inter-fish distance when shoaling, and had increased cortisol levels. These could show possible side effects of LSD if used as a therapeutic drug.

== Invertebrates ==
=== Fruit flies ===
Ethanol serves as an energy source for the common fruit fly.

A study on fruit flies (Drosophila melanogaster) found that male flies become more aggressive when exposed to ethanol-containing food sources. This increased aggression is linked to the odor of ethanol, which enhances sensory neuron activity related to aggression-promoting pheromones and boosts attraction to citrus scents. These findings provide insights into how fruit flies interact with their environment.

In a study using D. melanogaster, researchers found that mating increases neuropeptide F (NPF) levels in male flies, while sexual deprivation decreases them. Manipulating the NPF system affects ethanol preference: activation reduces preference, and inhibition enhances it. Notably, artificially activating NPF neurons is rewarding on its own and diminishes the reward effect of ethanol. These findings suggest that the NPF-NPF receptor axis reflects the state of the fly's reward system and influences behavior.

=== Hornets (Vespa orientalis) ===
Ethanol is nutritious but highly intoxicating for most animals, which typically tolerate only up to 4% in their diet. However, a 2024 study found that oriental hornets fed sugary solutions containing 1% to 80% ethanol for a week showed no adverse effects on behavior or lifespan.

=== Molluscs ===
In experiments on slugs and snails cabbage leaves were sprayed with caffeine solutions and fed to Veronicella cubensis slugs and Zonitoides arboreus snails. Cabbage consumption reduced over time, followed by the death of the molluscs. Inhibition of feeding by caffeine was also observed for caterpillars.

=== Spiders ===
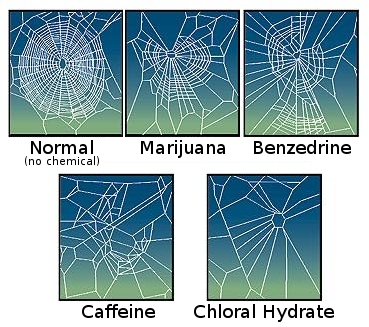
Drugs administered to a spider affect its ability to build a web.

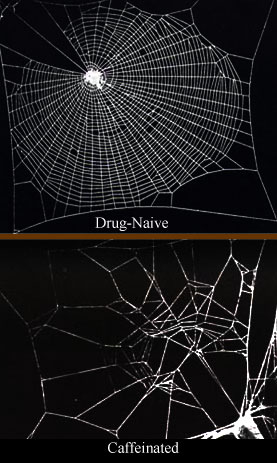
Caffeine has a significant effect on spiders, which is reflected in the construction of their webs.

In 1948, Swiss pharmacologist Peter N. Witt started his research on the effect of drugs on spiders. The initial motivation for the study was a request from his colleague, zoologist H. M. Peters, to shift the time when garden spiders build their webs from between 2:00 a.m. and 5:00 a.m., which was decidedly inconvenient for Peters, to earlier hours. Witt tested spiders with a range of psychoactive drugs, including amphetamine, mescaline, strychnine, LSD, and caffeine, and found that the drugs affect the size and shape of the web rather than the time when it is built. At small doses of caffeine (10 μg/spider), the webs were smaller; the radii were uneven, but the regularity of the circles was unaffected. At higher doses (100 μg/spider), the shape changed more, and the web design became irregular. All the drugs tested reduced web regularity except for small doses (0.1–0.3 μg) of LSD, which increased web regularity.

Webs produced under the influence of small doses of LSD show increased regularity.

The drugs were administered by dissolving them in sugar water, and a drop of solution was touched to the spider's mouth. In some later studies, spiders were fed with drugged flies. For qualitative studies, a well-defined volume of solution was administered through a fine syringe. The webs were photographed for the same spider before and after drugging.

Witt's research was discontinued, but it became reinvigorated in 1984 after a paper by J.A. Nathanson in the journal Science, which is discussed below. In 1995, a NASA research group repeated Witt's experiments on the effect of caffeine, benzedrine, marijuana and chloral hydrate on European garden spiders. NASA's results were qualitatively similar to those of Witt, but the novelty was that the pattern of the spider web was quantitatively analyzed with modern statistical tools, and proposed as a sensitive method of drug detection.

==== Other arthropods ====
In 1984, Nathanson reported an effect of methylxanthines on larvae of the tobacco hornworm. He administered solutions of finely powdered tea leaves or coffee beans to the larvae and observed, at concentrations between 0.3 and 10% for coffee and 0.1 to 3% for tea, inhibition of feeding, associated with hyperactivity and tremor. At higher concentrations, larvae were killed within 24 hours. He repeated the experiments with purified caffeine and concluded that the drug was responsible for the effect, and the concentration differences between coffee beans and tea leaves originated from 2–3 times higher caffeine content in the latter. Similar action was observed for IBMX on mosquito larvae, mealworm larvae, butterfly larvae and milkweed bug nymphs, that is, inhibition of feeding and death at higher doses. Flour beetles were unaffected by IBMX up to 3% concentrations, but long-term experiments revealed suppression of reproductive activity.

Further, Nathanson fed tobacco hornworm larvae with leaves sprayed with such psychoactive drugs as caffeine, formamidine pesticide didemethylchlordimeform (DDCDM), IBMX or theophylline. He observed a similar effect, namely inhibition of feeding followed by death. Nathanson concluded that caffeine and related methylxanthines could be natural pesticides developed by plants as protection against worms: Caffeine is found in many plant species, with high levels in seedlings that are still developing foliage, but are lacking mechanical protection; caffeine paralyzes and kills certain insects feeding upon the plant. High caffeine levels have also been found in the soil surrounding coffee bean seedlings. It is therefore understood that caffeine has a natural function, both as a Biopesticide and as an inhibitor of seed germination of other nearby coffee seedlings, thus giving it a better chance of survival.

Coffee berry borers seem to be unaffected by caffeine, in that their feeding rate did not change when they were given leaves sprayed with caffeine solution. It was concluded that those beetles have adapted to caffeine. This study was further developed by changing the solvent for caffeine. Although aqueous caffeine solutions had indeed no effect on the beetles, oleate emulsions of caffeine did inhibit their feeding, suggesting that even if certain insects have adjusted to some caffeine forms, they can be tricked by changing minor details, such as the drug solvent.

== Mammals ==
=== Dogs ===
Pavlov 1910 administered apomorphine plus a tone, when later, only the tone, was associated with restlessness or drooling.

=== Dolphins ===
Bottlenose dolphins were administered LSD in the 1960s as part of NASA-funded experiments by John C. Lilly to study human–animal communication. The drug caused the animals to become more vocal, but did not enable meaningful communication.

=== Elephants ===
"Tusko" was the name of a male Indian elephant at the Oklahoma City Zoo. On August 3, 1962, researchers from the University of Oklahoma injected (human use involves oral ingestion) 297 mg of LSD to him, which is nearly three thousand times the human recreational dose (for an animal weighing roughly one hundred times as much as a human). (Note: Tusko's realistic, unexaggerated weight was probably around 14,000 lb (6,350 kg), whereas the world average for an adult human's weight (in early 2019) was 136.7 lb (62.0 kg).) Within five minutes he collapsed to the ground and one hour and forty minutes later he died. It is believed that the LSD was the cause of his death, although some speculate that the drugs the researchers used in an attempt to revive him may have contributed to his death. In 1984, psychologist Ronald K. Siegel repeated the experiment with two elephants, using LSD only. Both survived.

=== Macaque monkeys ===
Macaque monkeys administered with the antipsychotics haloperidol and olanzapine over a 17–27 month period showed reduced brain volume. These results have not been observed in humans who also take the drug, due to the lack of available data.

=== Squirrel monkeys ===
In a scientific study, researchers looked at how different drugs are self-administered by squirrel monkeys. The drugs they studied included cocaine and a few others that have some similarities to cocaine in how they affect the brain.

They trained the monkeys to give themselves these drugs through injections and observed their behavior. They wanted to see if the drugs had similar effects on the monkeys.

The results showed that cocaine and some of the other drugs had similar effects in maintaining the monkeys' self-administration behavior. However, one of the drugs, mazindol, did not have the same effect on all the monkeys.

This suggests that the drugs that had similar effects may work in similar ways in the brain, affecting the monkeys' behavior in a comparable manner. The study also indicated that the reinforcing (addictive) and stimulating effects of these drugs might be related to how they interact with specific areas in the brain.

Overall, the research provides insights into how these drugs affect behavior and their potential for addiction.

The researchers used a resident-intruder model to simulate social stress, with a focus on how social rank influenced the effects. The results showed that the confrontation influenced the monkeys' response to cocaine. When subordinate monkeys acted as intruders, their self-administration of low-dose cocaine increased, and their dose-response curve shifted to the left. In contrast, dominant monkeys experienced a decrease in cocaine self-administration and a rightward shift in the dose-response curve.

Brain glucose metabolism measurements revealed differences between dominant and subordinate monkeys, shedding light on the underlying mechanisms of these opposing behavioral effects. Dominant monkeys showed higher activity in brain regions related to visual processing, attention, and vigilance, while subordinate monkeys exhibited higher activity in areas linked to emotional processing and anxiety.

Both groups showed increased brain activity in regions associated with the reward system and stress response. Dominant monkeys also displayed higher aggression during the confrontations, suggesting that the opportunity to aggress might serve as a reinforcer.

The study indicated that the social context strongly influences behavior and drug effects, offering insights into individual differences in drug self-administration. It emphasized the need to consider the influence of social factors when developing treatments for cocaine use disorders, tailoring interventions to individuals based on their responses to social and environmental stressors. Understanding the neural and behavioral mechanisms at play in these scenarios can lead to more effective, personalized treatments for individuals with cocaine use disorders.

== See also ==
- Rat park
- Venom resistant animals
