= Environmental enrichment =

Brain stimulation through physical and social surroundings

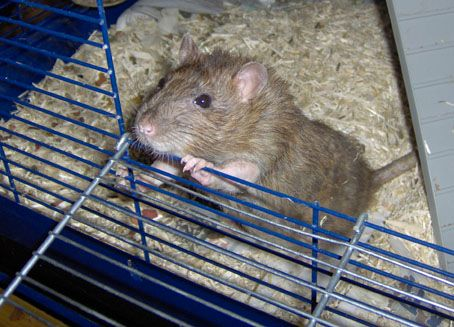
A rodent is not stimulated by the environment in a wire cage, and this affects its brain negatively, particularly the complexity of its synaptic connections

Environmental enrichment is the stimulation of the brain by its physical and social surroundings. Brains in richer, more stimulating environments have higher rates of synaptogenesis and more complex dendrite arbors, leading to increased brain activity. This effect takes place primarily during neurodevelopment, but also during adulthood to a lesser degree. With extra synapses there is also increased synapse activity, leading to an increased size and number of glial energy-support cells. Environmental enrichment also enhances capillary vasculation, providing the neurons and glial cells with extra energy. The neuropil (neurons, glial cells, capillaries, combined) expands, thickening the cortex. Research on rodent brains suggests that environmental enrichment may also lead to an increased rate of neurogenesis.

Research on animals finds that environmental enrichment could aid the treatment and recovery of numerous brain-related dysfunctions, including Alzheimer's disease and those connected to aging, whereas a lack of stimulation might impair cognitive development. Moreover, this research also suggests that environmental enrichment leads to a greater level of cognitive reserve, the brain's resilience to the effects of conditions such as aging and dementia.

Research on humans suggests that lack of stimulation delays and impairs cognitive development. Research also finds that attaining and engaging in higher levels of education, environments in which people participate in more challenging cognitively stimulating activities, results in greater cognitive reserve.

== Early research ==
Donald O. Hebb in 1947 found that rats raised as pets performed better on problem solving tests than rats raised in cages. His research, however, did not investigate the brain nor use standardized impoverished and enriched environments. Research doing this first was started in 1960 at the University of California, Berkeley by Mark Rosenzweig, who compared single rats in normal cages, and those placed in ones with toys, ladders, tunnels, running wheels in groups. This found that growing up in enriched environments affected enzyme cholinesterase activity. This work led in 1962 to the discovery that environmental enrichment increased cerebral cortex volume. In 1964, it was found that this was due to increased cerebral cortex thickness and greater synapse and glial numbers.

Also starting around 1960, Harry Harlow studied the effects of maternal and social deprivation on rhesus monkey infants (a form of environmental stimulus deprivation). This established the importance of social stimulation for normal cognitive and emotional development.

== Synapses ==
=== Synaptogenesis ===
Rats raised with environmental enrichment have thicker cerebral cortices (3.3–7%) that contain 25% more synapses. This effect of environmental richness upon the brain occurs whether it is experienced immediately following birth, after weaning, or during maturity. When synapse numbers increase in adults, they can remain high in number even when the adults are returned to impoverished environment for 30 days suggesting that such increases in synapse numbers are not necessarily temporary. However, the increase in synapse numbers has been observed generally to reduce with maturation. Stimulation affects not only synapses upon pyramidal neurons (the main projecting neurons in the cerebral cortex) but also stellate ones (that are usually interneurons). It can also affect neurons outside the brain, such as those in the retina.

=== Dendrite complexity ===
Environmental enrichment affects the complexity and length of the dendrite arbors (upon which synapses form). Higher-order dendrite branch complexity is increased in enriched environments, as can the length, in young animals, of distal branches. Environmental enrichment rescues harmful effects of stress on dendritic complexity.

=== Activity and energy consumption ===
Animals in enriched environments show evidence of increased synapse activation. Synapses tend to also be much larger. Gamma oscillations become larger in amplitude in the hippocampus. This increased energy consumption is reflected in glial and local capillary vasculation that provides synapses with extra energy.

- Glial cell numbers per neuron increase 12–14%
- The direct apposition area of glial cells with synapses expands by 19%
- The volume of glial cell nuclei for each synapse is higher by 37.5%
- The mean volume of mitochondria per neuron is 20% greater
- The volume of glial cell nuclei for each neuron is 63% higher
- Capillary density is increased.
- Capillaries are wider (4.35 μm compared to 4.15 μm in controls)
- Shorter distance exist between any part of the neuropil and a capillary (27.6 μm compared to 34.6 μm)

These energy related changes to the neuropil are responsible for increasing the volume of the cerebral cortex (the increase in synapse numbers contributes in itself hardly any extra volume).

=== Motor learning stimulation ===
Part of the effect of environmental enrichment is providing opportunities to acquire motor skills. Research on rats learning an "acrobatic" skill shows that such learning activity leads to increased synapse count.

=== Maternal transmission ===
Environmental enrichment during pregnancy has effects upon the fetus, such as accelerating his or her retinal development.

== Neurogenesis ==
Environmental enrichment can also lead to the formation of neurons (at least in rats) and reverse both the loss of neurons in the hippocampus and memory impairment from chronic stress. However, its relevance has been questioned for the behavioral effects of enriched environments.

== Mechanisms ==
Enriched environments affect the expression of genes that determine neuronal structure in the cerebral cortex and hippocampus. At the molecular level, this occurs through increased concentrations of the neurotrophins NGF, NT-3, and changes in BDNF. This alters the activation of cholinergic neurons, 5-HT, and beta-adrenolin. Another effect is to increase proteins such as synaptophysin and PSD-95 in synapses. Changes in Wnt signaling have also been found to mimic in adult mice the effects of environmental enrichment upon synapses in the hippocampus. Increase in neurons numbers could be linked to changes in VEGF.

== Rehabilitation and resilience ==
Research in animals suggests that environmental enrichment aids recovery from certain neurological disorders and cognitive impairments. There are two mains areas of focus: neurological rehabilitation and cognitive reserve, the brain's resistance to the effects of exposure to physical, natural, and social threats. Although most of these experiments used animal subjects, mainly rodents, researchers have pointed to the affected areas of animal brains to which human brains are most similar and used their findings as evidence to show that humans would have comparable reactions to enriched environments. The tests done on animals are thus meant to represent human simulations for the following list of conditions.

=== Neurological rehabilitation ===
==== Autism ====
A study conducted in 2011 led to the conclusion that environmental enrichment vastly improves the cognitive ability of children with autism. The study found that autistic children who receive olfactory and tactile stimulation along with exercises that stimulated other paired sensory modalities clinically improved by 42 percent while autistic children not receiving this treatment clinically improved by just 7 percent. The same study also showed that there was significant clinical improvement in autistic children exposed to enriched sensorimotor environments, and a vast majority of parents reported that their child's quality of life was much better with the treatment. A second study confirmed its effectiveness. The second study also found after 6 months of sensory enrichment therapy, 21% of the children who initially had been given an autism classification, using the Autism Diagnostic Observation Schedule, improved to the point that, although they remained on the autism spectrum, they no longer met the criteria for classic autism. None of the standard care controls reached an equivalent level of improvement. The therapy using the methodologies is titled Sensory Enrichment Therapy.

==== Alzheimer's disease ====
Through environmental enrichment, researchers were able to enhance and partially repair memory deficits in mice between ages of 2 to 7 months with characteristics of Alzheimer's disease. Mice in enriched environments performed significantly better on object recognition tests and the Morris Water Maze than they had when they were in standard environments. It was thus concluded that environmental enrichment enhances visual and learning memory for those with Alzheimer's. Furthermore, it has been found that mouse models of Alzheimer's disease that were exposed to enriched environment before amyloid onset (at 3 months of age) and then returned to their home cage for over 7 months, showed preserved spatial memory and reduced amyloid deposition at 13 months old, when they are supposed to show dramatic memory deficits and amyloid plaque load. These findings reveal the preventive, and long-lasting effects of early life stimulating experience on Alzheimer-like pathology in mice and likely reflect the capacity of enriched environment to efficiently stimulate the cognitive reserve. A human study suggests that enriched gardens contribute to better cognitive function and independence in activities of daily living, compared to conventional sensory gardens.

==== Huntington's disease ====
Research has indicated that environmental enrichment can help relieve motor and psychiatric deficits caused by Huntington's disease. It also improves lost protein levels for those with the disease, and prevents striatal and hippocampal deficits in the BDNF, located in the hippocampus. These findings have led researchers to suggest that environmental enrichment has a potential to be a possible form of therapy for those with Huntington's.

==== Parkinson's disease ====
Multiple studies have reported that environmental enrichment for adult mice helps relieve neuronal death, which is particularly beneficial to those with Parkinson's disease. A more recent study shows that environmental enrichment particularly affects the nigrostriatal pathway, which is important for managing dopamine and acetylcholine levels, critical for motor deficits. Moreover, it was found that environmental enrichment has beneficial effects for the social implications of Parkinson's disease.

==== Stroke ====
Research done in animals has shown that subjects recovering in an enriched environment 15 days after having a stroke had significantly improved neurobehavioral function. In addition these same subjects showed greater capability of learning and larger infarct post-intervention than those who were not in an enriched environment. It was thus concluded that environmental enrichment had a considerable beneficial effect on the learning and sensorimotor functions on animals post-stroke. A 2013 study also found that environmental enrichment socially benefits patients recovering from stroke. Researchers in that study concluded that stroke patients in enriched environments in assisted-care facilities are much more likely to be engaging with other patients during normal social hours instead of being alone or sleeping.

==== Rett syndrome ====
A 2008 study found that environmental enrichment was significant in aiding recovery of motor coordination and some recovery of BDNF levels in female mice with conditions similar to those of Rett syndrome. Over the course of 30 weeks female mice in enriched environments showed superior ability in motor coordination to those in standard conditions. Although they were unable to have full motor capability, they were able to prevent a more severe motor deficit by living in an enriched environment. These results combined with increased levels of BDNF in the cerebellum led researchers to conclude that an enriched environment that stimulates areas of the motor cortex and areas of the cerebellum having to do with motor learning is beneficial in aiding mice with Rett syndrome.

==== Amblyopia ====
A recent study found that adult rats with amblyopia improved visual acuity two weeks after being placed into an enriched environment. The same study showed that another two weeks after ending environmental enrichment, the rats retained their visual acuity improvement. Conversely, rats in a standard environment showed no improvement in visual acuity. It was thus concluded that environmental enrichment reduces GABA inhibition and increases BDNF expression in the visual cortex. As a result, the growth and development of neurons and synapses in the visual cortex were much improved due to the enriched environment.

==== Sensory deprivation ====
Studies have shown that with the help of environmental enrichment the effects of sensory deprivation can be corrected. For example, a visual impairment known as "dark-rearing" in the visual cortex can be prevented and rehabilitated. In general, an enriched environment will improve, if not repair, the sensory systems animals possess.

==== Lead poisoning ====
During development, gestation is one of the most critical periods for exposure to any lead. Exposure to high levels of lead at this time can lead to inferior spatial learning performance. Studies have shown that environmental enrichment can overturn damage to the hippocampus induced by lead exposure. Learning and spatial memory that are dependent on the long-term potentiation of the hippocampus are vastly improve as subjects in an enriched environments had lower levels of lead concentration in their hippocampi. The findings also showed that enriched environments result in some natural protection of lead-induced brain deficits.

==== Chronic spinal cord injuries ====
Research has indicated that animals suffering from spinal cord injuries showed significant improvement in motor capabilities even with a long delay in treatment after the injury when exposed to environmental enrichment. Social interactions, exercise, and novelty all play major roles in aiding the recovery of an injured subject. This has led to some suggestions that the spinal cord has a continued plasticity and all efforts must be made for enriched environments to stimulate this plasticity in order to aid recovery.

==== Maternal deprivation stress ====
Maternal deprivation can be caused by the abandonment by a nurturing parent at a young age. In rodents or nonhuman primates, this leads to a higher vulnerability for stress-related illness. Research suggests that environmental enrichment can reverse the effects of maternal separation on stress reactivity, possibly by affecting the hippocampus, the amygdala and the prefrontal cortex.

==== Child neglect ====
In all children, maternal care is one of the significant influences for hippocampal development, providing the foundation for stable and individualized learning and memory. However, this is not the case for those who have experienced child neglect. Researchers determined that through environmental enrichment, a neglected child can partially receive the same hippocampal development and stability, albeit not at the same level as that of the presence of a parent or guardian. The results were comparable to those of child intervention programs, rendering environmental enrichment a useful method for dealing with child neglect.

=== Cognitive reserve ===
==== Aging ====
Decreased hippocampal neurogenesis is a characteristic of aging. Environmental enrichment increases neurogenesis in aged rodents by potentiating neuronal differentiation and new cell survival. As a result, subjects exposed to environmental enrichment aged better due to superior ability in retaining their levels of spatial and learning memory.

==== Prenatal and perinatal cocaine exposure ====
Research has shown that mice exposed to environmental enrichment are less affected by the consequences of cocaine exposure in comparison with those in standard environments. Although the levels of dopamine in the brains of both sets of mice were relatively similar, when both subjects were exposed to the cocaine injection, mice in enriched environment were significantly less responsive than those in standard environments. It was thus concluded that both the activating and rewarding effects are suppressed by environmental enrichment and early exposure to environmental enrichment can help prevent drug addiction.

== Humans ==
Though environmental enrichment research has been mostly done upon rodents, similar effects occur in primates, and are likely to affect the human brain. However, direct research upon human synapses and their numbers is limited since this requires histological study of the brain. A link, however, has been found between educational level and greater dendritic branch complexity following autopsy removal of the brain.

=== Localized cerebral cortex changes ===
MRI detects localized cerebral cortex expansion after people learn complex tasks such as mirror reading (in this case in the right occipital cortex), three-ball juggling (bilateral mid-temporal area and left posterior intraparietal sulcus), and when medical students intensively revise for exams (bilaterally in the posterior and lateral parietal cortex). Such changes in gray matter volume can be expected to link to changes in synapse numbers due to the increased numbers of glial cells and the expanded capillary vascularization needed to support their increased energy consumption.

=== Institutional deprivation ===
Children that receive impoverished stimulation due to being confined to cots without social interaction or reliable caretakers in low quality orphanages show severe delays in cognitive and social development. 12% of them if adopted after 6 months of age show autistic or mildly autistic traits later at four years of age. Some children in such impoverished orphanages at two and half years of age still fail to produce intelligible words, though a year of foster care enabled such children to catch up in their language in most respects. Catch-up in other cognitive functioning also occurs after adoption, though problems continue in many children if this happens after the age of 6 months.

Such children show marked differences in their brains, consistent with research upon experiment animals, compared to children from normally stimulating environments. They have reduced brain activity in the orbital prefrontal cortex, amygdala, hippocampus, temporal cortex, and brain stem. They also showed less developed white matter connections between different areas in their cerebral cortices, particularly the uncinate fasciculus.

Conversely, enriching the experience of preterm infants with massage quickens the maturation of their electroencephalographic activity and their visual acuity. Moreover, as with enrichment in experimental animals, this associates with an increase in IGF-1.

=== Cognitive reserve and resilience ===
Another source of evidence for the effect of environment stimulation upon the human brain is cognitive reserve (a measure of the brain's resilience to cognitive impairment) and the level of a person's education. Not only is higher education linked to a more cognitively demanding educational experience, but it also correlates with a person's general engagement in cognitively demanding activities. The more education a person has received, the less the effects of aging, dementia, white matter hyperintensities, MRI-defined brain infarcts, Alzheimer's disease, and traumatic brain injury. Also, aging and dementia are less in those that engage in complex cognitive tasks. The cognitive decline of those with epilepsy could also be affected by the level of a person's education.

== See also ==
- Behavioral enrichment
- Neural development
- Neuroplasticity
- Perceptual learning
- Phenotypic plasticity
- Rat Park
- Stimulation
- Synaptogenesis

== Bibliography ==
- Diamond, Marian Cleeves (1988). Enriching Heredity: The Impact of the Environment on the Anatomy of the Brain. New York: Free Press. ISBN 978-0-02-907431-2.
- Jensen, Eric (2006). Enriching the Brain: How to maximize every learner's potential. San Francisco: Jossey-Bass, A John Wiley & Sons Imprint. ISBN 978-0-7879-7547-0.
- Renner MJ, Rosenzweig MR (1987). Enriched and Impoverished Environments: Effects on Brain and Behavior. New York: Springer-Verlag. ISBN 978-3-540-96523-7.
