= Rosenhan experiment =

Experiment to determine the validity of psychiatric diagnosis

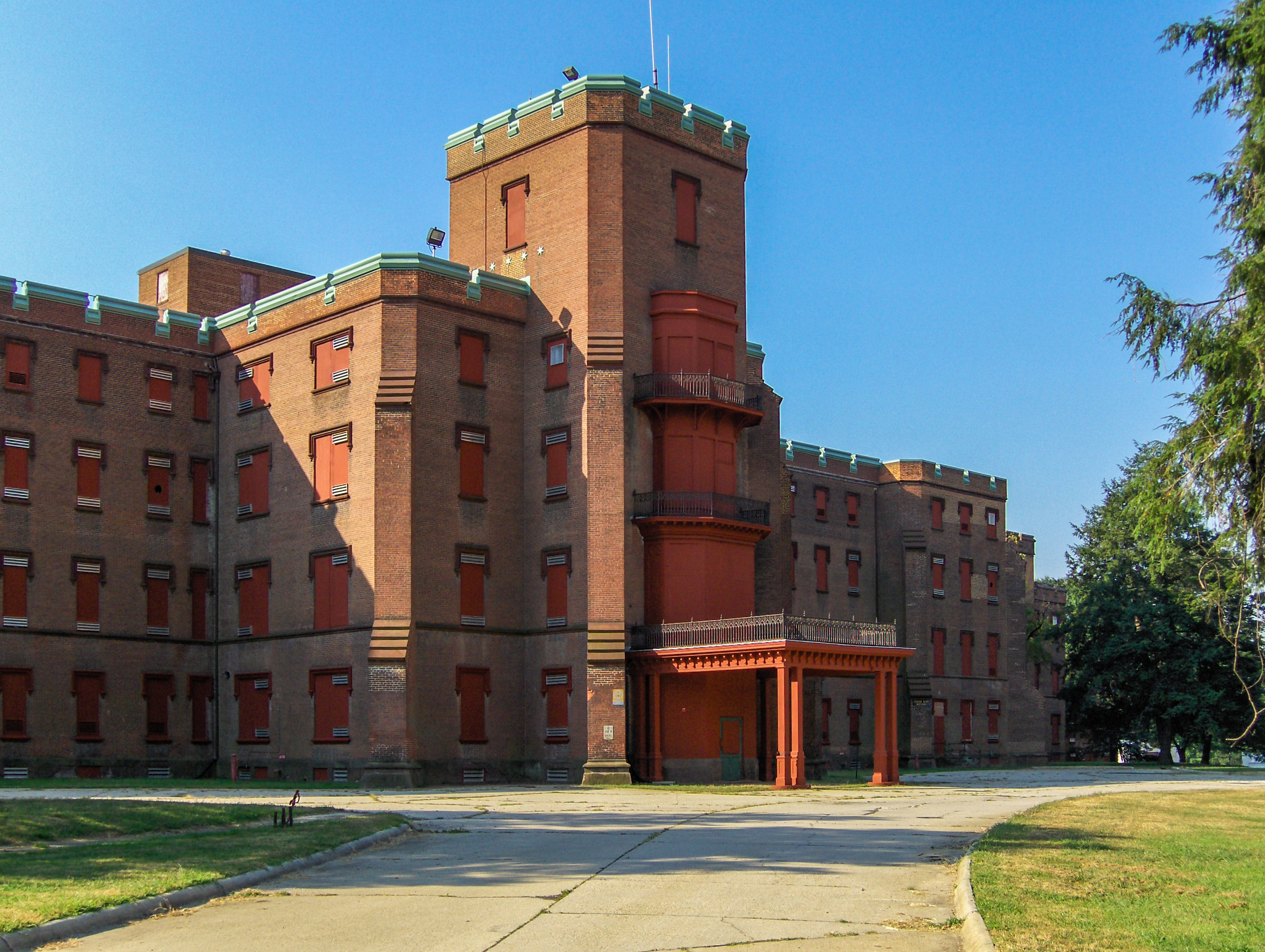
The main building of St. Elizabeths Hospital (1996), located in Washington, D.C., now part of the headquarters of the U.S. Department of Homeland Security, was one of the sites of the Rosenhan experiment

The Rosenhan experiment or Thud experiment was a study regarding the validity of psychiatric diagnosis. For the experiment, participants submitted themselves for evaluation at various psychiatric institutions and feigned hallucinations in order to be accepted, but acted normally from then onward. Each was diagnosed with a psychiatric disorder and given antipsychotic medication. The study was arranged by psychologist David Rosenhan, a Stanford University professor, and published by the journal Science in 1973 with the title On Being Sane In Insane Places.

As a critique of psychiatric diagnosis, it broached the topic of wrongful involuntary commitment. The experiment is said to have "accelerated the movement to reform mental institutions and to deinstitutionalize as many mental patients as possible". Rosenhan claimed that he, along with eight other people (five men and three women), entered 12 hospitals in five states on both coasts of the US. Three of the participants were admitted for only a brief period of time, and in order to obtain sufficient documented experiences, they re-applied to additional institutions.

Respondents defended psychiatry against the experiment's conclusions, saying that as psychiatric diagnosis relies largely on the patient's report of their experiences, faking their presence no more demonstrates problems with psychiatric diagnosis than lying about other medical symptoms.

It has been alleged that at least part of the published results were distorted or falsified.

== Pseudopatient experiment ==
While listening to a lecture by Ronald D. Laing, a psychiatrist, Rosenhan conceived of the experiment as a way to test the reliability of psychiatric diagnoses. The study concluded "it is clear that we cannot distinguish the sane from the insane in psychiatric hospitals" and also illustrated the dangers of dehumanization and suggestion in psychiatric institutions. It suggested that the use of community mental health facilities which concentrated on specific problems and behaviors rather than psychiatric terminology might be a solution, and recommended education to make psychiatric workers more aware of the social psychology of their facilities.

Rosenhan himself and seven mentally healthy associates, termed "pseudopatients", attempted to gain admission to psychiatric hospitals by telephoning for an appointment and feigning auditory hallucinations. The hospital staff were not informed of the experiment. The pseudopatients included a psychology graduate student aged in his twenties, three psychologists, a pediatrician, a psychiatrist, a painter, and a housewife. None had a history of mental illness. Pseudopatients used pseudonyms, and those who were mental health professionals were given false jobs in a different sector to avoid invoking any special treatment or scrutiny. Apart from giving false names and employment details, further biographical details were reported truthfully.

During their initial psychiatric assessment, the pseudopatients claimed to be hearing voices of the same sex as the patient which were often unclear, but which seemed to pronounce the words "empty", "hollow", or "thud", and nothing else. These words were chosen as they vaguely suggest some sort of existential crisis and for the lack of any published literature referencing them as psychotic symptoms. No other psychiatric symptoms were claimed according to Rosenhan's publication, but medical records have indicated that, at least in the case of one pseudopatient, more were shared to the hospital such as not being able to sleep, feeling cold all over, being unable to work for six months, being sensitive to radio signals, having suicidal thoughts, etc. Grimacing and twitching were also observed by the doctor who examined one of the pseudopatients. If admitted, the pseudopatients were instructed to "act normally", reporting that they felt fine and no longer heard voices. Hospital records obtained after the experiment indicate that all pseudopatients were characterized as friendly and cooperative by staff.

All were admitted, to 12 psychiatric hospitals across the United States, including underfunded public hospitals in rural areas, urban university-run hospitals with excellent reputations, and one expensive private hospital. Though presented with identical symptoms, seven were diagnosed with schizophrenia at public hospitals, and one with manic-depressive psychosis, a more optimistic diagnosis with better clinical outcomes, at the private hospital. Their stays ranged from 7 to 52 days, and the average was 19 days. All but one were discharged with a diagnosis of schizophrenia "in remission", which Rosenhan considered as evidence that mental illness is perceived as an irreversible condition creating a lifelong stigma rather than a curable illness.

Despite openly and frequently taking extensive notes on the behavior of the staff and other patients, none of the pseudopatients were identified as impostors by the hospital staff, although many of the other psychiatric patients seemed to be able to correctly identify them as impostors. In the first three hospitalizations, 35 of the total of 118 patients expressed a suspicion that the pseudopatients were sane, with some suggesting that the patients were researchers or journalists investigating the hospital. Hospital notes indicated that staff interpreted much of the pseudopatients' behavior in terms of mental illness. For example, one nurse labeled the note-taking of one pseudopatient as "writing behavior" and considered it pathological. The patients' normal biographies were described in hospital records consistent with what was expected of schizophrenics by the then-dominant theories of its cause.

The experiment required the pseudopatients to get out of the hospital on their own by getting the hospital to release them, though a lawyer was retained to be on call for emergencies when it became clear that the pseudopatients would not ever be voluntarily released on short notice. Once admitted and diagnosed, the pseudopatients were not able to obtain their release until they agreed with the psychiatrists that they were mentally ill and began taking antipsychotic medications, which they flushed down a toilet. No staff member reported that the pseudopatients were not taking their medication.

Rosenhan and the other pseudopatients reported an overwhelming sense of dehumanization, severe invasion of privacy, and boredom while hospitalized. Their possessions were searched randomly, and they were sometimes observed while using the toilet. They reported that though the staff seemed to be well-meaning, they generally objectified and dehumanized the patients, often discussing patients at length in their presence as though they were not there, and avoiding direct interaction with patients except as strictly necessary to perform official duties. Some attendants were prone to verbal and physical abuse of patients when other staff were not present. A group of patients waiting outside the cafeteria half an hour before lunchtime were said by a doctor to his students to be experiencing "oral-acquisitive" psychiatric symptoms. Contact with doctors averaged 6.8 minutes per day.

== Non-existent impostor experiment ==
For this experiment, Rosenhan used a well-known research and teaching hospital, the staff of which had learned of the results of the initial study but claimed that similar errors could not be made at their institution. Rosenhan arranged with them that during a three-month period, one or more pseudopatients would attempt to gain admission and the staff would rate every incoming patient as to the likelihood they were an impostor. Of 193 patients, 41 were considered to be impostors and a further 42 were considered suspect. In reality, Rosenhan had sent no pseudopatients; all patients suspected as impostors by the hospital staff were ordinary patients. This resulted in a conclusion that "any diagnostic process that lends itself too readily to massive errors of this sort cannot be a very reliable one".

== Impact ==
Rosenhan published his findings in Science, in which he criticized the reliability of psychiatric diagnosis and the disempowering and demeaning nature of patient care experienced by the associates during the study. Additionally, he described his work in a variety of news appearances, including to the BBC:

I told friends, I told my family: "I can get out when I can get out. That's all. I'll be there for a couple of days and I'll get out." Nobody knew I'd be there for two months ... The only way out was to point out that they're [the psychiatrists are] correct. They had said I was insane, "I am insane; but I am getting better." That was an affirmation of their view of me.

The experiment is said to have "accelerated the movement to reform mental institutions and to deinstitutionalize as many mental patients as possible".

=== Criticisms ===
Many respondents to the publication defended psychiatry, saying that as psychiatric diagnosis relies largely on the patient's report of their experiences, faking their presence no more demonstrates problems with psychiatric diagnosis than lying about other medical symptoms. In this vein, psychiatrist Robert Spitzer quoted Seymour S. Kety in a 1975 criticism of Rosenhan's study:

If I were to drink a quart of blood and, concealing what I had done, come to the emergency room of any hospital vomiting blood, the behavior of the staff would be quite predictable. If they labeled and treated me as having a bleeding peptic ulcer, I doubt that I could argue convincingly that medical science does not know how to diagnose that condition.

Kety also said that psychiatrists should not necessarily be expected to assume that a patient is pretending to have mental illness, thus the study lacked realism. Instead of considering realistic problems in diagnosis, such as comorbidity or differential diagnosis between disorders with similar symptoms, Rosenhan dismissed the criticism as further examples of the "experimenter effect" or "expectation bias," and evidence for his interpretation that he had discovered genuine problems of diagnosis rather than being fooled by his method.

=== Accusation of fraud ===
In The Great Pretender, a 2019 book on Rosenhan, author Susannah Cahalan questions the veracity and validity of the Rosenhan experiment. Examining documents left by Rosenhan after his death, Cahalan finds apparent distortion in the Science article: inconsistent data, misleading descriptions, and inaccurate or fabricated quotations from psychiatric records. Moreover, despite an extensive search, she is only able to identify two of the eight pseudopatients: Rosenhan himself, and a graduate student whose testimony is allegedly inconsistent with Rosenhan's description in the article. Due to Rosenhan's seeming willingness to alter the truth in other ways regarding the experiment, Cahalan questions whether some or all of the six other pseudopatients might have been simply invented by Rosenhan.

In February 2023, Andrew Scull of the University of California at San Diego published an article in the peer-reviewed journal History of Psychiatry in support of Cahalan's allegations, labelling the experiment a "successful scientific fraud".

== Related experiments ==
In 1887, American investigative journalist Nellie Bly feigned symptoms of mental illness to gain admission to a lunatic asylum and report on the terrible conditions therein. The results were published as Ten Days in a Mad-House.

In 1968, Maurice K. Temerlin split 25 psychiatrists into two groups and had them listen to an actor portraying a character of normal mental health. One group was told that the actor "was a very interesting man because he looked neurotic, but actually was quite psychotic" while the other was told nothing. Sixty percent of the former group diagnosed psychoses, most often schizophrenia, while none of the control group did so.

In 1988, Loring and Powell gave 290 psychiatrists a transcript of a patient interview and told half of them that the patient was black and the other half white; they concluded of the results that "clinicians appear to ascribe violence, suspiciousness, and dangerousness to black clients even though the case studies are the same as the case studies for the white clients."

In 2004, psychologist Lauren Slater claimed to have performed an experiment very similar to Rosenhan's for her book Opening Skinner's Box. Slater wrote that she had presented herself at 9 psychiatric emergency rooms with auditory hallucinations, resulting in being diagnosed "almost every time" with psychotic depression. However, when challenged to provide evidence of actually performing her experiment, she could not. The serious methodological and other concerns regarding Slater's work appeared as a series of responses to a journal report, in the same journal.

In 2008, the BBC's science television series Horizon performed a similar experiment for two episodes entitled "How Mad Are You?" The experiment involved ten subjects, five with previously diagnosed mental health conditions, and five with no such diagnosis. They were observed by three experts in mental health diagnoses and their challenge was to identify the five with mental health problems solely from their behavior, without speaking to the subjects or learning anything of their histories. The experts correctly diagnosed two of the ten patients, misdiagnosed one patient, and incorrectly identified two healthy patients as having mental health problems. Unlike the other experiments listed here, however, the purpose of this journalistic exercise was not to criticize the diagnostic process, but to minimize the stigmatization of the mentally ill. It was intended to show that people with a previous diagnosis of a mental illness could live normal lives with their health problems not obvious to observers from their behavior.

One of the main claims of the Rosenhan experiment was that clinicians could be negatively biased in their first clinical impression, which would negatively affect further clinical decisions. Christoph Flückiger and colleagues conducted two experiments in 2024 (N = 56 and 64) in which psychotherapists were asked to give their first clinical impressions in two consecutive cases after a brief presentation of the case (case description and video excerpt) and a short recall task on the information provided. The attentional focus in the recall task served as an independent variable: therapists had to adopt either a symptom-focused or a strength-focused attentional focus to recall the cases, i.e. therapists rated their first case in either the symptom-focused or the strength-focused condition and the second case in the opposite condition. In both studies, the therapists in the symptom-focused conditions rated the patients as slightly more distressed, less resilient and less psychosocially integrated compared to the strength-focused conditions. However, these effects, although statistically significant, were rather small to clinically negligible. These preliminary results suggest that the first clinical impressions of contemporary psychotherapists in both experiments may be slightly, but not as dramatically, distorted as the Rosenhan experiment suggested at the time.

== See also ==
- Anti-psychiatry – Movement against psychiatric treatment
- Involuntary commitment – Compulsory hospitalization
- Labeling theory – Sociological theory
- Psychiatric hospital § Undercover journalism
- doi:10.1037/cou0000766
