= Stolen Focus =

2022 non-fiction book by Johann Hari

Stolen Focus: Why You Can't Pay Attention
- Author: Johann Hari
- Language: English
- Genre: Psychology, self-help
- Publisher: Bloomsbury Publishing
- Publication date: January 6, 2022
- Pages: 352
- ISBN: 9781526620224

Stolen Focus: Why You Can't Pay Attention (Note: Published as Stolen Focus: Why You Can't Pay Attention—and How to Think Deeply Again in the United States.) is 2022 non-fiction book written by Johann Hari and published by Bloomsbury Publishing. The book addresses the systemic causes of attention crisis in the information age, particularly addictions to social media and smartphones.

== Summary ==
In the book Hari examines the attention crisis in the information age and its potential causes. He identifies two causes: (1) personal failure, and (2) the actual causes--deeper powerful forces, including Big Tech. The main body of the book is divided into 12 chapters to address 12 deeper causes.

These deeper causes include physical and mental exhaustion and frequent distractions caused by smartphones. Hari argues that modern technology such as social media apps is deliberately made to capture and manipulate people's attention rather than serve humanity and that it only makes it harder for people to focus. He further notes that multitasking isn’t actually effective and that switching between tasks wears down the brain. Other elements discussed in the book include mind-wandering, which Hari finds is essential for human attention to properly function. Hari also discusses how tech companies impact the attention span. He uses Facebook and YouTube as examples of companies that purposefully try to maximize screen time so that they can collect extensive personal data that they can in turn use to fine-tune recommendations and ensure longer engagement.

During the course of the book Hari covers a digital detox that he undertook as an experiment. He purposefully switched to a non-internet capable flip phone and used a printed road map to navigate through Provincetown, Massachusetts, where he was staying in a beach house. He initially experienced agitation because he could not access the internet, but found that the longer he abstained the more he found himself able to easily clear his mind and focus on a single task. Hari also described that allowing his mind to wander brought him profound thoughts and innovative concepts.

Also in the book Hari discusses ways to fix the issues of attention. In one chapter he argues that simply trying harder or improving time-management isn’t enough, because our workplaces and technologies are built to demand constant availability. Being expected to reply instantly to emails, messages, and notifications creates stress and actually lowers productivity. Instead of blaming individuals, Hari suggests bigger, system-level changes, like regulating tech companies that profit from keeping people glued to their screens. He emphasizes that real solutions have to be collective, not just personal, and that protecting attention should be treated like a public health issue.

In the book's conclusion Hari describes the waning attention in the general population as a part of today's societal design as opposed to one's personal failing and suggests creating an "attention rebellion" to counteract the effects of our decreasing attention. Johann advocates for limiting access to the internet, reducing stress levels, shortening working hours, allowing children to play separately from screens, engaging in literature, and caring for one's physical health. He believes that a movement to regain the population's attention will bring truly important issues to the forefront of their minds, improving our future and paving the way for a more connected and protected society.

== Publication ==
Stolen Focus was first published in the United States in hardcover and e-book format on January 25, 2022, through Crown Publishing. An audiobook version narrated by Hari was published simultaneously through Random House Audio. The book has been translated into other languages such as Korean, Spanish, and Chinese.

== Reception ==
A review on San Francisco Chronicle notes that Stolen Focus examines the ecosystem, or the deeper causes, of the attention crisis, other than limiting on personal solution.

Kirkus Reviews gave Stolen Focus a positive review, praising its energy and style. Karlin Lillington, writing for The Irish Times, praised Stolen Focus for making academic research accessible, but added Hari sometimes goes too far in reducing complex topics to bullet points. A subsequent column in The Irish Times by Hugh Linehan cites criticism from psychologist Stuart J. Ritchie to note a lack of scientific evidence for the book's central thesis that people's ability to focus has changed over time. The Sydney Morning Herald recommended the book for people interested in the subject, but described Stolen Focus as mostly a retelling of research already covered in other publications.
