= Cognitive reserve =

Brain's and mind's resilience to brain damage

Cognitive reserve is a property of the brain that allows for cognitive performance that is better than expected given the degree of life-course–related brain changes and brain injury or disease. In this context, cognitive reserve can be understood as a key contributor to cognitive resilience, reflecting the brain's capacity to withstand or adapt to neuropathological burden. The conceptualization of cognitive reserve as a property of the brain encompasses multiple potential mechanisms operating at molecular, cellular, and network levels. The working hypothesis is that these mechanisms enable coping with or compensation for brain changes and the consequences of brain injury or disease.

== History and development ==
The concept of reserve against brain damage was introduced to account for the observed discrepancy between the degree of neuropathology and the expected clinical manifestations of disease. In a landmark postmortem study published in Annals of Neurology in 1988, Katzman and colleagues reported findings from postmortem examinations of approximately 137 elderly individuals and revealed a discrepancy between the degree of Alzheimer's disease neuropathology and the clinical manifestations of the disease. Within this cohort, a subgroup of 10 nursing home residents was identified who, despite showing AD pathology upon postmortem examination (e.g., neocortical plaques), had exhibited little to no cognitive impairment during life, with cognitive abilities that were on par with or superior to those of their healthy counterparts. Furthermore, these individuals were also found to have higher brain weights and a greater number of neurons compared with age-matched controls. The investigators speculated on two possible explanations for this phenomenon: that these individuals may have had incipient Alzheimer's disease but avoided substantial neuronal loss, or alternatively, that they began life with larger brains and a greater number of neurons, a quantitative advantage that may have functioned as a protective factor in preserving cognition. This study marked the first use of the term “reserve” in the literature to describe such protection against cognitive decline, with the authors asserting that this group of patients “started with more neurons and a larger brain and thus had greater reserve.”

Building on these early neuropathological observations, evidence from recovery following brain injury further supported the idea that individuals differ in their capacity to tolerate brain damage before clinical impairment becomes apparent. Observations that symptom onset and functional outcome following brain injury vary as a function of premorbid brain characteristics led to the hypothesis that some individuals possess a reserve that allows them to endure the effects of cognitive aging and neuropathology. Subsequent studies increasingly emphasized structural properties of brain morphology, such as greater brain volume and the corresponding higher number of neurons or synapses, as quantitative factors that could support preserved cognitive functioning in the presence of pathology. This emphasis on structural brain characteristics formed the basis of an early, quantitatively defined conception of reserve, later formalized as the brain reserve model.

=== Brain Reserve ===
Brain reserve refers to the capacity of the brain to tolerate increasing levels of pathology while maintaining adequate cognitive functioning and reflects the neurobiological status of the brain at a given point in time, including factors such as the number of neurons, synapses, and related structural characteristics. The central idea underlying brain reserve is that individuals with greater structural resources can sustain more neural depletion before clinical symptoms emerge. Early formulations conceptualized brain reserve as a passive, quantitative property, reflecting the amount of available neural substrate rather than adaptive changes in functional cognitive processing.

A central formulation of brain reserve was articulated by Satz (1993) in the brain reserve capacity threshold model, which proposes that clinical symptoms emerge only once accumulated brain damage exceeds a critical threshold. Within this framework, individuals with larger brain volume or greater numbers of neurons or synapses are hypothesized to tolerate greater neuropathology before exhibiting cognitive impairment, such that individuals with comparable levels of Alzheimer's disease pathology may show different clinical outcomes depending on the quantity of intact brain tissue available.

Empirical support for this model has come from studies examining structural proxies of brain reserve. A postmortem and neuroimaging study reported that Alzheimer's disease pathology in individuals with larger premorbid brain size did not necessarily result in clinical dementia, suggesting that greater neural resources may buffer against cognitive decline. Similarly, head circumference—often used as an indirect marker of maximal lifetime brain size—has been found to be independently associated with a reduced risk of clinically expressed Alzheimer's disease. However, findings across studies have been mixed, likely reflecting the indirect nature of head circumference and related measures as approximations of underlying neural resources. Additional evidence indicates that qualitative differences in neural substrate may influence vulnerability to clinical impairment. For example, synaptic loss has been reported to be greater in early-onset compared with late-onset Alzheimer's disease, potentially contributing to earlier clinical manifestation despite comparable levels of pathology. Structural contributors to brain reserve have also extended beyond the cerebral cortex, with the cerebellum also playing a notable role. The cerebellum contains a substantial proportion of the brain's neurons and participates in both cognitive and motor functions, and its extensive neuronal circuitry and capacity for plasticity have led to its consideration as a contributor to brain reserve.

Brain reserve is conceptually related to, but distinct from, brain maintenance, which refers to the relative absence of age-related changes in neural resources or neuropathological burden over time as a determinant of preserved cognition in older age. Whereas brain reserve relies primarily on cross-sectional differences in structural brain resources at a given point in time, brain maintenance emphasizes the longitudinal preservation of neurochemical, structural, and functional brain integrity across the lifespan, shaped by genetic and environmental influences.

Overall, brain reserve is considered a passive model of resilience, as it accounts for interindividual differences in the amount of damage the brain can sustain but assumes that reserve operates additively and confers a uniform protective benefit across individuals. Crucially, this framework is limited to structural capacity and does not account for active adaptations in cognitive processing, nor does it capture how differences in life experiences, functional brain organization, or neural efficiency influence cognitive outcomes in the presence of pathology.

=== Emergence of the cognitive reserve concept ===
The limitations of structurally-based accounts of reserve in explaining active, experience-dependent adaptations motivated the development of a complementary framework emphasizing functional mechanisms underlying resilience to brain pathology. Cognitive reserve (CR) emerged from the need to better explain the marked variability in cognitive outcomes observed among individuals with similar levels of brain pathology, beyond what could be accounted for by a simple quantification of structural brain resources alone. In contrast to brain reserve, cognitive reserve is considered an active model of reserve, as it describes the brain's ability to engage adaptive cognitive strategies or recruit alternative neural pathways to cope with existing pathology. As a result, two individuals with comparable levels of brain reserve may differ substantially in their tolerance to neuropathological burden, such that the threshold at which functional impairment becomes clinically manifest varies across individuals due to differences in processing efficiency, flexibility, or strategy use.

Early epidemiological and neuroimaging studies played a critical role in shaping this conceptual shift. Higher educational attainment was associated with a lower prevalence of Alzheimer's disease, as well as delayed clinical expression of dementia, suggesting that life experiences could modulate the relationship between neuropathology and clinical outcome. Similar associations were observed outside the context of dementia, with lower educational attainment linked to greater cognitive abnormalities in conditions such as HIV infection, supporting the generalizability of reserve mechanisms across disease processes.

Neuroimaging evidence also provided compelling support for the emerging concept of cognitive reserve. In a 1992 landmark study, Stern and colleagues matched patients with Alzheimer's disease for clinical severity and found that individuals with higher educational attainment exhibited significantly greater parietotemporal perfusion deficits, indicating more advanced neuropathology despite comparable cognitive performance. On this basis, the authors concluded that “education or its covariates or both may provide a reserve that compensates for the neuropathological changes of AD and delays the onset of its clinical manifestations.” In a subsequent work, they showed that higher educational and occupational attainment were associated with a reduced risk of incident Alzheimer's disease, leading the authors to speculate that “advanced educational and occupational attainment may also supply a reserve that allows an individual to cope longer before AD is clinically expressed.” The authors further noted that “the fact that our findings were seen most clearly when only the incidence of pure Alzheimer's disease was considered strengthens the concept of cognitive reserve.” Subsequent longitudinal studies suggested that individuals with greater reserve may experience more rapid cognitive decline once clinical impairment becomes apparent, consistent with the eventual exhaustion of compensatory mechanisms.

Together, these findings marked the first explicit articulation of the concept of cognitive reserve, distinguishing it from brain reserve by proposing that life-course exposures, rather than structural brain capacity alone, are associated with an enhanced ability to cope with underlying disease pathology and delay its clinical manifestation. In this broader conceptualization, a computer analogy is frequently applied to distinguish among these concepts, with brain reserve and the related concept of brain maintenance described as reflecting the brain's structural resources, or underlying hardware, and cognitive reserve emphasizing adaptive, experience-dependent functional processes, or software.

== Evidence for cognitive reserve ==
Cognitive reserve also indicates a resilience to neuropathological damage, but the emphasis here is on the way the brain uses its damaged resources. It could be defined as the ability to optimize or maximize performance through differential recruitment of brain networks and/or alternative cognitive strategies. This is an efficiency model, rather than a threshold model, and it implies that the task is processed using less resources or using neural resources more efficiently, resulting in better cognitive performance. Studies use factors like education, occupation, and lifestyle as proxies for cognitive reserve because they tend to positively correlate with higher cognitive reserve.

=== Education and occupation ===
More education and cognitively complex occupation are some of the factors that predict higher cognitive abilities in old age. Therefore, two most commonly used proxies to study cognitive reserve are education and occupation. Education is known to play a role in cognitive decline in normal aging, as well as in degenerative diseases or traumatic brain injuries. A higher prevalence of dementia in individuals with fewer years of education has suggested that education may protect against Alzheimer's disease. Moreover, the level of education has a strong impact on adult's lifestyle. Level of education is measured by the number of years an individual spends in school or alternatively, the degree of literacy. Possibly, the level of education itself provides a set of cognitive tools that allow the individual to compensate for the pathological changes. Cognitive Reserve Index Questionnaire (CRIq), devised to assess the level of cognitive reserve in order to provide better diagnosis and treatment, takes into account years of education and possible training courses lasting at least six months to assess the education load on cognitive reserve. Clinically, education is negatively correlated with dementia severity, but positively correlated with grey matter atrophy, intracranial volume, and overall global cognition. Neurologically, education is correlated to greater functional connectivity between frontoparietal regions and greater cortical thickness in the left inferior temporal gyrus. In addition to the level of education, it has been shown that bilingualism enhances attention and cognitive control in both children and older adults and delays the onset of dementia. It allows the brain to better tolerate the underlying pathologies and can be considered as a protective factor contributing positively to the cognitive reserve. Another proxy for cognitive reserve is the occupation. Studies suggest that occupation may provide additive and independent source of cognitive reserve throughout person's life. The last or the longest job is usually taken into account. Occupation values may vary in terms of cognitive load involved. Some other common indices, such as prestige or salary can also be considered. Working activity measured by CRIq assesses adulthood professions. There are five different levels of working activities available, differing in the degree of intellectual involvement and personal responsibility. Working activity was recorded as the number of years in each profession over the lifespan. Occupation as a proxy for cognitive reserve is positively correlated with local efficiency and functional connectivity in the right medial temporal lobe. More cognitively stimulating occupations are weakly associated with greater memory, but are more strongly correlated with greater executive functioning. These two proxies are typically measured together and are typically highly correlated with each other. A genetic study using Mendelian randomization analysis demonstrated that high occupation levels were associated with reduced risk for Alzheimer's disease. In addition, this study confirmed that occupational attainment had an independent effect on the risk for Alzheimer's disease even after taking educational attainment into account.

=== Premorbid intelligence ===
Intellectual quotients derived from psychometric testing have been identified as valuable proxy measures of cognitive reserve, with higher scores relative to the mean being associated with slower rates of cognitive decline. However, the rate of decline in some cognitive subdomains, such as processing speed, may be less affected by premorbid IQ. The degree of association between IQ and cognitive reserve may vary between different types of dementia.

=== Lifestyle ===
For any given level of clinical impairment, there is a higher degree of neuropathological change in the brains of those Alzheimer's disease sufferers who are involved in greater number of activities. This is true even when education and IQ are controlled for. This suggests that differences in lifestyle may increase cognitive reserve by making the individual more resilient. In other words, everyday experience affecting cognition is analogous to physical exercise influencing musculoskeletal and cardiovascular functions. Using cerebral blood flow as an indirect measure of neuropathological damage, lower CBF indicating more damage, it was found that at a given level of clinical impairment leisure activity score was negatively correlated with CBF. In other words, individuals with greater activity score were able to withstand more brain damage and therefore can be said to have more reserve. Mortimer et al. performed cognitive testing on a population of 678 nuns in 1997, in which they showed that different levels of cognitive activity and performance were possible in patients diagnosed with Alzheimer's. One subject showing reduced neocortical plaques survived with mild deficits, despite (or due to) low brain weight.

==== Lifestyle factors ====
More recent studies distinguish four modifiable lifestyle factors which influence cognitive health in later life and offer potential to reduce the risk of cognitive decline and dementia. Between 2011 and 2013 the Cognitive Function and Aging Study Wales (CFAS-Wales) collected data from a cohort of 2,315 cognitively healthy participants aged 65 years and over, not only confirming the theory of impacting lifestyle factors but also detecting a mediating effect of cognitive reserve on the cross-sectional association between lifestyle factors and cognitive function in later life.

===== Findings =====
A lifestyle characterized by engagement in leisure activities of an intellectual, social, and an engaging nature has been associated with slower cognitive decline in healthy seniors and leads to a significantly reduced risk of developing dementia. This includes reading magazines or newspapers or books, playing cards, games or bingo, and visiting or being visited by friends or relatives as well as helping others with daily tasks, paid work and volunteer work.

The role of physical activity in preventing dementia is uncertain, it has been observed by at least four prospective studies as being associated with a reduced risk of dementia, however other cohorts find no effect of exercise on dementia and cognitive impairment risk.

Vegetable consumption and adherence to a Mediterranean-style diet has been emphasized as protective of cognitive health in dietary research, although only oily fish consumption was identified as significant in a systematic review of risk factors.

In terms of alcohol intake, studies have reported that light-to-moderate alcohol intake is associated with lower risk than abstaining; a potential explanation is that some of the alcohol abstainers previously drank excessively and had undermined their health, and after quitting were categorized as non-drinkers. Recent research suggests that while frequent drinking earlier in life is significantly associated with increased risk of dementia compared to infrequent drinking, abstaining is not.

=== Genetic component of cognitive reserve ===
Evidence from a twin study indicates a genetic contribution to cognitive functions. Heritability estimates have been found to be high for general cognitive functions but low for memory itself. Adjusting for the effects of education 79% of executive function can be explained by genetic contribution. A study combining twin and adoption studies found all cognitive functions to be heritable. Speed of processing had the highest heritability in this particular study.

==== Parkinson's disease ====
Parkinson's disease is an example for a condition which is associated with the role of cognitive reserve and cognitive impairment. Previous investigation into Parkinson's disease implicated a possible influence of cognitive reserve in the human brain.

According to some studies the so-called Cognitive Lifestyle is seen as a general protective factor that can be mediated though several different mechanisms.

A study from 2015 included the effects of (cognitive) lifestyle on cross-sectional and longitudinal measures. 525 participants with Parkinson's disease completed different baseline assessments of cognition and provided clinical, social and demographic data. After 4 years 323 participated in a cognition assessment in the follow-up. The researchers therefore used the measures of global cognition dementia severity. It has been shown, that next to the educational level and the socio-economic status a higher level of recent social engagement was also associated with a decreased risk of dementia. On the other hand, increasing age and low levels of social engagement may increase the risk of dementia in Parkinson's disease.

== Global reserve ==
In spite of the differences in approach between the models of brain reserve and cognitive reserve, there is evidence that both might be interdependent and related. This is where the computer analogy ends, as with the brain it seems that hardware can be changed by software.

=== Neurotrophic effect of knowledge ===
Exposure to an enriched environment, defined as a combination of more opportunities for physical activity, learning and social interaction, may produce structural and functional changes in the brain and influence the rate of neurogenesis in adult and senescent animal model hippocampi. Many of these changes can be effected merely by introducing a physical exercise regimen rather than requiring cognitive activity per se.

In humans, the posterior hippocampi of licensed London taxi drivers was famously found to be larger than that of matched controls, while the anterior hippocampi were smaller. This study shows that people choosing taxi driving as a career (one which has as a barrier to entry—the ability to memorize London's streets—described as "the world's most demanding test (of street knowledge)") have larger hippocampi, but does not demonstrate change in volume as a result of driving. Similarly, while acquiring a second language requires extensive and sustained cognitive activity, it does not appear to reduce dementia risk compared to those who have not learned another language, although lifelong bilingualism is associated with delayed onset of Alzheimer's disease.

== Clinical implications ==
The clinical diagnosis of dementia is not perfectly linked to levels of underlying neuropathology. The severity of pathologies and the deficit in cognitive performance could not have direct relationship. The theory of cognitive reserve explains this phenomenon. Katzman et al. (1998) conducted a study on the autopsy results of 10 people and found a pathology related to Alzheimer's disease. However, the same patients showed no symptoms of Alzheimer's disease during their lifetime. So, when pathology emerges in the brain, cognitive reserve helps to cope with cognitive decline. Thus, individuals with high cognitive reserve cope better than those with low cognitive reserve even if they have the same pathology. This causes people with high cognitive reserve to go un-diagnosed until damage becomes severe.

Cognitive reserve, which can be estimated clinically, is affected by many variables. The Cognitive Reserve Index questionnaire (CRIq) measures cognitive reserve under three main sources, namely the education, work activities and leisure time activities throughout the individual's lifespan.

Cognitive reserve (and the variables associated with it) do not "protect" from Alzheimer's disease as a disease process—the definition of cognitive reserve is based exactly on the presence of disease pathology. This means that the traditional idea that education protects from Alzheimer's disease is false, albeit that cognitive reserve is protective of the clinical manifestations of disease. As of 2010, there was insufficient evidence to recommend any way to increase cognitive reserve to prevent dementia or Alzheimer's. On the other hand, cognitive reserve has a very important impact on neurodegenerative diseases. Patients with high cognitive reserve showed a delay in cognitive decline when compared to patients with low cognitive reserve. However, when the symptoms of cognitive decline become symptomatic, patients with high cognitive reserve show rapid cognitive decline.

The presence of cognitive reserve implies that people with greater reserve who already are suffering neuropathological changes in the brain will not be picked up by standard clinical cognitive testing. Conversely anyone who has used these instruments clinically knows that they can yield false positives in people with very low reserve. From this point of view the concept of "adequate level of challenge" easily emerges. Conceivably one could measure cognitive reserve and then offer specifically tailored tests that would pose enough level of challenge to accurately detect early cognitive impairment both in individuals with high and low reserve. This has implications for treatment and care.

In people with high reserve, deterioration occurs rapidly once the threshold is reached. In these individuals and their careers early diagnosis might provide an opportunity to plan future care and to adjust to the diagnosis while they are still able to make decisions. A cognitive rehabilitation study, conducted with dementia patients, showed that patients with low cognitive reserve had better outcomes from cognitive training rehabilitation when compared to high cognitive reserve. This is due to the fact that the patients with high cognitive reserve had delayed cognitive symptoms and therefore the disease could no longer resist the pathology. Furthermore, the improvement seen in the patients with low cognitive reserve indicates that these patients can build their cognitive reserve as a life-long process.
