= João Castel-Branco Goulão =

Portoguese addiction specialist

João Castel-Branco Goulão ComIH
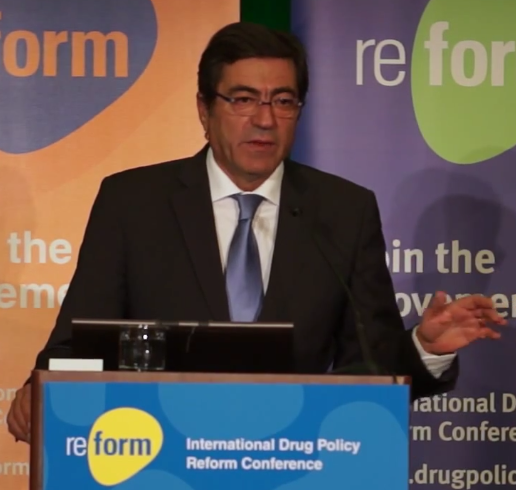

Director-General of the Service for Intervention on Addictive Behaviours and Dependencies
- Incumbent
- Assumed office 1 February 2012

Chairman of the European Monitoring Centre for Drugs and Drug Addiction
- In office 1 January 2010 – 31 December 2015
- Preceded by: Marcel Reimen
- Succeeded by: Laura d'Arrigo

City Councillor for Faro
- In office 1993–1997

Personal details
- Born: 6 May 1954 (age 72) Cernache do Bonjardim, Portugal
- Education: M.D. 1978
- Alma mater: University of Lisbon
- Occupation: Physician

João Augusto Castel-Branco Goulão ComIH (born 6 May 1954 in Cernache do Bonjardim, Portugal) is a Portuguese physician and the current national drug coordinator for Portugal. He is credited as the author of Portugal's drug policy established in 2000.

From 2009 to 2015, he served as chairman of the European Monitoring Centre for Drugs and Drug Addiction (EMCDDA) and has been a delegate at the United Nations Commission on Narcotic Drugs.

== Medical career ==
Goulão attended the University of Lisbon from 1971 to 1978, graduating from the university's Faculty of Medicine. After an internship and residency, he became a general practitioner in 1983.

Beginning in 1987, he started specialising in treatment of drug addicts. From 1988 to 1992, he worked at the Taipas Centre in Lisbon, established in 1987 by the Portuguese Ministry of Health "for the treatment, recovery and social reintegration of drug addicts."

In 1997, he became the national director of the network of drug treatment centres in Portugal. In 1998, Goulão was a member of the 11-person committee that formed the report on which Portugal's current drug policy of decriminalisation was based.

"[The committee] indicated directions in which to move with respect to policies of prevention, treatment, harm reduction and social reinsertion. One of our premises is that drug abusers are ill, not criminals, and that they need help," he said.

== Appointments ==
From 1997 to 2002, Goulão served on the scientific committee for the European Monitoring Centre for Drugs and Drug Addiction (EMCDDA), an agency of the European Union. Since 2005, he has been Portugal's representative at the agency. He served two terms as chairman of the board for EMCDDA (2009–2011 and 2012–2015).

Since 2005, Goulão has been head of the General-Directorate for Intervention on Addictive Behaviours and Dependencies (Serviço de Intervenção nos Comportamentos Adictícios e nas Dependências) (SICAD), within Portugal's Ministry of Health. He is also chairman of Portugal's Institute on Drugs and Drug Addiction (Instituto da Droga e da Toxicodependência) (IDT).

== Award and Honours ==
- Commander of the Order of Prince Henry by Portuguese President Jorge Sampaio, 2006
- Municipality of Faro, Silver Medal for Merit, 2011
- Drug Policy Alliance, Norman E. Zinberg Award for Achievement in the Field of Medicine, 2013
