= David Rosenhan =

American psychologist

- Born: David L. Rosenhan; 22 November 1929; Jersey City, New Jersey, U.S.
- Died: 6 February 2012 (aged 82); Palo Alto, California, U.S.
- Education: Yeshiva College (BA); Columbia University (MA, PhD)
- Known for: Rosenhan experiment
- Scientific career
- Fields: Psychology
- Workplaces: Swarthmore College; Princeton University; Haverford College; University of Pennsylvania; Stanford University
- Thesis: Some perceptual correlates of anxiety (1958)

David L. Rosenhan (/ˈroʊznən/ or /ˈroʊzn,hən/; November 22, 1929 – February 6, 2012) was an American psychologist. He is known best for the Rosenhan experiment, a study challenging the validity of psychiatry diagnoses.

== Biography ==
Rosenhan received his Bachelor of Arts degree in mathematics in 1951 from Yeshiva College, his master's degree in economics in 1953 and his doctorate in psychology in 1958, both from Columbia University. He was a professor of law and of psychology at Stanford University from 1971 until his retirement in 1998, and applied psychology to such legal topics as the examination of expert witnesses, jury selection, and jury deliberation. As further described in his obituary published by the American Psychological Association (APA), "Rosenhan was a pioneer in applying psychological methods to the practice of law, including the examination of expert witnesses, jury selection, and jury deliberation." He was a member of the faculties of Swarthmore College, Princeton University, Haverford College, and the University of Pennsylvania before joining the faculty of Stanford Law School. He also served as a research psychologist for the Educational Testing Service. He later became a professor emeritus of law and psychology at Stanford University. Rosenhan was a fellow of the American Association for the Advancement of Science and various psychological societies, including the APA, and had been a visiting fellow at Wolfson College at Oxford University.

Rosenhan died on February 6, 2012, at the age of 82.

== Research ==
Rosenhan believed that there are seven main features of psychological abnormality: suffering; maladaptiveness; vividness and unconventionality; unpredictability and loss of control; irrationality and incomprehensibility; observer discomfort; and violation of moral and ideal standards.

In 1973, Rosenhan published "On Being Sane In Insane Places", which describes what is now known as the Rosenhan experiment. In this study report, Rosenhan uses "hard labeling" to argue that mental illnesses are manifested solely as a result of societal influence. The study experiments arranged for eight individuals with no history of psychopathology to attempt admission into twelve psychiatric hospitals, all with the purpose of obtaining admission with a diagnosis of schizophrenia or bipolar disorder. The report describes psychiatrists then attempting to treat the individuals using psychiatric medications; all eight were described as being self-discharged within 7 to 52 days, with an average stay of 19 days, after having stated that they accepted their diagnosis. Later, a research and teaching hospital challenged Rosenhan to perform a similar experiment involving its own diagnosis and admission procedures, where psychiatric staff were warned that at least one pseudo-patient might be sent to their institution. In that study, 41 out of 193 new patients were believed by at least one staff member to be actors; in fact, Rosenhan reports not having sent any actors. From the results of his experiment, Rosenhan concluded that, "It is clear that we cannot distinguish the sane from the insane in psychiatric hospitals". Thus, that existing forms of diagnosis were grossly inaccurate in distinguishing individuals without mental disorders from those with mental disorders, a conclusion that resulted in great controversy.

The Rosenhan experiment can be described as addressing the relationship between psychiatric and medical diagnoses and labeling theory, theorising that deviance is a product of external judgements that can modify an individual's self-identity and change how others respond to the labeled person. By this description, by negatively labeling those seen as deviant from standard cultural norms, the behavior of individuals may be adjusted to coincide with the terms used to describe them. In short, by actively labeling certain acts as deviant and others as normal, distinct stereotypes are created.

=== Criticism of research ===
External videos
- Q&A interview with Susannah Cahalan on The Great Pretender, November 10, 2019, C-SPAN

In a 2019 book on Rosenhan by author Susannah Cahalan, The Great Pretender, the veracity and validity of the Rosenhan experiment were questioned; Cahalan argues that Rosenhan never published further work on the experiment's data, nor did he produce a book on it that he had promised. Moreover, she presents her inability to find the experiment's subjects, save two – a Stanford graduate student who had experiences similar to Rosenhan's, and one whose positive psychiatric hospital experience was excluded from the published results. As noted by Alison Abbott in a review of the book in the journal Nature, Kenneth J. Gergen, a Stanford University colleague stated that "some people in the department called him a bullshitter", a conclusion with which Cahalan appeared to be in agreement, although, Abbott writes, "[s]he cannot be completely certain that Rosenhan cheated. But she is confident enough to call her engrossing, dismaying book The Great Pretender."

Subsequent pseudo-patient studies similar to that of Rosenhan have had significant methodologic and other concerns.

== Publications ==
- David L. Rosenhan (1953). Consumer Subsidies as a Counter-cycle Measure.
- David L. Rosenhan; Silvan S. Tomkins (1964). On Preference for Hypnosis and Hypnotizability. Educational Testing Service.
- David L. Rosenhan; Samuel Messick (1964). Affect and Expectation. Educational Testing Service.
- David L. Rosenhan (1966). Double Alternation in Children's Binary Choice Responses. Educational Testing Service.
- David L. Rosenhan (1966). Aloness and Togetherness as Drive Conditions in Children.
- David L. Rosenhan (1968). Some Origins of Concern for Others. Educational Testing Service.
- David L. Rosenhan; William Ross Ashby (1968). Foundations of abnormal psychology. Holt, Rinehart and Winston. ISBN 9780030561603.
- Christopher Peterson; David L. Rosenhan; Lisa M. Bossio; Martin E. P. Seligman (1989). Casebook and Study Guide, Abnormal Psychology. W W Norton & Company Incorporated. ISBN 978-0393956986.
- David L. Rosenhan (1998). Abnormality-Trans. W. W. Norton, Incorporated. ISBN 978-0393972405.
- Rosenhan DL (August 1962). "Naysaying and the California Psychological Inventory". Journal of Consulting Psychology. 26 (4): 382–383. doi:10.1037/h0043264. PMID 14494017.
- Rosenhan DL (September 1966). "Effects of social class and race on responsiveness to approval and disapproval". Journal of Personality and Social Psychology. 4 (3): 253–259. doi:10.1037/h0023703. PMID 5969153.
- Rosenhan DL (October 1975). "The contextual nature of psychiatric diagnosis". Journal of Abnormal Psychology. 84 (5): 462–474. doi:10.1037/h0077123. PMID 1194507.
