= Johann Hari =

Scottish writer (born 1979)

- Hari (2022)
- Born: Johann Eduard Hari; 21 January 1979 (age 47); Glasgow, Scotland
- Citizenship: United Kingdom; Switzerland
- Education: King's College, Cambridge
- Occupation: Writer
- Notable work: Chasing the Scream
- Website: johannhari.com

Johann Eduard Hari (born 21 January 1979) is a British writer and journalist. Until 2011, Hari wrote for The Independent, among other outlets, before resigning after admitting to plagiarism and fabrications dating back to 2001 and making malicious edits to the Wikipedia pages of journalists who had criticised his conduct. He has since written books on the topics of depression, the war on drugs, the effect of technology on attention span, and anti-obesity medication.

== Early life ==
Hari was born in Glasgow, Scotland, to a Scottish mother and Swiss father. His family relocated to London when he was an infant. His father was a bus driver and mother a nurse. Later, his mother worked in shelters for survivors of domestic violence. Hari said he was physically abused in his childhood by an unnamed adult while his father was away and his mother was ill.

Hari attended the John Lyon School, an independent school affiliated with Harrow, and then Woodhouse College, a state sixth form in Finchley. He graduated from King's College, Cambridge, in 2001 with a double first in Social and Political Sciences.

== Early career ==
After university, he joined the New Statesman, where he worked between 2001 and 2003, and then wrote two columns a week for The Independent. At the 2003 Press Gazette Awards, he won Young Journalist of the Year. A play by Hari, Going Down in History, was performed at the Garage Theatre in Edinburgh, and his book God Save the Queen? was published by Icon Books in 2002. Hari supported the Iraq War. In 2009, he was named by The Daily Telegraph as one of the most influential people on the left in Britain.

== 2011 plagiarism, fabrication and misconduct scandal ==
=== Plagiarism ===
In June 2011, bloggers at Deterritorial Support Group, as well as Yahoo! Ireland editor Brian Whelan, discovered that Hari had plagiarised material published in other interviews and writings by his interview subjects. For example, a 2009 interview with Afghan women's rights activist Malalai Joya included quotations from her book Raising My Voice in a manner that made them appear as if spoken directly to Hari. A piece entitled "How Multiculturalism Is Betraying Women" which Hari submitted when entering the Orwell Prize was plagiarised from Der Spiegel.

Hari initially denied any wrongdoing, stating that the unattributed quotes were for clarification and did not present someone else's thoughts as his own. However, he later said that his behaviour was "completely wrong" and that "when I interviewed people, I often presented things that had been said to other journalists or had been written in books as if they had been said to me, which was not truthful." Hari was suspended for two months from The Independent and in January 2012 it was announced that he was leaving the newspaper.

The Media Standards Trust instructed the council of the Orwell Prize, who had given their 2008 prize to Hari, to examine the allegations. The council concluded that "the article contained inaccuracies and conflated different parts of someone else's story" and did not meet the standards of Orwell Prize-winning journalism. Hari returned the prize, though he did not return the prize money of £2,000. He later offered to repay the sum, but Political Quarterly, which had paid the prize money, instead invited him to make a donation to English PEN. Hari arranged with English PEN to make a donation equal to the value of the prize, to be paid in installments when he returned to work at The Independent, but he did not return to work there.

=== Fabrication and misrepresentation ===
As early as 2000, Hari was criticised by Ben Elton in the letters page of Varsity for inaccuracies including stating that only Jews can be Israeli citizens. In addition to plagiarism, Hari was found to have fabricated elements of stories. In one of the stories for which he won the 2008 Orwell Prize, he reported on atrocities in the Central African Republic, stating that French soldiers told him that "Children would bring us the severed heads of their parents and scream for help, but our orders were not to help them." However, an NGO worker who translated for Hari said that the quotation was invented and that Hari exaggerated the extent of the devastation in the CAR. In his apology after his plagiarism was exposed, Hari said that other staff of the NGO had supported his version of events.

In a 2010 article about military robots, Hari falsely claimed that former Japanese prime minister Junichiro Koizumi was attacked by a factory robot and was nearly killed. Hari falsely claimed that a large globe erected for the Copenhagen climate summit was "covered with corporate logos" for McDonald's and Carlsberg, with "the Coke brand ... stamped over Africa". Private Eye's Hackwatch column also suggested that he pretended to have used the drug ecstasy and misrepresented a two-week package tour in Iraq as a one-month research visit, in order to bolster support for the Iraq war by stating that Iraqi civilians he spoke to were in favour of an invasion, although in an earlier article he had given a conflicting account stating that Iraqis were reticent about their opinions.

While Hari was working at the New Statesman, the deputy editor, Cristina Odone, doubted the authenticity of quotations in a story he wrote. When she asked to see his notebooks, he said that he had lost them. After discovering that Hari had lost a position at the Cambridge student newspaper for allegedly unethical behaviour, Odone went to the New Statesman editor, Peter Wilby, but without result. Odone subsequently found that her Wikipedia entry had been altered by Hari, using his sock puppet account of "David Rose", to falsely accuse her of homophobia and anti-Semitism. Hari has been accused of misrepresenting writing by George Galloway, Eric Hobsbawm, Nick Cohen and Noam Chomsky.

=== Malicious contributions on Wikipedia ===
In September 2011, Hari admitted that he had edited articles on Wikipedia about himself and journalists with whom he had had disputes. Using a sock puppet account under the name "David r from meth productions", he added false and defamatory claims to articles about journalists including Nick Cohen, Cristina Odone, Francis Wheen, Andrew Roberts, Niall Ferguson and Oliver Kamm, and edited the article about himself "to make him seem one of the essential writers of our times".

In July 2011, Cohen wrote about the suspicious Wikipedia editing in The Spectator, prompting the New Statesman journalist David Allen Green to compile evidence that Hari used the identity "David Rose" to pretend to be an editor who was qualified in environmental science. This led to an investigation by the Wikipedia community and "David Rose" was blocked from Wikipedia. Hari published an apology in The Independent, admitting that he had been "David Rose" and writing: "I edited the entries of people I had clashed with in ways that were juvenile or malicious: I called one of them anti-Semitic and homophobic, and the other a drunk. I am mortified to have done this, because it breaches the most basic ethical rule: don't do to others what you don't want them to do to you. I apologise to the latter group unreservedly and totally."

=== Use of libel law to suppress criticism ===
Hari used threats of suing for libel to prevent critics revealing his misrepresentations. After British bloggers criticised his critique of Nick Cohen's What's Left: How Liberals Lost Their Way for factual and interpretive errors, Hari used libel law against a blogger who wrote that "a reputation for making things up should spell career death", leading to the blogger removing the post.

== Later career ==
=== Chasing the Scream (2015) ===
Chasing the Scream: The First and Last Days of the War on Drugs was published in the UK on January 15th, 2015, followed by the US on January 20th the same month. Chasing the Scream critiques the global prohibition of illicit narcotics. Hari argued that most addictions are functional responses to experiences and a lack of healthy supportive relationships, rather than a simple biological need for a particular substance.

Due to the previous scandals, Hari put the audio of some interviews conducted for Chasing the Scream online. Writer Jeremy Duns criticised instances where quotes were inaccurately transcribed or misrepresented, stating that out of a sample of dozens of clips, "in almost all cases, words in quotes had been changed or omitted without being noted, often for no apparent purpose, but in several cases to subtly change the narrative." In a review for New Matilda, Michael Brull expressed reservations about Hari's citational practices and highlighted contradictions between the narrative in Chasing the Scream and a 2009 article by Hari. For newer UK editions, the subtitle has been changed: Chasing the Scream: The Search for the Truth About Addiction.

=== Lost Connections (2018) ===
Lost Connections was published in the US and UK on January 23rd, 2018. In Lost Connections, Hari argues that depression and related mental health conditions are not solely caused by chemical imbalances in the brain, instead being rooted in social, environmental, and psychological factors. Hari emphasizes that someone who finds benefits in taking an anti-depressant medication should not stop taking them.

Kirkus Reviews praised Lost Connections. In one of The Guardian's reviews of the book, arts writer Fiona Sturges alluded to Hari's earlier examples of journalism malpractice that date to his earlier period as a newspaper reporter. She noted that in contrast, Hari made notes and interview recordings for Lost Connection available. Lost Connections has been translated into German, Japanese, and Spanish.

The original UK and US releases of Lost Connections have different subtitles. The full title of the UK edition reads: Lost Connections: Why You're Depressed and How to Find Hope, while the US edition reads: Lost Connections: Uncovering the Real Causes of Depression - and the Unexpected Solutions.

=== Stolen Focus (2022) ===
Stolen Focus: Why You Can't Pay Attention was published in the UK on January 6th, 2022, followed by the US on January 25th the same month. In Stolen Focus, Hari argues that elements of modern lifestyles, including smart phones and social media, are "destroying our ability to concentrate." The book also discusses opinions on chronic stress, a decrease in outdoor play among children, and the potential effect of ultra-processed foods on brain functions. Stolen Focus debuted at number seven on the New York Times nonfiction best-seller list for the week ending 12 February 2022.

The original UK and US releases of Stolen Focus have different subtitles. The full title of the UK edition reads: Stolen Focus: Why You Can't Pay Attention, while the US edition continues this subtitle: Stolen Focus: Why You Can't Pay Attention—and How to Think Deeply Again.

=== Magic Pill (2024) ===
Magic Pill: The Extraordinary Benefits and Disturbing Risks of the New Weight Loss Drugs, Hari's first-person account of taking the weight loss drug Ozempic (semaglutide), was published in 2024. The book also documents the history of the medication. According to Hari, while there are health benefits to taking Ozempic for some users, there are also potential risks.

Hari falsely claimed in Magic Pill that restaurant critic Jay Rayner had taken semaglutide and the book included false statements about Rayner's opinion of the drug. Rayner had previously written that he would never take the drug, and described Hari's description as "very much defamatory". Hari apologized for the error. In a review for The Guardian, science writer Tom Chivers found several misuses of references that did not support the book's claims, as well as scientific inaccuracies. A fact check by The Daily Telegraph found six examples of "errors, outdated data and disputed claims". Hari said these errors would be corrected in future editions. Magic Pill has been translated into French and Russian.

== Other projects ==
Hari is listed as a producer and writer on the 2021 film The United States vs. Billie Holiday. As of April 2018, Hari was working on a biography of American linguist and intellectual Noam Chomsky.

== Awards ==
- Student News Journalist of the Year by The Times, 2000
- Young Journalist of the Year at the British Press Awards, 2003
- Newspaper Journalist of the Year at Amnesty International Media Awards, 2007, for the article The Dark Side of Dubai
- Orwell Prize for political journalism, 2008 (withdrawn 2011)
- Journalist of the Year at the Stonewall Awards, 2009
- Newspaper Journalist of the Year at Amnesty International Media Awards, 2010, for the article Congo's tragedy: The War the World Forgot
- Martha Gellhorn Prize for Journalism, 2010

== See also ==
- Journalism scandals

== Books ==
- Johann Hari (2002). God Save the Queen?. Icon Books. ISBN 978-1-84046-401-6.
- Johann Hari (2015). Chasing the Scream: The First and Last Days of the War on Drugs. Bloomsbury. ISBN 978-1-62040-890-2.
- Johann Hari (2018). Lost Connections: Uncovering the Real Causes of Depression – and the Unexpected Solutions. Bloomsbury. ISBN 978-1-63286-830-5.
- Johann Hari (2021). Stolen Focus: Why You Can't Pay Attention. Bloomsbury. ISBN 978-1-5266-2022-4.
- Johann Hari (2024). Magic Pill: The Extraordinary Benefits and Disturbing Risks of the New Weight Loss Drugs. Bloomsbury. ISBN 978-1-52667015.
