= Rat Park =

Housing facility for rodents

Rat Park was a series of studies into drug addiction conducted in the late 1970s and published between 1978 and 1981 by Canadian psychologist Bruce K. Alexander and his colleagues at Simon Fraser University in British Columbia, Canada.

At the time of the studies, research exploring the self-administration of morphine in animals often used small, solitary metal cages. Alexander hypothesized that these conditions may be responsible for exacerbating self-administration. To test this hypothesis, Alexander and his colleagues built Rat Park, a large housing colony 200 times the floor area of a standard laboratory cage. There were 16–20 rats of both sexes in residence, food, balls and wheels for play, and enough space for mating. The results of the experiment appeared to support his hypothesis that improved housing conditions reduce the consumption of morphine water. This research highlighted an important issue in the design of morphine self-administration studies of the time, namely the use of austere housing conditions, which confound the results.

== Rat Park experiments ==
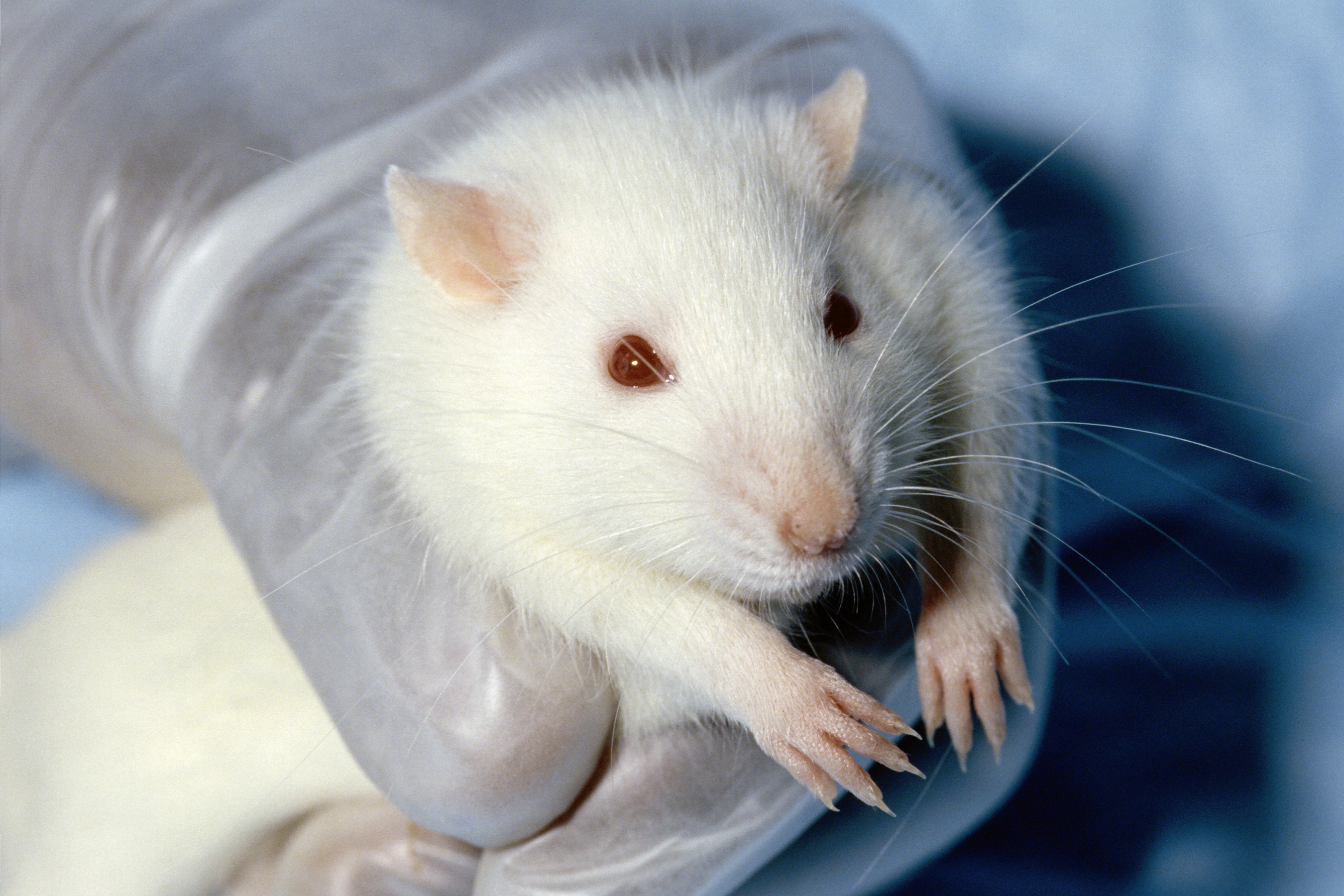
A white Wistar lab rat

In Rat Park, the rats could drink a fluid from one of two drop dispensers, which automatically recorded how much each rat drank. One dispenser contained a sweetened morphine solution and the other plain tap water. Morphine solution was sweetened to reduce aversion to the taste of morphine; as a control, prior to morphine introduction, rats were offered a sweetened quinine solution instead.

Alexander designed a number of experiments to test the rats' willingness to consume the morphine. The Seduction Experiment involved four groups of 8 rats. Group CC was isolated in laboratory cages when they were weaned at 22 days of age, and lived there until the experiment ended at 80 days of age; Group PP was housed in Rat Park for the same period; Group CP was moved from laboratory cages to Rat Park at 65 days of age; and Group PC was moved out of Rat Park and into cages at 65 days of age.

The caged rats (Groups CC and PC) took to the morphine instantly, even with relatively little sweetener, with the caged males drinking 19 times more morphine than the Rat Park males in one of the experimental conditions. The rats in Rat Park resisted the morphine water. They would try it occasionally—with the females trying it more often than the males—but they showed a statistically significant preference for the plain water. He writes that the most interesting group was Group CP, the rats who were brought up in cages but moved to Rat Park before the experiment began. These animals rejected the morphine solution when it was stronger, but as it became sweeter and more dilute, they began to drink almost as much as the rats that had lived in cages throughout the experiment. They wanted the sweet water, he concluded, so long as it did not disrupt their normal social behavior.

In another experiment, he forced rats in ordinary lab cages to consume the morphine-laced solution for 57 days without other liquid available to drink. When they moved into Rat Park, they were allowed to choose between the morphine solution and plain water. They drank the plain water. He writes that they did show some signs of dependence. There were "some minor withdrawal signs, twitching, what have you, but there were none of the mythic seizures and sweats you so often hear about ..."

The authors concluded that isolated cages, as well as female sex, caused an increased consumption of morphine. The authors advised that it is important to consider the conditions of testing, as well as the sex of the animals, when exploring self-administration of morphine.

== Further experiments ==
Studies that followed up on the contribution of environmental enrichment to addiction produced mixed results. A replication study found that both caged and "park" rats showed a decreased preference for morphine compared to Alexander's original study; the author suggested a genetic reason for the difference Alexander initially observed. Another study found that while social isolation can influence levels of heroin self-administration, isolation is not a necessary condition for heroin or cocaine injections to be reinforcing.

Other studies have reinforced the effect of environmental enrichment on self-administration, such as one that showed it reduced re-instatement of cocaine-seeking behavior in mice through cues (though not if that re-instatement was induced by cocaine itself) and another that showed it can eliminate previously established addiction-related behaviors. Furthermore, removing mice from enriched environments has been shown to increase vulnerability to cocaine addiction and exposure to complex environments during early stages of life produced dramatic changes in the reward system of the brain that resulted in reduced effects of cocaine.

Broadly speaking, there is mounting evidence that the impoverished small-cage environments that are standard for the housing of laboratory animals have undue influence on lab animal behavior and biology. These conditions can jeopardize both a basic premise of biomedical research—that healthy control animals are healthy—and the relevance of these kinds of animal studies to human conditions.

== Criticisms ==
=== Replication ===
Bruce Petrie (1996), a graduate student of Alexander's, attempted to replicate the study and correct for the original studies on 20 rats using two different methods for measuring morphine consumption between conditions (which introduced a potential confound). The study was not able to replicate the results. The author suggested that strain differences between the rats that Alexander's research group used could be the reason.

There has been little subsequent interest in replicating the studies due to several methodological issues present in the originals. Issues included the small number of subjects used, the use of oral morphine, which does not mimic actual conditions of use (and introduces a confound because of the bitterness of morphine), and the measurement of morphine consumption, which differed between conditions. Other problems included equipment failures, lost data and rat deaths. However, some researchers have shown an interest in "conceptual" replication to continue exploring the contribution of environmental and social enrichment to addiction.

=== Media interpretation ===
Journalist Johann Hari gave a popular TED Talk about the results of the study in 2015. He interpreted Alexander's study as suggesting that biological underpinnings are not the cause of addiction, instead shifting the etiology to a lack of healthy relationships. The YouTube channel Kurzgesagt created and published a video based on Hari's book, which garnered over 19 million views. The channel later took down the video, stating that they improperly represented the evidence.

Researchers have reiterated that the results of Alexander's studies highlight concerns about observations of rats kept in bare-bones lab environments, and may implicate the environment as a contributing factor in addiction. However, it is suggested that the media has overstated the studies' importance by suggesting it represents a total paradigm shift in addiction research, since it is a mistake to conclude from the study that the environment is the only factor in addiction.

== See also ==
- Behavioral sink
- Effect of psychoactive drugs on animals
- Konrad Lorenz
