= Bruce K. Alexander =

Canadian psychologist (born 1939)

- Born: Bruce K. Alexander; 20 December 1939 (age 86)
- Occupations: Psychologist and professor
- Awards: In 2007, Alexander received the Nora and Ted Sterling Prize in Support of Controversy from Simon Fraser University.; In 2011, he was invited to present at the Royal Society of Arts and Manufactures in London.

Bruce K. Alexander (born 20 December 1939) is a psychologist and professor emeritus from Vancouver, BC, Canada. He has taught and conducted research on the psychology of addiction at Simon Fraser University since 1970. He retired from active teaching in 2005. Alexander and SFU colleagues conducted a series of experiments into drug addiction known as the Rat Park experiments. He has written two books about addiction: Peaceful Measures: Canada's Way Out of the War on Drugs (1990) and The Globalization of Addiction: A Study in Poverty of the Spirit (2008).

== Rat Park ==
The "Rat Park" experiments were published in the journal Psychopharmacology in the late 1970s and early 1980s. Alexander and his colleagues found that the rats in their study that were housed in isolation consumed more morphine than the rats in the rat park colony. Further studies by other researchers failed to reproduce the original experiment's results. One of those studies found that both caged and "park" rats showed a decreased preference for morphine, suggesting a genetic difference. Other studies have supported the conclusions, finding that environmental enrichment induces neurological changes that would serve to decrease the chances of opiate addiction Alexander's work laid the groundwork for a body of work in rodents on the social influences on addiction.

== Writings and views ==
Alexander then explored the broader implications of Rat Park experiments for human beings. The main conclusions of his experimental and historical research since 1985 can be summarized as follows:

1. Drug addiction is only a small corner of the addiction problem. Most serious addictions do not involve either drugs or alcohol
2. Addiction is more a social problem than an individual problem. When socially integrated societies are fragmented by internal or external forces, addiction of all sorts increases dramatically, becoming almost universal in extremely fragmented societies.
3. Addiction arises in fragmented societies because people use it as a way of adapting to extreme social dislocation. As a form of adaptation, addiction is neither a disease that can be cured nor a moral error that can be corrected by punishment and education.

In 2014, Alexander published the book A History of Psychology in Western Civilization.

== Awards and recognition ==
In 2007, Alexander received the Nora and Ted Sterling Prize in Support of Controversy from Simon Fraser University. In 2011, he was invited to present at the Royal Society of Arts and Manufactures in London.
