= L-701324 =

NMDA receptor antagonist acting at the glycine site

Names
- IUPAC name 7-Chloro-4-hydroxy-3-(3-phenoxyphenyl)-1H-quinolin-2-one

Identifiers
CAS Number	142326-59-8
3D model (JSmol)	Interactive image
ChEBI	CHEBI:92140
ChEMBL	ChEMBL31741
ChemSpider	103009.html : 103009
ECHA InfoCard	100.162.301
EC Number	634-309-2
IUPHAR/BPS	4240
PubChem CID	54682505
UNII	I9WY146163
CompTox Dashboard (EPA)	DTXSID00162016
- InChI: InChI=1S/C21H14ClNO3/c22-14-9-10-17-18(12-14)23-21(25)19(20(17)24)13-5-4-8-16(11-13)26-15-6-2-1-3-7-15/h1-12H,(H2,23,24,25) Key: FLVRDMUHUXVRET-UHFFFAOYSA-N
- SMILES: C1=CC=C(C=C1)OC2=CC=CC(=C2)C3=C(C4=C(C=C(C=C4)Cl)NC3=O)O

Properties
Chemical formula	C_{21}H_{14}ClNO_{3}
Molar mass	363.80 g·mol^{−1}

Hazards
- GHS labelling
Pictograms	(GHS07: Exclamation mark)
Signal word	Warning
Hazard statements	H315, H319, H335
Precautionary statements	P261, P264, P264+P265, P271, P280, P302+P352, P304+P340, P305+P351+P338, P319, P321, P332+P317, P337+P317, P362+P364, P403+P233, P405, P501
- Except where otherwise noted, data are given for materials in their standard state (at 25 °C [77 °F], 100 kPa). Infobox references

L-701324 is an antagonist of the NMDA receptor. It appears to have activity in animal models of depression.

== Pharmacology ==
L-701324 appears to be an antagonist of the NMDA receptor and acts at the glycine binding site. This means that it prevents the receptor from activating by blocking the binding of glycine, a required co-agonist in addition to glutamate.

== Potential use as an antidepressant ==
L-701324 exhibited antidepressant behavior in mice by reducing depression-like behavior caused by the forced swimming test, the tail suspension test, and the chronic unpredictable mild stress model.

In another animal study, a combination of an adenosine receptor antagonist, such as caffeine, with an NMDA receptor antagonist, such as L-701324, showed a synergistic effect that might have use as an antidepressant.
