= WCOC =

Dora, Alabama; United States
- Broadcast area: Birmingham, Alabama
- Frequency: 1010 kHz

Programming
- Format: Regional Mexican

Ownership
- Owner: Azteca Communications of Alabama, Inc.

History
- First air date: 1982
- Last air date: 2011
- Former call signs: WPYK (1979–1987); WDLE (1987–1988); WPYK (1988–2002)

Technical information
- Facility ID: 51932
- Class: D
- Power: 5,000 watts (day); 41 watts (night)
- Transmitter coordinates: 33°48′04″N 87°06′42″W

WCOC (1010 AM) was a radio station licensed to the community of Dora, Alabama, United States, and serving the greater Birmingham, Alabama, area. The station is owned by Azteca Communications of Alabama, Inc. It aired a Regional Mexican music format but as of August 2011 shut down operations due to "financial difficulties".

== History ==
=== Launch ===
On May 24, 1979, the Federal Communications Commission granted a construction permit for a new standard broadcast station at 1010 kHz with 500 watts of power, daytime only. On November 24, 1980, the permit was modified to allow a maximum power of 5,000 watts. After several extensions, and nearly five years after the initial application was filed in June 1977, the FCC granted WPYK a license to cover on April 28, 1982.

=== 1980s and 1990s ===
In April 1985, Mid-Way Radio reached an agreement to sell this station to James O. Powell (trading as JASCO). The deal was approved by the FCC on May 17, 1985, and after a significant delay the transaction was finally consummated on April 11, 1986. The same day, April 11, 1986, James O. Powell (trading as JASCO) reached an agreement to sell this station to Earl Fisher. The deal was approved by the FCC on May 20, 1986, and the transaction was consummated on May 30, 1986. The new owners petitioned the FCC to change the station's call letters to WDLE on November 30, 1987. On June 4, 1988, the station had its call letters changed back to WPYK.

In August 1988, Earl Fisher reached an agreement to sell this station to Casey & Perkins Broadcasting. The deal was approved by the FCC on October 3, 1988. In January 1990, Casey & Perkins Broadcasting reached an agreement to sell this station to Paul Tate Johnson. The deal was approved by the FCC on April 2, 1990, and the transaction was consummated on June 20, 1990.

=== 2000s ===
In December 2001, Paul Tate Johnson reached an agreement to sell this station to Azteca Communications of Alabama, Inc (Javier Macias, owner). The station was sold for a reported $190,000. The deal was approved by the FCC on February 12, 2002, and the transaction was consummated on April 4, 2002. The new owners had the station's call letters changed by the FCC to WCOC on April 4, 2002.

At the time of the sale, Javier Macias owned three other radio stations: WAZX and WAZX-FM serving Atlanta, Georgia, and WGTA near Rome, Georgia. Together, these stations were operated as a network under the branding "Radio La Que Buena" featuring Regional Mexican music and other Spanish-language programming, including Atlanta Braves baseball broadcasts.

=== Falling silent ===
On November 28, 2007, the station informed the FCC that it would be going off the air on December 1, 2007, due to "financial difficulties being experienced by the licensee." The application noted that the station would resume broadcast operations "following a reassessment of station operations to determine a means to improve station revenues" and requested authority to stay silent pending this reassessment. On September 26, 2008, the station filed for an extension of this temporary stay silent authority. The September 2008 filing also states that negotiations were then in progress for the sale of this radio station. On November 19, 2008, the FCC granted the requested extension with a scheduled expiration date of May 18, 2009.

The station resumed broadcasting on November 25, 2008, but fell silent again just days later on November 29, 2008. They belatedly informed the FCC in July 2009 during their request for authority to remain silent. The FCC granted the request on September 17, 2009, with a November 28, 2009, expiration date. The station reported that they resumed broadcasting on November 28, 2009, ending nearly two years of silence. If the station had been continuously silent for a full year, the broadcast license would have been subject to forfeiture and cancellation.

=== Deletion ===
After more than 20 months of regular operation, WCOC fell silent again on August 12, 2011. In their November 2011 request for authority to remain silent, the license holder cited "financial difficulties" as the reason for taking the station off the air. The FCC granted this authority on January 4, 2012, with a July 2, 2012, scheduled expiration. On November 3, 2014, WCOC's license was turned in to the FCC.
