= WGTA =

WGTA may refer to:

- WGTA (TV), a television station (channel 24/PSIP 32) licensed to serve Toccoa, Georgia, United States
- WGTA (AM), a former radio station (950 AM) licensed to serve Summerville, Georgia, United States
- Wisconsin General Test Apparatus, a piece of laboratory equipment used to test learning in primates
