= Light-dark box test =

Animal behavioural test

The light-dark box test (LDB) is a popular animal model used in pharmacology to assay unconditioned anxiety responses in rodents. The extent to which behavior in the LDB measures anxiety is controversial.

== Overview ==
The LDB apparatus has two compartments. The light compartment is 2/3 of the box and is brightly lit and open. The dark compartment is 1/3 of the total box and is covered and dark. A door of 7 cm connects the two compartments.

Rodents prefer darker areas over lighter areas. However, when presented in a novel environment, rodents have a tendency to explore. These two conflicting emotions lead to observable anxiety like symptoms.

Rodents typically spend more time in the dark compartment than in the light compartment (scototaxis). If rodents are injected with anxiolytic drugs, percentage of time spent in the light compartment will increase. Locomotion and rearing, which is when the rodent stands up on its hind legs and is a sign of exploration, in the dark compartment also increase. When injected with anxiogenic drugs, more time is spent in the dark compartment.

The LDB does not require any prior training. No food or water is deprived and only natural stressors such as light are used.

== Procedure ==
Rodents are placed in the light compartment of the apparatus and are allowed to move around. Typically rodents will move around the periphery of the compartment until they find the door. This process can take between 7–12 seconds. All four paws must be placed into the opposite chamber to be considered an entry.

== Controversy ==
As with all animal models there is significant controversy about the LDB. The only drug class that has shown consistent results are the benzodiazepines. When other anti-anxiety drugs such as SSRIs have been tested contradicting observations have been noted questioning its validity.

Different labs account variable results due to the differences between the type and severity of external stressors. Baseline levels in the control group which are key in determining the exploratory activity can vary due to strain, age, and weight.

The LDB has not been validated for female rodents.

The LDB can give too many false positives. A drug that has anxiolytic properties and increased locomotion properties cannot be accurately tested in the LDB. Increased locomotion effects can affect the percentage of time spent in the compartments and rearing. Preliminary screening for locomotor effects is needed to determine a false positive results.

Due to the flaws in animal modeling the LDB is best done in a battery of anxiety modeling tests with high predictive validity to determine the potential therapeutic value of a novel agent.

== See also ==
- Elevated plus maze
- Open Field Test
- Marble Burying
- Morris Water Navigation Task
- Animal Models of Depression
