= WAZX =

WAZX may refer to:

- WAZX (AM), a radio station (1550 AM) licensed to Smyrna, Georgia, United States
- WAZX-FM, a radio station (101.9 FM) licensed to Cleveland, Georgia, United States
