= Vogel conflict test =

The Vogel conflict test (VCT) is a conflict based experimental method primarily used in pharmacology. It is used to determine anxiolytic properties of drugs. The VCT predicts drugs that can manage generalized anxiety disorders and acute anxiety states.

== Conditioning ==
Suppressing behaviour through punishment is commonly used to determine the anxiolytic properties of drugs. During the VCT, animals are punished by electrical shocks when trying to get either food or water. Therefore, the number of times the animal goes to get food or water decreases. When anxiolytic drugs are injected, the number of times animals go up to get food or water increases, even though the animal will still be punished.

== Procedure ==
Mouse Operant Conditioning Chamber with Food Dispenser

Experiments are done in a mouse operant conditioning chamber. Conditioning chambers are used to train animals to do simple tasks such as pulling a lever or pushing a button. The animals can be rewarded or punished for doing these tasks.

The original method by VCT included 48 hours of water deprivation and then a mild electrical shock every 20 licks when finally given water. Modern versions of the test are less severe. Water deprivation is 18 hours or water is provided for 1 hour a day for four days before beginning the test. Electrical shock is only given for a 3-5 minute time period.

The VCT can be done with food deprivation too. Before beginning the test animals must be acclimated to the cage and food pellets. The conditioning chamber must be checked to ensure everything is in working order. On Day 1 animals are placed in the conditioning chamber. Whenever the animal pulls the lever, a food pellet will drop. This takes place for 8 hours. Then the animal is placed back in its cage. Any animal that is unable to eat 15 or more food pellets is either removed from the experiment or receives further training,

In Day 2 the animal is injected with saline and then placed back into the conditioning chamber. It is placed there and observed for 1 hour. On Day 3 animals are injected with the agent being tested. They are divided into two groups. One group is taken one by one and placed in the chamber. When they push the lever, they will receive a mild electrical shock. The other group is also placed in the apparatus but does not receive an electrical shock when they push the lever.

The group that is injected with the agent but not shocked sets a baseline for the experiment. Dose dependent responses can be tested using the baseline.

Following long term administration of the agent, animals should be observed to determine any potential rebound or withdrawal effects.

== Criticisms ==
Since conditions such as anxiety are idiopathic, animal models are difficult to create and therefore flawed. However animal models can be pharmacologically validated by usually by benzodiazepines, a common anti anxiety medication. Other drugs that are known to treat anxiety such as SSRIs which theoretically increase number of responses, show no effect in the VCT.

The VCT can give false positives. If the shock the animals are receiving is too low, then animals might ignore the shock and continue to get food or water which can skew results. Drugs that increase thirst or appetite can give inconsistent results.

Animal training can take time. If doing the VCT using food, animals must be trained to be able to pull the lever for the food dispenser and accept the pellet. If using water, animals must be trained to be able to push the button and drink water. Because of this, etiological tests which observe spontaneous fears are usually preferred by researchers. Lab personnel must be trained to avoid injury or disease to the animals.

Animal housing has well known effects on stress. The original Vogel study did not specify if animals were group housed or individually housed. Modern studies therefore use both types of housing which can have different results.

Different animal models can show different anxiety results. Animals can show high levels of anxiety in one test and low levels in a different test. The VCT, which measures anxiety through decreased consumption, cannot be compared directly to tests such as the open field or plus maze that measure anxiety through locomotion activity.

== See also ==
- Behavioural despair test
- Learned helplessness
- Open field (animal test)
- Tail suspension test
