= Kuenne =

Kuenne is a surname. Notable people with the surname include:

- Kurt Kuenne (born 1973), American filmmaker and composer
- Margaret Kuenne Harlow, nee Margaret Kuenne (1918–1971), American developmental psychologist
