= Harry Harlow =

American psychologist (1905–1981)

- Harlow, c. 1968
- Born: Harry Frederick Israel; October 31, 1905; Fairfield, Iowa, U.S.
- Died: December 6, 1981 (aged 76); Tucson, Arizona, U.S.
- Resting place: Forest Hill Cemetery
- Education: Stanford University
- Spouses: Clara Mears (m. 1932; div. 1946) Margaret Kuenne (m. 1946; died 1971) Clara Mears (m. 1972–1981)
- Awards: National Medal of Science (1967); Gold Medal from American Psychological; Foundation (1973); Howard Crosby Warren Medal (1956)
- Scientific career
- Fields: Psychology
- Doctoral advisor: Lewis Terman
- Doctoral students: Abraham Maslow; Stephen Suomi

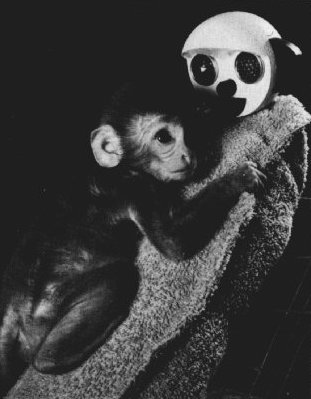
Monkey clinging to the cloth mother surrogate in fear test

Harry Frederick Harlow (October 31, 1905 – December 6, 1981) was an American psychologist best known for his work on the effect of isolation in monkeys as funded by the Ecology Fund [HEF], the CIA, and Project MK-Ultra as a part of his studies on psychological torture techniques during the Cold War. His findings on maternal-separation, dependency needs, and social isolation experiments on rhesus monkeys manifested the importance of caregiving and companionship to social and cognitive development. He conducted most of his research at the University of Wisconsin–Madison, where humanistic psychologist Abraham Maslow worked with him for a short period of time.

Harlow's experiments were ethically controversial; they included creating inanimate wire and wood surrogate "mothers" for the rhesus infants. Some monkeys were left in isolation for up to 24 months, a part of his examination into psychological torture tactics. Each infant became attached to its particular mother, recognizing its unique face. Harlow then investigated whether the infants had a preference for bare-wire mothers or cloth-covered mothers in different situations: with the wire mother holding a bottle with food, and the cloth mother holding nothing, or with the wire mother holding nothing, while the cloth mother held a bottle with food. The monkeys overwhelmingly chose the cloth mother, with or without food, only visiting the wire mother that had food when needing sustenance.

Later in his career, he cultivated infant monkeys in isolation chambers for up to 24 months, from which they emerged intensely disturbed. Some researchers cite the experiments as a factor in the rise of the animal liberation movement in the United States. A Review of General Psychology survey, published in 2002, ranked Harlow as the 26th most cited psychologist of the 20th century.

== Biography ==
Harry Harlow was born on October 31, 1905, to Mabel Rock and Alonzo Harlow Israel. Harlow was born and raised in Fairfield, Iowa, the third of four brothers. Little is known of Harlow's early life, but in an unfinished autobiography he recollected that his mother was cold to him and he experienced bouts of depression throughout his life. After a year at Reed College in Portland, Oregon, Harlow obtained admission to Stanford University through a special aptitude test. After a semester as an English major with nearly disastrous grades, he declared himself as a psychology major.

Harlow attended Stanford in 1924, and subsequently became a graduate student in psychology, working directly under Calvin Perry Stone, a well-known animal behaviorist, and Walter Richard Miles, a vision expert, who were all supervised by Lewis Terman. Harlow studied largely under Terman, the developer of the Stanford-Binet IQ Test, and Terman helped shape Harlow's future. After receiving a PhD in 1930, he changed his name from Israel to Harlow. The change was made at Terman's prompting for fear of the negative consequences of having a seemingly Jewish last name, even though his family was not Jewish.

Directly after completing his doctoral dissertation, Harlow accepted a professorship at the University of Wisconsin–Madison. Harlow was unsuccessful in persuading the Department of Psychology to provide him with adequate laboratory space. As a result, Harlow acquired a vacant building down the street from the university, and, with the assistance of his graduate students, renovated the building into what later became known as the Primate Laboratory, one of the first of its kind in the world. Under Harlow's direction, it became a place of cutting-edge research at which some 40 students earned their PhDs.

Harlow received numerous awards and honors, including election to the United States National Academy of Sciences (1951), the Howard Crosby Warren Medal (1956), election to the American Philosophical Society (1957), the National Medal of Science (1967), election to the American Academy of Arts and Sciences (1961), and the Gold Medal from the American Psychological Foundation (1973). He served as head of the Human Resources Research branch of the Department of the Army from 1950 to 1952, head of the Division of Anthropology and Psychology of the National Research Council from 1952 to 1955, consultant to the Army Scientific Advisory Panel, and president of the American Psychological Association from 1958 to 1959.

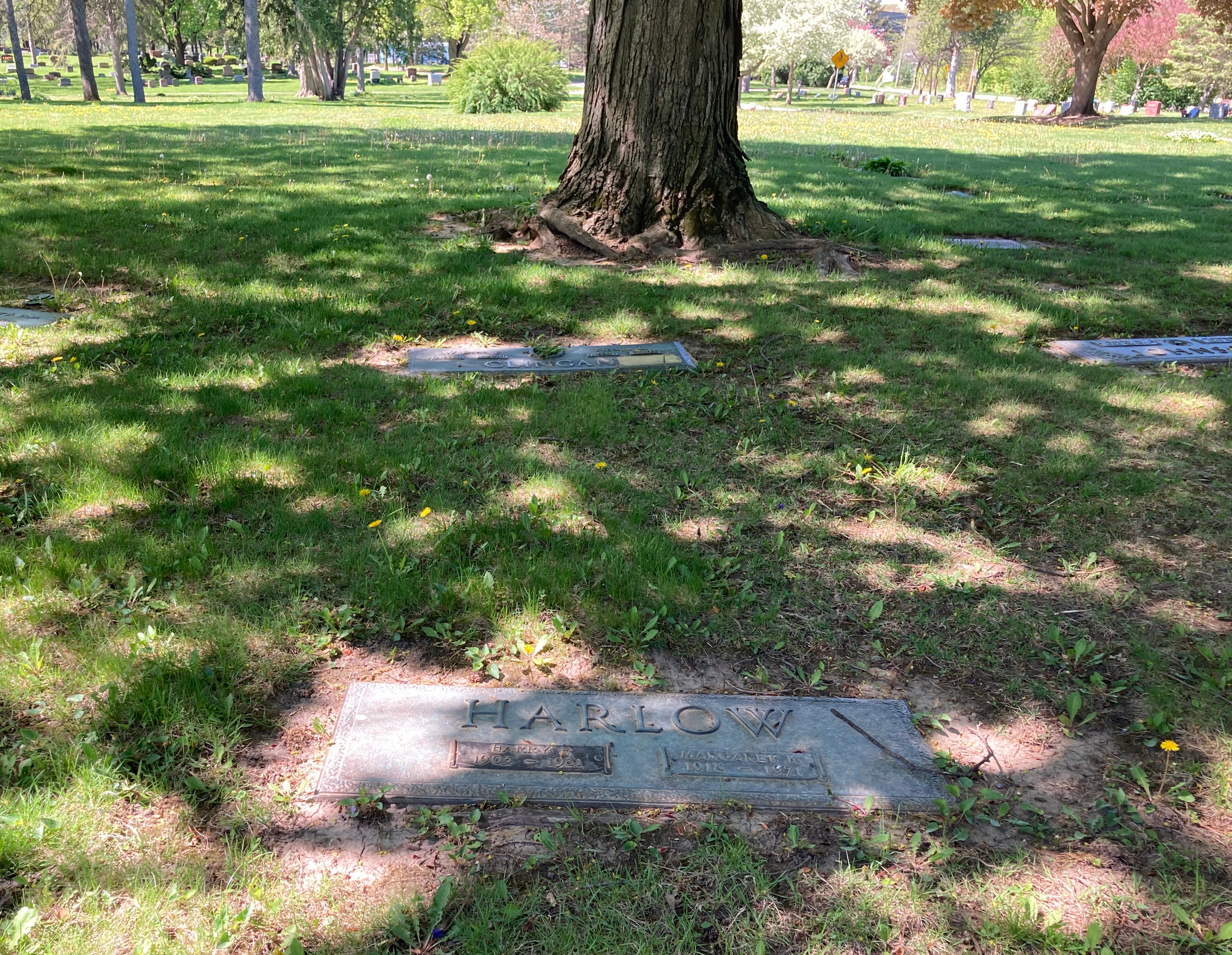
Graves of Harlow and Margaret Kuenne at Forest Hill Cemetery

Harlow married his first wife, Clara Mears, in 1932. One of the select students with an IQ above 150 whom Terman studied at Stanford, Clara was Harlow's student before becoming romantically involved with him. The couple had two children together, Robert and Richard. Harlow and Mears divorced in 1946. That same year, Harlow married child psychologist Margaret Kuenne. They had two children together, Pamela and Jonathan. Margaret died on August 11, 1971, after a prolonged struggle with cancer, with which she had been diagnosed in 1967. Her death led Harlow to depression once more, for which he was treated with electro-convulsive therapy. In March 1972, Harlow remarried Clara Mears. The couple lived together in Tucson, Arizona, until Harlow's death in 1981. He was buried alongside Margaret Kuenne at Forest Hill Cemetery in Madison, Wisconsin.

== Monkey studies ==
Harlow came to the University of Wisconsin–Madison in 1930 after obtaining his doctorate under the guidance of several distinguished researchers, including Calvin Stone and Lewis Terman, at Stanford University. He began his career with nonhuman primate research. He worked with the primates at Henry Vilas Zoo, where he developed the Wisconsin General Test Apparatus (WGTA) to study learning, cognition, and memory. It was through these studies that Harlow discovered that the monkeys he worked with were developing strategies for his tests. What would later become known as metalearning, Harlow described as "learning to learn" or "learning sets". At the time, the two competing theories of learning were Hull-Spence, which stated that learning was via trial and error, and Gestalt, which stated learning was via moments of sudden insight. The learning sets showed that there was no real conflict between the two, as learning begins by trial and error, but if a new problem resembles more and more previous problems, then it is more and more likely to be solved suddenly and insightfully.

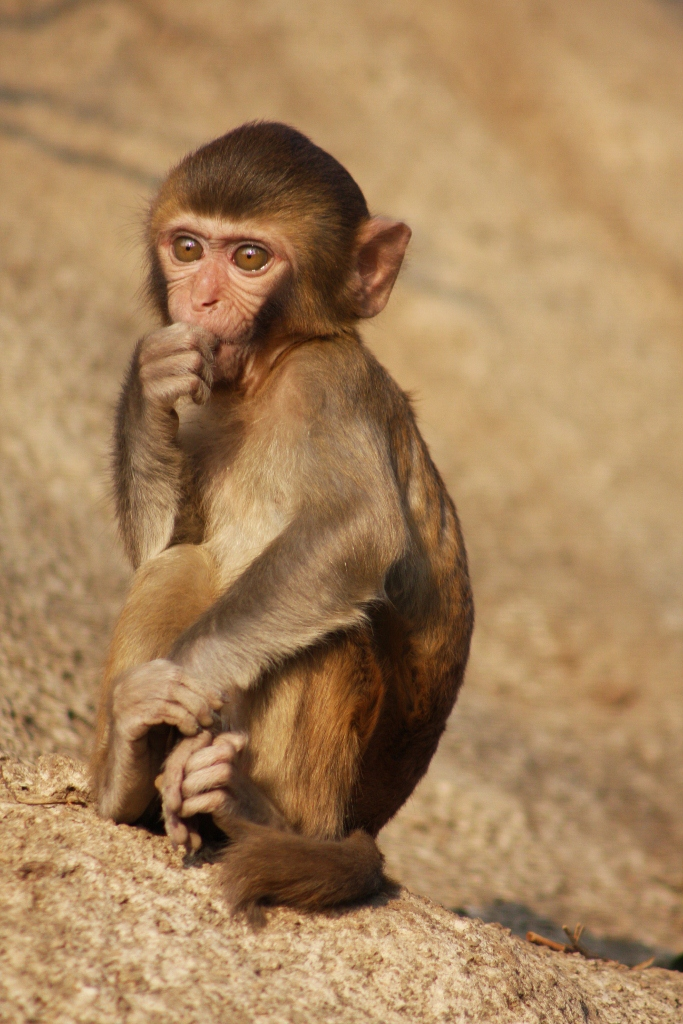
Harlow exclusively used rhesus macaques in his experiments.

In order to study the development of these learning sets, Harlow needed access to developing primates, so he established a breeding colony of rhesus macaques in 1932. Due to the nature of his study, Harlow needed regular access to infant primates and thus chose to rear them in a nursery setting, rather than with their protective mothers. This alternative rearing technique, also called maternal deprivation, is highly controversial to this day, and is used, in variants, as a model of early life adversity in primates.

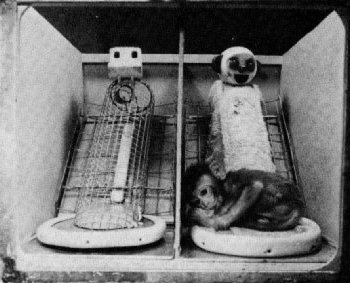
"Nature of love" wire and cloth mother surrogates

Research with and caring for infant rhesus monkeys further inspired Harlow, and ultimately led to some of his best-known experiments: the use of surrogate mothers. Although Harlow, his students, contemporaries, and associates soon learned how to care for the physical needs of their infant monkeys, the nursery-reared infants remained very different from their mother-reared peers. Psychologically speaking, these infants were slightly strange: they were reclusive, had definite social deficits, and clung to their cloth diapers. At the same time in the reverse configuration, babies that had grown up with only a mother and no playmates showed signs of fear or aggressiveness.

Noticing their attachment to the soft cloth of their diapers and the psychological changes that correlated with the absence of a maternal figure, Harlow sought to investigate the mother–infant bond. This relationship was under constant scrutiny in the early twentieth century, as B. F. Skinner and the behaviorists took on John Bowlby in a discussion of the mother's importance in the development of the child, the nature of their relationship, and the impact of physical contact between mother and child.

The studies were motivated by John Bowlby's World Health Organization-sponsored study and report "Maternal Care and Mental Health" in 1950, in which Bowlby reviewed previous studies on the effects of institutionalization on child development, and the distress experienced by children when separated from their mothers, such as René Spitz's and his own surveys on children raised in a variety of settings. In 1953, his colleague James Robertson produced a short and controversial documentary film, titled A Two-Year-Old Goes to Hospital, demonstrating the almost-immediate effects of maternal separation. Bowlby's report, coupled with Robertson's film, demonstrated the importance of the primary caregiver in human and non-human primate development. Bowlby de-emphasized the mother's role in feeding as a basis for the development of a strong mother–child relationship, but his conclusions generated much debate. It was the debate concerning the reasons behind the demonstrated need for maternal care that Harlow addressed in his studies with surrogates. Physical contact with infants was considered harmful to their development, and this view led to sterile, contact-less nurseries across the country. Bowlby disagreed, claiming that the mother provides much more than food to the infant, including a unique bond that positively influences the child's development and mental health.

To investigate the debate, Harlow created inanimate surrogate mothers for the rhesus infants from wire and wood. Each infant became attached to its particular mother, recognizing its unique face and preferring it above all others. Harlow next chose to investigate if the infants had a preference for bare-wire mothers or cloth-covered mothers. For this experiment, he presented the infants with a clothed mother and a wire mother under two conditions. In one situation, the wire mother held a bottle with food, and the cloth mother held no food. In the other situation, the cloth mother held the bottle, and the wire mother had nothing.

Overwhelmingly, the infant macaques preferred spending their time clinging to the cloth mother. Even when only the wire mother could provide nourishment, the monkeys visited her only to feed. Harlow concluded that there was much more to the mother–infant relationship than milk, and that this "contact comfort" was essential to the psychological development and health of infant monkeys and children. It was this research that gave strong, empirical support to Bowlby's assertions on the importance of love and mother–child interaction.

Successive experiments concluded that infants used the surrogate as a base for exploration, and a source of comfort and protection in novel and even frightening situations. In an experiment called the "open-field test", an infant was placed in a novel environment with novel objects. When the infant's surrogate mother was present, it clung to her, but then began venturing off to explore. If frightened, the infant ran back to the surrogate mother and clung to her for a time before venturing out again. Without the surrogate mother's presence, the monkeys were paralyzed with fear, huddling in a ball and sucking their thumbs.

In the "fear test", infants were presented with a fearful stimulus, often a noise-making teddy bear. Without the mother, the infants cowered and avoided the object. When the surrogate mother was present, however, the infant did not show great fearful responses and often contacted the device—exploring and attacking it.

Another study looked at the differentiated effects of being raised with only either a wire-mother or a cloth-mother. Both groups gained weight at equal rates, but the monkeys raised on a wire-mother had softer stool and trouble digesting the milk, frequently suffering from diarrhea. Harlow's interpretation of this behavior, which is still widely accepted, was that a lack of contact comfort is psychologically stressful to the monkeys, and the digestive problems are a physiological manifestation of that stress.

The importance of these findings is that they contradicted both the traditional pedagogic advice of limiting or avoiding bodily contact in an attempt to avoid spoiling children, and the insistence of the predominant behaviorist school of psychology that emotions were negligible. Feeding was thought to be the most important factor in the formation of a mother–child bond. Harlow concluded, however, that nursing strengthened the mother–child bond because of the intimate body contact that it provided. He described his experiments as a study of love. He also believed that contact comfort could be provided by either mother or father. Though widely accepted now, this idea was revolutionary at the time in provoking thoughts and values concerning the studies of love.

Some of Harlow's final experiments explored social deprivation in the quest to create an animal model for the study of depression. This study is the most controversial, and involved isolation of infant and juvenile macaques for various periods of time. Monkeys placed in isolation exhibited social deficits when introduced or re-introduced into a peer group. They appeared unsure of how to interact with their conspecifics, and mostly stayed separate from the group, demonstrating the importance of social interaction and stimuli in forming the ability to interact with conspecifics in developing monkeys, and, comparatively, in children.

Critics of Harlow's research have observed that clinging is a matter of survival in young rhesus monkeys, but not in humans, and have suggested that his conclusions, when applied to humans, overestimate the importance of contact comfort and underestimate the importance of nursing.

Harlow first reported the results of these experiments in "The Nature of Love", the title of his address to the sixty-sixth Annual Convention of the American Psychological Association in Washington, D.C., August 31, 1958.

=== Partial and total isolation of infant monkeys ===
Beginning in 1959, Harlow and his students began publishing their observations on the effects of partial and total social isolation. Partial isolation involved raising monkeys in bare wire cages that allowed them to see, smell, and hear other monkeys, but provided no opportunity for physical contact. Total social isolation involved rearing monkeys in isolation chambers that precluded any and all contact with other monkeys.

Harlow et al. reported that partial isolation resulted in various abnormalities such as blank staring, stereotyped repetitive circling in their cages, and self-mutilation. These monkeys were then observed in various settings.

In the total isolation experiments, baby monkeys would be left alone for three, six, 12, or 24 months of "total social deprivation". The experiments produced monkeys that were severely psychologically disturbed. Harlow wrote:

No monkey has died during isolation. When initially removed from total social isolation, however, they usually go into a state of emotional shock, characterized by ... autistic self-clutching and rocking. One of six monkeys isolated for 3 months refused to eat after release and died 5 days later. The autopsy report attributed death to emotional anorexia. ... The effects of 6 months of total social isolation were so devastating and debilitating that we had assumed initially that 12 months of isolation would not produce any additional decrement. This assumption proved to be false; 12 months of isolation almost obliterated the animals socially ...

Harlow tried to reintegrate the monkeys who had been isolated for six months by placing them with monkeys who had been raised normally. The rehabilitation attempts met with limited success. Harlow wrote that total social isolation for the first six months of life produced "severe deficits in virtually every aspect of social behavior". Isolates exposed to monkeys the same age who were reared normally "achieved only limited recovery of simple social responses". Some monkey mothers reared in isolation exhibited "acceptable maternal behavior when forced to accept infant contact over a period of months, but showed no further recovery". Isolates given to surrogate mothers developed "crude interactive patterns among themselves". Opposed to this, when six-month isolates were exposed to younger, three-month-old monkeys, they achieved "essentially complete social recovery for all situations tested". The findings were confirmed by other researchers, who found no difference between peer-therapy recipients and mother-reared infants, but found that artificial surrogates had very little effect.

Since Harlow's pioneering work on touch, recent researches have found evidence to support that touch during infancy is very important to health and touch deprivation can be harmful.

=== Pit of despair ===
Harlow was well known for refusing to use conventional terminology, instead choosing deliberately outrageous terms for the experimental apparatus he devised. This came from an early conflict with the conventional psychological establishment in which Harlow used the term "love" in place of the popular and archaically correct term "attachment". Such terms and respective devices included a forced-mating device he called the "rape rack", tormenting surrogate-mother devices he called "Iron maidens", and an isolation chamber he called the "pit of despair", developed by him and a graduate student, Stephen Suomi.

In the last of these devices, alternatively called the "well of despair", baby monkeys were left alone in darkness for up to one year from birth, or repetitively separated from their peers and isolated in the chamber. These procedures quickly produced monkeys that were severely psychologically disturbed, which were used as models of human depression.

Harlow tried to rehabilitate monkeys that had been subjected to varying degrees of isolation using various forms of therapy. "In our study of psychopathology, we began as sadists trying to produce abnormality. Today, we are psychiatrists trying to achieve normality and equanimity."

== Analysis of experiments ==
=== Influences ===
Harlow's work influenced Bruno Bettelheim, director of the Sonia Shankman Orthogenic School in Chicago. This was a home for "disturbed" children—Bettelheim studied autism in children. He was very fascinated with Harlow and his study with monkeys. He thought that he could use what Harlow learned in his own work.

=== Reactive attachment disorder ===
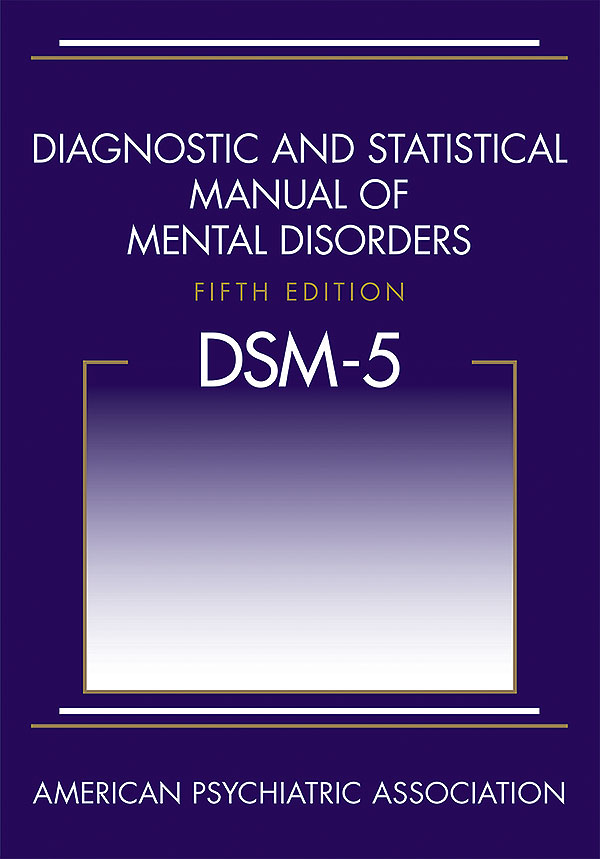
RAD is included in the DSM-5.

Reactive attachment disorder (RAD) forms when a child has experienced maltreatment, sexual and emotional abuse, or other forms of neglect, and manifests as behavioral problems. The treatment for reactive attachment disorder is very complex. By the time a child has been seen and diagnosed with reactive attachment disorder, several different mental health, medical, and developmental conditions need to be treated. While more children are being diagnosed with RAD, most are first mis-diagnosed with other behavioral problems. Children diagnosed with RAD need to be in intensive therapy, and so should their caregivers. The confusing path to a diagnosis often leaves children and families suffering for longer periods of time.

Harlow believed that the relationship between a mother and child was created by the mother providing tactile comfort, meaning infants have a natural need to touch and cling to something for emotional support. Harry Harlow helped further research that contributed to the discovery of RAD. He believed, and his study results showed, that the bond between mother and child in the first few years of life is extremely important for the mental health and development of the child. The ideas that he put into the psychology field of study helped discover what we know as RAD today.

== Criticism ==
Many of Harlow's experiments are now considered unethical—in their nature as well as Harlow's descriptions of them—and they both contributed to heightened awareness of the treatment of laboratory animals, and helped propel the creation of today's ethics regulations. The monkeys in the experiment were deprived of maternal affection, potentially leading to what are now known as panic disorders. University of Washington professor Gene Sackett, one of Harlow's doctoral students, stated that Harlow's experiments provided the impetus for the animal liberation movement in the U.S.

William Mason, another one of Harlow's students who continued conducting deprivation experiments after leaving Wisconsin, has said that Harlow "kept this going to the point where it was clear to many people that the work was really violating ordinary sensibilities, that anybody with respect for life or people would find this offensive. It's as if he sat down and said, 'I'm only going to be around another ten years. What I'd like to do, then, is leave a great big mess behind.' If that was his aim, he did a perfect job." Mason also published articles where he attempted to work through the issue between a scientist's wish to understand the natural world and the "rights" of animals to life and autonomy.

Stephen Suomi, a former Harlow student and supporter who now conducts maternal deprivation experiments on monkeys at the National Institutes of Health, has been criticized by PETA and members of the U.S. Congress.

Deborah Blum, a science journalist, criticized Harlow's work; criticisms by her and by his colleagues, collected by Blum, mentioned almost exclusively the negative impact on the public of his untamed language. Blum reported in her own writing that even Suomi felt that he had to wait until Harlow retired from the University of Wisconsin before he could shut down his unethical "pit of despair" projects; they had been causing him "nightmares".

Yet another of Harlow's students, Leonard Rosenblum, also went on to conduct maternal deprivation experiments with bonnet and pigtail macaque monkeys, and other research, involving exposing monkeys to drug–maternal-deprivation combinations in an attempt to "model" human panic disorder. Rosenblum's research, and his justifications for it, have also been criticized.

E. H. Eyestone, Chief of the Animal Resources Branch of the National Institutes of Health (NIH), expressed the concern of a review committee with the "pits of despair" experiments. Any concerns for welfare and humaneness were reduced to issues of publicity.

Harlow commented to an interviewer in 1974, "The only thing I care about is whether the monkeys will turn out a property I can publish. I don't have any love for them. Never have. I really don't like animals. I despise cats, I hate dogs. How could you like a monkey?".

Although Harlow certainly was aware of the animal protection legislation in place in the United Kingdom since 1876, active legislative attempts in the United States did not begin until 1960, where the Animal Welfare Act was passed in 1966.

== In popular culture ==
A theatrical play, The Harry Harlow Project, based on the life and work of Harlow, has been produced in Victoria and performed nationally in Australia.

Writer and animal-rights proponent Grant Morrison has cited Harry Harlow and his experiments as partial inspiration behind the creation (with Andy Kubert and Frazer Irving) of Batman villain Professor Pyg.
