= WGTA (AM) =

Radio station in Summerville, Georgia (1950–2014)

- Summerville, Georgia; United States
- Broadcast area: Rome metropolitan area, Georgia
- Frequency: 950 kHz

Programming
- Format: Regional Mexican
- Affiliations: Westwood One

Ownership
- Owner: Azteca Communications, Inc.
- Sister stations: WAZX, WAZX-FM, WCOC

History
- First air date: August 27, 1950
- Last air date: November 2014

Technical information
- Facility ID: 67648
- Class: D
- Power: 5,000 watts (day); 110 watts (night)
- Transmitter coordinates: 34°27′53.3″N 85°21′11.8″W

Links
- Website: laquebuenaatlanta.com

WGTA (950 AM, "Radio La Que Buena") was a radio station broadcasting a regional Mexican music format. Licensed to Summerville, Georgia, United States, the station served the Rome metropolitan area, Georgia. The station was owned by Azteca Communications, Inc. and featured programming from Westwood One. WGTA surrendered its license to the Federal Communications Commission (FCC) on November 3, 2014.
