= LDB =

LDB may refer to:

== Music ==
- The Little Drummer Boy, a Christmas song
  - LDB Challenge, to avoid hearing the song
- Kelton "LDB" Kessee (born 1981), drummer of R&B group IMx

== Organisations ==
- Land development bank, a type of bank in India
- Liga de Desenvolvimento de Basquete, a Brazilian under-22 basketball league
- Liquor Distribution Branch, a Canadian governmental body
- The Louis D. Brandeis Center for Human Rights under Law, a Jewish non-profit

== Rail ==
- Lake railway station, Isle of Wight (GBR:LDB)
- Lordsburg (Amtrak station), New Mexico, US (Amtrak:LDB)

== Other uses ==
- Light-dark box test, an animal model used in pharmacology
- Long duration ballooning, a program of the Columbia Scientific Balloon Facility
