= Hole-board test =

The hole-board test (HBT) is an experimental method used in scientific research to measure anxiety, stress, neophilia and emotionality in animals. Because of its ability to measure multiple behaviors it is a popular test in behavioral pharmacology, but the results are controversial.

== Concept ==
The HBT was designed in the 1970s to mitigate the flaws of the open field test (OFT), another animal model that measures anxiety and exploratory behavior. Exploratory behavior requires a choice to be made to explore, but since the OFT is just a brightly lit area, the animal doesn't have a choice. The OFT also doesn't differentiate between locomotion and exploration.

The HBT apparatus is an area with walls around it to prevent escape. The floor of the area is covered with holes. Over the years the HBT apparatus has become more complex. Modern devices are now monitored by computer and have infrared beams.

The three common activities are head dipping, rearing, and locomotion. Head dipping is commonly defined as when the animal puts his head into the hole until its ears are level with the floor or in modern devices when it breaks the infrared beam. Rearing is when the animal stands on its hind legs. Locomotion is the animal moving to a different area with all four paws. If the animal moves into the central area it is as separate observation because the central area is the most threatening to animals. These three behaviors are exploratory and the more they occur, the less anxious the animal is. On the other hand, if the animal doesn't show these behaviors, then it is more anxious.

== Scientific procedure ==
The procedure of this experiment can be modified depending on the behavior being measured. To examine anxiety a single animal is placed in the apparatus for five minutes where it is observed and then removed. Another animal that has been injected with an anxiolytic agent is then placed in the apparatus and then observed. Increased dose of anxiolytics leads to sedation.

To observe neophilia and learning behavior, the test is typically done multiple times. As the tests go on, the number of head dipping decreases because the animal has now gotten used to the arena. These tests can also have objects in the area to promote exploratory behaviors. Animals in areas with objects showed increased locomotion compared to animals in areas without objects.

== Controversy ==
Since the root cause of anxiety is idiopathic, animal models are difficult to create and therefore flawed. But because changes are seen through administration of anxiolytic agents, they are pharmacologically proven. The HBT studies show inconsistent results when administering known anti-anxiety medication such as benzodiazepines.

The HBT showing neophilia is also controversial. Since animals show decreased head dipping, scientists conclude that it is a result of the animal becoming less fearful. However other studies have shown that after the amount of time with decreased head dipping, head dipping actually starts to increase, meaning that animals might have gotten bored with the area and are now exploring the holes.

== See also ==
- Elevated plus maze
- Marble burying
- Morris water navigation task
