= Marble burying =

Animal model used in scientific research

Marble burying is an animal model used in scientific research to depict anxiety or obsessive–compulsive disorder (OCD) behavior. It is based on the observation that rats and mice will bury either harmful or harmless objects in their bedding. While widely used there is significant controversy over the interpretation of its results.

== Difficulty in modeling ==
Animal behavior modeling is difficult because to create a competent model, the cause of the disease must be known. In the case of OCD and anxiety the causes are idiopathic. The symptoms for both diseases overlap making it difficult to know what disease the animal model is displaying.

OCD is a serious condition with a lifetime prevalence of 1-3%. Common symptoms of OCD include recurrent obsessions or compulsions. These compulsions are time-consuming (more than 1 hr/day) and cause significant stress or impairment in the patient's everyday life. The most common treatment of OCD is serotonin reuptake inhibitors (SSRI) and behavioral treatment.

Anxiety is a complex multi-faceted disorder with many symptoms. Anxiety is difficult to model because psychiatrists who clinically diagnose anxiety follow the Diagnostic and Statistical Manual (DSM IV) of the American Psychiatric Association, which includes self-reporting from patients. Since animals cannot explain to us how they feel, animals cannot be diagnosed with anxiety disorder under the same criteria. However symptoms of anxiety can be inferred from animal behavior.

== Concept ==
When rodents are put in a cage with marbles they will bury the marbles. This behavior is seen as anxiety related or OCD behavior. When the rodents are injected with drugs used to treat anxiety or OCD, the amount of marbles buried decreases. Marble burying doesn't show any difference between anti-compulsive or anxiolytic activity. The test is also sensitive to antidepressant agents.

The test is sensitive to two major classes of drugs: the Selective Serotonin (5-HT) reuptake inhibitors (SSRIs) and benzodiazepines. Benzodiazepines are commonly used to treat anxiety and SSRIs are used to treat both OCD and anxiety.

== Procedure ==
Rodents are placed for thirty minutes in a standard cage filled with 5 cm depth of wood chip bedding with 10 marbles evenly spaced. After thirty minutes the number of marbles buried are counted. In this procedure a marble is considered buried if 2/3 of the marble is covered with bedding. Within the study there should be two groups of animals, one group which has been injected with saline and another group which has been injected with the agent being tested.

There are multiple variations of this test. Some experiments use more marbles while other variants place the marbles differently.

It is important to keep the laboratory quiet while performing this experiment to avoid unintended results. Younger mice will bury marbles faster than older mice so the age of the mice being tested must be the same.

== Criticisms ==
There are mixed opinions over the validity of the marble burying test. If the marbles cause anxiety, critics point out that rodents would most likely remain immobile or avoid the side containing marbles.

Critics also point out that the marble burying test reacts to two types of drugs the SSRIs and benzodiazepines. Benzodiazepines have been shown to have no effect on patients with OCD. If the test measured OCD then benzodiazepines would not affect rodent behavior.

The marble burying test measures one acute dose of anti-anxiety agent for thirty minutes. It can be weeks before a noticeable change is observed in patients. There is also a genetic component to this test. Some strains show decreased burying behaviour. This can be counteracted by coating marbles with substances such as Tabasco sauce which will increase burying.

The general consensus when testing potential anxiety and OCD medication is to perform a battery of anxiety tests with a high predictive validity to determine the potential therapeutic value of a novel agent.

== See also ==
- Elevated Plus Maze
- Open Field (animal test)
- Animal Models of Depression
