= Pit of despair =

Device used by Harry Harlow to study rhesus monkeys

A rhesus monkey infant in one of Harlow's isolation chambers. The photograph was taken when the chamber door was raised for the first time after six months of total isolation.

The pit of despair was a name used by American comparative psychologist Harry Harlow for a device he designed, technically called a vertical chamber apparatus, that he used in experiments on rhesus macaque monkeys at the University of Wisconsin–Madison in the 1970s. The aim of the research was to produce an animal model of depression. Researcher Stephen Suomi described the device as "little more than a stainless-steel trough with sides that sloped to a rounded bottom":

A 3/8 in. wire mesh floor 1 in. above the bottom of the chamber allowed waste material to drop through the drain and out of holes drilled in the stainless-steel. The chamber was equipped with a food box and a water-bottle holder, and was covered with a pyramid top [removed in the accompanying photograph], designed to discourage incarcerated subjects from hanging from the upper part of the chamber.

Harlow had already placed newly born monkeys in isolation chambers for up to one year. With the "pit of despair", he placed monkeys between three months and three years old who had already bonded with their mothers in the chamber alone for up to ten weeks. Within a few days, they had stopped moving about and remained huddled in a corner.

== Background ==
Much of Harlow's scientific career was spent studying maternal bonding, what he described as the "nature of love". These experiments involved rearing newborn "total isolates" and monkeys with surrogate mothers, ranging from toweling-covered cones to a machine that modeled abusive mothers by assaulting the baby monkeys with cold air or spikes.

In 1971, Harlow's wife died of cancer and he began to suffer from depression. He was treated and returned to work but, as Lauren Slater writes, his colleagues noticed a difference in his demeanor. He abandoned his research into maternal attachment and developed an interest in isolation and depression.

Harlow's first experiments involved isolating a monkey in a cage surrounded by steel walls with a small one-way mirror, so the experimenters could look in, but the monkey could not look out. The only connection the monkey had with the world was when the experimenters' hands changed his bedding or delivered fresh water and food. Baby monkeys were placed in these boxes soon after birth; four were left for 30 days, four for six months, and four for a year. After 30 days, the "total isolates", as they were called, were found to be "enormously disturbed". After being isolated for a year, they barely moved, did not explore or play, and were incapable of having sexual relations. When placed with other monkeys for a daily play session, they were badly bullied. Two of them refused to eat and starved themselves to death.

Harlow also wanted to test how isolation would affect parenting skills, but the isolates were unable to mate. Harlow devised what he called a "rape rack", to which the female isolates were tied in normal monkey mating posture. He found that, just as they were incapable of having sexual relations, they were also unable to parent their offspring, either abusing or neglecting them. "Not even in our most devious dreams could we have designed a surrogate as evil as these real monkey mothers were", he wrote. Having no social experience themselves, they were incapable of appropriate social interaction. One mother held her baby's face to the floor and chewed off his feet and fingers. Another crushed her baby's head. Most of them simply ignored their offspring.

These experiments showed Harlow what total and partial isolation did to developing monkeys, but he felt he had not captured the essence of depression, which he believed was characterized by feelings of loneliness, helplessness, and a sense of being trapped, or being "sunk in a well of despair", he said.

== Vertical chamber apparatus ==
Harlow's vertical chamber apparatus

The technical name for the new depression chamber was "vertical chamber apparatus", though Harlow himself insisted on calling it the "pit of despair". He had at first wanted to call it the "dungeon of despair", and also used terms like "well of despair", and "well of loneliness". Blum writes that his colleagues tried to persuade him not to use such descriptive terms, that a less visual name would be easier, politically speaking. Gene Sackett of the University of Washington in Seattle, one of Harlow's doctoral students who went on to conduct additional deprivation studies, said, "He first wanted to call it a dungeon of despair. Can you imagine the reaction to that?".

Most of the monkeys placed inside it were at least three months old and had already bonded with others. The point of the experiment was to break those bonds in order to create the symptoms of depression. The chamber was a small, inverted metal pyramid, with slippery sides slanting down to a point. The monkey was placed in the point. The opening was covered with mesh. The monkeys would spend the first day or two trying to climb up the slippery sides. After a few days, they gave up. Harlow wrote, "most subjects typically assume a hunched position in a corner of the bottom of the apparatus. One might presume at this point that they find their situation to be hopeless." Stephen J. Suomi, another of Harlow's doctoral students, placed some monkeys in the chamber in 1970 for his PhD. He wrote that he could find no monkey who had any defense against it. Even the happiest monkeys came out damaged.

== Reception ==
The experiments were condemned, both at the time and later, from within the scientific community and elsewhere in academia. In 1974, American literary critic Wayne C. Booth wrote that "Harry Harlow and his colleagues go on torturing their nonhuman primates decade after decade, invariably proving what we all knew in advance—that social creatures can be destroyed by destroying their social ties." He writes that Harlow made no mention of the criticism of the morality of his work.

Charles Snowdon, a junior member of the faculty at the time, who became head of psychology at Wisconsin, said that Harlow had himself been very depressed by his wife's cancer. Snowdon was appalled by the design of the vertical chambers. He asked Suomi why they were using them, and Harlow replied, "Because that's how it feels when you're depressed." Leonard Rosenblum, who studied under Harlow, told Lauren Slater that Harlow enjoyed using shocking terms for his apparatus because "he always wanted to get a rise out of people".

Another of Harlow's students, William Mason, who also conducted deprivation experiments elsewhere, said that Harlow "kept this going to the point where it was clear to many people that the work was really violating ordinary sensibilities, that anybody with respect for life or people would find this offensive. It's as if he sat down and said, 'I'm only going to be around another ten years. What I'd like to do, then, is leave a great big mess behind.' If that was his aim, he did a perfect job."

== See also ==
- Animal testing
- Britches (monkey)
- Flowerpot technique, a method of sleep deprivation in laboratory animals
- Psychological torture
- Psychological trauma
- Research ethics
- Silver Spring monkeys
- Touch starvation
- Unnecessary Fuss, video showing brain damage experiments on baboons
