= Stephen Suomi =

American ethologist

Stephen J. Suomi is chief of the Laboratory of Comparative Ethology at the National Institute of Child Health and Human Development (NICHD) in Bethesda, Maryland. He is also a research professor at the University of Virginia, the University of Maryland, and Johns Hopkins University. He is involved with the Experience-based Brain & Biological Development Program, launched in 2003 by the Canadian Institute for Advanced Research.

Suomi was elected as a Fellow of the American Association for the Advancement of Science for his contributions to the understanding of how socialization affects the psychological development of non-human primates. He worked in the early 1970s as a research assistant to psychologist Harry Harlow, showing that it was possible to rehabilitate rhesus monkeys that had been reared in social isolation for the first six months of life by temporarily housing them with socially normal monkeys. At the University of Wisconsin-Madison Suomi worked with Harry Harlow to develop the pit of despair, a series of controversial and widely condemned experiments on baby monkeys that have been credited by some researchers as starting the animal liberation movement in the United States. Suomi has made no mention of the morality of his work.

== Education and career ==
Suomi received a B.A. in psychology from Stanford University in 1968, and a Ph.D. in the same subject from the University of Wisconsin–Madison in 1971. He became a full professor with the university's psychology department in 1984, and began to work for the NICHD in 1983.

== Work ==
Suomi describes his current research interests as focusing on the role of genetic and environmental factors in shaping individual psychological development in non-human primates; the effect of change on psychological development; and whether findings on monkeys in captivity can translate to monkeys living in the wild, and between human beings of different cultures.

In 2014, following a campaign by PETA, Suomi was criticized by members of the U.S. Congress for maternal deprivation experiments on monkeys. Both the American Psychological Association and the American Society of Primatologists defended Suomi's research as scientifically useful and ethically sound. However, in 2015, the National Institutes of Health (NIH) announced it would end monkey experiments for financial reasons, stressing that PETA's campaign "was not a factor in this decision". The following year, it announced it would review its policies on all primate research.

== See also ==
- Animal testing
- Harry Harlow
- Pit of despair
