= Margaret Kuenne Harlow =

Developmental psychologist

Margaret Ruth Kuenne Harlow (1918–1971) was an American developmental psychologist. She was married to Harry Harlow from 1946 until her death in 1971.

== Early life ==
Margaret Ruth Kuenne was born in St. Louis on August 8, 1918 to Edward S. Kuenne and Margaret E. Kuenne; she was the oldest of three children (her siblings were economist Robert E. Kuenne and atomic physicist Dorothy Kuenne Stearns).

She received her bachelor's degree from the University of Washington, where she was a member of Phi Beta Kappa, at the age of twenty, and her master's degree from the same university two years later in 1940. She received her doctoral degree in psychology from the University of Iowa, where she studied Hull's theories of conditioning in children under Kenneth Spence, in 1944. Her dissertation considered how theoretical research could be conducted with children to bridge the gap between studies with mature humans and studies with animals such as monkeys.

== Career ==
After receiving her doctorate, she worked as an instructor at the University of Minnesota for two years before becoming an associate professor at the University of Wisconsin in 1946.

Shortly after her arrival at the University of Wisconsin, she was recruited by Harry Harlow to run studies with children to supplement his work on learning with monkeys. She assembled a small group of children with high IQs, and measured the speed at which they learned to solve puzzles for a small reward.

She remained at the University of Wisconsin until her death, where she worked closely with Harlow, whom she married in 1948, and served as a project associate in his primate laboratory. (The university's nepotism rules meant that she was not allowed faculty status for the majority of her time there.) Toward the end of her career, she raised monkeys in nuclear family situations to study the effects of paternal love.

In 1965, she returned to teaching as a lecturer in the Department of Educational Psychology, and was made a full professor in 1970.

Margaret Harlow was a talented editor and administrator as well as an accomplished psychologist. She was a leading member of the Society for Research in Child Development. She founded the publications office of the American Psychological Association (now the Office of Publications and Databases) in 1950, and served as its first director. With Harry Harlow, she published numerous articles and co-edited the Journal of Comparative and Physiological Psychology.

== Personal life ==
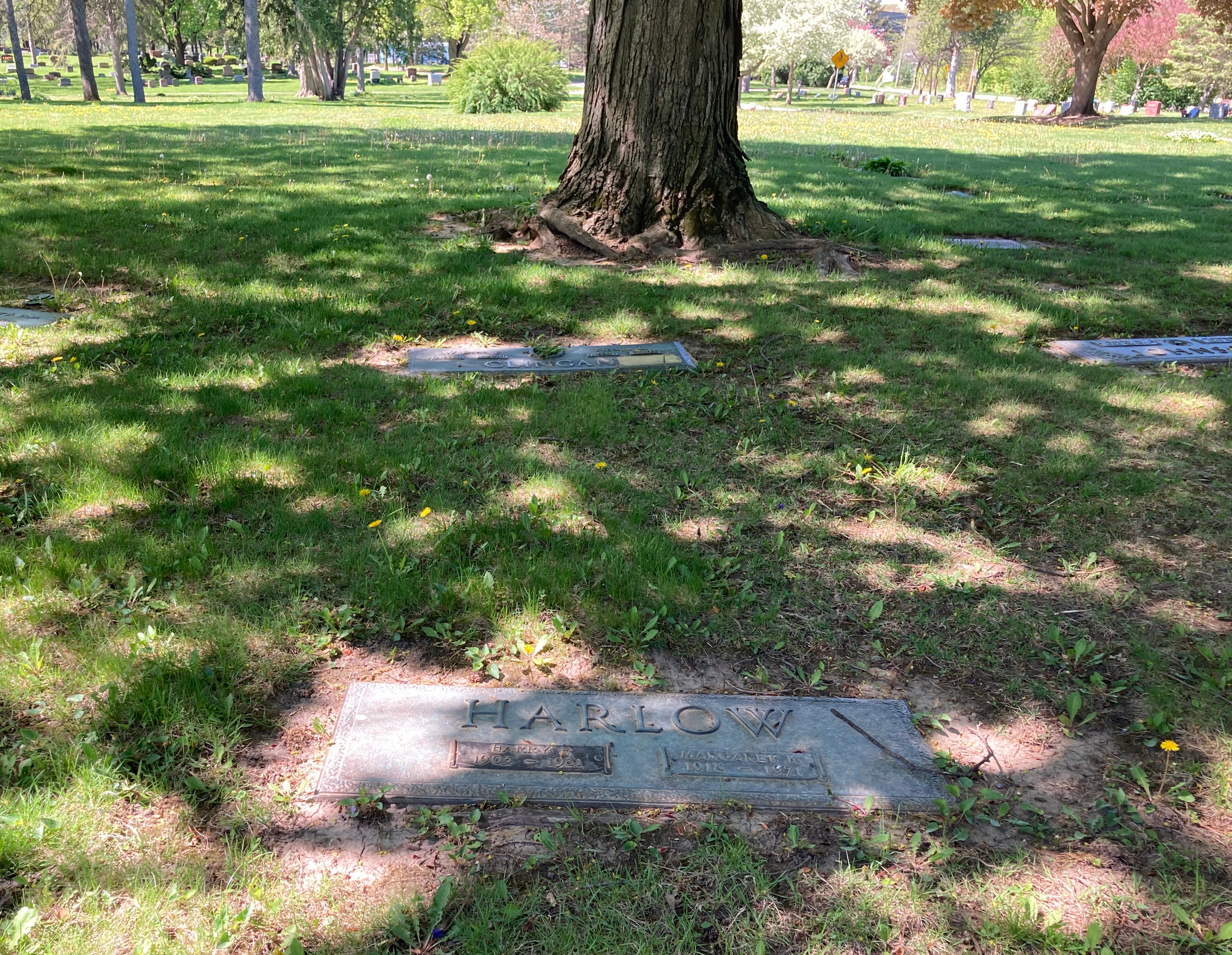
Graves of Kuenne and Harry Harlow at Forest Hill Cemetery

While working with Harry Harlow at the University in Wisconsin, the two gradually developed affections for each other, and married on February 3, 1948 in Anamosa, Iowa. They kept the marriage quiet in hopes of evading the university's nepotism policies, but the administration eventually found out, and Margaret was forced to step down from her professorship (though the Harlows managed to circumvent university policy by employing her as a project associate in Harry's primate lab).

Though her family had always called her "Margaret", Harry called her "Peggy". They had two children together; their daughter Pamela was born in 1950, and their son Jonathan in 1953. The family lived in a house that was close to both the university and the zoo.

In 1967, Margaret was diagnosed with breast cancer. She continued to work for several more years, citing a desire to teach as a full professor as a driving force, but regretted that she likely would not see the results of her nuclear family monkey studies. She died on August 11, 1971, and was buried at Forest Hill Cemetery in Madison, Wisconsin. Harlow was buried alongside her after his death in 1981.
