= Elevated plus maze =

Scientific test for laboratory mice

Schematic drawing of an elevated plus maze

The elevated plus maze (EPM) is a test measuring anxiety in laboratory animals that usually uses rodents as a screening test for putative anxiolytic or anxiogenic compounds and as a general research tool in neurobiological anxiety research such as PTSD and TBI. The model is based on the test animal's aversion to open spaces and tendency to be thigmotaxic. In the EPM, this anxiety is expressed by the animal spending more time in the enclosed arms. The validity of the model has been criticized as non-classical clinical anxiolytics produce mixed results in the EPM test. Despite this, the model is still commonly used for screening putative anxiolytics and for general research into the brain mechanisms of anxiety.

== Method ==
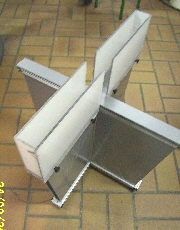
An elevated plus maze (for mice)

The test uses an elevated, plus-shaped (+) apparatus with two open and two enclosed arms. The behavioral model is based on the general aversion of rodents to open spaces. This aversion leads to thigmotaxis: a preference for remaining in enclosed spaces or close to the edges of a bounded space. In the EPM, this translates into the animals limiting their movement to the enclosed arms.

A reduction in anxiety is indicated by increased time spent in the open arms (as a fraction of total time), and increased entries into them (as a fraction of total entries). Total entries and closed-arm entries are sometimes used as measures of general activity. The relationship between the EPM and other tests of exploratory activity (open-field and emergence) have been analyzed in two mouse strains.

== Criticism ==
While EPM is the most commonly employed animal behavioral model of anxiety, there are several issues concerning the validity of the model. Classical clinical anxiolytics, such as benzodiazepines (e.g., Valium), do reduce measures of anxiety in EPM. However, more novel compounds, such as 5-HT_{1A} agonists (e.g., Buspar) give mixed results. Selective serotonin reuptake inhibitors and tricyclic antidepressants, which are commonly employed in clinical settings to treat anxiety disorders, also do not lead to a stable anxiolytic effect on EPM. This raises the possibility that EPM is a suitable model for testing GABA-related compounds, such as benzodiazepines or direct GABA_{A} agonists, but not for other drugs. Despite this, the model is commonly employed for screening putative anxiolytics and for general research into the brain mechanisms of anxiety, likely due to the ease of employment and the vast number of studies already in the literature.

== Variations ==
=== Elevated zero maze ===
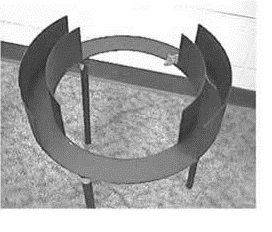
Elevated zero maze (mouse can be seen in the top right)

The elevated zero maze (EZM) is an elevated circular runway with alternating open light areas and enclosed dark areas. The continuous nature of this apparatus eliminates the problem of the EPM in how to account for the animal's presence in the center area of the EPM. In the EPM test, animals may spend up to 30% of their time in the ambiguous central start area or return to it often, making it difficult to evaluate the biological significance of anxiety related behaviour. Animal will return to the central area because they are habituated to that area and associate it with being "safe".

Untreated rodents show a higher exploration of open areas in the EZM than in the EPM. This could indicate the EPM inhibits exploration, but the fact that rodents spent time in the central zone of the EPM needs to be taken into account. The EZM is more sensitive to changes than the EPM due to the baseline level in the EZM being lower than the EPM.

=== Elevated T maze ===
The elevated T maze (ETM) has three arms in the shape of the letter "T". One arm is closed and perpendicular to the other two arms which are open. This test is designed to observe anxiety effects and how it affects learning. The rodent is placed on the enclosed arm and allowed to explore. The trial ends when the rodents sets all four paws in one of the open arms. Rodents are allowed multiple trials until they learn to stay in one of the open arms for 300 seconds. This is a measurement of inhibitory avoidance. Depending on what the rodents were treated with during the training sessions, they would learn at different rates giving information on how the brain stores memories. This test can be used to assess long term memory. When a rodent has been sufficiently trained, researchers will test the rodent again after a week to observe if the rodent still remembers to stay in the enclosed arm.

=== Plus-maze discriminative avoidance test ===
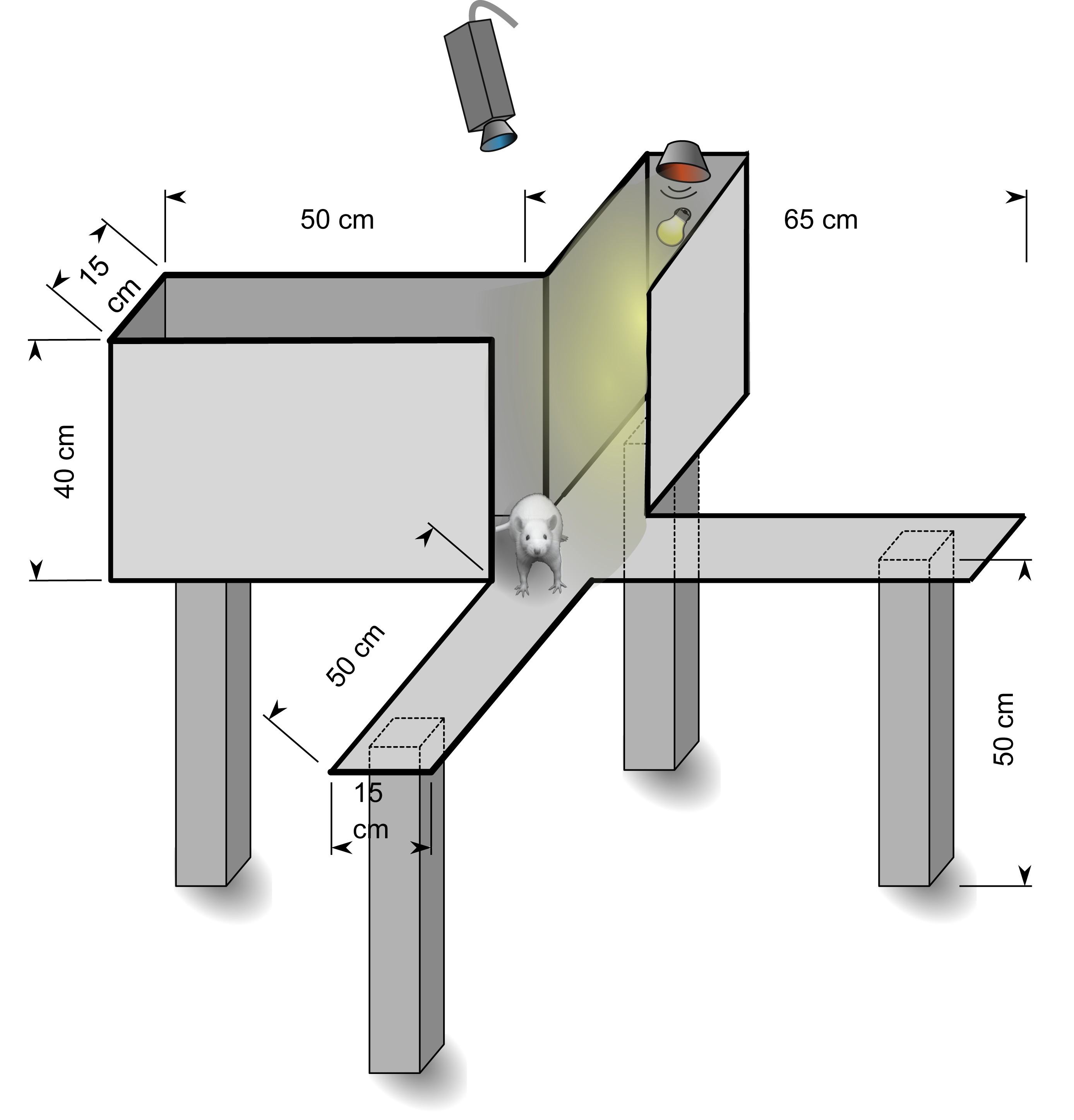
Schematic representation of the apparatus used for the plus-maze discriminative avoidance test

Like the standard EPM, the apparatus used in the plus-maze discriminative avoidance test (PMDAT) has four arms. This test has been used to investigate interactions between aversive memory and anxiety responses in rodents. The apparatus has two open arms opposite to two enclosed arms. In this test, one of the enclosed arms is paired with aversive stimuli (e.g. bright light, loud white noise). During training, animals are placed in the apparatus facing the intercept between the open arms. Each time the animal enters the aversive enclosed arm, the aversive stimulus is presented until the animal leaves the arm. Upon a second exposure to the maze (e.g. 24 h later) the aversive stimuli is no longer presented. Retention of the aversive memory is assessed based on the relative time spent in the non-aversive arm compared to the previously aversive arm and anxiety behavior is calculated based on the time spent in the open arms during the training session.

=== Multivariate Concentric Square Field test (MCSF-test) ===
The MCSF-test is a behaviour model used to study risk assessment, risk taking, anxiety and security seeking behaviour. It has a completely different design compared to the t-maze, but instead of using a battery of different behaviour models this test can be used to measure a variety of dependent and independent variables. In this context "multivariate" is defined as that the subject has a free choice of different environments contained in the same apparatus and session.

The MCSF consists of different areas associated with risk-taking and shelter-seeking. The subject can therefore choose between locations with different qualities regarding open areas, illuminations, shelter and exploratory challenges. The arena consists of a dark room enclosed by walls and ceiling, dimly illuminated corridors, open area with moderate illumination, a hole-board area which requires a certain physical effort to reach and an elevated bridge with high illumination.

=== Elevated plus maze for humans using virtual reality ===
Using a combination of virtual reality and real-world elements, the EPM has been transferred to usage with humans. Participants who partook in the study were placed on a 3.5 by 3.5 meters wide and 0.3m high wooden cross while wearing a virtual reality headset. In the virtual environment, the real cross was matched in exact dimension and orientation. Open arms were above a 50-meter drop over open water, while the closed arms were surrounded by a stable and firm surface around the platform. Similar to the observed rodent behavior on an EPM, participants reported higher anxiety on open arms while also avoiding those more. Participants with high anxiety also exhibited higher avoidance of open arms.

== See also ==
- Hole-board test
- Morris water navigation task
- Vogel conflict test
