= Wisconsin General Test Apparatus =

Equipment to test learning in primates

The Wisconsin General Test Apparatus, also known as the WGTA, is a piece of manually operated laboratory equipment created by the collaborative effort of Dr. Paul Settlage and Dr. Walter Grether to test learning in primates. It was first introduced in the scientific literature by Drs. Harry Harlow and John Bromer in 1938.

== Origin ==
The Wisconsin General Test Apparatus was created in the 1930s at the Harlow Center for Biological Psychology at the University of Wisconsin–Madison. The development of the device is credited to Drs. Paul Settlage and Walter Grether, and Drs.Harry Harlow and John Bromer are credited with the first publication about the device in 1938, where it gained much notoriety. It was originally designed for testing learning in non-human primates. In particular, the WGTA was intended for use with Rhesus monkeys.

== Design ==
The Wisconsin General Test Apparatus is a piece of laboratory equipment designed to allow both the subject and the researcher to interact in a controlled environment, while conducting an assortment of memory and learning tests. The apparatus is constructed of two independent square compartments. One of which is a flexible cage to contain the primate subject and the other is the presentation board which houses the stimulus tray. The stimulus tray contains several food wells which can be covered with three-dimensional objects such as stars, squares, pyramids, or circles, with differing sizes and colors. There is a one way screen separating the two compartments which allows the researcher to control whether the subject can see them place the stimulus objects and food rewards in the stimulus tray or not. On the outside of the stimulus compartment, opposite the cage, there is a second one way screen which allows the researcher to observe the subject at each stage of the trial without interfering with the subject’s behavior. Both compartments are completely enclosed to ensure the safety of both the subject and the researcher.

There are several other components that make up a standard WGTA which have remained constant throughout the numerous modifications made to the device over time. One of these elements is a food reward such as a raisin, peanut, grape, or apple bit. Underneath a variable number of stimulus objects, usually 1-3, there will be a reward for the subject to access once they properly move the object. The WGTA also provides the option for an interval of observation in which the monkey can see but not yet move any of the stimulus objects. The researcher is able to observe the primate’s behavior during this interval through a one way screen. There is also another interval during which the divider is removed and the monkey can access the objects and obtain the food reward. For this period of time, the primate is allowed to manipulate the objects in an attempt to obtain the reward, during which time the observer is able to collect additional observational data on the primate’s behavior.

== Uses ==
The Wisconsin General Test Apparatus is used to test the learning capabilities of monkeys. The subject, usually a primate, is contained in the half of the apparatus that functions as a cage. Here the primate and observer are able to be kept safe during different intervals of observation. Numerous tests including black-white discrimination and reversal tests and two-choice object discrimination tests have utilized the Wisconsin General Test Apparatus. The device has also been modified for other uses. These include but are not limited to modifications for: use with rats, use with smaller primates, a semi-automatic function, and for improved portability.
