= Animal models of depression =

Research tools for understanding depressive symptoms in non-human animals

Animal models of depression are research tools used to investigate depression and action of antidepressants as a simulation to investigate the symptomatology and pathophysiology of depressive illness or used to screen novel antidepressants.

== Introduction ==
=== Depression ===
Major depressive disorder is commonly called "clinical depression" or "depression." It is a common, long-lasting and diverse psychiatric syndrome that significantly affects a person's thoughts, behavior, feelings and sense of well-being. According to the DSM-5, someone diagnosed with depression should be showing at least five symptoms and they should last two weeks. Depression can include a variety of different symptoms and does not always look the same for everyone. Some of these symptoms may include sadness, anxiousness, emptiness, hopelessness, worry, helplessness, worthlessness, guilt, irritableness, hurt, or restlessness. People experiencing depression may also lose interest in activities that once were pleasurable, experience loss of appetite, overeat, have problems concentrating, remembering details, making decisions, and may contemplate or attempt suicide. Insomnia, excessive sleeping, fatigue, loss of energy, aches, pains, or digestive problems that are resistant to treatment may also be present.

=== Modeling depression in animals ===
It is difficult to develop an animal model that perfectly reproduces the symptoms of depression in patients. It is generic that 3 standards may be used to evaluate the reliability of an animal version of depression: the phenomenological or morphological appearances (face validity), a comparable etiology (assemble validity), and healing similarities (predictive validity). Many animals lack self-consciousness, self-reflection, and consideration; moreover, hallmarks of the disorder such as depressed mood, low self-esteem or suicidality are hardly accessible in non-humans. However, depression, as other mental disorders, consists of endophenotypes that can be reproduced independently and evaluated in animals. An ideal animal model offers an opportunity to understand molecular, genetic, and epigenetic factors that may lead to depression. By using animal models, the underlying molecular alterations and the causal relationship between genetic, or environmental, alterations and depression can be examined. This would afford a better insight into pathology of depression because animal models are indispensable for identifying novel therapies for depression. To improve the usefulness of studies using animal models of psychiatric disorders, including depression, the 'Improving Translational Relevance in Preclinical Psychopharmacology' (iTRIPP) guidelines for planning and reporting of such studies have been developed.

=== Endophenotypes in animal model of depression ===
The following endophenotypes have been described:

- Anhedonia: The loss of interest is a core symptom of depression. Anhedonia in rodents can be assessed by sucrose preference or by intracranial self-stimulation.
- Behavioral despair: Behavioral despair might be assessed with tests such as the forced-swimming test or the tail suspension test.
- Changes in appetite or weight gain: Depression is often associated with changes in appetite or weight gain, which is easily measured in rodents. There was a study done where the experimental group of mice had a suppressed feeding schedule; this resulted in the mice showing depressive-like symptoms.
- Neuroanatomy: Depressed subjects display decreased hippocampal volume. Rodents exposed to chronic stress or excess glucocorticoids exhibit similar signs of hippocampal loss of neurons and dendritic atrophy.
- Neuroendocrine disturbances: Disturbances of the hypothalamic–pituitary–adrenal axis (HPA) are one of the most consistent symptoms in major depression. The functionality of the HPA can be assessed by dexamethasone suppression test .
- Alterations in sleep architecture: Disturbances in the circadian rhythm and especially in the sleep architecture are often observed in depression. In rodents, it is accessible via electroencephalography (EEG).
- Anxiety-related behavior: Anxiety is a symptom with high prevalence in depression. Animal models of depression often display altered anxiety-related behavior.

=== Criteria for valid animal models of depression ===
An appropriate animal model of human depression should fulfill the following criteria as much as possible: strong phenomenological similarities and similar pathophysiology (face validity), comparable etiology (construct validity), and common treatment (predictive validity). Depression is a heterogeneous disorder and its many symptoms are hard to produce in laboratory animals. When studying depression used in animals originally, symptoms equivalent to odd social behavior and emotion were used to determine if the animal had depression. The question therefore remains whether we can know if the animal is "depressed". They are unable to have the emotions that are associated specifically with humans, like sadness. Few models of depression fully fit these validating criteria, and most models currently used rely on either actions of known antidepressants or responses to stress. It is not necessary for an "ideal" animal model of depression to exhibit all the abnormalities of depression-relevant behaviors, just as not all patients manifest every possible symptom of depression.

== Creating models ==
Research use a number of standardized ways to induce depression-like symptoms in lab animals. The most commonly used type of models are based on stress.

=== Stress models ===
Certain types of human depression are precipitated by stressful life events, and vulnerable individuals experiencing these stressors. Consequently, the majority of animal models of depression are based on the exposure to various types of acute or chronic stressors.

==== Adult stress models ====
- Learned helplessness: The learned helplessness model (LH), one of the well validated animal models, is the best replicated one. The rationale is that exposure to uncontrollable and stressful life events makes people feel like they are losing control, and this sometimes leads to depressive like behaviors. The model is based on the observation that animals also develop deficits in escape, cognitive and rewarded behaviors when they have been subjected to repeated unavoidable and uncontrollable shocks. LH is induced in one day or over several days of repeated inescapable stress by the treating of tail shock or foot shock in shuttle boxes. Helpless behavior is evaluated by analyzing the performance in an active escape test, such as the latency to press a lever or cross a door.
  An advantage of LH is that the cognitive and other behavioral outcomes seem to be correlated, thus helping to understand the depressive symptomatology in humans. This model can also be generally used to measure the escape performance of mice with different mutations in which target genes of depression may affect the vulnerability to develop a depressive-like state. These excellent face and predictive validities make LH an interesting model to explore the pathophysiology of depression. The biggest disadvantage of LH is it requires very strong stressors to induce the behavioral phenotypes which does raise ethical problems. Also, most of the symptoms do not persist long enough following cessation of the uncontrollable shock.
- Chronic mild stress: The chronic mild stress (CMS) model is probably the most valid animal model of depression. It aims to model a chronic depressive-like state that develops gradually over time in response to stress, and they can provide more natural induction. CMS involves the exposure of animals to a series of mild and unpredictable stressors (periods of food and water deprivation, small temperature reductions, changes of cage mates, and other similar individually innocuous manipulations) during at least 2 weeks. The model has been reported to result in long lasting changes of behavioral, neurochemical, neuroimmune, and neuroendocrinological variables. This resembles reward functions, that include decreased intracranial self-stimulation, and reflects anhedonia that is reversed by chronic, but not acute, antidepressant treatment. This CMS model can be used to screen and test potential antidepressant compounds and to develop new treatment strategies.
  The advantages of this model are its good predictive validity (behavioral changes are reversed by chronic treatment with a wide variety of antidepressants), face validity (almost all demonstrable symptoms of depression have been reproduced), and construct validity (CMS causes a generalized decrease in responsiveness to rewards). However, there is a common practical difficulty in carrying out CMS experiments, which are labor-intensive, demanding of space, and of long duration. The procedure can be difficult to be established and data can be hardly replicated.
- Social defeat stress: Social defeat stress (SDS) is a chronic and recurring factor in the lives of virtually all higher animal species. Humans experiencing social defeat show increased symptoms of depression, loneliness, anxiety, social withdrawal and a loss of self-esteem. Since the majority of stress stimuli in humans that lead to psychopathological changes are of social nature, SDS model have gained increasing attention since they might render useful to study certain endophenotypes of depression. During the stress period, the male rodent will be introduced into a different territory of other males for each day as an intruder. This causes it to be investigated, attacked and defeated by the residents. The consequent behavior changes in the subject caused by SDS, like decreased social interaction or lack of interest, are similar to some parts of human depression. Behavioral treatment and antidepressants can reverse these changes in an SDS model.
  Like CMS, SDS has good predictive validity (behavioral changes are reversed by chronic treatment with a wide variety of antidepressants), face validity (many symptoms of depression have been reproduced), and construct validity (causing a generalized decrease in responsiveness to rewards). SDS gives another validity that only chronic, but not acute, antidepressant administration can reverse the social aversion. One disadvantage of SDS model is the long duration. To apply an SDS model for studying human depression, the period of it should last at least 20 days or only anxiety symptoms could be induced. Only male rodents can be used for this model, since female rodents do not fight each other in a resident–intruder confrontation.

==== Early life stress models ====
Early adverse experiences such as traumatic life events in childhood result in an increased sensitivity to the effects of stress later in life and influence the vulnerability to depression. Suitable animal models could provide a basis for understanding potential mechanisms of environmental and developmental factors of individual differences in stress reactivity and vulnerability to disorders. Models of early life stress involve prenatal stress, early postnatal handling and maternal separation. All these treatments have been demonstrated to produce significant effects that last until adulthood.

- Maternal deprivation: The maternal deprivation model is the most widely used early life stress model. This model manipulates the maternal separation of early life deprivation, in which pups are separated from the dam for 1–24 h per day during the first two postnatal weeks. Maternal separation results in increased anxiety- and depression-like behaviors and increased HPA response in adulthood.

=== Other models ===
- Olfactory bulbectomy: Removal of the olfactory bulb in rodents results in a disruption of the limbic-hypothalamic axis with the consequence of behavioral, neurochemical, neuroendocrine and neuroimmune changes. Many of these resemble changes seen in depressed patients. It is still not clear how bulbectomy in animals actually relates to depression in humans; it might simply result from a high intensity of chronic stressor caused by chronic sensory deprivation. This model shows high predictive validity as it mimics the slow onset of antidepressant action reported in clinical studies. It responds chronic, but not sub-chronic, antidepressant treatment and does not response to other drugs.
- Psychostimulant withdrawal (amphetamine, cocaine): In humans, withdrawal from chronic psychostimulants generates symptoms that have strong behavioral and physiological parallels to depression. Therefore, the examination of the behavioral effects of drug withdrawal in rodents may provide insights into the underlying neurobiological mechanisms and aid in the development of animal models of depression that are sensitive to antidepressant agents. Following withdrawal from drugs such as amphetamine or cocaine, rodents display behavioral changes that are highly similar to some aspects of depression in humans, such as anhedonia, and behaviors opposite to those seen after treatment with antidepressant drugs.
- Genetically engineered mice: Only few generated mutant lines can be regarded as depression models, for example, α2A adrenergic receptor knockout mice, glucocorticoid receptor heterozygous mice, and cAMP response element-binding protein overexpressing mice.
- Forward genetics: Forward genetics allows identifying relevant genes without any prior knowledge of genetic to the phenotype. Large scale random mutagenesis screens, like ENU, have resulted in a great number of mutants displaying depression or antidepressant-like behavior.

== Evaluating symptoms ==
The degree of depression-like symptoms in an animal is evaluated using a number of tests. Tests provide a measure of an animal's response to inescapable stress (lack of attempt to escape is seen as despair/hopelessness) and to reward (lack of response indicates anhedonia), or to measure its degree of anxiety.

=== Despair-based ===
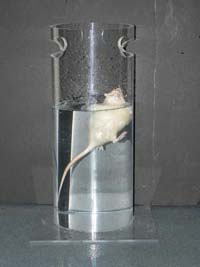
Forced-swimming test

- Forced-swimming test: The forced-swimming test (FST) is based on the observation that animals develop an immobile posture in an inescapable cylinder filled with water. In this test, immobility is interpreted as a passive stress-coping strategy or depression-like behavior (behavioral despair). After antidepressant administration, the animals will actively perform escape-directed behaviors with longer duration than animals with control saline treatment. FST is the most widely used tool in depression research, more specifically as a screen for acute antidepressants.
  The advantages of FST are that it is low-cost and a fast, reliable tool. It is also easy to handle and has proven its reliability across laboratories for testing potential antidepressant activities with a strong predictive validity and it allows rapid screening of large numbers of drugs. The major disadvantages of FST are that it has poor face and construct validities. The test is sensitive to acute treatment only, and its validity for non-monoamine antidepressants is uncertain

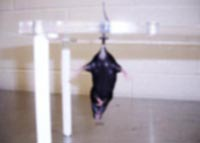
Tail suspension test

- Tail suspension test: The TST, also known as tail suspension test, shares a common theoretical basis and behavioral measure with the FST. In the TST, mice are suspended by their tails using adhesive tape to a horizontal bar for a certain couple of minutes, and the time of immobility is recorded. Typically, the suspended rodents perform immediately escape-like behaviors, followed by developing an immobile posture. If antidepressants are given prior to the test, the subjects will be engaged in escape-directed behaviors for longer periods of time than after saline treatment, exhibiting a decrease in duration of immobility.
  A major advantage of the TST is that it is simple and inexpensive. A major disadvantage of the TST is that it is restricted to mice. Like FST, TST is sensitive to acute treatment only, and its validity for non-monoamine antidepressants is uncertain.

=== Reward-based ===
- Sucrose preference: Rodents are born with an interest in sweet foods or solutions. Reduced preference for sweet solution in sucrose preference test represents anhedonia. This reduction can be reversed by treatment with chronic antidepressants. This test may measure the affective state and motivation of subject rodents; however, the face and construct validity of the sucrose preference test to measure depression-related behavior appears low.
- Intracranial self-stimulation: Intracranial self-stimulation (ICSS) can be utilized in rodents to understand how drugs affect the function of brain reward system. In this paradigm, the animal is trained to spin a wheel to receive a current through electrodes implanted in its own brain for rewarding the hypothalamic stimulation. ICSS shares a common theoretical basis with the sucrose preference. Reduced preference for self-stimulating reward cognition represents a loss of interest, fatigue and a loss of energy. This usually occurs during depressive episodes, but, this reduction can be reversed by treatment with antidepressants. Like sucrose preference test, ICSS can measure the affective state and motivation of subject rodents, and again, further validation is needed for working as a model of depression.

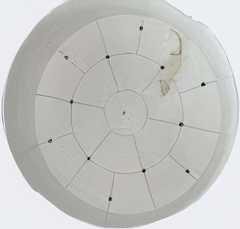
Open field

=== Anxiety-based ===
- Novelty-induced hypophagia: Hypophagia, one of the anxiety symptoms in rodents, is defined as the reduction in feeding in response to novelty, and it can be evoked by various novel features of the environment, including novel food, novel testing environment and novel food containers. Novelty-induced hypophagia (NIH) is a recently developed test which measures the latency and consumption of food in a novel unfamiliar environment. The test rather reflects the anxiolytic effects of antidepressants and the response is seen only after chronic treatment with antidepressants.

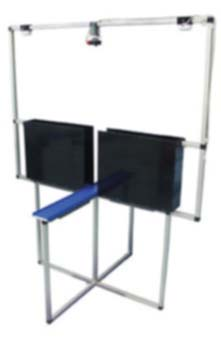
Elevated plus maze

- Open field: Rodents tend to avoid brightly illuminated areas, and this avoidance is interpreted as a symptom of anxiety. Open field is a bright enclosure and during the test rodents are placed in this arena thus forcing them to interact with a bright environment. The movement of the experimental subject will be recorded in distance and pathway.
- Elevated plus maze: For the elevated plus maze test, the rodents are placed at the intersection of the four arms of the maze (two open, two closed), facing an open arm. The number of entries and time spent in each arm is recorded and valid results are obtained in a single 5-minute testing session. An increase in the open-arm time is an index of anti-anxiety behavior of rodents.

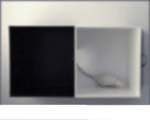
Dark/light box

- Dark/light box: The dark/light box test is also based on the rodents' innate aversion to brightly illuminated areas and on the spontaneous exploratory behavior of the animals. A natural conflict situation occurs when an animal is exposed to an unfamiliar environment or novel objects. The conflict is between the tendency to explore and the initial tendency to avoid the unfamiliar. The exploratory activity reflects the combined result of these tendencies in novel situations. The test apparatus of dark/light box consists of a dark compartment and an illuminated compartment. Drug-induced increases in behaviors in the white part of a two-compartment box are suggested as an index of anxiolytic activity.
- Open field test, elevated plus maze test, and dark/light box test can work as an antidepressant screen by measuring anxiety-related behavior as an accompanying endophenotype of depression. It is known that some antidepressants will cause a decrease in behavior in these tests just like anxiolytics. However, the response to some antidepressants couldn't be detected. These tests each have their own problems and it is difficult to discriminate decreased anxiety-related avoidance from increased novelty-seeking in these tests.

== Benefits of animal models ==
A benefit to this model of research is the production of antidepressants. While antidepressants are helpful, the effects of current antidepressant drugs are often significantly delayed, with improvements beginning around 3–6 weeks after treatment is started. Antidepressant screening tests provide only an end-point behavioral or physiological measure designed to assess the effect of the genetic, pharmacological, or environmental manipulation. This is unlike models which can be defined as an organism or a particular state of an organism that reproduces aspects of human pathology. Despite the clinical success of many antidepressant drugs, such as tricyclic antidepressants (TCAs), monoamine oxidase inhibitors (MAOIs), and serotonin reuptake inhibitors (SRIs), many individuals' symptoms are not adequately alleviated by medication alone, and other methods of treatment may be recommended. Antidepressant and depression research is ongoing. There is a lot more knowledge now and people struggling have access to the tools they need when seeking help. Animal research has been a successful way for experts to gain this knowledge and it continues to have positive impacts in the medical field and beyond.

== See also ==
- Animal testing
- Institutional Animal Care and Use Committees
- Pit of despair, an apparatus used for animal models of clinical depression
- Conditioned avoidance response test § Test of other drug effects
