= Behavioural despair test =

Animal test of antidepressant effectiveness

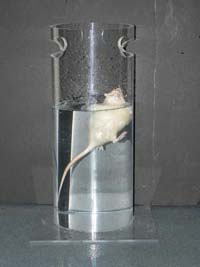
Forced-swimming test

The behavioural despair test (or Porsolt forced swimming test) is a test, centered on a rodent's response to the threat of drowning, whose result has been interpreted as measuring susceptibility to negative mood. It is commonly used to measure the effectiveness of antidepressants, although significant criticisms of its interpretation have been made.

== Method ==
Animals are subjected to two trials during which they are forced to swim in an acrylic glass cylinder filled with water, and from which they cannot escape. The first trial lasts 15 minutes. Then, after 24 hours, a second trial is performed that lasts 5 minutes. The time that the test animal spends in the second trial without making any movements beyond those required to keep its head above water is measured. This immobility time is decreased by various types of antidepressants and also by electroconvulsive shock. Another common variant of this behavioural test specifically used for mice is conducted only for one trial and lasts six minutes. Modern implementations of the test score swimming and climbing behaviours separately, because swimming behaviour has been shown to be increased by selective serotonin reuptake inhibitors, while climbing behaviour is increased by selective norepinephrine reuptake inhibitors such as desipramine and maprotiline.

== Controversy in interpretation ==
Classically, immobility in the second test has been interpreted as a behavioural correlate of negative mood, representing a kind of hopelessness in the animal. Rodents given antidepressants swim harder and longer than controls (which forms the basis for claims of the test's validity). However, there is some debate between scientists whether increased immobility instead demonstrates learning or habituation, and would therefore be a positive behavioural adaptation: the animal is less fearful because it is now familiar with the environment of the test. This interpretation is supported by the fact that even rats who are first put into a container from which they can escape (and therefore do not experience despair) show reduced mobility in the second test.

Some pharmacological compounds that influence motor movement, like stimulants and sedatives, may cause animals to swim for different amounts of time that are unrelated to the antidepressant properties of the compound. Researchers need to assess locomotor activity in the animal's home cage or by a locomotor test. If locomotion is altered compared to controls then other animal antidepressant models should be used.

The term "behavioural despair test" bears an anthropomorphic connotation and is a somewhat subjective description as it is uncertain whether the test reliably gauges mood or despair. Strictly speaking, the descriptive term "forced swimming test" is preferred by researchers. The use of forced swimming tests is criticised by animal rights groups, notably PETA.

== See also ==
- Animal models of depression
- Conditioned avoidance response test
- Curt Richter § In popular culture
- Learned helplessness
- Open field (animal test)
- Tail suspension test
