= WAZX (AM) =

Radio station in Smyrna–Atlanta, Georgia, United States

- Smyrna, Georgia; United States
- Broadcast area: Atlanta metropolitan area
- Frequency: 1550 kHz (AM)
- Branding: WAZX 1550

Programming
- Format: Oldies

Ownership
- Owner: Intelli LLC

History
- First air date: March 1962
- Former call signs: WSMA (1962–1965); WYNX (1965–1993)

Technical information
- Licensing authority: FCC
- Facility ID: 22983
- Class: D
- Power: 100 watts daytime 16 watts nighttime
- Transmitter coordinates: 33°54′54″N 84°35′12″W

Links
- Public license information: Public file; LMS

WAZX (1550 kHz) is a commercial AM radio station licensed to the city of Smyrna, Georgia, and serving the Atlanta metropolitan area. It is currently owned by Tron Dinh Do, through licensee Intelli LLC. The station's old transmitter was located in Powder Springs, Georgia. Until a permanent new site is found the station is operating under an STA from a wooded area of Marietta. They are using a 30M long wire. The azimuth of the wire sends it at approximately 30 degrees covering the whole city by day.

== History ==
In March, 1962, the station first signed on as WSMA. It was a 10,000-watt daytimer, owned by Mitchell Melof.

The radio station has had the WAZX call sign since 1993, when it changed from its long-time WYNX call sign. The WYNX call sign dates back to 1965 when the station switched to a Top 40 radio format from a Middle of the Road (MOR) radio format.

The radio station was formerly a Spanish language station broadcasting a variety format, branded as "La Que Buena", and owned by Ga-Mex Broadcasting from 2001 until 2008. Ga-Mex Broadcasting fell into financial difficulties in 2008. That required the station to go dark from mid-July 2008 until Ga-Mex Broadcasting declared bankruptcy and the station was sold to DTS Broadcasting in 2009.

WAZX was again heard broadcasting on August 3, 2009, during a testing period with only oldies and classic rock music plus the station identification at the top of the hour. This test period began August 1, 2009.

WAZX returned to the air on February 10, 2010, with Spanish language Christian music and talk programming under the "La Estación de la Familia" name.

DTS Broadcasting sold WAZX to Tron Dinh Do's Intelli LLC for a purchase price of $1.55 million; the transaction was consummated on May 21, 2014.

WAZX was again heard broadcasting on March 13, 2015, with only oldies and classic rock music plus the station ID at the top of the hour.

WAZX was on the air for most of 2020, playing continuous oldies music and classic rock (mostly from the '60s to the '80s), interspersed with periodic automated time announcements and a legal ID at the top of the hour. The station went off the air again after the first week of January 2021.
