= Open field (animal test) =

Experimental animal test

Developed by Calvin S. Hall, the open field test (OFT) is an experimental test used to assay general locomotor activity levels, anxiety, and willingness to explore in animals (usually rodents) in scientific research. However, the extent to which behavior in the open field measures anxiety is controversial. The open field test can be used to assess memory by evaluating the ability of the animal to recognize a stimulus or object. Another animal test that is used to assess memory using that same concept is the novel object recognition test.

== Concept ==
Animals such as rats and mice display a natural aversion to brightly lit open areas. However, they also have a drive to explore a perceived threatening stimulus. Decreased levels of anxiety lead to increased exploratory behavior. Increased anxiety will result in less locomotion and a preference to stay close to the walls of the field (thigmotaxis).

== Experimental design ==
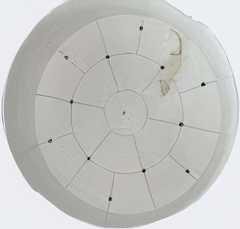
A circular open field

The open field is an arena with walls to prevent escape. Commonly, the field is marked with a grid and square crossings. The center of the field is marked with a different color to differentiate from the other squares. In the modern open field apparatus, infrared beams or video cameras with associated software can be used to automate the assessment process.

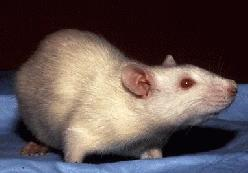
Stretch attend posture

Behavioral patterns measured in the open field test include:

- Line crossings – Frequency with which the rodent crosses grid lines with all four paws (a measure of locomotor activity), sometimes divided into activity near the wall and activity in the center.
- Center square entries – Frequency with which the rodent enters the center square with all four paws.
- Center square duration – Duration of time spent in the central square.
- Rearing – Frequency with which the rodent stands on its hind legs in the field. Rearing-up behavior in which the forepaws of the animal are unsupported and the similar behavior in which the forepaws rest against the walls of the enclosure have different underlying genetic and neural mechanisms and unsupported rearing might be a more direct measure of anxiety.
- Stretch attend postures – Frequency with which rodent demonstrated forward elongation of the head and shoulders followed by retraction to the original position. High frequency indicates high levels of anxiety.
- Defecation and urination – The frequency of defecation and urination is controversial. Some scientists argue that increase in defecation shows increased anxiety. Other scientists disagree and state that defecation and urination show signs of emotionality but cannot be assumed to be anxiety.

While the aforementioned characteristics usually have a straightforward physical interpretation when examined individually, they often fail to fully capture the complexity of animal movement patterns. Consequently, more advanced multiparametric models are necessary to uncover additional significant insights that may be obscured by the interactions among these characteristics. Recent research has demonstrated that anomalous diffusion in fractional Brownian motion (fBm) models can effectively characterize typical animal movement patterns through two distinct asymptotic scaling regimes, which are separated by a specific crossover point. This crossover point is shown to depend on the neurophysiological condition of the animal subjects involved in the experiments. Furthermore, the movement model identified in this study is linked to conventional parameters, such as level crossing statistics that describe zone transition events. This connection allows for the reproduction of scalar metrics traditionally used in the characterization of open field test results from a model-based perspective, thereby enhancing the interpretability of the results within conventional frameworks.

The paper presents an early validation of an innovative animal tracking tool and a model-based approach to gait analysis. The methodology primarily leverages random walk class models, including fractional Brownian motion (fBm) and its modifications. These models have garnered significant attention in recent years for their applications in animal tracking and behavioral analysis. Unlike traditional approaches that rely on multiple movement parameters or artificial combinations of various models, the fBm-based models are characterized by a limited number of free parameters. These parameters are straightforward to interpret physically, making the models not only efficient but also intuitive.

== Criticisms ==
The assumption that the test is based on conflict has been heavily criticized. Critics point out that when measuring anxiety each choice should have both positive and negative outcomes. This leads to more dependable observations which the OFT does not present.

When the test was first developed, it was pharmacologically validated through the use of benzodiazepines, a common anxiety medication. Newer drugs such as 5-HT-1A partial agonists and selective serotonin reuptake inhibitors, which have also been proven to treat anxiety, show inconsistent results in this test.

Due to the idiopathic nature of anxiety, animal models have flaws that cannot be controlled. Because of this it is better to do the open field test in conjunction with other tests such as the elevated plus maze and light-dark box test.

Different results can be obtained depending on the strain of the animal. Different equipment and grid lines may cause different results.

== See also ==
- Animal models of depression
- Forced swim test
- Hole-board test
- Tail suspension test
