= WAZX-FM =

- Cleveland, Georgia; United States
- Frequency: 101.9 MHz
- Branding: La Que Buena 101.9

Programming
- Format: Regional Mexican

Ownership
- Owner: WAZX-FM, Inc.

History
- First air date: 1989
- Former call signs: WGGA-FM, WCGX, WGZM

Technical information
- Licensing authority: FCC
- Facility ID: 71198
- Class: A
- ERP: 350 watts
- HAAT: 409.7 meters (1,344 ft)
- Transmitter coordinates: 34°33′49″N 83°38′26″W

Links
- Public license information: Public file; LMS
- Website: LaQueBuenaAtlanta.com

WAZX-FM (101.9 MHz) is a commercial FM radio station broadcasting a Regional Mexican radio format. It is licensed to Cleveland, Georgia. WAZX-FM is owned by WAZX-FM, Inc. The studios and offices are on Venture Drive in Duluth, Georgia. The transmitter is in Clermont, Georgia.

== History ==
In the late 1980s, Terry Barnhardt of Gainesville, Georgia, secured a Federal Communications Commission construction permit to build an FM radio station northwest of Atlanta. The FCC gave the proposed station the call sign WGGA-FM.

The station first signed on the air in 1989, as WGGA-FM, known on the air as "Georgia 101.9". In 1991, it was bought by Advantage Media for $1.18 million. It later had the call letters WGZM, WCGX before changing to WAZX in 1994.

In 2001, the station's call letters changed again, this time to WAZX-FM. It was acquired by a firm calling itself WAZX-FM, Inc. The price of the station had dropped since the previous sale. The new owners paid $60,000.
