= Maternal sensitivity =

Mother's ability to perceive her child's behavioural signals

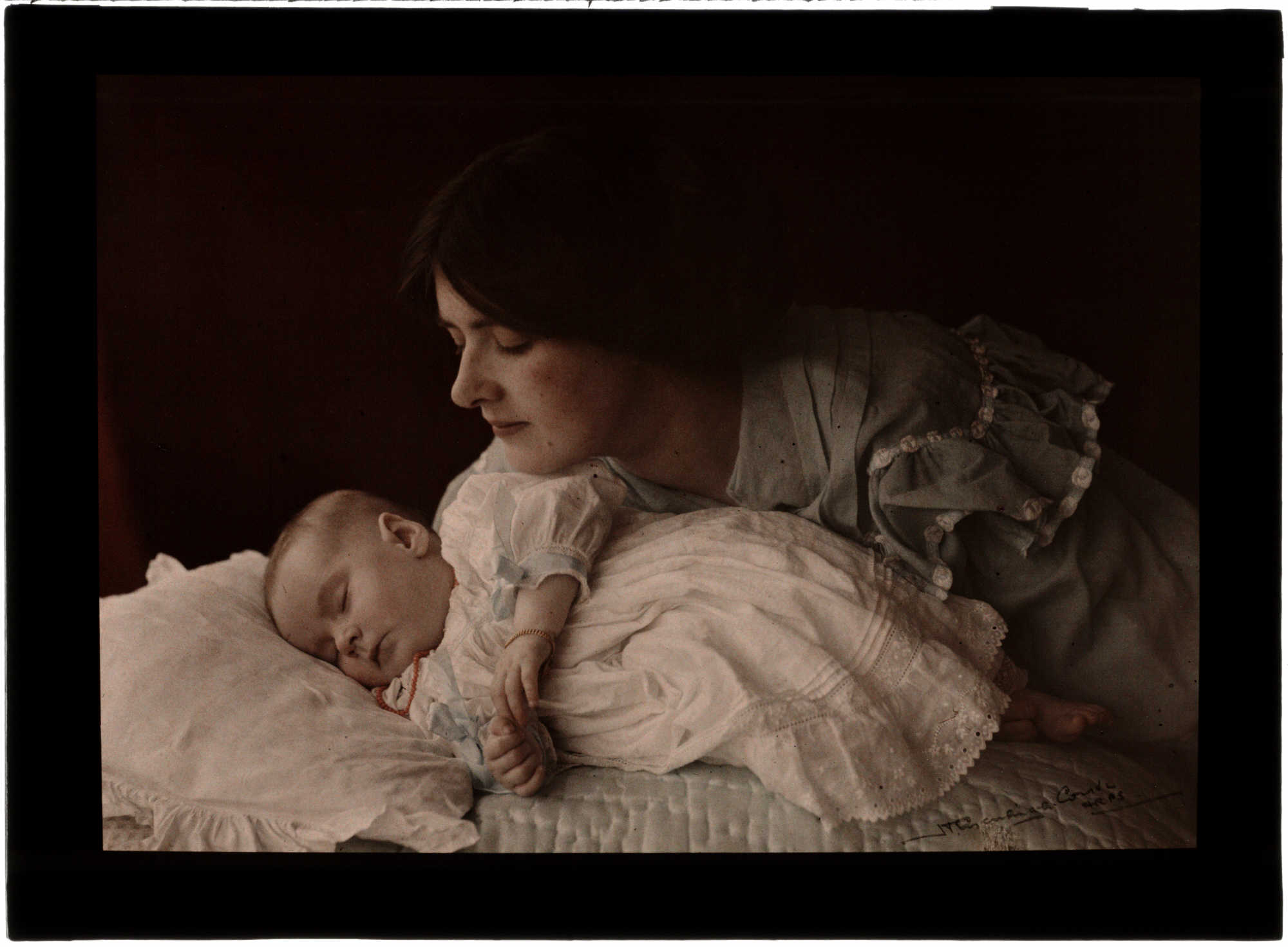
A mother and her child in 1912. Mothers who better understand their infant's signals are said to have higher maternal sensitivity.

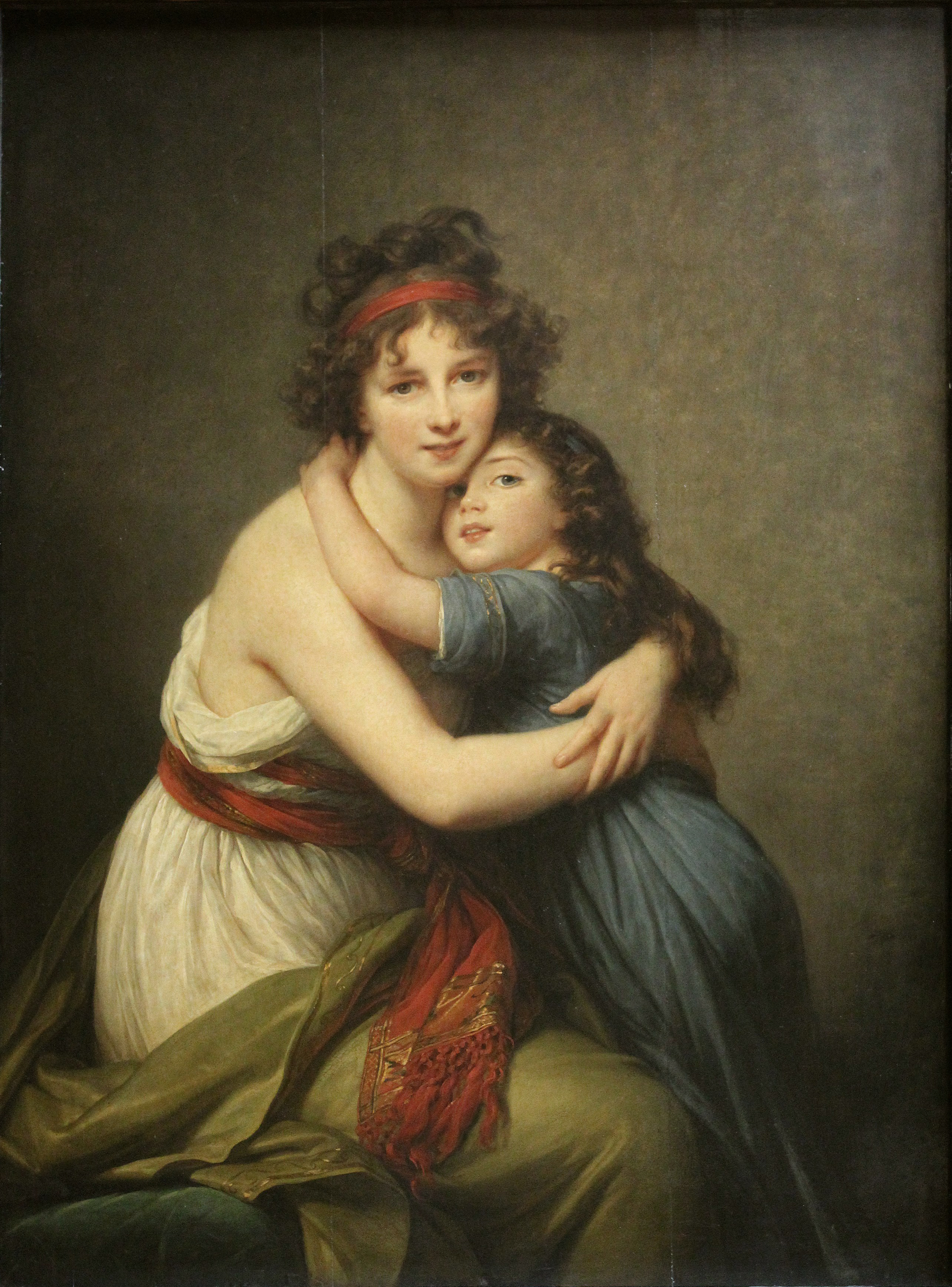
Self-portait of Élisabeth Vigée Le Brun with her daughter (1789).

Maternal sensitivity is a mother's ability to perceive and infer the meaning behind her infant's behavioural signals, and to respond to them promptly and appropriately. Maternal sensitivity affects child development at all stages through life, from infancy, all the way to adulthood. In general, more sensitive mothers have healthier, more socially and cognitively developed children than those who are not as sensitive. Also, maternal sensitivity has been found to affect the person psychologically even as an adult. Adults who experienced high maternal sensitivity during their childhood were found to be more secure than those who experienced less sensitive mothers. Once the adult becomes a parent themselves, their own understanding of maternal sensitivity will affect their own children's development. Some research suggests that adult mothers display more maternal sensitivity than adolescent mothers who may in turn have children with a lower IQ and reading level than children of adult mothers.

There are different ways of assessing maternal sensitivity, such as through the use of naturalistic observation, the Strange Situation, maternal-synchrony, and maternal mind-mindedness. There are also a number of ways of measuring maternal sensitivity in the scientific world, which include Ainsworth's Maternal Sensitivity Scale (AMSS), the Maternal Behaviour Q-sort (MBQS), and the Pederson and Moran Sensitivity Q-Sort.

== Description ==
Maternal sensitivity was first defined by Mary Ainsworth as "a mother's ability to perceive and interpret accurately her infant's signals and communications and then respond appropriately". It was later revised by Karl and Broom in 1995 as "a mother's ability to recognize infant cues consistently and act on those cues, and the ability to monitor and accurately interpret infant cues, as evidenced by mother–child interactions that are contingent, reciprocal and affectively positive". It can be generally defined as a broad concept combining a variety of behavioral care giving attributes.

The research on maternal sensitivity follows earlier work in psychoanalytics and is especially rooted in attachment theory. As the focus of psychoanalytics shifted from individuals (particularly adults) to children, research studies on mother–infant dyads, on the effects of early childhood on development, and on pregnancy became wider. A psychologist named John Bowlby eventually developed the attachment theory in 1969. Mary Ainsworth, who worked with Bowlby, along with her colleagues created the concept of maternal sensitivity in 1978 in order to describe early mother–infant interaction observed in her empirical studies.

There are four important aspects of maternal sensitivity: dynamic process involving maternal abilities, reciprocal give-and-take with the infant, contingency on the infant's behavior, and quality of maternal behaviors.

Maternal sensitivity is dynamic, elastic and can change over time. A sensitive mother needs to be able to perceive the cues and signals her baby gives her, interpret them correctly and act appropriately. The three most positive affecting factors for the baby are a mother's social support, maternal–fetal attachment and high self-esteem. The three most negative affecting factors are maternal depression, maternal stress, and maternal anxiety. Recent studies have shown that maternal posttraumatic stress disorder (PTSD) can negatively impact a mother's sensitivity during stressful moments with her child that serve as traumatic reminders and that this quite likely has a neural basis in the maternal brain.

== Assessment ==
=== Naturalistic observation ===
Maternal sensitivity is most commonly assessed during naturalistic observation of free play interactions between mother and child. There are several factors surrounding assessment during observation that may cause differences in results, including the setting (home vs laboratory), the context (free play vs structured task), the length of observation and the frequency of observation. While some observational studies focus strictly on the relationship between mother and child during close interaction such as feeding or free play, other studies look into how well the maternal figure divides her attention between the baby and other everyday activities. The latter was demonstrated in an experiment conducted by Atkinson et al. where mothers were given a questionnaire to act as a "distractor task", and were assessed on their ability to effectively divide their attention between the "distractor task" and their child. In regards to length of observation, some studies require no more than a one-time 10-minute assessment, while other studies used a much lengthier time.

=== Strange Situation ===
The Strange Situation was developed by Mary Ainsworth in the 1970s to assess attachment relationships between caregivers and children between 9 and 18 months old. Because maternal sensitivity is an indicator of attachment relationship, researchers sometimes use the Strange Situation to observe attachment so that they may use the results to predict and infer the level of maternal sensitivity.

In the Strange Situation, the toddler's behavior and stress is observed during a 21-minute free-play session through a one-way glass window as the caregiver and strangers come into and leave the room. The specific sequence of events is as follows:

1. The mother and child are alone. Observation of the use of the mother as a secure base, who fosters exploratory behavior and independence.
2. A stranger enters the room, which shows the effects of stranger anxiety.
3. The mother leaves the child, which shows the effects of separation anxiety. The stranger tries to comfort the child, which tests the effects of stranger anxiety.
4. The mother returns and the stranger leaves. Observation of reunion behavior.
5. The parent leaves and the child once more; separation anxiety is tested for.
6. The stranger returns and tries to comfort the infant; stranger anxiety is tested for.
7. The parent returns and the stranger leaves. Once more, observation of reunion behavior.

The children are observed and categorized into one of the four attachment patterns – secure attachment, anxious-ambivalent attachment, anxious-avoidant attachment, or disorganized attachment – based on the infant's separation anxiety, willingness to explore, stranger anxiety, and reunion behavior.

=== Mother–infant synchrony and maternal mind-mindedness ===
Two related qualitative concepts that are correlated with maternal sensitivity are mother–infant synchrony and maternal mind-mindedness.

In mother–infant synchrony, the mother and infant's ability to change their own behaviour based on the other's response is taken into consideration. Infant affect (vocal and facial) and maternal stimulation (vocal and tactile) are good indicators of mother–infant synchrony. Zentall et al. found that infants' rhythm was stronger and interactions were led better at 5 months than at 3 months. According to the study, an infant's ability to send signals and a mother's ability to perceive them increase with synchrony over time. Studies have shown that mother–infant synchrony will result in the infant's development of self-control and other self-regulating behaviours later on in life.

The related concept of maternal mind-mindedness assesses the mother's ability to understand and verbalize the infant's mind: thoughts, desires, intentions and memories. Maternal mind-mindedness has been found to be related to some developmental results, such as attachment security. A caregiver's comment is deemed an appropriate mind-related comment if the comment was deemed to match the infant's behaviour by the independent coder, if the comment associated the infant's current activity to past activities, and/or if the comment encouraged the infant to go on with his or her intentions when the conversation paused. This correlates to high maternal mind-mindedness. If the caregiver assigns the wrong internal state to the baby's behaviour, if the comment about the current activity is not insufficiently associated with a past event, if the comment deters the infant from proceeding with the current activity, and/or if the comment is unclear, it is deemed a in-appropriate mind-related comment and correlates to low mind-mindedness.

== Role of maternal sensitivity in development ==
=== Infancy ===
Infants whose mothers are more sensitive are more likely to display secure attachment relationships. Because the maternal figure is generally accessible and responsive to the infant's needs, the infant is able to form expectations of the mother's behaviour. Once expectations are met and the infant feels a consistency in the mother's sensitivity, the infant is able to find security in the maternal figure. Those infants whose mothers do not respond to the signals from their children or respond inappropriately to their children's cries for attention will form insecure and anxious attachments because the infants are unable to consistently depend on the maternal figures for predictable and safe responses.

In order for the infant to feel that the maternal figure is accessible and responsive, a certain amount of interaction must occur. Though the most research has been done on face-to-face interaction, studies have found that bodily interaction is also important in sensitivity and development. It is not how often the baby is held that reflects attachment, but how the baby is held and whether or not the baby desires to be held that matters in attachment development. Another factor that is important is sensitivity to the infant's feeding signals. There lies some controversy in whether infants who form insecure attachment relationships with their mothers do so because the mother is particularly insensitive to her child's needs or because of differences in their personality (i.e. their temperament) and due to life situations.

=== Childhood ===
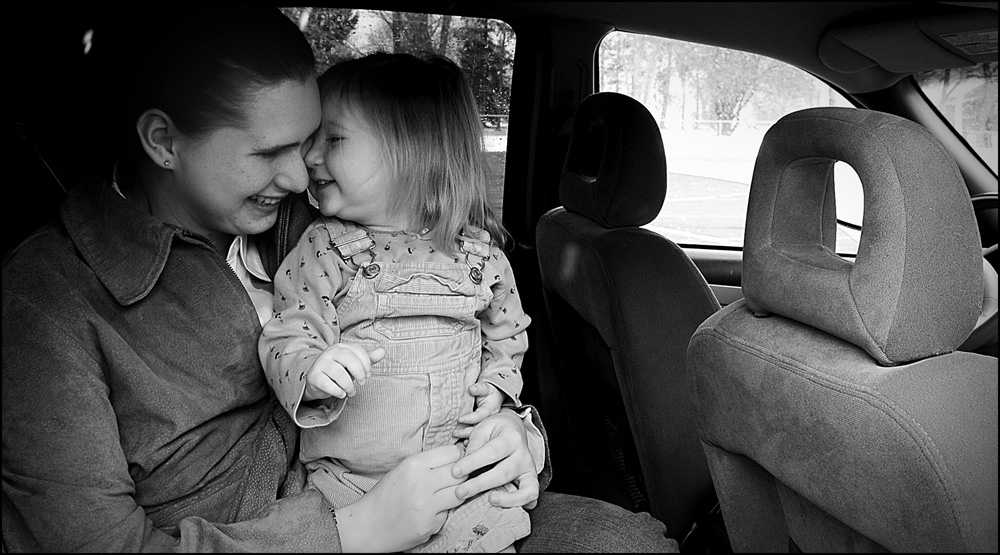
Children whose mothers have higher levels of maternal sensitivity are generally happier, healthier, smarter, and better behaved.

There is a crucial interplay between parenting and child characteristics such as health, temperament, development and cognition. The children with the most sensitive, consistent mothers are the ones who are generally most healthy, happy and well adapted.

==== Health in childhood ====
Maternal sensitivity even in the first few months of mother–child relationships are an important factor to health in childhood, especially with obesity. A study using data from the National Institute of Child Health and Human Development's Study of Early Child Care and Youth Development assessed mother–child interactions and categorized them in one of two groups: sensitive or insensitive. Their child's growth (height and weight) was monitored throughout their childhood, from 24 months all the way to grade six, and body mass index was calculated. As the children grew, the percentage of overweight or obese grew too. From 24 months the overall overweight-obese percentage was 15.58% and by grade six, 34.34% of the children were classified as overweight or obese. More interesting is the difference between the maternal sensitive group and the maternal insensitive group. The children with the sensitive mothers started out with an overweight-obese percentage of 14.96% (24 months) and ended the research with 29.54% (grade six). The children classified with insensitive mothers had an overweight-obese percentage of 16.16% at 24 months and 39.28% at grade six. This shows a significant correlation between the mother's sensitivity and the child's risk for overweight-obesity during their elementary years. This is very important for obesity prevention programs for children.

==== Temperament in childhood ====
Current studies have shown a correlation between maternal sensitivity or insensitivity, negative discipline and childhood aggression. An experiment sampling 117 mother–child pairs showed a unique relationship between the mother's sensitivity and the use of discipline and the child's temperament level. Observations (of the mother's sensitivity to the child's needs, the child's aggression and temperament level and the relationship between the two) were made when the children on average were 26.71 months old (range of 13.58 to 41.91 months). The data were collected again a year later. Results show a year later that negative discipline is correlated with child aggression, but only when that mother is insensitive.

==== Development in childhood ====
A study by Jay Belsky and R.M. Pasco Fearon tested the correlation between childhood development and the sensitivity of the mother. The hypotheses were:

- secure attachment (observed at 15 months) and maternal sensitivity (observed at 24 months) produced the highest competencies in three-year-old children,
- the least competent children would have a history of insecure attachment and maternal insensitivity,
- and the children reared with mixed or inconsistency would fall in between.

The children were tested in five developmental categories: problem behavior, social competence, expressive language, receptive language and school readiness. Results highly support the hypothesis (i.e. maternal sensitivity and childhood development are positively correlated.) This is an important issue as it shows how influential the early experience of a child affects their future development.

==== Cognition in childhood ====
Mothers who were found to display higher sensitivity towards their children from preschool to first grade were found to have higher achieving children than those who displayed lower maternal sensitivity. The children of maternally sensitive mothers scored higher in math and phoneme knowledge than those who had a history of lower maternal sensitivity.

Maternal sensitivity has been shown to teach infants attentional skills, which are necessary later in life for emotional control, and other more complex cognitive processes.

In families with more than one child (twins or triplets), it has been found that maternal sensitivity is lower, as there are more needs to be taken care of by the mother and less time to form a unique bond, which in turn results in decreased cognitive development in the infants (relative to if the child were raised alone). Furthermore, in the newborn period, women who displayed high maternal sensitivity had children who were able to regulate their emotions and who had higher symbolic and cognitive skills. In the case of the triplets, the child that received the least maternal sensitivity was the one that showed the poorest outcomes cognitively and had the most medical problems.

==== Socialization in childhood ====
Maternal sensitivity has been shown to have an effect on children's socialization skills. In particular, some research suggests that children of more sensitive caregivers have high levels of effortful (i.e. emotional and behavioural) control. Such control is proposed to have been fostered from the infancy stage when the a sensitive mother's quick and appropriate responses to the baby's distress teaches the baby to adjust his/her arousal. This speedy regulation of arousal is then adapted into childhood resulting in the ability to regulate emotion and behaviour well.

Caregiver sensitivity has also been found to have a connection with empathy in children. Generally, securely attached children have been found to be more empathetic compared with insecurely attached children. The reasoning suggested for this result is that because securely attached children receive more empathy from caregivers during times that they themselves are distressed, they are more likely to show empathy in a situation where someone else is distressed.

=== Adulthood ===
Adults' own understanding of maternal sensitivity affects their sensitivity towards their own children. Adults who had insensitive mothers during infancy were found to not be able to remember specific childhood events or their importance. They were not able to present an accurate description of their parents by use of memories, they were found to idealize experiences and are more likely to remember situations in which they were rejected. Adults who experienced higher maternal sensitivity during both infancy and adulthood were found to be less dismissive and more secure than those who did not. Adults who are preoccupied were found to also try to please their parents as they were young, and have a sense of anger towards them. About half of the adults who were found more preoccupied than others were found to have experienced divorce between their parents earlier in life, as well as other negative life events such as death of a parent or sexual abuse. These life events cause the security of attachment between mother and child to decrease as the mother's availability, as well as responsiveness may decrease, no matter the maternal sensitivity experienced prior to these events. Male adults were found to have experienced less maternal sensitivity earlier in life than females and were more likely to be classified as dismissive than females were.

== Difference in maternal sensitivity in adult and teen mothers ==
Maternal sensitivity has been found to be greater for adult mothers than for adolescent mothers. The level and quality of mind-mindedness, which refers to how prone the mother is to comment about the infant's mental activity during interaction, is higher in adult mothers, and has been related to greater maternal sensitivity. The comments made by adult mothers were found to be more positive than those made by adolescent mothers. Adolescent mothers used almost no positive comments, but instead negative comments. This causes the adolescent mother to be more insensitive to their baby's needs, possibly because of lack of need understanding, and therefore have lower maternal sensitivity and a less secure attachment to their infants.

Maternal sensitivity in adolescent mothers can be predicted prenatally. Mothers who talked lively and positively about their future relationship with the child were found to display higher maternal sensitivity than those who did not (classified as autonomous mothers). Autonomous mothers were also found to have infants with a more secure attachment. Adolescent mothers who were not classified as autonomous were found to have anxiously attached infants. Furthermore, adolescent mothers were found to have children four–eight years old with lower IQs and a below-average reading level, than did adult mothers.

Although adolescent mothers have been found to display lower maternal sensitivity, there is no evidence that maternal age itself has a negative effect on child development, as other factors at that age such as education and financial status may play a role in the insensitivity of the mother towards the child as well.

== Measurement ==
=== Ainsworth's Maternal Sensitivity Scale (AMSS) ===
Mary Ainsworth developed Ainsworth's Maternal Sensitivity Scale (AMSS) to use as a measure in her Baltimore longitudinal study (1963). The scale is based on naturalistic observations completed by Ainsworth over a period of several hours and thus has no short procedure outline. Her method uses a nine-point scale (nine being very high and one being very low) in a number of important maternal traits. In order for this measurement to be accurate, it is essential that the researcher has developed good observations and insight into the behaviour of the caregiver.

- Sensitivity vs. insensitivity to signals: This scale measures the how well the maternal figure is able to perceive and correctly interpret what the baby is giving signs of or signalling through behaviour and how appropriately the maternal figure is able to respond to them. The scale ranges from highly sensitive to highly insensitive.
- Cooperation vs. interference with ongoing behavior: This scale measures how badly the maternal figure's timing of tasks interrupt the baby's own activities rather than with consideration to the baby's mood and interest. The scale ranges from conspicuously cooperative to highly interfering.
- Acceptance vs. rejection of infant's needs: This scale measures the maternal figure's good and bad feelings towards her baby. The scale ranges from highly accepting to highly rejecting.
- Accessibility vs ignoring: This scale measures the maternal figure's accessibility and responsiveness to the baby. The scale ranges from highly accessible to highly inaccessible, ignoring or neglecting.

=== Maternal Behaviour Q-sort (MBQS) ===
Maternal Behaviour Q-sort (MBQS) was developed by David Pederson, Greg Moran and Sandi Bento to measure maternal sensitivity. It has been used to measure a variety of studies including home based and video-recorded observations. The measures are defined using q-factor analyses. The standard version of the Q-sort consists of 90 items that measure maternal sensitivity with regards to accessibility, responsiveness and promptness to the child's needs and there are many variations. In order to measure sensitivity, observers sort the items into nine piles of ten based on correspondence between the observed behaviour and the item. The maternal sensitivity score is calculated by comparing the descriptive sort and the criterion sort (prototypical sensitive mother). Pederson and Moran based their Q-sort on the Waters Attachment Q-Set, which is an assessment of the behavior of children.

=== Pederson and Moran Sensitivity Q-Sort ===
The Pederson and Moran Sensitivity Q-Sort was developed by Pederson D.R., Moran G., Sitko C., Campbell K., and Ghesquire K. in 1990. Similar to Ainsworth's Maternal Sensitivity Scales, the Pederson and Moran Sensitivity Q-Sort was designed to detect changes in maternal sensitivity with relation to infant behaviour.

=== Related measures ===
The Atypical Maternal Behavior Instrument for Assessment and Classification (AMBIANCE) scale was developed by Elisa Bronfman, Elizabeth Parsons and Karlen Lyons-Ruth. It was developed to measure the extent to which the parent failed to follow into the intentional or affective direction of the baby's communications by engaging in contradictory responses to infant cues or failing to respond to infant cues altogether. AMBIANCE has the following five dimensions:

- Affective Communication Errors (e.g., talks in inviting voice, but physically blocks infant's access)
- Role Confusion: (e.g., draws attention to self when infant is in need)
- Disorientation: (e.g., appears confused, hesitant, or frightened with infant; incongruous affect)
- Negative-Intrusive Behavior: (e.g., mocks or teases infant)
- Withdrawing Behavior: (e.g., fails to initiate interaction, does not greet infant after separation)
