= Attachment in children =

Biological instinct

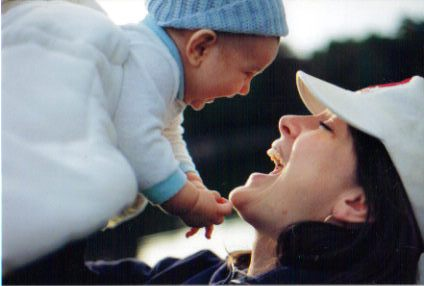
Mother and child

Attachment in children is "a biological instinct in which proximity to an attachment figure is sought when the child senses or perceives threat or discomfort. Attachment behaviour anticipates a response by the attachment figure which will remove threat or discomfort". Attachment also describes the function of availability, which is the degree to which the authoritative figure is responsive to the child's needs and shares communication with them. Childhood attachment can define characteristics that will shape the child's sense of self, their forms of emotion-regulation, and how they carry out relationships with others. Attachment is found in all mammals to some degree, especially primates.

Attachment theory has led to a new understanding of child development. Children develop different patterns of attachment based on experiences and interactions with their caregivers at a young age. Four different attachment classifications have been identified in children: secure attachment, anxious-ambivalent attachment, anxious-avoidant attachment, and disorganized attachment. Attachment theory has become the dominant theory used today in the study of infant and toddler behavior and in the fields of infant mental health, treatment of children, and related fields.

== Attachment theory and children ==
Attachment theory (developed by the psychoanalyst Bowlby 1969, 1973, 1980) is rooted in post-World War Two notions of the traditional female-male division of labour in Westernized nuclear families and the ethological notion that a newborn child is biologically programmed to seek proximity with caregivers, and this proximity-seeking behavior evolved in the Stone Age. Through repeated attempts to seek physical and emotional closeness with a caregiver and the responses the child gets, the child is hypothesised to develop an internal working model (IWM) that reflects the response of the caregiver to the child. According to Bowlby, attachment provides a secure base from which the child can explore the environment, a haven of safety to which the child can return when he or she is afraid or fearful. Bowlby's colleague Mary Ainsworth identified that an important factor which determines whether a child will have a secure or insecure attachment is the degree of sensitivity shown by their caregiver:

The theory interprets a sensitive caregiver as someone who responds socially to attempts to initiate social interaction, playfully to his or her attempts to initiate play. The caregiver picks the child up when s/he seems to wish it, and puts them down when s/he wants to explore. When s/he is distressed, the sensitive caregiver knows what kinds and degree of soothing the child requires to be comforted – and knows that sometimes a few words or a distraction will be all that is needed. On the other hand, the caregiver who responds 'insensitively' tries to socialize with the baby when s/he is hungry, play with her or him when tired, or offer food when s/he is trying to initiate social interaction.

However, it should be recognized that "even sensitive caregivers get it right only about 50 percent of the time. Their communications are either out of synch, or mismatched. There are times when parents feel tired or distracted. The telephone rings or there is breakfast to prepare. In other words, attuned interactions rupture quite frequently. But the hallmark of a sensitive caregiver is that the ruptures are managed and repaired."

== Attachment classification in children: the Strange Situation Protocol ==
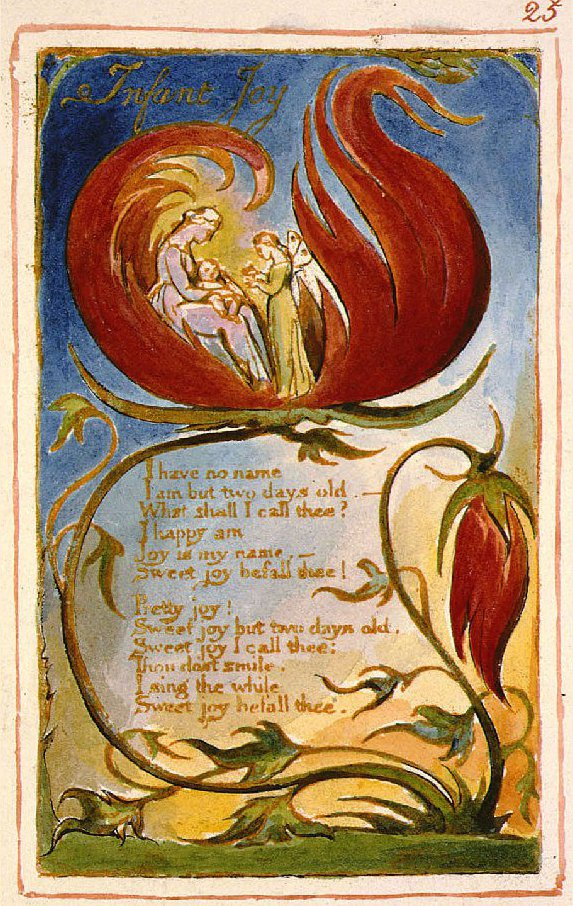
William Blake's poem "Infant Joy" explores how to name a child and feel emotionally attached to it. This copy, Copy AA, printed and painted in 1826, is currently held by the Fitzwilliam Museum.

The most common and empirically supported method for assessing attachment in infants (12 months – 20 months) is the Strange Situation Protocol, developed by Mary Ainsworth as a result of her careful in-depth observations of infants with their mothers in Uganda(see below). The Strange Situation Protocol is a research, not a diagnostic, tool and the resulting attachment classifications are not 'clinical diagnoses.' While the procedure may be used to supplement clinical impressions, the resulting classifications should not be confused with the clinically diagnosed 'Reactive Attachment Disorder (RAD).' The clinical concept of RAD differs in a number of fundamental ways from the theory and research driven attachment classifications based on the Strange Situation Procedure. The idea that insecure attachments are synonymous with RAD is, in fact, not accurate and leads to ambiguity when formally discussing attachment theory as it has evolved in the research literature. This is not to suggest that the concept of RAD is without merit, but rather that the clinical and research conceptualizations of insecure attachment and attachment disorder are not synonymous.

The 'Strange Situation' is a laboratory procedure used to assess infant patterns of attachment to their caregiver. In the procedure, the mother and infant are placed in an unfamiliar playroom equipped with toys while a researcher observes/records the procedure through a one-way mirror. The procedure consists of eight sequential episodes in which the child experiences both separation from and reunion with the mother as well as the presence of an unfamiliar stranger. The protocol is conducted in the following format unless modifications are otherwise noted by a particular researcher:

- Episode 1: Mother (or other familiar caregiver), Baby, Experimenter (30 seconds)
- Episode 2: Mother, Baby (3 mins)
- Episode 3: Mother, Baby, Stranger (3 mins or less)
- Episode 4: Stranger, Baby (3 mins)
- Episode 5: Mother, Baby (3 mins)
- Episode 6: Baby Alone (3 mins or less)
- Episode 7: Stranger, Baby (3 mins or less)
- Episode 8: Mother, Baby (3 mins)

Mainly on the basis of their reunion behaviours (although other behaviours are taken into account) in the Strange Situation Paradigm (Ainsworth et al., 1978; see below), infants can be categorized into three 'organized' attachment categories: Secure (Group B); Avoidant (Group A); and Anxious/Resistant (Group C). There are subclassifications for each group (see below). A fourth category, termed Disorganized (D), can also be assigned to an infant assessed in the Strange Situation although a primary 'organized' classification is always given for an infant judged to be disorganized. Each of these groups reflects a different kind of attachment relationship with the mother. A child may have a different type of attachment to each parent as well as to unrelated caregivers. Attachment style is thus not so much a part of the child's thinking, but is characteristic of a specific relationship. However, after about age five the child exhibits one primary consistent pattern of attachment in relationships.

The pattern the child develops after age five demonstrates the specific parenting styles used during the developmental stages within the child. These attachment patterns are associated with behavioural patterns and can help further predict a child's future personality.

== Attachment patterns ==
"The strength of a child's attachment behaviour in a given circumstance does not indicate the 'strength' of the attachment bond. Some insecure children will routinely display very pronounced attachment behaviours, while many secure children find that there is no great need to engage in either intense or frequent shows of attachment behaviour".

=== Secure attachment ===
A toddler who is securely attached to their parent (or other familiar caregiver) will explore freely while the caregiver is present, typically engages with strangers, is often visibly upset when the caregiver departs, and is generally happy to see the caregiver return. The extent of exploration and of distress are affected by the child's temperamental make-up and by situational factors as well as by attachment status, however. A child's attachment is largely influenced by their primary caregiver's sensitivity to their needs. Parents who consistently (or almost always) respond to their child's needs will create securely attached children. Such children are certain that their parents will be responsive to their needs and communications.

In the traditional Ainsworth et al. (1978) coding of the Strange Situation, secure infants are denoted as "Group B" infants and they are further subclassified as B1, B2, B3, and B4. Although these subgroupings refer to different stylistic responses to the comings and goings of the caregiver, they were not given specific labels by Ainsworth and colleagues, although their descriptive behaviours led others (including students of Ainsworth) to devise a relatively 'loose' terminology for these subgroups. B1's have been referred to as 'secure-reserved', B2's as 'secure-inhibited', B3's as 'secure-balanced,' and B4's as 'secure-reactive.' In academic publications however, the classification of infants (if subgroups are denoted) is typically simply "B1" or "B2" although more theoretical and review-oriented papers surrounding attachment theory may use the above terminology.

Securely attached children are best able to explore when they have the knowledge of a secure base to return to in times of need. When assistance is given, this bolsters the sense of security and also, assuming the parent's assistance is helpful, educates the child in how to cope with the same problem in the future. Therefore, secure attachment can be seen as the most adaptive attachment style. According to some psychological researchers, a child becomes securely attached when the parent is available and able to meet the needs of the child in a responsive and appropriate manner. At infancy and early childhood, if parents are caring and attentive towards their children, those children will be more prone to secure attachment.

=== Anxious-resistant insecure attachment ===
Anxious-resistant insecure attachment is also called ambivalent attachment. In general, a child with an anxious-resistant attachment style will typically explore little (in the Strange Situation) and is often wary of strangers, even when the caregiver is present. When the caregiver departs, the child is often highly distressed. The child is generally ambivalent when they return. The Anxious-Ambivalent/Resistant strategy is a response to unpredictably responsive caregiving, and that the displays of anger or helplessness towards the caregiver on reunion can be regarded as a conditional strategy for maintaining the availability of the caregiver by preemptively taking control of the interaction.

The C1 subtype is coded when:

"...resistant behavior is particularly conspicuous. The mixture of seeking and yet resisting contact and interaction has an unmistakably angry quality and indeed an angry tone may characterize behavior in the preseparation episodes..."

The C2 subtype is coded when:

"Perhaps the most conspicuous characteristic of C2 infants is their passivity. Their exploratory behavior is limited throughout the SS and their interactive behaviors are relatively lacking in active initiation. Nevertheless, in the reunion episodes they obviously want proximity to and contact with their mothers, even though they tend to use signalling rather than active approach, and protest against being put down rather than actively resisting release...In general the C2 baby is not as conspicuously angry as the C1 baby."

=== Anxious-avoidant insecure attachment ===
A child with the anxious-avoidant insecure attachment style will avoid or ignore the caregiver – showing little emotion when the caregiver departs or returns. The child will not explore very much regardless of who is there. Infants classified as anxious-avoidant (A) represented a puzzle in the early 1970s. They did not exhibit distress on separation, and either ignored the caregiver on their return (A1 subtype) or showed some tendency to approach together with some tendency to ignore or turn away from the caregiver (A2 subtype). Ainsworth and Bell theorised that the apparently unruffled behaviour of the avoidant infants is in fact as a mask for distress, a hypothesis later evidenced through studies of the heart-rate of avoidant infants.

Infants are depicted as anxious-avoidant insecure when there is:

"...conspicuous avoidance of the mother in the reunion episodes which is likely to consist of ignoring her altogether, although there may be some pointed looking away, turning away, or moving away...If there is a greeting when the mother enters, it tends to be a mere look or a smile...Either the baby does not approach his mother upon reunion, or they approach in 'abortive' fashions with the baby going past the mother, or it tends to only occur after much coaxing...If picked up, the baby shows little or no contact-maintaining behavior; he tends not to cuddle in; he looks away and he may squirm to get down."

Ainsworth's narrative records showed that infants avoided the caregiver in the stressful Strange Situation Procedure when they had a history of experiencing rebuff of attachment behaviour. The child's needs are frequently not met and the child comes to believe that communication of needs has no influence on the caregiver. Ainsworth's student Mary Main theorised that avoidant behaviour in the Strange Situational Procedure should be regarded as 'a conditional strategy, which paradoxically permits whatever proximity is possible under conditions of maternal rejection' by de-emphasising attachment needs. Main proposed that avoidance has two functions for an infant whose caregiver is consistently unresponsive to their needs. Firstly, avoidant behaviour allows the infant to maintain a conditional proximity with the caregiver: close enough to maintain protection, but distant enough to avoid rebuff. Secondly, the cognitive processes organising avoidant behaviour could help direct attention away from the unfulfilled desire for closeness with the caregiver – avoiding a situation in which the child is overwhelmed with emotion ('disorganised distress'), and therefore unable to maintain control of themselves and achieve even conditional proximity.

=== Disorganized/disoriented attachment ===
Ainsworth herself was the first to find difficulties in fitting all infant behaviour into the three classifications used in her Baltimore study. Ainsworth and colleagues sometimes observed 'tense movements such as hunching the shoulders, putting the hands behind the neck and tensely cocking the head, and so on. It was our clear impression that such tension movements signified stress, both because they tended to occur chiefly in the separation episodes and because they tended to be prodromal to crying. Indeed, our hypothesis is that they occur when a child is attempting to control crying, for they tend to vanish if and when crying breaks through'. Such observations also appeared in the doctoral theses of Ainsworth's students. Crittenden, for example, noted that one abused infant in her doctoral sample was classed as secure (B) by her undergraduate coders because her strange situation behaviour was "without either avoidance or ambivalence, she did show stress-related stereotypic headcocking throughout the strange situation. This pervasive behaviour, however, was the only clue to the extent of her stress".

Drawing on records of behaviours discrepant with the A, B, and C classifications, a fourth classification was added by Ainsworth's colleague Mary Main and Judith Solomon. In the Strange Situation, the attachment system is expected to be activated by the departure and return of the caregiver. If the behaviour of the infant does not appear to the observer to be coordinated in a smooth way across episodes to achieve either proximity or some relative proximity with the caregiver, then it is considered 'disorganised' as it indicates a disruption or flooding of the attachment system (e.g. by fear). Infant behaviours in the Strange Situation Protocol coded as disorganised/disoriented include overt displays of fear; contradictory behaviours or affects occurring simultaneously or sequentially; stereotypic, asymmetric, misdirected or jerky movements; or freezing and apparent dissociation. Lyons-Ruth has urged, however, that it should be wider 'recognized that 52% of disorganized infants continue to approach the caregiver, seek comfort, and cease their distress without clear ambivalent or avoidant behavior.'

There is 'rapidly growing interest in disorganized attachment' from clinicians and policy-makers as well as researchers. Yet the Disorganized/disoriented attachment (D) classification has been criticised by some for being too encompassing. In 1990, Ainsworth put in print her blessing for the new 'D' classification, though she urged that the addition be regarded as 'open-ended, in the sense that subcategories may be distinguished', as she worried that the D classification might be too encompassing and might treat too many different forms of behaviour as if they were the same thing. Indeed, the D classification puts together infants who use a somewhat disrupted secure (B) strategy with those who seem hopeless and show little attachment behaviour; it also puts together infants who run to hide when they see their caregiver in the same classification as those who show an avoidant (A) strategy on the first reunion and then an ambivalent-resistant (C) strategy on the second reunion. Perhaps responding to such concerns, George and Solomon have divided among indices of Disorganized/disoriented attachment (D) in the Strange Situation, treating some of the behaviours as a 'strategy of desperation' and others as evidence that the attachment system has been flooded (e.g. by fear, or anger). Crittenden also argues that some behaviour classified as Disorganized/disoriented can be regarded as more 'emergency' versions of the avoidant and/or ambivalent/resistant strategies, and function to maintain the protective availability of the caregiver to some degree. Sroufe et al. have agreed that 'even disorganised attachment behaviour (simultaneous approach-avoidance; freezing, etc.) enables a degree of proximity in the face of a frightening or unfathomable parent'. However, 'the presumption that many indices of "disorganisation" are aspects of organised patterns does not preclude acceptance of the notion of disorganisation, especially in cases where the complexity and dangerousness of the threat are beyond children's capacity for response'. For example, 'Children placed in care, especially more than once, often have intrusions. In videos of the Strange Situation Procedure, they tend to occur when a rejected/neglected child approaches the stranger in an intrusion of desire for comfort, then loses muscular control and falls to the floor, overwhelmed by the intruding fear of the unknown, potentially dangerous, strange person'.

Main and Hesse found that most of the mothers of these children had suffered major losses or other trauma shortly before or after the birth of the infant and had reacted by becoming severely depressed. In fact, 56% of mothers who had lost a parent by death before they completed high school subsequently had children with disorganized attachments. Subsequently, studies, whilst emphasising the potential importance of unresolved loss, have qualified these findings. For example, Solomon and George found that unresolved loss in the mother tended to be associated with disorganised attachment in their infant primarily when they had also experienced an unresolved trauma in their life prior to the loss.

=== Significance of patterns ===
Research based on data from longitudinal studies, such as the National Institute of Child Health and Human Development Study of Early Child Care and the Minnesota Study of Risk and Adaption from Birth to Adulthood, and from cross-sectional studies, seeking to show associations between early attachment classifications and peer relationships typically fails to control for social background variables when seeking correlations between attachment classifications and other child behaviours, such as competence with peers. This is a general problem. Lyons-Ruth, for example, concluded that 'for each additional withdrawing behavior displayed by mothers in relation to their infant's attachment cues in the Strange Situation Procedure, the likelihood of clinical referral by service providers was increased by 50%.' But no attempt was made to assess the social background of the children who had better or worse outcomes.

Similar problems infect most longitudinal claims about secure children, for example, that they have more positive and fewer negative peer reactions and establish more and better friendships. The possibility that infants are competent in peer-groups before by nine months of age (before attachments have formed) has never been investigated in attachment research, though such competence is now proven. Few if any rigorous studies which control for social background variables of the children it compares show even weak association between early experience and a comprehensive measure of social functioning in early adulthood but, if we ignore social background, early experience may seem to predict early childhood representations of relationships, which in turn may be held to correlate with later self and relationship representations and social behaviour.

In like fashion, some studies have been claimed to show that infants with a high-risk for Autism Spectrum Disorders (ASD) may express attachment security differently from infants with a low-risk for ASD. On lie grounds, behavioural problems and social competence in insecure children may be said to increase or decline with deterioration or improvement in quality of parenting and the degree of risk in the family environment.

== Changes in attachment during childhood and adolescence ==
Childhood and adolescence allows the development of an internal working model useful for forming attachments. This internal working model is related to the individual's state of mind which develops with respect to attachment generally and explores how attachment functions in relationship dynamics based on childhood and adolescent experience. The organization of an internal working model is generally seen as leading to more stable attachments in those who develop such a model, rather than those who rely more on the individual's state of mind alone in forming new attachments.

Age, cognitive growth, and continued social experience advance the development and complexity of the internal working model. Attachment-related behaviours lose some characteristics typical of the infant-toddler period and take on age-related tendencies. The preschool period involves the use of negotiation and bargaining. For example, four-year-olds are not distressed by separation if they and their caregiver have already negotiated a shared plan for the separation and reunion.

Ideally, these social skills become incorporated into the internal working model to be used with other children and later with adult peers. As children move into the school years at about six years old, most develop a goal-corrected partnership with parents, in which each partner is willing to compromise in order to maintain a gratifying relationship. By middle childhood, the goal of the attachment behavioural system has changed from proximity to the attachment figure to availability. Generally, a child is content with longer separations, provided contact—or the possibility of physically reuniting, if needed—is available. Attachment behaviours such as clinging and following decline and self-reliance increases. By middle childhood (ages 7–11), there may be a shift toward mutual coregulation of secure-base contact in which caregiver and child negotiate methods of maintaining communication and supervision as the child moves toward a greater degree of independence.

The attachment system used by adolescents is seen as a "safety regulating system" whose main function is to promote physical and psychological safety. There are two different events that can trigger the attachment system. Those triggers include, the presence of a potential danger or stress, internal and external, and a threat of accessibility and/or availability of an attachment figure. The ultimate goal of the attachment system is security, so during a time of danger or inaccessibility the behavioural system accepts felt security in the context of the availability of protection. By adolescence we are able to find security through a variety of things, such as food, exercise, and social media. Felt security can be achieved through a number of ways, and often without the physical presence of the attachment figure. Higher levels of maturity allows adolescent teens to more capably interact with their environment on their own because the environment is perceived as less threatening. Adolescents teens will also see an increase in cognitive, emotional and behavioural maturity that dictates whether or not teens are less likely to experience conditions that activate their need for an attachment figure. For example, when teenagers get sick and stay home from school, surely they want their parents to be home so they can take care of them, but they are also able to stay home by themselves without experiencing serious amounts of distress. Additionally, the social environment that a school fosters impacts adolescents attachment behaviour, even if these same adolescents have not had issues with attachment behaviour previously. High schools that have a permissive environment compared to an authoritative environment promote positive attachment behaviour. For example, when students feel connected to their teachers and peers because of their permissive schooling environment, they are less likely to skip school. Positive-attachment behaviour in high schools have important implications on how a school's environment should be structured.

Here are the attachment style differences during adolescence:

- Secure adolescents are expected to hold their mothers at a higher rate than all other support figures, including father, significant others, and best friends.
- Insecure adolescents identify more strongly with their peers than their parents as their primary attachment figures. Their friends are seen as a significantly strong source of attachment support.
- Dismissing adolescents rate their parents as a less significant source of attachment support and would consider themselves as their primary attachment figure.
- Preoccupied adolescents would rate their parents as their primary source of attachment support and would consider themselves as a much less significant source of attachment support.

=== The dynamic-maturational model ===
Studies of older children have identified further attachment classifications. Main and Cassidy observed that disorganized behaviour in infancy can develop into a child using caregiving-controlling or punitive behaviour in order to manage a helpless or dangerously unpredictable caregiver. In these cases, the child's behaviour is organised, but the behaviour is treated by researchers as a form of 'disorganization' (D) since the hierarchy in the family is no longer organised according to parenting authority.

Patricia McKinsey Crittenden has elaborated classifications of further forms of avoidant and ambivalent attachment behaviour. These include the caregiving and punitive behaviours also identified by Main and Cassidy (termed A3 and C3 respectively), but also other patterns such as compulsive compliance with the wishes of a threatening parent (A4).

Crittenden's ideas developed from Bowlby's proposal that 'given certain adverse circumstances during childhood, the selective exclusion of information of certain sorts may be adaptive. Yet, when during adolescence and adult the situation changes, the persistent exclusion of the same forms of information may become maladaptive'.

Crittenden proposed that the basic components of human experience of danger are two kinds of information:

1. 'Affective information' – the emotions provoked by the potential for danger, such as anger or fear. Crittenden terms this 'affective information'. In childhood this information would include emotions provoked by the unexplained absence of an attachment figure. Where an infant is faced with insensitive or rejecting parenting, one strategy for maintaining the availability of their attachment figure is to try to exclude from consciousness or from expressed behaviour any emotional information that might result in rejection.
2. Causal or other sequentially ordered knowledge about the potential for safety or danger. In childhood this would include knowledge regarding the behaviours that indicate an attachment figure's availability as a secure haven. If knowledge regarding the behaviours that indicate an attachment figure's availability as a secure haven is subject to segregation, then the infant can try to keep the attention of their caregiver through clingy or aggressive behaviour, or alternating combinations of the two. Such behaviour may increase the availability of an attachment figure who otherwise displays inconsistent or misleading responses to the infant's attachment behaviours, suggesting the unreliability of protection and safety.

Crittenden proposes that both kinds of information can be split off from consciousness or behavioural expression as a 'strategy' to maintain the availability of an attachment figure: 'Type A strategies were hypothesized to be based on reducing perception of threat to reduce the disposition to respond. Type C was hypothesized to be based on heightening perception of threat to increase the disposition to respond' Type A strategies split off emotional information about feeling threatened and type C strategies split off temporally-sequenced knowledge about how and why the attachment figure is available. By contrast, type B strategies effectively use both kinds of information without much distortion. For example: a toddler may have come to depend upon a type C strategy of tantrums in working to maintain the availability of an attachment figure whose inconsistent availability has led the child to distrust or distort causal information about their apparent behaviour. This may lead their attachment figure to get a clearer grasp on their needs and the appropriate response to their attachment behaviours. Experiencing more reliable and predictable information about the availability of their attachment figure, the toddler then no longer needs to use coercive behaviours with the goal of maintaining their caregiver's availability and can develop a secure attachment to their caregiver since they trust that their needs and communications will be heeded.

== Criticism of the Strange Situation Protocol ==
Michael Rutter describes the procedure in the following terms:

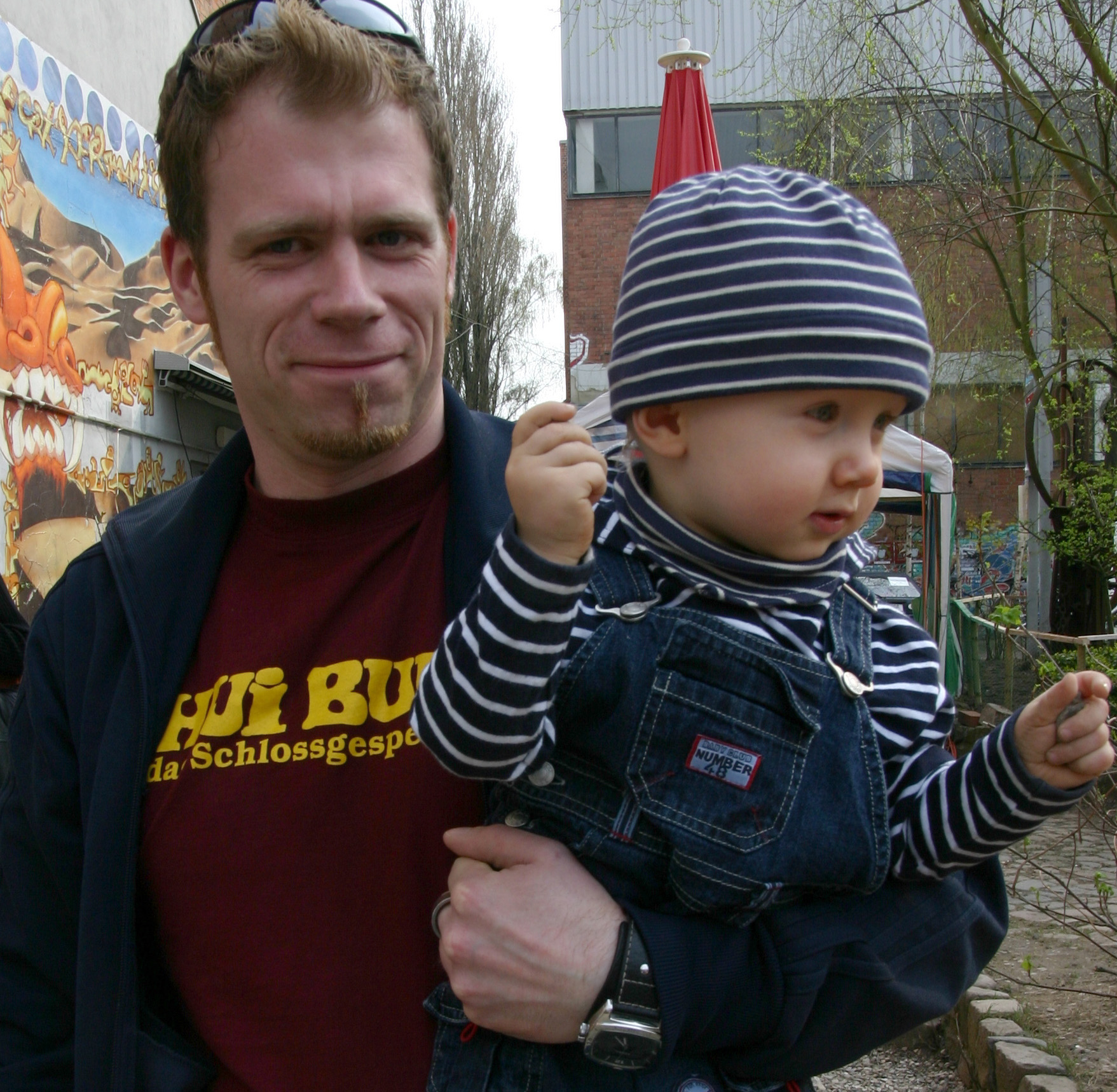
Father and child

"It is by no means free of limitations (see Lamb, Thompson, Gardener, Charnov & Estes, 1984). To begin with, it is very dependent on brief separations and reunions having the same meaning for all children. This may be a major constraint when applying the procedure in cultures, such as that in Japan (see Miyake et al., 1985), where infants are rarely separated from their mothers in ordinary circumstances. Also, because older children have a cognitive capacity to maintain relationships when the older person is not present, separation may not provide the same stress for them. Modified procedures based on the Strange Situation have been developed for older preschool children (see Belsky et al., 1994; Greenberg et al., 1990) but it is much more dubious whether the same approach can be used in middle childhood. Also, despite its manifest strengths, the procedure is based on just 20 minutes of behaviour. It can be scarcely expected to tap all the relevant qualities of a child's attachment relationships. Q-sort procedures based on much longer naturalistic observations in the home, and interviews with the mothers have developed in order to extend the data base (see Vaughn & Waters, 1990). A further constraint is that the coding procedure results in discrete categories rather than continuously distributed dimensions. Not only is this likely to provide boundary problems, but also it is not at all obvious that discrete categories best represent the concepts that are inherent in attachment security. It seems much more likely that infants vary in their degree of security and there is need for a measurement systems that can quantify individual variation".

=== Ecological validity and universality of Strange Situation attachment classification distributions ===
With respect to the ecological validity of the Strange Situation, a meta-analysis of 2,000 infant-parent dyads, including several from studies with non-Western language and/or cultural bases found the global distribution of attachment categorizations to be A (21%), B (65%), and C (14%). This global distribution was generally consistent with Ainsworth et al.'s (1978) original attachment classification distributions.

However, controversy has been raised over a few cultural differences in these rates of 'global' attachment classification distributions. In particular, two studies diverged from the global distributions of attachment classifications noted above. One study was conducted in North Germany in which more avoidant (A) infants were found than global norms would suggest, and the other in Sapporo, Japan, where more resistant (C) infants were found. Of these two studies, the Japanese findings have sparked the most controversy as to the meaning of individual differences in attachment behaviour as originally identified by Ainsworth et al. (1978).

In a recent study conducted in Sapporo, Behrens et al. (2007) found attachment distributions consistent with global norms using the six-year Main & Cassidy scoring system for attachment classification. In addition to these findings supporting the global distributions of attachment classifications in Sapporo, Behrens et al. also discuss the Japanese concept of amae and its relevance to questions concerning whether the insecure-resistant (C) style of interaction may be engendered in Japanese infants as a result of the cultural practice of amae.

A separate study was conducted in Korea, to help determine if mother-infant attachment relationships are universal or culture-specific. The results of the study of infant-mother attachment were compared to a national sample and showed that the four attachment patterns, secure, avoidance, ambivalent, and disorganized, exist in Korea as well as other varying cultures.

Van IJzendoorn and Kroonenberg conducted a meta-analysis of various countries, including Japan, Israel, Germany, China, the UK and the USA using the Strange Situation. The research showed that though there were cultural differences, the four basic patterns, secure, avoidance, ambivalent, and disorganized can be found in every culture in which studies have been undertaken, even where communal sleeping arrangements are the norm. Selection of the secure pattern is found in the majority of children across cultures studied. This follows logically from the fact that attachment theory provides for infants to adapt to changes in the environment, selecting optimal behavioural strategies. How attachment is expressed shows cultural variations which need to be ascertained before studies can be undertaken.

=== Discrete or continuous attachment measurement ===
Regarding the issue of whether the breadth of infant attachment functioning can be captured by a categorical classification scheme, continuous measures of attachment security have been developed which have demonstrated adequate psychometric properties. These have been used either individually or in conjunction with discrete attachment classifications in many published reports. The original Richter's et al. (1998) scale is strongly related to secure versus insecure classifications, correctly predicting about 90% of cases. Readers further interested in the categorical versus continuous nature of attachment classifications (and the debate surrounding this issue) should consult a paper by Fraley and Spieker and the rejoinders in the same issue by many prominent attachment researchers including J. Cassidy, A. Sroufe, E. Waters & T. Beauchaine, and M. Cummings.

== See also ==
- Affectional bond
- Attachment-based therapy (children)
- Attachment in adults
- Behavior analysis of child development
- Child psychotherapy
- The Connected Baby (documentary film)
- Human bonding
- Maternal deprivation
- Object relations theory
- John Bowlby
- Erik Erikson
- Sigmund Freud
- Jerome Kagan
- Melanie Klein
- Jean Piaget
- Donald Winnicott

== Recommended reading ==
- Cassidy, J., & Shaver, P., (Eds). (1999) Handbook of Attachment: Theory, Research, and Clinical Applications. Guilford Press, NY.
- Greenberg, MT, Cicchetti, D., & Cummings, EM., (Eds) (1990) Attachment in the Preschool Years: Theory, Research and Intervention University of Chicago, Chicago.
- Greenspan, S. (1993) Infancy and Early Childhood. Madison, CT: International Universities Press. ISBN 0-8236-2633-4.
- Holmes, J. (1993) John Bowlby and Attachment Theory. Routledge. ISBN 0-415-07730-3.
- Holmes, J. (2001) The Search for the Secure Base: Attachment Theory and Psychotherapy. London: Brunner-Routledge. ISBN 1-58391-152-9.
- Karen R (1998) Becoming Attached: First Relationships and How They Shape Our Capacity to Love. Oxford University Press. ISBN 0-19-511501-5.
- Zeanah, C., (1993) Handbook of Infant Mental Health. Guilford, NY.
- Parkes, CM, Stevenson-Hinde, J., Marris, P., (Eds.) (1991) Attachment Across The Life Cycle Routledge. NY. ISBN 0-415-05651-9
- Siegler R., DeLoache, J. & Eisenberg, N. (2003) How Children develop. New York: Worth. ISBN 1-57259-249-4.
- Bausch, Karl Heinz (2002) Treating Attachment Disorders NY: Guilford Press.
- Mercer, J. Understanding Attachment, Praeger 2005.
