= Neurological reparative therapy =

Neurological reparative therapy (NRT) is a new model of treatment synthesized from a compilation of literature and research on how to better the lives of individuals who have a wide range of mental, emotional, and behavioral disturbances – particularly children and adolescents. Although the term "neurological reparative therapy" is new, the foundation of this model is not.

NRT is not a proscriptive model, in that it does not outline how the therapy is to be conducted. A preponderance of evidence shows that the most important component of successful treatment is not the approach or techniques, but the professional caring and competence of the therapist engaging with the client in a supportive, cathartic, and healing manner. The NRT roadmap provides the best route to healthy brain development, attachment, and resiliency, but relies on the helper to use his or her own skills, experience, and techniques to take the journey.

== Principles ==
Neurological reparative therapy is not a program or a technique, but is better explained as a roadmap describing the journey of healing and repair of the mental processes preventing the individual from achieving personal goals and personal contentment. NRT outlines the goal and ultimate destination of treatment, and provides a roadmap with the mileposts along the way. NRT does not proscribe the methods, the techniques, or the approaches that are the vehicle for the client and therapist to travel the road together. NRT is specifically designed to optimize the skills and abilities of the therapist by taking advantage of the therapist's knowledge, training, and experience in joining with the clients on the healing journey. The model outlines what needs to be addressed in treatment – the therapy components critical to internal change – and points out that "knowing where you are going" is the key to arriving successfully at the destination.

== History ==
Although the term neurological reparative therapy is relatively new, the history of the model goes back many decades. NRT has its foundation in the integrated treatment of extreme mental, emotional, and behavioral disturbances in very young children. The term was first used in the writings of a psychologist, D.L. Ziegler, working with children who had experienced severe trauma and abuse. Ziegler found that integrating brain research, attachment theory, and resiliency work within trauma treatment resulted in an unexpected outcome – significant functional improvement following the cessation of treatment. This led him to the conclusion that the change was internal (i.e. neurological) in nature, and was not conditional upon a place, an individual, or the environmental circumstances. After studying years of practice-based evidence, it was found that the treatment orientation or approach of the therapist was not the determining factor in positive outcomes, but rather the integration of components of positive brain change (attachment, resiliency, and trauma treatment within the framework of how the brain functions) that frequently resulted in change "from the inside out".

== Integrated components ==
The four pillars of neurological reparative therapy are Brain Development, Attachment, Resiliency, and Trauma Treatment. The integration of all these components provides the synergy that leads to optimal positive brain change, which provides lasting change. Of these pillars, the research and literature on attachment is the oldest of the four, going back nearly a half-century. The ability of an individual to successfully bond and attach to others has been growing in importance as new information is learned about how the human body – and specifically how the brain – modulates and copes with stress. There is now a new resurgence in focusing on attachment in the treatment process of individuals, couples, and families. Resiliency research is showing it is not the negative experiences everyone encounters in life that is key, but rather the ability of the individual to cope with and bounce back from adverse situations. Resiliency is growing in importance not only in mental health settings but also in educational, occupational, and medical areas. The pillar that has seen the most influx over the last two decades has been brain development. The explosion of new information has been facilitated by sophisticated brain scanning technology, to determine in real time how the brain is processing and responding to interventions. At this point, our knowledge of the brain and how it works is doubling every ten years. NRT works to integrate new information on the brain into the healing process. While the field of trauma treatment is as old as is attachment, it takes significant advantage of the new research on brain development to better target the brain with positive change. For damaged individuals, trauma treatment is the container, while attachment, resiliency, and brain development are the included ingredients of the NRT process.

== Evidence-based vs practice-based ==
On the continuum of evidence-based practices and practice-based evidence, the neurological reparative therapy model is in the middle. Causal research has limitations when it comes to isolating variables in an intervention with integrated components. NRT allows for the use of any and all evidence-based practices as the vehicle of treatment, since it does not restrict or specify any therapeutic approach or method. NRT places the responsibility for how the therapeutic process is conducted on the therapist. Evidence-based practices should be a major consideration of all treatment.

== Research ==
Because neurological reparative therapy is an integration of an amalgam of components and a wide range of methods, the limitations of causal research make it difficult to determine if one ingredient of the process is more significant than any others. NRT primarily relies on the research and literature of the four pillars that form the conceptual foundation of the Model. There is significant literature and research concerning how the human brain functions. Additional research has been conducted on the neurobiological process of attachment. The impact of traumatic experience on the brain has abundant literature and research, as well.

The concept of resiliency is built upon a number of skills and attitudes, and has been expanded by the recent interest in psychology with respect to finding out what is right with individuals rather than what is wrong with them. The foundation of resiliency is built upon believing in yourself, having personal confidence, being able to connect in a positive way with others, and allowing others to support you. The area of resiliency has strong research support. The ability to bounce back from adversity has been found to be a key element of personal contentment.

Attachment may have the greatest amount of literature developed over the longest period of time. The early work of John Bowlby, and subsequent work of Mary Ainsworth and Mary Main, represent the foundations of attachment theory. Research has supported the link between initial attachment of the child and subsequent social success or failure throughout the developmental years and into adulthood. Attachment has been found to be a major aspect of the development of the brain related to social adjustment, mood control, drive, responsibility, and defining the personality. As the brain matures, the emotional and sensory areas of the brain develop based upon the quality of attachment. A poor attachment early in life has been associated with a wide range of problems, including poor self-regulation, poor coping, undeveloped resiliency, abnormal social and moral development, and an increased risk of psychopathology.

Trauma treatment has a significant research base as well. A classic text in the field is Traumatic Stress, the Effects of Overwhelming Experiences on the Mind, Body and Society. For a number of decades, the connection between trauma and medical problems psychological problems and psychiatric difficulties has been documented. The impact of trauma on the ability of individuals to handle stress has also been shown repeatedly.

Practice-based evidence has been collected in the outcomes research of Jasper Mountain with regard to the use of NRT in seriously traumatized young children.
