= Agee (film) =

1980 film

- Film poster
- Directed by: Ross Spears
- Written by: Ross Spears
- Produced by: Jude Cassidy; Ross Spears
- Cinematography: Anthony Forma
- Production company: James Agee Film Project
- Distributed by: First Run Features
- Release date: November 14, 1980 (New York City)
- Running time: 98 minutes
- Country: United States
- Language: English

Agee is a 1980 American documentary film about the writer and film critic James Agee directed and produced by Ross Spears. It was nominated for an Academy Award for Best Documentary Feature.

== Cast ==
- James Agee - Himself (archive footage)
- Mia Agee - Herself
- Mae Burroughs - Herself
- Jimmy Carter - Himself
- Walker Evans - Himself (voice)
- Robert Fitzgerald - Himself
- James Flye - Himself
- John Huston - Himself
- Dwight Macdonald - Himself
- Earl McCarroll - James Agee (voice)
- Alma Neuman - Herself
- Robert Saudek - Himself
- Elizabeth Tingle - Herself
- Olivia Wood - Herself

== Reception and accolades ==
Agee was well received by critics and the film community to the point of receiving a nomination for Best Documentary Feature at the 53rd Academy Awards and winning the Blue Ribbon Award at the American Film Festival.

== See also ==
- Life Itself-2014 documentary film by Steve James about Pulitzer Prize-winning film critic Roger Ebert
- Classical Hollywood cinema
- 1980 in film
