= Jude Cassidy =

American psychologist

- Education: University of Virginia
- Occupations: Professor of Psychology, University of Maryland
- Awards: APA Boyd McCandless Award

Jude Anne Cassidy is Professor of Psychology and Distinguished Scholar-Teacher at the University of Maryland. Cassidy was awarded the American Psychological Association Boyd McCandless Young Scientist Award in 1991 for her early career contributions to Developmental Psychology. She is a Fellow of the American Psychological Association, Division 7 (Developmental Psychology) and the Association for Psychological Science.

Cassidy co-edited the Handbook of Attachment: Theory, Research, and Clinical Implications with Phillip Shaver. She is the author of two monographs on attachment theory published by the Society for Research in Child Development. One of these monographs, Security in infancy, childhood, and adulthood: A move to the level of representation, cited 6229 times according to GoogleScholar, provided new insight into individual differences in parent-infant attachment relations as assessed through the Strange Situation. Cassidy currently serves as co-editor of the journal Attachment and Human Development.

== Biography ==
Cassidy received a B.A. in English (magna cum laude) from Duke University. She subsequently attended New York University where she obtained an M.F.A. Cassidy then pursued graduate studies in Developmental Psychology at the University of Virginia where she completed her Ph.D. under the supervision of Mary Ainsworth in 1986.

Cassidy joined the faculty of Psychology at Pennsylvania State University in 1988 where she remained until 1996. She moved to the University of Maryland in 1996 and was promoted to Full Professor in 1999. Her research has been funded by the National Institute of Mental Health, the National Institute of Child Health and Human Development, and the National Institute on Drug Abuse.

Cassidy delivered the John Bowlby Memorial Lecture in 2010.

== Research ==
Cassidy's research program focuses on attachment, family relationships, and social and emotional development in children and adolescents. Her work expanded the attachment behavioral system developed by John Bowlby, which described internal working models as organized frameworks for understanding the world, developed by infants through experience with their caregivers. Cassidy's work linked secure attachment patterns in infancy with the development of empathy and altruism, school readiness, and successful peer relationships, and insecure patterns of attachment with child psychopathology. Cassidy's work with Mary Main led to the identification of disorganized attachment, the fourth category of attachment styles in the Strange Situation. In this rare form of attachment, children will react inconsistently and often in a confused manner when presented with toys, strangers, and the separation and reunion with the mom. Cassidy, along Mary Main and George Kaplan, found that a parent's “state of mind with respect to attachment” was predictive of his or her infant's pattern of attachment, which suggested intergenerational transmission of attachment patterns. Her research on attachment theory has important clinical applications for understanding addiction and for developing educational efforts to foster secure parent-child relationships.

== Representative Publications ==
- Cassidy, J. (1988). Child-mother attachment and the self in six-year-olds. Child Development, 59(1), 121–134.
- Cassidy, J. (1994). Emotion regulation: Influences of attachment relationships. Monographs of the Society for Research in Child Development, 59(2‐3), 228–249.
- Cassidy, J., & Asher, S. R. (1992). Loneliness and peer relations in young children. Child Development, 63(2), 350–365.
- Cassidy, J., & Berlin, L. J. (1994). The insecure/ambivalent pattern of attachment: Theory and research. Child Development, 65(4), 971–991.
- Main, M., & Cassidy, J. (1988). Categories of response to reunion with the parent at age 6: Predictable from infant attachment classifications and stable over a 1-month period. Developmental Psychology, 24(3), 415–426.
- Main, M., Kaplan, N., & Cassidy, J. (1985). Security in infancy, childhood, and adulthood: A move to the level of representation. Monographs of the Society for Research in Child Development, 50(1/2), 66–104.
