= Secure attachment =

Attachment style within attachment theory

Secure attachment is classified by children who show some distress when their caregiver leaves but are able to compose themselves quickly when the caregiver returns. Children with secure attachment feel protected by their caregivers, and they know that they can depend on them to return. A securely attached child can use their parent as a safe base to explore their surroundings and is easily comforted after being separated or when feeling stressed.

Secure attachment is an under-explored topic beyond infancy, however some research indicates that attachment security continues to influence relationships, emotional regulation, and psychological well-being throughout adulthood.

Infants are born with natural behaviors that help them survive. Attachment behavior allows an infant to draw people near them when they are in need of help or are in distress. Humans' instinct for attachment is a basic adaptation for survival that most mammals share, and when infants and adults feel stresses or are under alert, their attachment system is alerted. Attachment is a specific and focused aspect of the child-caregiver relationship that plays a key role in ensuring the child's sense of safety, security, and protection. It refers to the way a child relies on their primary caregiver as a secure base for exploring the world and, when needed, as a safe haven and source of comfort.

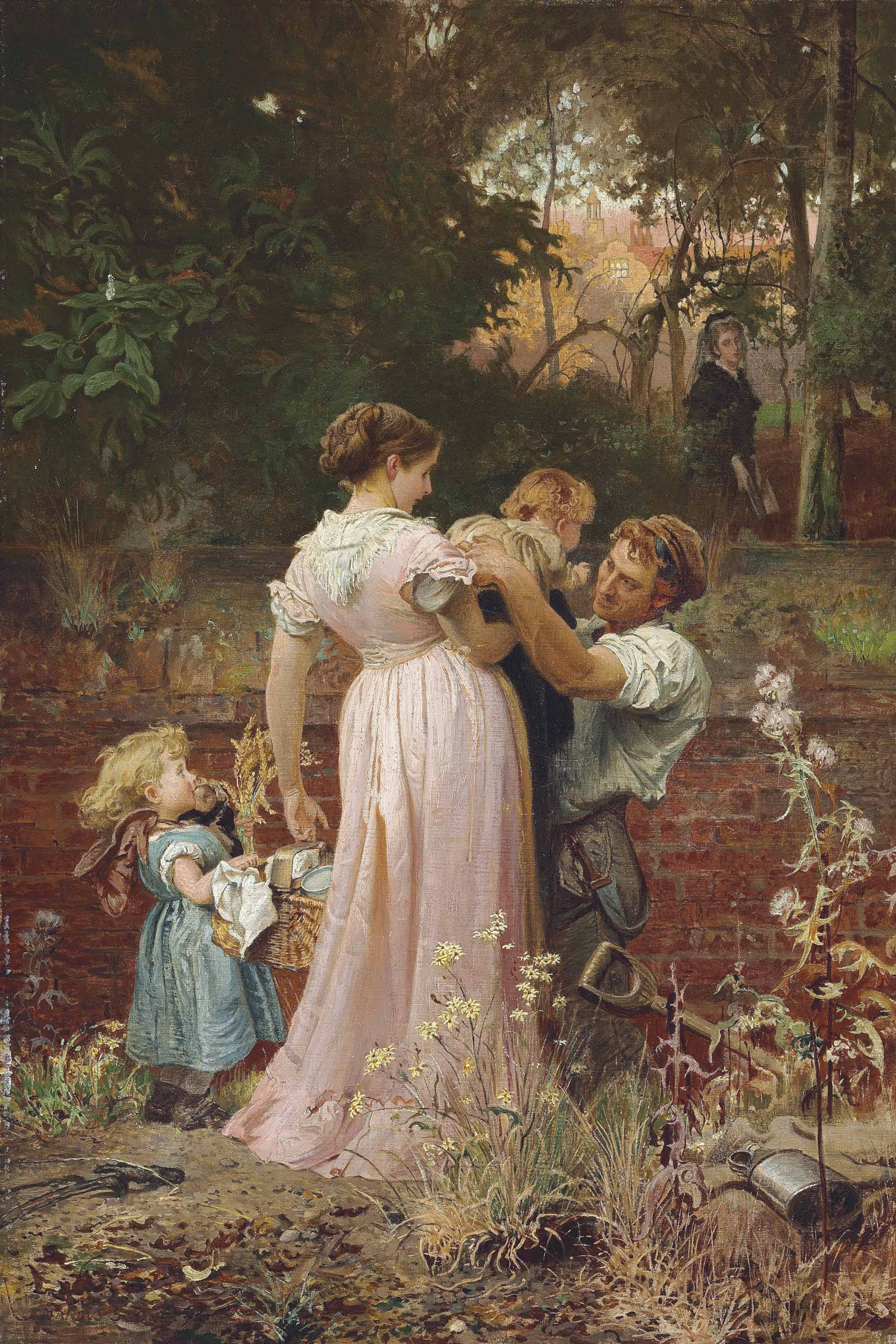
Painting by Marcus Stone of children in a close relationship with both parents

John Bowlby and Mary Ainsworth developed a theory known as attachment theory after inadvertently studying children who were patients in a hospital at which they were working. John Bowlby aimed to understand the deep distress infants experience when separated from their parents. He noticed that these infants would make great efforts—such as crying, clinging, and searching—to avoid being separated or to get close to a parent who was missing. Attachment theory explains how the parent-child relationship emerges and provides influence on subsequent behaviors and relationships. Stemming from this theory, there are four main types of attachment: secure attachment, ambivalent attachment, avoidant attachment and disorganized attachment.

== The four attachment types ==
- Ambivalent attachment is defined by children who become very distressed when their caregiver leaves, and they are not able to soothe or compose themselves. These children cannot depend on their caregiver(s) to be there for them. This is a relatively infrequent case with only a small percentage of children in the United States affected.
- Avoidant attachment is represented by children who avoid their caregiver, showing no distress when the caregiver leaves. These children react similarly to a stranger as do they with their caregiver. This attachment is often associated with abusive situations. Children who are reprimanded for going to their caregiver will stop seeking help in the future.
- Disorganized attachment is defined by children who have no consistent way to manage their separation from and reunion with the attachment figure. This is the most severe form of insecure attachment, often resulting from traumatic experiences like neglect or psychological, physical, or sexual abuse, and may also be linked to neurodevelopmental vulnerabilities in the child. Sometimes these children appear to be clinically depressed. These children are often present in studies of high-risk samples of severely maltreated babies, but they also appear in other samples.
- Secure attachment might lead the child to grow up having higher self-esteem as well as better self-reliance. Additionally, these children tend to be more independent and have lower reported instances of anxiety and depression. These children are also able to form better social relationships.

== Characteristics ==
=== Characteristics of securely attached children ===
Children who are securely attached typically are visibly upset as their caregivers leave, but they are happy upon their return. These children seek comfort from their parent or caregiver when frightened. In an instance when their parent or primary caregiver is not available, these children can be comforted to a degree by others, but they prefer their familiar parent or caregiver. Likewise, when parents with secure attachments reach out to their children, the children welcome the connection. Playing with children is more common when parents and children have a secure attachment. These parents react more quickly to their children's needs and are typically more responsive to a child they are securely attached to than one of insecure attachment. Attachment carries on throughout the growth of the children. Studies support that secure attachments with primary caregivers lead to more mature and less aggressive children than those with avoidant or ambivalent attachment styles.

The relationship type infants establish with their primary caregiver can predict the course of their relationships and connections throughout their lives. Children begin to perceive the parenting that they receive as early as 12 months old. Therefore, to create a supportive and secure relationship between parent and child, it is important for parents to be mindful of their actions even in the early ages of their child's life. Children who are securely attached tend to be more empathetic and responsive to others needs as a result of their own parents mirroring that to them. Those who are securely attached have high self-esteem, seek out social connection and support and are able to share their feelings with other people. They also tend to have long-term, trusting relationships. Secure attachment has been shown to act as a buffer to determinants of health among preschoolers, including stress and poverty. One study supports that women with a secure attachment style had more positive feelings with regard to their adult relationships than women with insecure attachment styles. Within an adult romantic relationship, secure attachment can mean both people engage in close, bodily contact, disclose information with one another, share discoveries with each other and feel safe when the other is nearby.

=== Characteristics in parents of securely attached children ===
Co-parenting behaviors can effect the ability of a child to form secure attachment. Supportive collaborative parenting styles were found to foster secure attachment in children not only with their parents but also their peers. Supportive collaborative parenting was found when maternal and paternal behaviors and attitude were united and consisted with each other.

There are believed to be two components of secure attachment theory, one of those being a secure base. A secure base must give enough room to explore while still offering a safe haven to return to in distress with a strong attachment figure being the "secure base" in which a child will feel comfortable returning to. The second component of the secure attachment theory are internal working models. IWMs are the cognitive mental structures or schemas that determine how a child perceives the parenting they perceive. IWMs are important because as a child grows older, they tend to rely on IWMs rather than an actual parental figure to guide them. Children begin to perceive the parenting they revise as early as 12 months old. Securely attached children often develop IWMs of available care. Characteristics of parents who have secure attachment should create a feeling of closeness and supportiveness to support both the secure base theory and the IWM theory.

When focusing on how to promote secure attachment, it is important for parents to consider what may lead to other more negative forms of attachment. For example, anxious attachment in children was found to be the result of over-autonomy practices over their children. Avoidant attachment in children was found to be the result of parents restricting children's autonomy.

== Secure attachment beyond childhood ==
Primary research focuses secure attachment on the relationship between caregiver and child, but additional findings have determined that attachment continues to impact relationships into adulthood. Those with secure attachment has a sense of safety in their connections, having the ability to provide and receive support from others. When faced with conflict, those with secure attachment style are able to handle it with clear communication, processing their emotions in a grounded way while maintaining an openness for their partner's feelings as well. Securely attached people are associated with being able to regulate their emotions in a healthy and effective way, contributing to overall relationship wellbeing.

== Stability and change in secure attachment ==
Research indicates that the established secure attachment that begins in childhood can shift through adulthood. Emotional, psychological, and social experiences through life begin to influence whether attachment remains the same or changes over time. Cognitive development also plays an important role in those changes, as cognitive capacity develops from infancy into adolescence, these changes impact how attachment patterns form and evolve. Changes in attachment go beyond developmental changes that a child may go through. Children, who did not develop a secure attachment but go on to develop it in adulthood is known as Earned Secure Attachment. According to current research this can take place in various ways, including identifying the root causes (i.e. mental health) and building healthier attachments through close and supportive relationships.

== Research ==
=== The strange situation ===
The "strange situation" was an experimental procedure developed by Ainsworth to study the variety of attachment forms between one- to two-year-olds and their mothers. Mothers at the time were their primary caregivers. The sample was made up of 100 middle class American families. There was a room set up with one-way glass allowing the researcher to observe the interaction. Inside the room, there were some toys and a confederate, fulfilling the role of stranger. The Strange Situation had eight episodes lasting three minutes each. The behavior of the infant was observed during each phase. The mother, baby and experimenter were all together initially. This phase lasted less than one minute. Then the mother and baby were alone in the room. A stranger, confederate, joined the mother and infant. After a set time had passed, the mother would leave the room, leaving her child with the stranger. The children with a secure attachment to their mother would cry for a few minutes but were able to compose themselves and play with the toys. Once the mother returned, the children with secure attachments greeted them and returned to play. Sometimes, they would show their mothers the toys with which they had played. As the mother returned, the stranger left. Then the mother left and the infant was left alone. The stranger returned. Lastly, the mother returned and the stranger left. This strange situation became the basis of the attachment theory.

=== Wire mother vs cloth mother study ===
More research was performed by Harry Harlow with monkeys. He utilized the strange situation to see if a monkey would go to a cloth mother or a mother that offers food to the baby. The baby monkey would choose to snuggle up to the cloth mother and felt secure. If the experiment was performed again without the cloth mother then the baby monkey would freeze up, scream, and cry. This study shows a secure attachment to something that is soft and comforting. Babies can feel the same way with blankets or stuffed animals.

== Criticisms ==
J.R. Harris is one of the main critics of attachment theory. She suggests that people assume that honest and respectful parents will have honest and respectful children, et cetera. However, this may not be the case. Harris argues that children's peers have more influence on one's personality than their parents. The common example used is a child with immigrant parents. The children are able to continue to speak their parent's original language whilst at home, but the children can also learn the new language and speak it without an accent, while the parents' accent remains. Harris claims that children learn these things from their peers in an attempt to fit in with others. In the nature versus nurture debate within secure attachment, Harris takes a nature stance. She supports herself by stating that identical twins separated at birth showed more similarities in their hobbies and interests than twins raised in the same household.

Aside from the nature argument, there are three additional criticisms. it is assessed during momentary separations. Since these brief situations can be stressful, this is a limitation in the theory. A better demonstration of the child's reaction might have come from a situation in which the mother left, but the child did not experience excessive stress. Another limitation with the attachment model is the assumption that the mother is the primary attachment figure. Attachment can be expressed differently with each figure. For example, children may cry when one figure leaves while they might have trouble sleeping when another leaves. Additionally, physiological changes can occur during this situation, and they were not accounted for.
