= Mind-mindedness =

Mind-mindedness is a concept in developmental psychology. It refers to a caregiver's tendency to view their child as an individual with a mind, rather than merely an entity with needs that must be satisfied. Mind-mindedness involves adopting the intentional stance towards another person. Individual differences in mind-mindedness have been observed in the first year of life, and have been observed to have important developmental consequences.

== History ==
The termed was coined by the psychologists Elizabeth Meins and Charles Fernyhough as part of a rethinking of the concept of maternal sensitivity.

Research findings on mind-mindedness have been proposed to have implications for parenting practices.
