= Strange situation =

Concept in psychology related to attachment

The strange situation is a procedure devised by Mary Ainsworth in the 1970s to observe attachment in children, that is relationships between a caregiver and child. It applies to children between the ages of 9 and 30 months. Broadly speaking, the attachment styles were (1) secure and (2) insecure (ambivalent and avoidance). Later, Mary Main and her husband Erik Hesse introduced the 4th category, disorganized. The procedure played an important role in the development of attachment theory.

== Structured observation ==
In the Strange Situation procedure, the child is observed playing for 21 minutes while caregivers and strangers enter and leave the room, recreating the flow of the familiar and unfamiliar presence in most children's lives. The situation varies in stressfulness and the child's responses are observed. The child experiences the following situations:

- Parent and infant are introduced to the experimental room.
- Parent and infant are alone. The parent does not participate while the infant explores.
- Stranger enters, converses with the parent, then approaches infant. Parent leaves conspicuously.
- First separation episode: Stranger's behavior is geared to that of the infant.
- First reunion episode: Parent greets and comforts infant, then leaves again.
- Second separation episode: Infant is alone.
- Continuation of second separation episode: Stranger enters and gears behavior to that of the infant.
- Second reunion episode: Parent enters, greets infant, and picks up the infant; stranger leaves conspicuously.

Four aspects of the child's behavior are observed:

- The amount of exploration (e.g. playing with new toys) the child engages in throughout.
- The child's reactions to the departure of its caregiver.
- The stranger anxiety (when the baby is alone with the stranger).
- The child's reunion behavior with its caregiver.

On the basis of their behaviors, the children were categorized into three groups. When interpreted by an expert with the proper training, each of these groups is said to reflect a different kind of attachment relationship with the caregiver.

Building on this foundation, Main and Solomon (1990) extended the original attachment classification to identify a fourth disorganized/disoriented attachment style. They observed infants displaying contradictory or confused behaviors when reunited with a caregiver. This complicated the understanding of attachment patterning and has informed clinical practice and developmental research.

== Four patterns of attachment ==
=== 1. Secure (B) ===
A child who is securely attached to its parent will explore and play freely while the caregiver is present, using them as a "secure base" from which to explore. The child will engage with the stranger when the caregiver is present, and may be visibly upset when the caregiver departs but happy to see the caregiver on their return. The child feels confident that the caregiver is available, and will be responsive to their attachment needs and communications.

In the traditional Ainsworth et al. (1978) coding of the strange situation, secure infants are denoted as "Group B" infants and they are further subclassified as B1, B2, B3, and B4. Although these subgroupings refer to different stylistic responses to the comings and goings of the caregiver, they were not given specific labels by Ainsworth and colleagues, although their descriptive behaviours led others (including students of Ainsworth) to devise a relatively "loose" terminology for these subgroups. B1s have been referred to as "secure-reserved", B2s as "secure-inhibited", B3s as "secure-balanced", and B4s as "secure-reactive". However, in academic publications the classification of infants (if subgroups are denoted) is typically simply "B1" or "B2", although more theoretical and review-oriented papers surrounding attachment theory may use the above terminology. Secure attachment is the most common type of attachment relationship seen throughout societies.

Securely attached children are best able to explore when they have the knowledge of a secure base to return to in times of need. When assistance is given, this bolsters the sense of security and also, assuming the caregiver's assistance is helpful, educates the child in how to cope with the same problem in the future. Therefore, secure attachment can be seen as the most adaptive attachment style for learning and making use of resources in a non-threatening environment. According to attachment researchers, a child becomes securely attached when the caregiver is available and able to meet the needs of the child in a responsive and appropriate manner. Others have pointed out that there are also other determinants of the child's attachment, and that the behavior of the parent may in turn be influenced by the child's behavior.

=== 2. Anxious-avoidant, insecure (A) ===
A child with the anxious-avoidant insecure attachment pattern will avoid or ignore the caregiver, showing little emotion when the caregiver departs or returns. The child will not explore very much regardless of who is there. Infants classified as anxious-avoidant (A) represented a puzzle in the early 1980s. They did not exhibit distress on separation, and either ignored the caregiver on their return (A1 subtype) or showed some tendency to approach together with some tendency to ignore or turn away from the caregiver (A2 subtype). Ainsworth and Bell theorised that the apparently unruffled behaviour of the avoidant infants is in fact a mask for distress, a hypothesis later evidenced through studies of the heart rate of avoidant infants.

Infants are depicted as dismissive or avoidant when there is:

... conspicuous avoidance of the mother in the reunion episodes which is likely to consist of ignoring her altogether, although there may be some pointed looking away, turning away, or moving away ... If there is a greeting when the mother enters, it tends to be a mere look or a smile ... Either the baby does not approach his mother upon reunion, or they approach in "abortive" fashions with the baby going past the mother, or it tends to only occur after much coaxing ... If picked up, the baby shows little or no contact-maintaining behavior; he tends not to cuddle in; he looks away and he may squirm to get down.

Ainsworth's narrative records showed that infants avoided the caregiver in the stressful Strange Situation Procedure when they had a history of experiencing rebuff of attachment behaviour. The infant's needs were frequently not met and the infant had come to believe that communication of emotional needs had no influence on the caregiver.

Ainsworth's student Mary Main theorized that avoidant behaviour in the Strange Situation Procedure should be regarded as "a conditional strategy, which paradoxically permits whatever proximity is possible under conditions of maternal rejection" by de-emphasising attachment needs.

Main proposed that avoidance has two functions for an infant whose caregiver is consistently unresponsive to their needs. Firstly, avoidant behaviour allows the infant to maintain a conditional proximity with the caregiver: close enough to maintain protection, but distant enough to avoid rebuff. Secondly, the cognitive processes organizing avoidant behaviour could help direct attention away from the unfulfilled desire for closeness with the caregiver who is avoiding a situation in which the child is overwhelmed with emotion ("disorganized distress"), and therefore unable to maintain control of themselves and achieve even conditional proximity.

=== 3. Anxious-ambivalent/resistant, insecure (C) ===
Children classified as Anxious-Ambivalent/Resistant (C) showed distress even before separation, and were clingy and difficult to comfort on the caregiver's return. They showed either signs of resentment in response to the absence (C1 subtype), or signs of helpless passivity (C2 subtype). Hans et al. have expressed concern that "ambivalent attachment remains the most poorly understood of Ainsworth's attachment types". In particular, the relationship between ambivalent/resistant (C) and disorganisation (D) is still to be clarified. However, researchers agree that the Anxious-Ambivalent/Resistant strategy is a response to unpredictably responsive caregiving, and that the displays of anger or helplessness towards the caregiver on reunion can be regarded as a conditional strategy for maintaining the availability of the caregiver by preemptively taking control of the interaction.

The C1 (ambivalent resistant) subtype is coded when "resistant behavior is particularly conspicuous. The mixture of seeking and yet resisting contact and interaction has an unmistakably angry quality and indeed an angry tone may characterize behavior in the preseparation episodes".

Regarding the C2 (ambivalent passive) subtype, Ainsworth et al. wrote:

Perhaps the most conspicuous characteristic of C2 infants is their passivity. Their exploratory behavior is limited throughout the strange situation, and their interactive behaviors are relatively lacking in active initiation. Nevertheless in the reunion episodes they obviously want proximity to and contact with their mothers, even though they tend to use signaling behavior rather than active approach, and protest against being put down rather than actively resist release. ... [I]n general the C2 baby is not as conspicuously angry as the C1 baby.

Research done by McCarthy and Taylor (1999) found that children with abusive childhood experiences were more likely to develop ambivalent attachments. The study also found that children with ambivalent attachments were more likely to experience difficulties in maintaining intimate relationships as adults.

=== 4. Disorganized/disoriented (D) ===
Ainsworth herself was the first to find difficulties in fitting all infant behavior into the three classifications used in her Baltimore study. Ainsworth and colleagues sometimes observed

tense movements such as hunching the shoulders, putting the hands behind the neck and tensely cocking the head, and so on. It was our clear impression that such tension movements signified stress, both because they tended to occur chiefly in the separation episodes and because they tended to be prodromal to crying. Indeed, our hypothesis is that they occur when a child is attempting to control crying, for they tend to vanish if and when crying breaks through.

Such observations also appeared in the doctoral theses of Ainsworth's students. Patricia Crittenden, for example, noted that one abused infant in her doctoral sample was classed as secure (B) by her undergraduate coders because her strange situation behavior was "without either avoidance or ambivalence, she did show stress-related stereotypic headcocking throughout the strange situation. This pervasive behavior, however, was the only clue to the extent of her stress."

Drawing on records of behaviors discrepant with the A, B and C classifications, a fourth classification was added by Ainsworth's graduate student Mary Main. In the Strange Situation, the attachment system is expected to be activated by the departure and return of the caregiver. If the behaviour of the infant does not appear to the observer to be coordinated in a smooth way across episodes to achieve either proximity or some relative proximity with the caregiver, then it is considered "disorganised" as it indicates a disruption or flooding of the attachment system (e.g. by fear). Infant behaviours in the Strange Situation Protocol coded as disorganised/disoriented include overt displays of fear; contradictory behaviours or affects occurring simultaneously or sequentially; stereotypic, asymmetric, misdirected or jerky movements; or freezing and apparent dissociation. However, despite initial symptoms of disorganized/disoriented behaviors, Lyons-Ruth widely "recognized that 52% of disorganized infants continue to approach the caregiver, seek comfort, and cease their distress without clear ambivalent or avoidant behavior."

There is "rapidly growing interest in disorganized attachment" from clinicians and policy-makers as well as researchers. Yet the Disorganized/disoriented attachment (D) classification has been criticised by some for being too encompassing. In 1990, Ainsworth put in print her blessing for the new "D" classification, though she urged that the addition be regarded as "open-ended, in the sense that subcategories may be distinguished", as she worried that the D classification might be too encompassing and might treat too many different forms of behaviour as if they were the same thing. Indeed, the D classification puts together infants who use a somewhat disrupted secure (B) strategy with those who seem hopeless and show little attachment behaviour; it also puts together infants who run to hide when they see their caregiver in the same classification as those who show an avoidant (A) strategy on the first reunion and then an ambivalent-resistant (C) strategy on the second reunion. Perhaps responding to such concerns, George and Solomon have divided among indices of Disorganized/disoriented attachment (D) in the Strange Situation, treating some of the behaviours as a "strategy of desperation" and others as evidence that the attachment system has been flooded (e.g. by fear, or anger). Crittenden also argues that some behaviour classified as Disorganized/disoriented can be regarded as more 'emergency' versions of the avoidant and/or ambivalent/resistant strategies, and function to maintain the protective availability of the caregiver to some degree. Sroufe et al. have agreed that 'even disorganised attachment behaviour (simultaneous approach-avoidance; freezing, etc.) enables a degree of proximity in the face of a frightening or unfathomable parent'. However, Crittenden points out that 'the presumption that many indices of "disorganization" are aspects of organized patterns does not preclude acceptance of the notion of disorganization, especially in cases where the complexity and dangerousness of the threat are beyond children's capacity for response'.

Main and Hesse found that most of the mothers of these children had suffered major losses or other trauma shortly before or after the birth of the infant and had reacted by becoming severely depressed. In fact, 56% of mothers who had lost a parent by death before they completed high school subsequently had children with disorganized attachments. Subsequently, studies, whilst emphasising the potential importance of unresolved loss, have qualified these findings. For example, Solomon and George found that unresolved loss in the mother tended to be associated with disorganised attachment in their infant primarily when they had also experienced an unresolved trauma in their life prior to the loss.

== Critique of the strange situation protocol ==
Michael Rutter describes the procedure in the following terms:

It is by no means free of limitations (see Lamb, Thompson, Gardener, Charnov & Estes, 1984). To begin with, it is very dependent on brief separations and reunions having the same meaning for all children. This may be a major constraint when applying the procedure in cultures, such as that in Japan (see Miyake et al., 1985), where infants are rarely separated from their mothers in ordinary circumstances. Also, because older children have a cognitive capacity to maintain relationships when the older person is not present, separation may not provide the same stress for them. Modified procedures based on the Strange Situation have been developed for older preschool children (see Belsky et al., 1994; Greenberg et al., 1990) but it is much more dubious whether the same approach can be used in middle childhood. Also, despite its manifest strengths, the procedure is based on just 20 minutes of behavior. It can be scarcely expected to tap all the relevant qualities of a child's attachment relationships. Q-sort procedures based on much longer naturalistic observations in the home, and interviews with the mothers have developed in order to extend the data base (see Vaughn & Waters, 1990). A further constraint is that the coding procedure results in discrete categories rather than continuously distributed dimensions. Not only is this likely to provide boundary problems, but also it is not at all obvious that discrete categories best represent the concepts that are inherent in attachment security. It seems much more likely that infants vary in their degree of security and there is need for a measurement system that can quantify individual variation.

Other researchers as well have raised concerns about the strange situation's construct validity and questioned its terminology as a "gold standard" measure of attachment.

=== Ecological validity and universality ===
With respect to the ecological validity of the Strange Situation, a meta-analysis of 2,000 infant-parent dyads, including several from studies with non-Western language and/or cultural bases found the global distribution of attachment categorizations to be A (21%), B (65%), and C (14%) This global distribution was generally consistent with Ainsworth et al.'s (1978) original attachment classification distributions.

However, controversy has been raised over a few cultural differences in these rates of "global" attachment classification distributions. In particular, two studies diverged from the global distributions of attachment classifications noted above. One study was conducted in North Germany in which more avoidant (A) infants were found than global norms would suggest, and the other in Sapporo, Japan where more resistant (C) infants were found. Of these two studies, the Japanese findings have sparked the most controversy as to the meaning of individual differences in attachment behavior as originally identified by Ainsworth et al. (1978).

In a study conducted in Sapporo, Behrens et al. (2007) found attachment distributions consistent with global norms using the six-year Main & Cassidy scoring system for attachment classification. In addition to these findings supporting the global distributions of attachment classifications in Sapporo, Behrens et al. also discuss the Japanese concept of amae and its relevance to questions concerning whether the insecure-resistant (C) style of interaction may be engendered in Japanese infants as a result of the cultural practice of amae.

=== Attachment measurement ===
Regarding the issue of whether the breadth of infant attachment functioning can be captured by a categorical classification scheme, continuous measures of attachment security have been developed which have demonstrated adequate psychometric properties. These have been used either individually or in conjunction with discrete attachment classifications in many published reports [see Richters et al., 1998; Van IJzendoorn et al., 1990).] The original Richter's et al. (1998) scale is strongly related to secure versus insecure classifications, correctly predicting about 90% of cases. Readers further interested in the categorical versus continuous nature of attachment classifications (and the debate surrounding this issue) should consult the paper by Fraley and Spieker and the rejoinders in the same issue by many prominent attachment researchers including J. Cassidy, A. Sroufe, E. Waters & T. Beauchaine, and M. Cummings.

== See also ==
- Attachment in children
- Reactive attachment disorder
- Visual cliff
- Attachment measures
