= Mary Main =

American psychologist (1943–2023)

Mary Main (February 7, 1943 – January 6, 2023) was an American psychologist notable for her work in the field of attachment. A professor at the University of California Berkeley, Main is particularly known for her introduction of the 'disorganized' infant attachment classification and for development of the Adult Attachment Interview and coding system for assessing states of mind regarding attachment. This work has been described as 'revolutionary' and Main has been described as having 'unprecedented resonance and influence' in the field of psychology.

== Early work ==
John Bowlby originally proposed the concept of the 'attachment behavioral system', an orientation and set of dispositions which evolved because it provided protection from predation and other risks to survival. The system has three components in early childhood: the monitoring and maintaining of proximity to an attachment figure or figures, flight to these individuals as a haven of safety in times of alarm, and use of these individuals as a secure base for exploration. A collaborator of Bowlby's, Mary Ainsworth, developed a standardised laboratory observation procedure named the 'Strange Situation' in which an infant would undergo two brief separations and reunions from their caregiver as well as contact with a stranger.

In its novelty and its separations, the Strange Situation confronted the infant with two natural cues for danger, and allowed observers to see the articulation and balance between the infant's capacities to explore, affiliate with the stranger, and seek and find comfort from their caregiver. Individual differences in infant responses to the situation were found and three patterns were identified: secure, insecure-avoidant, and insecure-ambivalent.

Mary Main was among the first doctoral students of Mary Ainsworth's at The Johns Hopkins University in Baltimore, exploring the relationship between attachment and infant play in her doctoral research. Main found that infants who were securely attached to their mothers engaged in more exploration and interactive play. Important aspects of Main's early work also included microanalysis of infant-mother interaction using descriptive language rather than count data, replicating her teacher Mary Ainsworth's Strange Situation on a different sample, and work on the scale for avoidant infant behavior.

Insecure-avoidance is coded using a 1–7 scale for 'avoidance', which Mary Ainsworth and Mary Main worked on together. Whereas infants classified as secure would seek their caregiver on reunion, show their distress, and receive comfort, 'avoidance' was a measure of the extent to which an infant kept their attention away from their caregiver and avoided showing their distress. Main conceptualised avoidance as a 'conditional behavioral strategy'. Whilst it might seem odd or maladaptive at first sight for a child to turn away from their caregiver when anxious, Main argued from an evolutionary perspective that avoidance could be regarded as a strategy to achieve the protective proximity enjoined by the attachment system - but which responds to the context of a caregiver who would rebuff them and be less available if the infant made a direct appeal for contact and comfort.

Following completion of her dissertation, Main took up a faculty position in the Department of Psychology at the University of California, Berkeley. She has since remained at Berkeley, though she has also held visiting scholar positions at the Centre for Interdisciplinary Research in Bielefeld (Germany) and the University of Leiden (Netherlands). During her year with Karin and Klaus Grossmann at the Centre for Interdisciplinary Research in 1977, Main interacted with various biologists, evolutionary theorists and ethologists, including Richard Dawkins and Robert Hinde, who influenced her thinking about conflict behaviors. She also helped Karin and Klaus Grossman with their Bielefeld longitudinal study, including encouraging them to analyse the role of fathers in infants' attachment development.

In a letter to Behavioral and Brain Science, 1977, the ground in evolutionary theory upon which Main's later ideas emerged is already clear. In this text, she draws from Tinbergen the important distinction between 'proximal' and 'ultimate' causation, noting that immense confusion about attachment arises when these levels of analysis are mistaken for one another. In inquiring about the proximate cause of behavior, an attachment researcher may ask "What made him show attachment behavior toward it at this particular moment?" In inquiring about the ultimate cause of behavior, an attachment researcher may ask "What is attachment behavior good for – how does it affect survival and reproduction?" In her attention to attachment as an evolutionary phenomenon, from early in her career Main was already reflecting that a conflict might arise between an infant's experience of aversive parenting and the attachment injunction to seek protection from a caregiver:

Peculiar maltreatment effects – that is, the irrational return of the abused to the abusing object – were first noted by Darwin (1972) in his voyage to the Galapagos; they were presented along with an explanation of the mechanism. He physically assaulted a Galapagos sea-lizard, as he stood on a promontory, and each time tossed it seaward. Although "possessed of perfect powers to swim away" from him, it returned each time to the point on which he stood. "Perhaps this singular piece of apparent stupidity may be accounted for by the circumstance that this reptile has no enemy whatever on shore, whereas at sea it must often fall prey to the numerous sharks. Hence, probably, urged by a fixed and hereditary instinct that the shore is its place of safety, whatever the emergency may be, it there takes refuge". This is an "ultimate" account made sheerly at the level of mechanism, and it is essentially identical to Bowlby's. Severely maltreating mothers cannot be common in any species, and perhaps this account of "maltreatment effects" on the proximate level is sufficient. On the other hand, it is at least conceivable that some biologically-based strategy has been developed to deal with maltreating mothers."

== Disorganized attachment ==
In 1986 Mary Main, together with Judith Solomon, introduced a new infant attachment classification, 'disorganized/disoriented' (D), for the Ainsworth Strange Situation procedure based on a review of discrepant infant behaviors in the Strange Situation. This review included consideration of tapes of Strange Situations from various research groups including the Grossmanns, Mary J. O’Connor, Elizabeth Carlson, Leila Beckwith and Susan Spieker.

Michael Rutter, a prominent commentator on attachment research, has described the discovery of the disorganized/disoriented attachment classification as one of the five great advances to the field of psychology contributed by research in attachment.

In general, disorganized behaviors occur only briefly, before the infant then enters back into one of the Ainsworth A, B or C attachment patterns. As such, infants coded as disorganized/disoriented are also given a secondary A, B or C classification. The discrepant behaviors are most often exhibited on reunion, but are found in other episodes of the procedure as well.

Main and Solomon developed a set of thematic headings for the various forms of disorganized/disoriented behavior. Infant behaviors coded as disorganized/disoriented include sequential display of contradictory behavior patterns (Index I); simultaneous display of contradictory behavior patterns (II); undirected, misdirected, incomplete, and interrupted movements and expressions (III); stereotypies, asymmetrical movements, mistimed movements, and anomalous postures (IV); freezing, stilling, and slowed movements and expressions (V); direct indices of apprehension regarding the parent (VI); direct indices of disorganization or disorientation (VII).

Like the Ainsworth classifications, 'disorganized/disoriented attachment' with one caregiver little predicts the classification with another caregiver. This implies that the classification is tapping a quality of the relationship, and not merely the child's temperament.

A classification of disorganized/disoriented attachment has been found to be a risk factor for later development. For example, this classification in infancy has been found associated with school-age externalising problem behavior, indices of dissociation in adolescence and development of post-traumatic stress symptoms following trauma exposure. Behaviors associated with disorganization have been found to undergo transformation from the age of 2 and typically develop into various forms of well-organised controlling behavior toward the parent. Some children are overly solicitous and protective toward the parent (classified by Main and Cassidy as controlling-caregiving) while others are harshly directive or rudely humiliating toward the parent (classified controlling-punitive). A meta-analysis of 4 samples involving 223 children found a significant association between disorganization and school age controlling attachment behavior.

Main conceptualised disorganization/disorientation as representing some form of contradiction or disruption of the attachment system: either a conflict between simultaneous dispositions to physically approach and to flee the caregiver, or seeming disorientation to the environment. Other researchers have suggested that the dysregulation of negative affects can lead to disorganized behavior, even without a specific paradoxical injunction.

Main and Solomon did not intend to suggest that all of the behaviors used as indices of disorganization/disorientation – some kind of disruption at the level of the attachment system – necessarily mean the same thing in the same way for infant attachment or infant mental health. As Lyons-Ruth et al. have recently observed, "to date, few hypotheses have been advanced regarding the mechanisms underlying this striking difference among infants who display disorganized behavior".

=== Disorganized attachment and caregiving ===
After the initial presentation of protocols for coding D Strange Situation behavior in infants by Main and Solomon, researchers have explored the caregiving behavior associated with the classification. Together with Erik Hesse, in 1990 Main proposed that disorganized attachment behavior can be explained by a contradiction between the attachment system and another behavioral tendency. As the attachment system demands that the infant seek protection from the attachment figure when alarmed: "an infant who is frightened by the attachment figure is presented with a paradoxical problem – namely, an attachment figure who is at once the source of and the solution to its alarm." A parent who frightens the child with abusive behavior, or who themselves is frightened when the child seeks comfort because of past trauma, could be supposed to cause such a paradox for an infant. Research has supported this proposed association between frightening and frightened parental behavior and the infant's classification as D in the Strange Situation. This includes work by Main's students, such as Mary True (in Uganda) and Kazuko Behrens (in Japan). These ideas have been further examined by colleagues such as Marinus van IJzendoorn and Giovanni Liotti.

The image of parental frightening behavior as a causal pathway to disorganized infant attachment has captured the imagination of clinicians and social workers, and has sometimes led to the misuse of the concept of disorganized/disoriented attachment in screening for maltreatment. However, Main and Hesse have stated that they intended their emphasis on frightening or frightened caregiver behavior as "one highly specific and sufficient, but not necessary, pathway to D attachment status." Main and Hesse do not assume that fear in relation to the caregiver is always the proximate cause of disorganized/disoriented attachment behavior. This account has been supported by research findings which show that a range of factors can predict this behavior besides abuse and neglect. For example, unresolved loss, parental experiences of helplessness, a parent's ongoing experience of an anxiety disorder, multiple forms of social and economic disadvantage and major separation in the absence of maltreatment (e.g. in divorce proceedings) have also been found to predict infant disorganized attachment behavior. Out-of-home caregiving is not associated with disorganized attachment unless this is extremely extensive. Researchers have found that over 60 hours per week of day-care predicts disorganized attachment in the infant independently of the caregiver's behavior during the time they do interact.

Though it may be of interest to clinicians and social workers, the variety of reasons why non-maltreating parenting may be associated with infant disorganized/disoriented attachment is an important reason why it is not appropriate to use disorganized attachment as a screening tool for abuse. An additional issue for attempts at home screening of disorganized attachment is Main's finding that some infants classified as insecure-avoidant in the strange situation may show disorganized-type behaviors at home.

Interventions that reduce disorganization have been developed, for example, Video-feedback Intervention to promote Positive Parenting and Sensitive Discipline (VIPP) and the Attachment and Biobehavioral Catch-up (ABC) intervention. In VIPP, the intervener makes short film clips of the caregiver interacting with their child, and brings these clips for discussion with the caregiver, across 6-8 sessions. The intervener helps the caregiver consider the child's behaviours, their meanings, and how the child responds to the caregiver's own behaviors. The intervention highlights positive caregiver behaviors, allowing the caregiver to build on their own experience and serve as a role model for themselves. A meta-analysis of the first twenty-five randomised control trials of VIPP-SD found that the intervention led to more sensitive caregiver behaviour and less disorganized and more secure attachment relationships. Researchers found no indication of a decrease in effect size stemming from length of follow-up, suggesting that effects of the intervention remain stable over time. The ABC intervention is similar to VIPP, though with the intervener making more in-the-moment comments to the caregiver seeking to encourage nurturing and responsive care and - following Mary Main's theory - reduce alarming caregiver behavior. Results of randomized clinical trials have again found higher attachment security and lower attachment disorganization in the intervention group than the control group, suggesting this intervention is effective.

== Adult states of mind regarding attachment ==
Mary Main is also co-author of the Adult Attachment Interview (AAI). This semi-structured interview consists of 20 questions and takes about one hour to administer. During the interview, participants are asked to describe early childhood experiences with primary attachment figures and evaluate the impact of these experiences on their development. An illustrative copy of the Adult Attachment Interview Protocol is available.

In research conducted in the early 1980s with parents from a Berkeley sample, Main and colleagues found that transcribed responses to the AAI could be placed into one of three categories, named 'secure-autonomous', 'dismissing' and 'preoccupied'. Interviews categorised as secure-autonomous are characterised by their coherent and collaborative nature. The interviewees appear to be balanced and objective in their descriptions and evaluations of relationships and overall seem to value attachment. Interviews categorised as dismissing are characterised by inconsistent descriptions and evaluations of relationships. The interviewees may claim to have had positive attachment relationships and experiences but provide unconvincing or contradictory evidence to support this, or acknowledge negative experiences but insist these experiences have had little effect or only made them stronger. Interviews categorised as preoccupied are characterised by angry, vague, confused, or fearful fixation on particular attachment relationships or experiences.

Unlike the Strange Situation which assesses an infant's attachment security to a particular person, the Adult Attachment Interview does not assess attachment security with respect to any specific past or current relationship, but instead an individual's overall state of mind with respect to attachment. To illustrate the difference, Main has described how an individual who has no living family and no current romantic partner – so a person without a secure attachment in the present to any living persons – could be found to have a secure-autonomous state of mind with respect to attachment.

In their research with their Berkeley sample in the early 1980s, Main and colleagues also found that the three classifications of adult discourse they had identified correlated with the Ainsworth classifications of infant Strange Situation behavior. Secure-autonomous adult responses were associated with secure infant behavior towards the speaker, dismissing responses with insecure-avoidant infant behavior towards the speaker and preoccupied responses with insecure-ambivalent infant behavior towards the speaker. How a parent spoke about their own attachment history was therefore found to be associated with their infant's attachment behavior towards them in the Strange Situation, and subsequent research has replicated this finding. The association has even been found in research where the AAI has been conducted before the birth of the first child. That patterns of adult discourse correlate with infant behavior in the Strange Situation is a surprising and rather remarkable finding.

Prediction of different patterns of infant attachment security from the AAI is not based upon the actual attachment history of the parent, but on the way in which the parent recounts that history. Main has explained that "while the content of an individual's life history cannot change, it can be told or reconstructed in many differing ways". An individual who describes extremely negative childhood attachment experiences could be classified as having a secure-autonomous state of mind if they describe these experiences in a coherent and apparently objective way. This is termed discontinuous ('earned') security. Main has also emphasised that attachment states of mind should not be viewed as fixed and unalterable: "these… categorical placements… must be understood to reference only current, and potentially changeable, states of mind with respect to attachment."

In later work, Main, DeMoss and Hesse reviewed the AAI transcripts of parents of children classified disorganized in their attachment behavior, and found that these parents exhibited characteristic 'slips' or 'lapses' in their discourse when discussing potentially traumatic experiences of loss or abuse. Some speakers exhibited lapses in reasoning, for example, making incompatible statements (e.g. describing a person as both dead and alive) or describing themselves as causal in a death or abuse in a way that is clearly not possible (e.g. describing themselves as killing a person with a thought). Other speakers exhibited lapses in discourse, suddenly moving into speech that was excessively detailed, eulogistic in style or that involved prolonged and unacknowledged silences. AAI transcripts involving definitive examples of such lapses are classified 'unresolved/disorganized'. In common with the approach to classifying infant disorganized attachment, adults classified as unresolved are also assigned a best-fitting alternative classification. Unresolved/disorganized adult responses have been found associated with disorganized infant behavior towards the speaker.

A 'Cannot Classify' category has also been delineated by Hesse and Main which is used to describe interviews in which no single predominant attachment state of mind can be identified. Examples of cannot classify cases would include a transcript where the speaker's state of mind appears to shift mid-interview from dismissing to preoccupied, and a transcript where the speaker presents different states of mind when describing different attachment figures. Cannot classify interviews are rare in samples drawn from low-risk contexts.

Main and colleagues have developed a scoring and classification system for assessing AAI transcripts. Transcripts are not only allocated to one of the five major classifications described above, but also assigned scores on a number of different scales and assigned to one or more of 12 sub-classifications.

The AAI has been applied in both research and clinically. Research has found different AAI response patterns to be associated with different types of parental behavior. For example, secure-autonomous parents have been found to be more responsive to their infants than parents with a dismissing or preoccupied attachment state of mind. Unresolved responses to the AAI have been found associated with frightening, frightened or dissociative parental behaviour but it has also been found that only a small part of the association between unresolved states of mind and disorganized infant attachment can be explained by the mediation of anomalous parental behavior, indicating that other as yet unknown factors must also be involved. Some longitudinal studies have also found associations between attachment security in infancy, as assessed in the Strange Situation, and in young adulthood, as assessed by the AAI. In other studies however, no longitudinal association has been found. The evidence on the longitudinal stability of attachment security is therefore currently inconclusive.

Main, like Bowlby before her, has stressed that attachment "security is in no way fixed or fully determined in infancy." She has highlighted that a variety of favourable and unfavourable experiences may alter a child's developmental pathway and hence their state of mind with respect to attachment. A range of clinical applications of the AAI have also been proposed and developed. For example, the AAI has been applied to diagnosis, treatment, and the evaluation of therapeutic outcomes.

== Selected publications ==
Mary Main has more than 40 published journal articles and book chapters and has over 25,000 google scholar citations (as of January 2015). Selected publications are below:

- Main, M., Hesse, E., & Hesse, S. (2011). Attachment theory and research: Overview, with suggested applications to child custody. Family Court Review, 49, 426-463.
- Main, M., Hesse, E., & Goldwyn, R. (2008). Studying differences in language usage in recounting attachment history: An introduction to the AAI. In H. Steele & M. Steele (Eds.), Clinical applications of the Adult Attachment Interview (pp. 31–68). New York: Guilford Press.
- Hesse, E., & Main, M. (2006). Frightened, threatening, and dissociative parental behavior in low-risk samples: Description, discussion, and interpretations. Development and Psychopathology, Special Section on Frightened/frightening Behavior, 18, 309-343.
- Main, M., Hesse, E., & Kaplan, N. (2005). Predictability of attachment behavior and representational processes at 1, 6, and 18 years of age: The Berkeley Longitudinal Study. In K.E. Grossmann, K. Grossmann & E. Waters (Eds.), Attachment from Infancy to Adulthood (pp. 245–304). New York: Guilford Press.
- Main, M. (1991). Metacognitive knowledge, metacognitive monitoring, and singular (coherent) vs. multiple (incoherent) models of attachment: Some findings and some directions for future research. In P. Marris, J. Stevenson-Hinde & C. Parkes (Eds.), Attachment Across the Life Cycle (pp. 127–159). New York: Routledge.
- Main, M., & Hesse, E. (1990). Parents' unresolved traumatic experiences are related to infant disorganized attachment status: Is frightened and/or frightening parental behavior the linking mechanism? In M. T. Greenberg, D. Cicchetti & E. M. Cummings (Eds.), Attachment in the preschool years: Theory, research and intervention (pp. 161–182). Chicago: University of Chicago Press.
- Main, M., & Solomon, J. (1990). Procedures for identifying infants as disorganized/disoriented during the Ainsworth Strange Situation. In M.T. Greenberg, D. Cicchetti & E.M. Cummings (Eds.), Attachment in the preschool years: Theory, research and intervention (pp. 121–160). Chicago: University of Chicago Press.
- Main, M., & Solomon, J. (1986). Discovery of a new, insecure-disorganized/disoriented attachment pattern. In M. Yogman & T. B. Brazelton (Eds.), Affective development in infancy (pp. 95–124). Norwood, NJ: Ablex.
- Main, M., Kaplan, N., & Cassidy, J. (1985). Security in infancy, childhood and adulthood: A move to the level of representation. In I. Bretherton & E. Waters (Eds.), Growing points of attachment theory and research. Monographs of the Society for Research in Child Development, 50 (1-2, Serial No. 209), 66-104.
- Main, M. (1979). The ultimate causation of some infant attachment phenomena: Further answers, further phenomena, and further questions. Behavioral and Brain Sciences, 2, 640–643.
