= Mary Ainsworth =

American-Canadian psychologist & scholar

- Born: Mary Dinsmore Salter; December 1, 1913; Glendale, Ohio, U.S.
- Died: March 21, 1999 (aged 85); Charlottesville, Virginia, U.S.
- Education: University of Toronto
- Known for: Strange situation
- Spouse: Leonard Ainsworth (m. 1950; div. 1960)
- Scientific career
- Fields: Psychoanalysis
- Doctoral advisor: William E. Blatz

Mary Dinsmore Ainsworth (née Salter; December 1, 1913 – March 21, 1999) was an American-Canadian developmental psychologist known for her work in the development of the attachment theory. Over 40 years she worked closely with John Bowlby, who is credited with pioneering attachment theory.

Ainsworth was the first person to develop a validated scientific method to assess attachment, called the strange situation procedure. First applied in 1963, it involves observation of interactions between a child and their primary caregiver. From her research with this assessment tool she described three primary patterns of attachment which she originally labelled A, B, and C. These basic patterns continue to be a foundation piece for all major theories of attachment.

Her work on attachment science and theory became known as the Ainsworth-Bowlby model, or simply the ABC model of attachment. With the help of others, nine sub-patterns were described in the ABC model by the time of her death.

A 2002 Review of General Psychology survey ranked Ainsworth as the 97th most cited psychologist of the 20th century. Many of Ainsworth's studies are "cornerstones" of modern-day attachment theory.

== Life ==
Mary Dinsmore Salter was born in Glendale, Ohio on December 1, 1913, the eldest of three daughters born to Mary and Charles Salter. Her father, who possessed a master's degree in history, worked at a manufacturing firm in Cincinnati and her mother was a nurse. Both her parents were graduates of Dickinson College who placed "high value on a good liberal arts education" and expected their children to have excellent academic achievements. In 1918, her father's manufacturing firm transferred him and the family moved to Toronto, Ontario, Canada, where Salter would spend the rest of her childhood.

Salter was a precocious child who thirsted for knowledge. She began reading by the age of three, and the family would once a week visit the local library where her mother would select appropriate books for her level. She was close with her father, who assumed the duties of tucking her in at night and singing to her, but did not have a warm relationship with her mother; Salter later stated that their relationship was marked by her mother's jealousy and interference with the bond she had with her father. Salter excelled in school, and decided to become a psychologist after reading William McDougall's book Character and the Conduct of Life (1926) at the age of 15.

== Education ==
She began classes at the University of Toronto at the age of 16, where she was one of only five students to be admitted into the honors course in psychology. She completed coursework for her bachelor's degree in 1935, and decided to continue her education at the University of Toronto with the intention of earning her doctorate in psychology. She earned her master's degree in 1936 and her PhD was granted in 1939. Salter's dissertation was titled "An Evaluation of Adjustment Based on the Concept of Security". Her dissertation stated that "where family security is lacking, the individual is handicapped by the lack of a secure base from which to work."

After graduation, Salter stayed on at the University of Toronto as a teacher before joining the Canadian Women's Army Corps in 1942. While with the army, Salter began as an Army Examiner who interviewed and selected personnel in Kitchener, Ontario. Her duties included administering clinical evaluations and personnel assessment tests. Soon she was promoted as an Advisor to the Director of Personnel Selection of the Canadian Women's Army Corps, and reached the rank of major in 1945.

After victory in the war, Salter returned to Toronto to continue teaching personality psychology, conducted research, and worked with Klopfer on a revision of the Rorschach. She married Leonard Ainsworth, a graduate student in the Psychology department of University of Toronto, in 1950 and moved to London with him to allow him to finish his PhD at University College London. Although they divorced in 1960, the 10 years of accompanying Leonard to different places for his career gave Mary the opportunity to meet and work with many influential psychologists including John Bowlby, as well as the occasion when they moved to Kampala, Uganda where her first "mother-infant" observation was done.

After many other academic positions, including a long tenure at Johns Hopkins University, she eventually settled at the University of Virginia in 1975, where she remained for the rest of her academic career until 1984. From then she became a professor emeritus and stayed active until the year of 1992. While working at Johns Hopkins, Ainsworth did not receive the proper treatment considering her skills and expertise, such as a proper salary she deserved considering her age, experience, and contribution to the job. She had to wait two years for an associate professor position even though her qualifications surpassed the job description. At the time, women had to eat in separate dining rooms than men, which ultimately meant women could not meet male head department members the "normal way".

Ainsworth received many honors, including the G. Stanley Hall Award from APA for developmental psychology in 1984, the Award for Distinguished Contributions to Child Development in 1985 and the Distinguished Scientific Contribution Award from the American Psychological Association in 1989. She was elected a Fellow of the American Academy of Arts and Sciences in 1992. She died on March 21, 1999, at the age of eighty-five due to a stroke.

== Early work ==
During graduate school, Mary studied under the mentorship of William E. Blatz. Blatz focused on studying what he referred to as "security theory." This theory outlined Blatz's idea that different levels of dependence on parents meant different qualities of relationships with those parents, as well as the quality of relationships with future partners. His tiers of dependence were labeled secure dependence, independent security, immature dependent security, and mature secure dependence. Blatz theorized that the more secure and mature the interaction was between individuals, the more likely the relationship was to be healthy and without insecurities.

After leaving the Canadian Women's corps she returned to Toronto to continue teaching personality psychology and conducting research. She married Leonard Ainsworth in 1950 and moved to London with him to allow him to finish his graduate degree at University College. While in England, Ainsworth joined the research team of John Bowlby at the Tavistock Clinic, investigating the effects of maternal separation on child development. Comparison of disrupted mother-child bonds to normal mother-child relationships showed that a child's lack of a mother figure led to "adverse development effects."

In 1954, she left the Tavistock Clinic to do research in Africa where she carried out her longitudinal field study of mother-infant interaction. She chose to examine a common weaning practice in the area, in which the child is sent away for several days to live with relatives and "forget the breast." Ainsworth conducted detailed interviews with families from 6 villages surrounding Kampala, Uganda, but was originally met with a language barrier. She therefore made a great effort to learn the language to the extent that she could carry out simple conversation, thus developing an appreciation of the culture. She later said, "It is a pity that one cannot require field work in another society of every aspiring investigator of child development." Ainsworth's book from that field study, Infancy in Uganda, remains an exceptional and classic ethological study in the development of attachment and demonstrates that the process reflects specific universal characteristics that cross linguistic, cultural and geographic lines.

Mary Ainsworth followed her husband when a position as a forensic psychologist brought him to Baltimore. She spoke on clinical psychology at The Johns Hopkins University. In 1958, she was given a permanent position as an associate professor of developmental psychology. During this time at Johns Hopkins, Ainsworth's professional relationship with John Bowlby grew. While he had previously been a mentor, they started working together as equal partners, exchanging paper drafts for comments and finding the time to meet on rare occasions, since he was still primarily in London. Bowlby gave Ainsworth a copy of his new paper "The Nature of the Child's Tie to His Mother" for her comments and Ainsworth was able to provide Bowlby information on her studies of infant-mother attachment in Uganda.

Ainsworth underwent a difficult divorce in 1960, but continued with her research. She had an opportunity to present the findings from her Uganda study at a Tavistock Mother-Infant Interaction Study Group in London. It was her first time publicly presenting results, and the reactions were not enthusiastic. The primary question that developmental psychologists brought up was her definition of "attachment." Ainsworth was motivated by this and other questions to create a catalogue of behaviors like "crying when the mother left the room, following her, greeting her on return with smiling, vocalization, excited bouncing, reaching or approaching behavior" that she could use to qualify attachment.

== Strange situation ==
In 1965, Ainsworth designed the Strange Situation Procedure as a way of assessing individual differences in attachment behaviour by evoking individual's reaction when encountering stress. The Strange Situation Procedure is divided into eight episodes, lasting for three minutes each. In the first episode, the infant and their caregiver enter into a pleasant laboratory setting, with many toys. After one minute, a person unknown to the infant enters the room and slowly tries to make acquaintance. The caregiver leaves the child with the stranger for three minutes; and then returns. The caregiver departs for a second time, leaving the child alone for three minutes; it is then the stranger who enters, and offers to comfort the infant. Finally, the caregiver returns, and is instructed to pick up the child. As the episodes increase the stress of the infant by increments, the observer can watch the infant's movement between behavioural systems: the interplay of exploration and attachment behaviour, in the presence and in the absence of the parent.

On the basis of their behaviors, the 26 children in Ainsworth's original Baltimore study were placed into one of three classifications. Each of these groups reflects a different kind of attachment relationship with the caregiver, and implies different forms of communication, emotion regulation, and ways of responding to perceived threats. It also introduced the Maternal Care scale, which is used in empirical studies as an observational instrument to measure maternal sensitivity. Maternal sensitivity falls under the Sensitivity-Insensitivity Infant Signals and Communications scale part of the Maternal Care scale.

Despite the many findings from her Strange Situation experiment, there was also criticism. It was said to have too much emphasis on the mother and did not measure a general attachment style. It was said that Ainsworth's work was biased because the study was conducted with only middle class American families. Critics also believed the experiment was artificial and lacked ecological validity.

=== Anxious-avoidant insecure attachment ===
A child with the anxious-avoidant insecure attachment style will avoid or ignore the caregiver – showing little emotion when the caregiver departs or returns. The child will not explore very much regardless of who is there. There is not much emotional range regardless of who is in the room or if it is empty. Infants classified as anxious-avoidant (A) represented a puzzle in the early 1970s. They did not exhibit distress on separation, and either ignored the caregiver on their return (A1 subtype) or showed some tendency to approach together with some tendency to ignore or turn away from the caregiver (A2 subtype). Ainsworth and Bell (1970) theorised that the apparently unruffled behaviour of the avoidant infants is in fact as a mask for distress, a hypothesis later evidenced through studies of the heart-rate of avoidant infants.

=== Secure attachment ===
A child who's securely attached to its mother will explore freely while the caregiver is present, using her as a 'safe base' from which to explore. The child will engage with the stranger when the caregiver is present, and will be visibly upset when the caregiver departs but happy to see the caregiver on their return. In the United States, about seventy percent of middle-class babies present secure attachment in this study.

=== Anxious-resistant insecure attachment ===
Children classified as Anxious-Ambivalent/Resistant (C) showed distress even before separation, and were clingy and difficult to comfort on the caregiver's return. They either showed signs of resentment in response to the absence (C1 subtype), or signs of helpless passivity (C2 subtype). In Ainsworth's original sample, all six C infants showed so much distress in the course of the episodes of the Strange Situation Procedure 'that observations had to be discontinued.' One percent of infants had responded with high degree of passivity and inactivity in a situation of helpless settings.

=== Disorganized/disoriented attachment ===
A fourth category was added by Ainsworth's colleague Mary Main. In 1990, Ainsworth put in print her blessing for the new 'D' classification, though she urged that the addition be regarded as 'open-ended, in the sense that subcategories may be distinguished', as she worried that the D classification might be too encompassing and might subsume too many different forms of behaviour. In contrast to infants in other categories classified by Mary Ainsworth, which possess a standard path of reaction while dealing with the stress of separation and reunion, type D infants appeared to possess no symptom of coping mechanism. In fact, these infants had mixed features such as "strong proximity seeking followed by strong avoidance or appeared dazed and disoriented upon reunion with their caretakers (or both)."

From Project STEEP, infants that were having Disorganized/Disoriented (Type D) tested of secreting higher cortisol concentrations in saliva than infants in the traditional (ABC) classifications. Results of this study demonstrate a model of stress reactivity that reflects how the various classification of traditional (ABC) behaviors become a factor that is affecting physiological stress responses.

== Lifetime awards ==
- Phi Beta Kappa, University of Toronto
- Distinguished Contribution Award, Maryland Psychological Association (1973)
- Distinguished Scientific Contribution Award, Virginia Psychological Association (1983)
- Distinguished Scientific Contribution Award, Division 12 (Division of Clinical Psychology), American Psychological Association (APA; 1984)
- G. Stanley Hall Award, Division 7 (Division of Developmental Psychology), APA (1984)
- Salmon Lecturer, Salmon Committee on Psychiatry and Mental Hygiene, New York Academy of Medicine (1984)
- William T. Grant Lecturer in Behavioral Pediatrics, Society for Behavioral Pediatrics (1985)
- Award for Distinguished Contributions to Child Development Research, Society for Research in Child Development (1985)
- Award for Distinguished Professional Contribution to Knowledge, APA (1987)
- C. Anderson Aldrich Award in Child Development, American Academy of Pediatrics (1987)
- Distinctive Achievement Award, Virginia Association for Infant Mental Health (1989)
- Honorary Fellowship, Royal College of Psychiatrists (1989)
- Distinguished Scientific Contribution Award, APA (1989)
- American Academy of Arts and Sciences (1992)
- Distinguished Professional Contribution Award, Division 12 (Division of Clinical Psychology), APA (1994)
- International Society for the Study of Personal Relationships Distinguished Career Award (1996)
- Mentor Award, Division 7 (Division of Developmental Psychology), APA (1998)
- Gold Medal Award for Life Achievement in the Science of Psychology, American Psychological Foundation (APF, 1998)

== Major works ==
- Ainsworth, M. and Bowlby, J. (1965). Child Care and the Growth of Love. London: Penguin Books.
- Ainsworth, M. (1967). Infancy in Uganda. Baltimore: Johns Hopkins.
- Ainsworth, M., Blehar, M., Waters, E., & Wall, S. (1978). Patterns of Attachment. Hillsdale, NJ: Erlbaum.

== See also ==
- Attachment in children
- Attachment measures
- Reactive attachment disorder
- Princess Olufemi-Kayode
