= Video feedback intervention =

Video feedback interventions are used in health and social care situations. Typically a "guider" helps a client to enhance communication within relationships. The client is guided to analyse and reflect on video clips of their own interactions. Applications include a caregiver and infant (often used in attachment-based therapy), and other education and care home interactions. Video feedback interventions have also been used where concerns have been expressed over possible parental neglect in cases where the focus child is aged 2–12, and where the child is not the subject of a child protection plan.

== History ==
Colwyn Trevarthen, a Professor at Edinburgh University, studied successful interactions between infants and their primary care givers, and found that the mother's responsiveness to her baby's initiatives supported and developed intersubjectivity (shared understanding), which he regarded as the basis of all effective communication, interaction and learning. In the 1980s Harry Biemans, in the Netherlands, applied this research using video clips, creating Video Interaction Guidance (VIG). VIG is used in more than 15 countries and by at least 4000 practitioners.

More recently other video feedback interventions have been developed, including Video Enhanced Reflective Practice (VERP), a particular application of VIG. In 2008, the current version of the Video-feedback Intervention to Promote Positive Parenting and Sensitive Discipline (VIPP-SD) was finalized by Femmie Juffer, Marian Bakermans-Kranenburg, and Marinus van IJzendoorn of the Centre for Child and Family Studies at Leiden University.

== Research results and analysis ==
Research results include that video feedback interactions enhances positive parenting skills, decreases/alleviates parental stress and is related to more positive development of the children.

Analysis of why video feedback interventions are effective includes that the use of video clips enables a shared space to be created, where positive sensitivity and attunement moments can be seen. This allows clients to improve their relationship attunement skills, by developing their ability to mentalise about their own and their infants mental states, and by encouraging mind-minded interactions. (Trevarthen focuses particularly on how babies seek companionship, rather than using the term attachment, and has said "I think the ideal companion... is a familiar person who really treats the baby with playful human respect.")

Video Interaction Guidance, one example of video feedback interaction, has been used where concerns have been expressed over possible parental neglect in cases where the focus child is aged 2–12, and where the child is not the subject of a child protection plan. Am evaluation of the project demonstrated that VIG produced a significant change in the emotional and behavioural difficulties of the population of children who received the service, and improvement in reported level of parenting and reported parental relationship with their children in the population of parents whose children received the service. The data excludes to parents who failed to complete the programme, parents who completed the programme but decided not to complete evaluation measures, and on some measures parents who completed measures but whose feedback was adjudged to have been positively biased.

== Understanding the mechanisms through which Video Feedback Interaction works ==
Qualitative research studies have also illuminated some of the ways in which Video Feedback Interaction can help individual parents.

=== Attachment theory in action ===
Video feedback interventions, particularly VIPP-SD, have been created based on the attachment theory, developed by John Bowlby (1969) and Mary Ainsworth (1974). This theory suggests that an infant seeks comfort and protection from caregivers, and through their experiences they learn to seek this comfort selectively from caregivers they can rely on. Their behaviors with these caregivers depend on the infant's internal working models of these relationships. Bowlby explained in his writing of attachment theory that an infant should have an intimate, warm relationship with his caregiver in which they both find enjoyment. The interventions seek to create positive interactions between the child and caregiver, in order to change the child's internal working models of these relationships, leading to a change in the child's behavior.

=== Social learning theory in action ===
Evaluations have demonstrated that in certain cases parents have learned to improve their parenting in the way described by social learning theory. Social Learning Theory suggests people learn by observing positive desired outcomes resulting from the observed behaviour. Parents, with several children, who traditionally spent all their time with the children together in the group, started spending one-to-one time with individual children, after having been required by Video Interaction Guidance, to do one-on-one activities with a particular child, for the first time. Some parents started to do activities with their children, which involved a small element of risk, after having agreed to do them for the first time as part of Video Interaction Guidance. Similar findings are reported in an evaluation of the Triple P intervention.

=== The importance of the relationship between the practitioner and the parent ===
A principal factor which influences parents' engagement and perception is the quality of the relationship that they are able to build up with the practitioner delivering the programme. Key factors in helping practitioners engage parents into the intervention include:

- Establishing a sense that the practitioner will support the family beyond what is necessary to complete the intervention.
- Giving family members time to talk about their problems both during and out of appointments.
- Advocating for the family on issues with which the intervention is not directly concerned.
- Ensuring that fun forms a part of the interaction.
- Making family members feel cared for through the provision of clothes, food and gifts.
- Giving parents a lead in analysing family functioning and parenting.
- Carrying out the intervention in the home of the parent.
- Practitioners working on weekday evenings.

In the case of Video Interaction Guidance, when parents were asked about their experience of the intervention, parents invariably referred to the care and support provided by the practitioner. Effectively the intervention is experienced as an aspect of the overall relationship of care.

== See also ==
- Video interaction guidance
- Attachment-based therapy
- Attachment theory
- Attachment measures
- Attachment in children
- Child psychotherapy
- Mental health
- Colwyn Trevarthen
- Mental illness
