= Attachment-based therapy =

Psychological interventions

Attachment-based therapy applies to interventions or approaches based on attachment theory, originated by John Bowlby. Therapeutic approaches include working with individuals, couples, families, social systems, public health programs, and interventions specifically designed for adoption and foster care.

Attachment is a complex concept which continues to evolve. There are at least five attachment theories and several attachment assessments. These are generally in the developmental psychology or the social psychology disciplines which can differ in their understanding of relational problems and terminology describing the attachment concept. It's helpful to know which theory a therapy relies on, what part of the theory the therapy is addressing, and if the therapy is modifying the underlying theory. Failure to be clear about that has, in the past, led to coercive and harmful therapies allegedly based on attachment. Some attachment therapies utilize attachment assessments and some don't.

There may be a difference between the terms attachment based/focused/influenced/related, although it is likely hard to draw distinct lines. Because attachment describes a fundamental and universal human biopsychosocial system, most modern therapeutic models incorporate attachment to at least some degree. Not every such therapy can be identified in this article.

== Brief definition of attachment ==
The definition of attachment varies by theory and within theory branches. Theories vary in the breadth of issues which are or can be identified. This relates in part to the amount and quality of assessment methods the theory relies on.

Broadly, attachment describes a human system to support survival, reproduction, and protection of progeny. It's not unlike the fight-flight-freeze system albeit more complex, involving a collection of neurobiological systems working to optimize survival in relationship contexts. The attachment behavioral system starts to develop at around 7 months, or at least becomes observable, develops into patterns in the first several years of life, and continues to be an active and patterned system throughout the lifespan. Patterns sometimes change throughout.

Attachment is thought to involve a mix of interacting factors including neurobiology, genetics, epigenetics, emotion, affective and cognitive systems, memory systems, relationship experiences, and social and environmental factors. These all interact to influence responses by humans (and mammals and other animals) to danger across domains of emotions, behavior, thoughts, information processing, communication styles, the use of memory systems, and experience of trauma and loss. Attachment experiences can create biases in any of those domains.

Attachment theories describe the significance and effect of loss and trauma. Some theories describe attachment as a system relevant to understanding adult and romantic partner interactions. Some focus on a child or adult need for safety and the impact on defense mechanisms. Some on the need for protection from danger and need for comfort after exposure to danger and the impact on information processing and self-protective strategies.

Attachment and bonding share elements in common but they are distinguishable terms. Bonding-specific therapies are not necessarily identified in this article.

== Attachment theories and assessment methods ==
=== Ainsworth model (ABC) ===
Mary Ainsworth became Bowlby's colleague and they collaborated to develop attachment from 1940 to 1980. She was an American developmental psychologist who, in the 1960s, created the first scientific method to assess attachment, for a young child's attachment pattern. It is called the strange situation, or strange situation procedure (SSP), and is a highly respected assessment method used in many studies across the globe.

Ainsworth identified three primary patterns of attachment behaviors, which she initially labeled A, B, and C. Nine sub-patterns were identified by the time of her death A1, A2, B1, B2, B3, B4, B5, C1 and C2. These patterns endure in other models but go by different top level terms and may be described somewhat differently. Her patterns, method of assessment and theories are often called the Ainsworth model or the Bowlby-Ainsworth model or tradition, or the ABC model of attachment. Many therapies seek to address the challenges unique to each pattern. Some therapists can utilize an SSP or other age-appropriate assessment.

=== Berkeley model (ABC+D) ===
Beginning in the 1970s some of Ainsworth's graduate students in the developmental discipline, including Mary Main, helped to expand her theory and science. Some of this work was done at the University of California, Berkeley, with Main's graduate students, so their model is sometimes called the Berkely model. Carol George, Judith Solomon, Jude Cassidy, and Ruth Goldwyn are some of people commonly associated with this group.

George and colleagues developed several assessment methods including the Adult Attachment Interview (AAI) and Adult Attachment Projective (AAP). The AAI is used extensively in research, and considered a comprehensive, if complex, adult assessment. Some therapies and therapists use assessments as a tool or use findings and theory developed from AAI science as a foundation for working with the client., The Berkeley model assessment methods allowed attachment science to confirm that childhood attachment experiences can directly impact how adults direct their attention, feel, behave, think, communicate, respond to threat, experience trauma and loss, and utilize memory systems.

Disorganized attachment was a fourth pattern they believed they identified. Thus, their model is also called the ABC+D model. The concept of disorganized attachment became wildly popular, particularly among clinicians and social workers, and a massive amount of research was conducted using this concept. However the concept was eventually determined to have no clinical or forensic usefulness in a 2017 paper penned by lead author Pehr Granqvist and signed by 43 authors including the five theory developers identified above.

The ABC+D model differs in some respects to the Bowlby-Ainsworth model, and there are branched ABC+D theories. Not counting any disorganized patterns, this model expanded Ainsworth's original nine patterns to something over 20 total attachment sub-patterns, with different descriptions for children and adults.

=== Social psychology models (romantic/adult attachment) ===
Also beginning in the 1970s, social psychologists developed an attachment theory from Bowlby's and Ainsworth's work, and from the perspective of their discipline. Several theory modifications branched off. Proponents include Phillip Shaver, Mario Mikulincer, Chris Fraley, Kelly Brennan, and Kim Bartholomew. These tend to focus on adult romantic and other significant adult relationships, and are described as romantic attachment, or vaguely "adult attachment". They developed a variety of self-report questionnaires to use in research, clinical settings, and for individual and group therapy, notably the Experiences in Close Relationships (ECR) measure. They utilize a set of terms and concepts often similar but often apparently or noticeably different than those used in the developmental tradition. It's unclear how closely the attachment phenomena they describe is to that described by development-based models. Sometimes the same words in the two disciplines are the same, congruent, or have quite different meanings. Sometimes they use the disorganized attachment concept, and sometimes a different concept called fearful attachment as a fourth attachment pattern.

The essence of this model is that attachment describes a person's search for protection and support in times of need and the psychological consequences of gaining and losing a sense of security. The model has sought to expand coverage from the self and dyads to cover dynamics in social, organizational, and religious groups.

=== Dynamic Maturational Model of Attachment and Adaptation (DMM, ABC+DMM) ===
Patricia Crittenden began to develop the Dynamic-Maturational Model of Attachment and Adaptation in the 1980s. Between 1990-2010 she developed a comprehensive lifespan model centered more squarely on the Bowlby-Ainsworth tradition, and particularly expanded from Bowlby's ideas about information processing. In many ways the DMM is generally consistent with the ABC+D model and the developmental tradition, and arguably offers more clarity and insight from better definitional precision.

The DMM maintains the Ainsworth ABC alphanumeric system and expands the patterns to 26 primary sub-patterns. It also describes how opposing patterns can be alternated or blended. It never included disorganized as an attachment concept.

Crittenden updated the AAI and SSP assessments, and developed a comprehensive suite of lifespan attachment assessments. Additional DMM-based assessments have been developed by others. Like Bowlby, the DMM incorporates scientific findings from many additional disciplines. Thus, it provides an updated model of attachment as well as a more comprehensive biopsychosocial model describing the way exposure to danger, including relationship danger, impacts how humans feel, behave, think, communicate, respond to threat, experience trauma and loss, and utilize memory systems. It also addresses specific issues such as depression, disorientation, and use of distorted, omitted, falsified, denied and delusional information.

The essence of this model is that the attachment system describes a relationship between a person who needs protection from danger and a relationship with a person who can provide protection and comfort, the effect on each from the interaction of the relationship. It also offers a comprehensive method of discourse analysis and model of how people process information in the context of exposure to danger. The Family Relations Institute supports the DMM.

== Evidence-based approaches ==
=== Child–parent psychotherapy (CPP) ===
Child–Parent Psychotherapy (CPP) is an intervention designed to treat the relationship between children ages 0–5 and their caregivers after exposure to trauma or in high risk situations. This intervention was developed in part from infant-parent psychotherapy, a psychoanalytic approach, and was expanded by Alicia Lieberman and colleagues into child–parent psychotherapy, a manualized intervention. CPP incorporates attachment theory by considering how attachment relationships are formed between child and caregiver, how challenges may influence attachment relationships, and how caregiver's sensitivity may influence the attachment behavior system for infants and toddlers.

The "patient" is the infant–caregiver relationship. Primary treatment goals are to restore a child's sense of security through the parent-child relationship, enhance caregiver sensitivity, and reduce attachment avoidance and resistance. A broader goal is to support the parent-child relationship in order to strengthen cognitive, social, behavioral, and psychological functioning. It also addresses current life stresses and cultural values. CPP is delivered in one 1–1.5-hour session per week for a year, with both the child and the caregiver/s. In treatment, the child and caregiver are introduced to the formulation triangle. The triangle helps the child and caregiver to visualize how experiences influence behaviors and feelings and how CPP treatment will target those behaviors and feelings to in turn change experiences. CPP treatment encourages joint play, physical contact, and communication between the child and caregiver. The therapist serves to guide treatment, interpret thoughts and behaviors, and emotionally support the child and caregiver.

CPP has been examined in research studies in different countries. The studies claim to have found positive outcomes to reduce behavioral challenges, effects of trauma on preschoolers and/or caregivers, exposure to marital violence, marital satisfaction after parent-child treatment, and lowered a trauma-sensitive epigenetic biomarker of accelerated biological aging which is associated with later health impairment. It has been applied in legal settings, and in the border separation context.

The CPP, and other attachment-informed therapies, have been discussed in the journal Research on Child and Adolescent Psychopathology, including Volume 49, May 2021. A 7-year longitudinal study with assessment at three time points demonstrated CPP was effective to increase the likelihood of a secure attachment between a child and mother with depressive symptoms. By age 9, the children with CPP treatment had less anger and problem behaviors and the mothers were warmer to their children. Some researchers commented about the challenges and shortcomings to applying attachment in therapy. Criticisms include that there are no very long term cohort studies, and that it is difficult to identify with clarity why the treatment is successful.

Training for CPP is conducted through the Early Trauma Treatment Network, a division of the Substance Abuse and Mental Health Services Administration's National Child Traumatic Stress Network (NCTSN). CPP training lasts 18 months.

=== Attachment and Biobehavioral Catch-Up (ABC) ===
Attachment and Biobehavioral Catch-Up (ABC) is a parenting intervention for primary caregivers of infants and toddlers. It is a 10-week long intervention that consists of 10 one-hour sessions conducted on a weekly basis. It's usable by therapists, social workers, and parenting coaches in a wide range of situations including legal contexts. Each session is led by a certified parent-coach and occurs at home. It is supported by the ABC Parenting Institute and numerous government agencies.

The three goals of the intervention are to:

1. Increase nurturing behaviors of the caregiver
2. Enhance the caregiver's ability to follow the child's lead with delight
3. Decrease potentially intrusive, harsh, or frightening behaviors of the caregiver

The ability of young children to regulate their behaviors, emotions, and physiology is strongly associated with the quality of the relationship they have with their caregiver. By changing or optimizing the caregiver's behavior, ABC also seeks to help young children enhance their behavioral and regulatory capabilities. Studies have shown that ABC improves child attachment quality, increases caregiver sensitivity to child's behavioral signals, and boosts children's executive functioning.

ABC intervention was originally developed by Dr. Mary Dozier at the University of Delaware for caregivers of infants ages 6–24 months (ABC-Infant), and has since been expanded to include toddlers ages 24–48 months (ABC-Toddler). It was initially designed for caregivers and infants who had experienced early adversity such as abuse, neglect, poverty, and/or placement instability, and was expanded to provide attachment-based parenting education for any family.

=== The Bakermans-Kranenburg, Van IJzendoorn and Juffer meta analysis ===
This was an attempt to collect and synthesise the data to try to come to "evidence-based" conclusions on the best intervention practices for attachment in infants. There were four hypotheses:

- Early intervention on parental sensitivity and infant attachment security is effective.
- Type and timing of programme makes a difference.
- Intervention programmes are always and universally effective.
- Changes in parental sensitivity are causally related to attachment security.

The selection criteria were very broad, intending to include as many intervention studies as possible. Sensitivity findings were based on 81 studies involving 7,636 families. Attachment security involved 29 studies and 1,503 participants. Assessment measures used were the Ainsworth sensitivity rating, Ainsworth et al. (1974), the Home Observation for Measurement of the Environment, Caldwell and Bradley (1984), the Nursing Child Assessment Teaching Scale, Barnard et al. (1998) the Erickson rating scale for maternal sensitivity and supportiveness, Egeland et al. (1990).

The conclusion was that "Interventions with an exclusively behavioural focus on maternal sensitivity appear to be most effective not only in enhancing maternal sensitivity but also in promoting children's attachment security."

==== "Watch, wait and wonder" ====
This intervention involved mothers and infants referred for a community health service. Presenting problems included feeding, sleeping, behavioural regulation, maternal depression and feelings of failure in bonding or attachment. The randomly assigned control group undertook psychodynamic psychotherapy.

The primary work is between mother and therapist. It is based on the notion of the infant as initiator in infant–parent psychotherapy. For half the session the mother gets down on the floor with the infant, observes it and interacts only on the infant's initiative. The idea is that it increases the mother's sensitivity and responsiveness by fostering an observational reflective stance, whilst also being physically accessible. Also the infant has the experience of negotiating their relationship with their mother. For the second half the mother discusses her observations and experiences.

Infants in the watch, wait and wonder group were significantly more likely to shift to a secure or organised attachment classification than infants in the psychodynamic psychotherapy group although there was no differential treatment effect in maternal sensitivity. It has been pointed out however that specific caregiver responses to attachment (the precursors to secure attachments) were not measured.

A UK review found that Watch, Wait and Wonder was the 8th most common intervention used in the UK. It found that the evidence base to support the intervention was weak. The review also found that the most commonly used interventions had a limited evidence base and other interventions with a strong evidence base were the least commonly used.

==== "Manipulation of sensitive responsiveness" ====
This intervention focused on low socio-economic group mothers with irritable infants, assessed on a behavioural scale. The randomly assigned group received 3 treatment sessions, between the ages of 6 and 9 months, based on maternal responsiveness to negative and positive infant cues. Intervention was based on Ainsworth's sensitive responsiveness components, namely perceiving a signal, interpreting it correctly, selecting an appropriate response and implementing the response effectively.

It was found that these infants scored significantly higher than the control infants on sociability, self soothing and reduced crying. All maternal components improved. Further, a 'strange situation' assessment carried out at 12 months showed only 38% classified as insecure compared to 78% in the control group.

Follow ups at 18, 24 and 42 months using Ainsworth's Maternal Sensitivity Scales, the Bayley Scales of Infant Development, the Child Behaviour Checklist (Achenbach) and the Attachment Q-sort showed enduring significant effects in secure attachment classification, maternal sensitivity, fewer behaviour problems, and positive peer relationships.

==== "Modified interaction guidance" ====
This intervention aimed to reduce inappropriate caregiver behaviours as measured on the AMBIANCE (atypical maternal behaviour instrument for assessment and classification). Such inappropriate behaviours are thought to contribute to disorganized attachment. The play focused intervention (MIG) was compared with a behaviour modification intervention focused on feeding. A significant decrease in inappropriate maternal behaviours and disrupted communication was found in the MIG group.

=== Feedback methods ===
==== Videofeedback intervention to promote positive parenting (VIPP) ====
Developed and evaluated by Juffer, Bakermans-Kranenburg and Van IJzendoorn, this collection of interventions aim to promote maternal sensitivity through the review of taped infant–parent interactions and written materials. The programme can also be expanded to include the parents internal working models (VIPP-R) and/or sensitive disciplinary practices (VIPP-SD). Findings from randomized controlled trials are mixed but overall supportive of efficacy, particularly for "highly reactive infants" and in reducing later externalising behaviours. The various versions show promise but research continues.

==== Clinician assisted videofeedback exposure sessions (CAVES) ====
Developed by Daniel Schechter and colleagues. They developed an experimental paradigm informed by attachment theory called the Clinician Assisted Videofeedback Exposure Sessions to test whether traumatized mothers, who often suffered psychological sequelae from a history of abuse and violence, could "change their mind" about their young children. The technique used was to watch video-excerpts of play, separation and similarly stressful moments in the presence of a clinician who asks the mother to think about what she (and her child) might be thinking and feeling at the time of the excerpt and at the moment of videofeedback. It applies the principles of mentalization as an aide to emotional regulation with these traumatized parents. It also involves elements of prolonged exposure treatment, the video-based treatment Interaction Guidance, and psychodynamically oriented child–parent psychotherapy. Schechter and colleagues showed a significant change in the way mothers perceived their own child and their relationship together.

==== VIG (video interaction guidance) ====
In video interaction guidance the client is guided to analyse and reflect on video clips of their own interactions (e.g. a mother with her infant). Research results include that VIG enhances positive parenting skills, decreases/alleviates parental stress and is related to more positive development of the children. VIG is recommended by NICE in the UK.

== Public health programs ==
=== Tamar's Children ===
This is a scheme in which a version of the Circle of Security intervention was added to a jail diversion program for pregnant women with a history of substance abuse. Preliminary data indicates a 68% rate of secure infant–mother attachment in the first relatively small (19) sample. This is a rate of secure attachment typically found in low risk samples.

=== Florida Infant Mental Health Pilot Program ===
This project tested the provision of 25 sessions of child–parent psychotherapy (see above) for mothers investigated or substantiated for child maltreatment through court-based teams. There were no further reports of maltreatment by participants during and immediately after the programme and positive changes in maternal and child behaviours were noted. The advocacy organisation Zero to Three is supporting such teams being established in other states.

== Foster care interventions ==
=== New Orleans Intervention/Tulane Infant Team ===
This is a foster care intervention devised by J.A. Larrieu and C.H Zeanah in 1998. The program is designed to address the developmental and health needs of children under the age of 5 who have been maltreated and placed in foster care. It is funded by the state government of Louisiana and private funds. It is a multidisciplinary approach involving psychiatrists, psychologists, social workers, paediatricians and paraprofessionals—all with expertise in child development and developmental psychopathology.

The aim of the intervention is to support the building of an attachment relationship between the child and foster carers, even though about half of the children eventually return to their parents after about 12 to 18 months. The designers note Mary Doziers program to foster the development of relationships between children and foster carers (ABC) and her work showing the connection between foster children's symptomology and foster carers attachment status. Work is based on findings that the qualitative features of a foster parents narrative descriptions of the child and relationship with the child have been strongly associated with the foster parents behavior with the child and the child's behavior with them. The aim was to develop a programme for designing foster care as an intervention.

The theoretical base is attachment theory. There is a conscious effort to build on recent, although limited, research into the incidence and causes of reactive attachment disorder and risk factors for RAD and other psychopathologies.

Soon after coming into care the children are intensively assessed, in foster care, and then receive multi modal treatments. Foster carers are also formally assessed using a structured clinical interview which includes in particular the meaning of the child to the foster parent. Individualised interventions for each child are devised based on age, clinical presentation and information on the child/foster carer match. The assessment 'team' remains involved in delivering the intervention. Those running the programme maintain regular phone and visit contact and there are support groups for foster parents.

Barriers to attachment are considered to be as follows;

- The disturbed nature of the child's relationship with its parent(s) before their removal by the state. Serious relationship disturbances are considered likely to be important contributors to difficulties in establishing new attachment relationships. Psychiatric and substance abuse histories and other criminal activities are common. Developmental delays in the children are common and there is a considerable range of regulatory, socioemotional and developmental problems. The child may perceive relationships as inconsistent and undependable. Further, despite harsh and inconsistent treatment many of the children remain attached to their parents, complicating the development of new attachment relationships.
- Foster parents may also present barriers to forming healthy attachment relationships. Based on Bowlby, the caregiving system is seen as a biobehavioral system in adults that is complementary to the child's attachment system. Not all foster carers have this strong biological disposition as many fear becoming too 'attached' and suffering loss, many are effectively doing it to earn money and some perceive such children as 'damaged goods' and may remain emotionally distant and under involved.

Interventions include supporting foster parents to learn to help the child in regulating emotions, to learn to respond effectively to the child's distress and to understand the child's signals, especially 'miscues' as the signals of such children are often confusing as a consequence of their often frightening, inconsistent and confusing past relationships. Foster carers are taught to recognize what such children actually need rather than what they may appear to signal that they need. Such children often exhibit provocative and oppositional behaviors which may normally trigger feelings of rejection in caregivers. Withdrawn children may be overlooked and seemingly independent, indiscriminate children may be considered to be managing much better than they are. Foster carers are regularly contacted and visited to assess their needs and progress.

As of 2005, 250 children had participated in the programme. Outcome data published in 2001 revealed a 68% reduction in maltreatment recidivism for the same child returning to its parent(s)and a 75% reduction in recidivism for a subsequent child of the same mother. The authors claim the programme not only assists the building of new attachments to foster parents but also has the potential impact a families development long after a returned child is no longer in care.

== Controversial attachment therapies ==
From the 1970s into the 2000s, early efforts to understand and address intense attachment challenges led to the proposal of several extreme therapies. They went by a variety of names including holding therapy, compression therapy, coercive restraint therapy, rage-reduction, and rebirthing. For a short time period these were popularly referred to as "attachment therapy", and for a brief time period holding therapy was renamed "attachment therapy". These were largely based on ideas of attachment as being a psychiatric disorder and on rage theory. They were characterized by forced restraint of children in order to make them relive attachment-related anxieties, or to invoke the child into a state of rage from with catharsis and healing was thought would follow. The conceptual focus of these treatments was the child's individual internal pathology and past caregiver-child relationships rather than current caregiver-child relationships or current environment. These practices and their related diagnostic methods lacked scientific validity and were considered incompatible with attachment theory and its emphasis on a 'secure base', safety, and protection from danger.

In 2003 and 2005, well-known experts in the field of attachment science research condemned these therapy models as empirically unfounded, theoretically flawed, clinically unethical, and potentially abusive. Child fatalities were documented in at least six cases. In 2006, the American Professional Society on the Abuse of Children (APSAC) Task Force reported on these therapies, reactive attachment disorder, and other attachment problems, and laid down guidelines for the future diagnosis and treatment of maltreated children. The Taskforce was largely critical of the therapies' theoretical bases, practices, claims to an evidence base, non-specific symptom lists published on the internet, claims that traditional treatments did not work, and dire predictions for the future of children who did not receive holding type therapies. The use of these therapies, and the controversy around them, appears to have abated shortly after the APSAC report. Around that time, several proponents of these coercive therapies were convicted of crimes or lost their medical licenses.

== See also ==
- Attachment measures
- Attachment in children
- Child psychotherapy
- Dyadic developmental psychotherapy
- Dynamic-maturational model of attachment and adaptation
- Play therapy
- Mental health
- Parent–child interaction therapy
