= Interaction theory =

Psychological theory

Interaction theory (IT) is an approach to questions about social cognition, or how one understands other people, that focuses on bodily behaviors and environmental contexts rather than on mental processes. IT argues against two other contemporary approaches to social cognition (or what is sometimes called ‘theory of mind’), namely theory theory (TT) and simulation theory (ST). For TT and ST, the primary way of understanding others is by means of ‘mindreading’ or ‘mentalizing’ – processes that depend on either theoretical inference from folk psychology, or simulation. In contrast, for IT, the minds of others are understood primarily through our embodied interactive relations. IT draws on interdisciplinary studies and appeals to evidence developed in developmental psychology, phenomenology, and neuroscience.

== Origins ==
According to Michael et al (2013), “The recent surge of interactionist approaches to social cognition can be traced back to Shaun Gallagher’s proposal for a new approach to social cognition, which he labeled ‘interaction theory’. Gallagher argued that mainstream mindreading approaches neglect the interactive contexts in which social cognition is embedded, and thereby overlook embodied and extended processes that are engaged in interactions, and which are important components of social cognition.”

The basic ideas of IT can be traced back to the work of Colwyn Trevarthen, who coined the term ‘primary intersubjectivity’ to refer to early developing sensory-motor processes of interaction between infants and caregivers. Other work in developmental psychology by Daniel Stern, Andrew N. Meltzoff, Peter Hobson, Vasu Reddy, and others, provides important evidence for the role of interaction in social cognition. Similar insights can be found earlier in the work of the phenomenologists, like Max Scheler and Maurice Merleau-Ponty. IT has also motivated a rethinking in the methods for studying social cognition in neuroscience.

== Primary and secondary intersubjectivity ==
Colwyn Trevarthen coined the term ‘primary intersubjectivity’ to refer to early developing sensory-motor processes of interaction between infants and their caregivers. Important cues for understanding others are provided by their facial expressions, bodily posture and movements, gestures, actions, and in processes of neonate imitation, proto-conversations, gaze following and affective attunement. "In most intersubjective situations, that is, in situations of social interaction, we have a direct perceptual understanding of another person’s intentions because their intentions are explicitly expressed in their embodied actions and their expressive behaviors. This understanding does not require us to postulate or infer a belief or a desire hidden away in the other person’s mind. What we might reflectively or abstractly call their belief or desire is expressed directly in their actions and behaviors."

Sometime during the first year of life infants also start to enter into joint attention situations and begin to pay attention to how others act and what they do with objects in everyday contexts, and this also provides a way to understand their intentions and contextualized actions. This is referred to as ‘secondary intersubjectivity’, which highlights the fact that interactions often take place in cooperative contexts. During most interactions, intentions are apparent based upon the pragmatic context of the situation in which they are occurring. We can instantly see what the other “intends” or “wants” based upon their actions and the current context; we do not need to infer their intentions as if they are hidden away. There is a “shared world” that we live in where we intuitively and instinctively perceive others as minded beings like ourselves.

== Direct perception ==
Interaction theory supports the notion of the direct perception of the other's intentions and emotions during intersubjective encounters. Gallagher argues that most of what we need for our understanding of others is based on our interactions and perceptions, and that very little mindreading occurs or is required in our day-to-day interactions. Rather than first perceiving another’s actions and then inferring the meaning of their actions (as in TT), the intended meaning is perceptible in the other person’s movements and contextualized actions. Differences in a person’s intentions show up as differences in perceptible kinematic properties of action movements. A person’s emotions are not only expressed on their faces and in their postures and gestures, but these perceptible embodied aspects help to constitute what the emotion is. Mental states (like intentions and emotions) are therefore not hidden away from view, they are, IT claims, in fact, and at least in part, bodily states that are apparent in the action movements that constitute them. For example, as phenomenologists from Max Scheler to Dan Zahavi point out, upon seeing an angry face an observer does not first see a face that is contorted into a scowl and then infer that the target is angry. The anger is immediately apparent on the face of the other. The overwhelming majority of interactions in our daily lives are face-to-face so it makes sense that our primary way of understanding one another is from a second-person perspective rather than from the detached, theoretical, third-person perspective described by TT and ST.

== Narrative competency ==
In addition to primary and secondary intersubjectivity, and the contributing dynamics of interaction itself to the social cognitive process, IT proposes that more nuanced and sophisticated understandings of others are based, not primarily on folk psychological theory or the use of simulation, but on the implicit and explicit uses of narrative. IT builds on the notion that the pervasiveness of narratives in most cultures, from the earliest nursery rhymes to the performances of theater, film, and television, expose us to a variety of characters, situations, and reasons for acting in certain ways. These, combined with personal narratives, provide the background knowledge that allows us to implicitly frame the actions of others in understandable narratives, providing a fallible and revisable sense of what the other is up to.
