= Video interaction guidance =

Type of video feedback intervention

Video interaction guidance (VIG) is a video feedback intervention through which a “guider” helps a client to enhance communication within relationships. The client is guided to analyse and reflect on video clips of their own interactions. Applications include a caregiver and infant (often used in attachment-based therapy), and other education and care home interactions. VIG is used in more than 15 countries and by at least 4000 practitioners. Video Interaction Guidance has been used where concerns have been expressed over possible parental neglect in cases where the focus child is aged 2–12, and where the child is not the subject of a child protection plan.

== History ==
Colwyn Trevarthen, a Professor at Edinburgh University, studied successful interactions between infants and their primary care givers, and found that the mother's responsiveness to her baby's initiatives supported and developed intersubjectivity (shared understanding), which he regarded as the basis of all effective communication, interaction and learning. In the 1980s Harry Biemans, in the Netherlands, applied this research using video clips, creating VIG.

== Research results ==
Research results include that VIG enhances positive parenting skills, decreases/alleviates parental stress, increases parenting enjoyment, improves parental attitudes to parenting, and is related to more positive development of the children, although the effect at child-level is reduced in high-risk families. One study found an increase in sensitivity of mothers but no impact on infant attachment. VIG has also been found to increase the child sensitivity of teachers. The limitations of the experimental studies undertaken so far, such as their small number of subjects, are acknowledged, and more research is needed.

Research linking VIG use to better subsequent long-term mental health of the child has not been published, but parenting is a causal risk factor for mental illness, and some mental health NGO's are pursuing programmes on expectation of a positive link.

Video Interaction Guidance has been used where concerns have been expressed over possible parental neglect in cases where the focus child is aged 2–12, and where the child is not the subject of a child protection plan. Am evaluation of the project demonstrated that VIG produced a significant change in the emotional and behavioural difficulties of the population of children who received the service, and improvement in reported level of parenting and reported parental relationship with their children in the population of parents whose children received the service. The data excludes to parents who failed to complete the programme, parents who completed the programme but decided not to complete evaluation measures, and on some measures parents who completed measures but whose feedback was adjudged to have been positively biased. Parents also reported developing a better understanding of the following aspects of good parenting:

· Giving each of their children one-to-one time.

· Giving children space to make choices and develop skills.

· Listening to children and not interrupting.

· Making eye contact when talking to children.

· Taking children out to parks and finding activities for them to do.

· The importance of good relationships between separated parents.

== Theories of effectiveness ==
Theories of why VIG is effective includes that the use of video clips enables a shared space to be created, where positive sensitivity and attunement moments can be seen. This allows clients to improve their relationship attunement skills, by developing their ability to mentalise about their own and their infants mental states, and by encouraging mind-minded interactions. (Trevarthen focuses particularly on how babies seek companionship, rather than using the term attachment, and has said "I think the ideal companion... is a familiar person who really treats the baby with playful human respect.")

== Understanding the mechanisms through which Video Interaction Guidance works ==
Qualitative research studies have also illuminated some of the ways in which Video Interaction Guidance can help individual parents.

=== Social learning theory in action ===
Evaluations have demonstrated that in certain cases parents have learned to improve their parenting in the way described by social learning theory. Social Learning Theory suggests people learn by observing positive desired outcomes resulting from the observed behaviour. Parents, with several children, who traditionally spent all their time with the children with the children together in the group, started spending one-to-one time with individual children, after having been required by Video Interaction Guidance, to do one-on-one activities with a particular child, for the first time. Some parents started to do activities with their children, which involved a small element of risk, after having agreed to do them for the first time as part of Video Interaction Guidance. Similar findings are reported in an evaluation of the Triple P intervention.

=== The importance of the relationship between the practitioner and the parent ===
A principal factor which influences parents' engagement and perception is the quality of the relationship that they are able to build up with the practitioner delivering the programme. Key factors in helping practitioners engage parents into the intervention include:

- Establishing a sense that the practitioner will support the family beyond what is necessary to complete the intervention.
- Giving family members time to talk about their problems both during and out of appointments.
- Advocating for the family on issues with which the intervention is not directly concerned.
- Ensuring that fun forms a part of the interaction.
- Making family members feel cared for through the provision of clothes, food and gifts.
- Giving parents a lead in analysing family functioning and parenting.
- Carrying out the intervention in the home of the parent.
- Practitioners working on weekday evenings.

In the case of Video Interaction Guidance, when parents were asked about their experience of the intervention, parents invariably referred to the care and support provided by the practitioner. Effectively the intervention is experienced as an aspect of the overall relationship of care.

== Recommendations and use ==
VIG is recommended in the UK by NICE (the National Institute for Health and Clinical Excellence) and is one of two interventions recommended by the NSPCC to improve parenting. It is also recommended for health visitors. The European Union DataPrev database also recommends VIG.

VIG is used by NHS and other health services providers.

In 2014 the UK NGO Mental Health Foundation and partners began to use VIG in an early years intervention to prevent mental illness in later life.

== Training ==
AVIGuk, a UK 'association of supervisors', manages 18 month training programmes in the UK. Most research results have involved guiders who have undertaken such training.

In the United States, CVIG-USA, The Center for Video Interaction Guidance USA, the national training institute for VIG, trains agency staff and supervisors in applying the model for parent education, family support and therapy, staff training and development and leadership development.

== Criticisms ==
VIG has been criticised for only focusing on positive factors, but this criticism has not been substantiated in terms of making VIG ineffective.

The length and cost of the VIG training that AVIGuk provides has been criticised, on the grounds that this limits scalability and prevents wider use of VIG. This is shown in the emergence of similar video feedback interventions with much shorter training, such as Video Enhanced Reflective Practice (VERP), a particular application of VIG, and Video-feedback Intervention to Promote Positive Parenting and Sensitive Discipline (VIPP-SD), and other 'introductory' VIG courses.

== See also ==
- Attachment-based therapy
- Attachment theory
- Attachment measures
- Attachment in children
- Child psychotherapy
- Mental health
- Colwyn Trevarthen
- Mental illness
