= Trevarthen =

Trevarthen is a surname. Notable people with the surname include:

- Colwyn Trevarthen (1931–2024), British child psychologist
- William Trevarthen (1878–1927), New Zealand rugby footballer
