= Dynamic-maturational model of attachment and adaptation =

Biopsychosocial model developed from attachment theory

The dynamic-maturational model of attachment and adaptation (DMM) is a biopsychosocial model describing the effect attachment relationships can have on human development and functioning. It is especially focused on the effects of relationships between children and parents and between reproductive couples. It developed initially from attachment theory as developed by John Bowlby and Mary Ainsworth, and incorporated many other theories into a comprehensive model of adaptation to life's many dangers. The DMM was initially created by developmental psychologist Patricia McKinsey Crittenden and her colleagues including David DiLalla, Angelika Claussen, Andrea Landini, Steve Farnfield, and Susan Spieker.

A main tenet of the DMM is that exposure to danger drives neural development and adaptation to promote survival. Danger includes relationship danger. In DMM-attachment theory, when a person needs protection or comfort from danger from a person with whom they have a protective relationship, the nature of the relationship generates relation-specific self-protective strategies. These are patterns of behavior which include the underlying neural processing. The DMM protective strategies describe aspects of the parent–child relationship, romantic relationships, and to a degree, relationships between patients/clients and long-term helping professionals.

== History ==
Out of the development of attachment theory, British psychiatrist John Bowlby coalesced a coherent theory and is generally credited with creating the foundation for modern attachment theory. Mary Ainsworth, an American-Canadian psychologist, started working with Bowlby in 1950. Ainsworth completed her doctoral thesis in 1940 under William Blatz, who had developed security theory, a precursor to attachment theory. Blatz believed the core nature of the relationship between a (to use his colloquial terms) mother and child involved the development of a trusted and secure relationship to function as a safe base for a child's need to explore. This set an initial foundation for the developing theory of attachment as involving a two-pattern model, security vs insecurity, centered on safety and play.

However, throughout the 1950s, both Ainsworth and Bowlby began developing a three-pattern model centered on danger and survival. In the 1960s, Ainsworth developed the first scientific method to assess attachment, called the strange situation. The results of her assessments confirmed a three-pattern model. Staying with a secure vs insecure framework, Ainsworth identified one secure pattern and two completely different insecure patterns. She labeled these with the letters A, B, C, with B representing the secure pattern.

Ainsworth's graduate students, including Mary Main and Patricia "Pat" Crittenden, made important developments to attachment science and theory. Both Main and Crittenden realized that the criteria Ainsworth was using did not allow for the attachment classification of a significant number of children. In the 1970s Main initially described most of this group as being disorganized, unable to organize an attachment strategy to help them meet their attachment system needs for safety. Main and Solomon later redefined disorganized attachment. Decades of research were dedicated to exploring the concept of disorganized attachment, but ultimately the concept proved almost completely unhelpful.

Crittenden studied under Ainsworth in the 1980s, ten years after Main. Because Crittenden initially focused on danger and saw the attachment system as promoting survival, she rejected the idea that a significant portion of children could fail to organize an attachment strategy to survive. Thus, she looked for other explanations about the apparent shortcomings in Ainsworth's initial model. As she did, she expanded the A, B, C patterns of attachment, and with the help of Andrea Landini they organized the patterns into what eventually became the DMM.

She also started her work after John Bowlby wrote the third book in his Attachment and Loss trilogy in 1980, Loss: Sadness and Depression. In Chapter 4 of that book, Bowlby outlined his view that attachment was intimately connected with information processing and the defensive exclusion of information to survive psychological danger. He argued that common psychological defense mechanisms were actually efforts to keep certain types of unwanted information out of one's mind during experiences and while considering issues and making decisions. Crittenden centered her work on how humans develop self-protective strategies and patterns of information processing in the context of danger.

In a sense, Crittenden began where Bowlby and Ainsworth left off. While moving away from some of the older concepts such as secure vs insecure and internal working models, she kept and refined the three-pattern model. The DMM continues to evolve and Fonagy describes it as ″the most clinically sophisticated model that attachment theory has to offer at the present time.″

== DMM-attachment ==
=== Basic definition of DMM-attachment ===
Attachment describes a system which involves a person's need to be protected from danger, and comforted especially after exposure to danger, and a relationship with an attachment figure who can provide protection from danger and comfort. As a system centered on survival, it also involves a person's need to increase reproductive opportunities and protect progeny.

Particularly when the attachment system involves a caregiver and child, the relational interactions associated with attachment needs shapes neural development and emotional and biological regulation processes in children. Thus, a child's relational environment, and parenting environment, has lifelong impacts.

An attachment figure for children may be one or both parents or other close caregiver, and for adults a romantic partner. An attachment figure is someone to whom a person is most likely to turn to under stress. That person may be a stronger, wiser, and trusted (even if not always safe or protective) person. An attachment-influencing relationship has the qualities of being affectively charged and involving the regulation or dysregulation of emotions. It also involves protecting a person from being forced to handle something outside their developmental ability (their zone of proximal development). An optimal attachment figure is sensitively attuned and responsive to the person's communications and needs and encourages curiosity and the exploration of new information.

Helping professionals, clergy, lawyers, probation officers, teachers, club leaders, friends and other people may function as an auxiliary attachment figure, or transitional attachment figure (TAF), to help people get through a difficult experience.

Danger can be objective (deep water, cliff edges, snakes) or subjective and relevant to only particular attachment patterns. For people who tend to use self-protective A-strategies, danger can include aggressive or dismissive parental responses, not doing the right thing, doing the wrong thing, expressing feelings especially if negative, relying on others to meet needs, and being in conflict. For people who tend to use self-protective C-strategies, danger can include an inconsistent or lack of parental response, not expressing and satisfying feelings especially if negative, following someone else's rules which don't satisfy feelings, compromising, relying on the self to meet needs, and not being in conflict or a struggle.

=== DMM contributions to the development of attachment theory ===
Crittenden and colleagues have advanced attachment knowledge in numerous ways. Crittenden and Landini describe many of these in their 2011 book Assessing Adult Attachment: A Dynamic-Maturational Approach to Discourse Analysis.

Focus on danger: The DMM focus on danger, rather than safety, orients an understanding of the attachment system in a way that is practical and useful for understanding response to threat and conflict. Bowlby focused on danger, but other subsequent models changed the focus to safety. The DMM focus on danger is consistent with other biopsychosocial models, such as the polyvagal theory which describes opposing nervous system features which activate in contexts of safety or danger.

Clarification of terminology: The DMM avoids older attachment terms such as secure vs insecure, attachment categories and measures, attachment disorders, disorganized attachment, internal working models, and top level terms such as avoidant and ambivalent. It uses terms such as pathways of development instead of developmental trajectories.

Development of lifespan attachment assessments: Crittenden and colleagues developed a comprehensive lifespan set of attachment assessments (described below), and enhanced existing assessments. Since theory leads scientific inquiry, and scientific findings add to theory, DMM assessments contributed to more detailed theory.

Maturational and changeable: DMM-attachment recognizes that humans are able to utilize more and more sophisticated self-protective attachment strategies as they age. Hence, attachment patterns can become increasingly complex with age. Infants begin with instinctive strategies such as smiling and reaching, and through behavioral learning develop an increasing array of ways to gain protection from danger from their caregivers. Thought and communication patterns are eventually added to a person's available strategies. People can change their primary strategy, add additional strategies, and reorganize from an A-C strategy to a B strategy.

Strategies: Strategies are the ways people get their needs met. Self-protective strategies are not diagnoses or mental health disorders. The strategies may be quite functional in certain types of relationships, and dysfunctional in other relationships if not adjusted. Selecting a specific response in a specific situation is not necessarily dictated by a strategy preference, it is situation and context driven, which Crittenden describes as a dispositional representation (DR). Crittenden expanded and more finely defined attachment strategies (or patterns), as noted below.

Detailed strategies: The DMM described known behaviors with more specificity, identified new attachment behaviors, and new attachment patterns.

- Compulsive compliance was first identified in 1988, and was added into the DMM patterns as A4 in 1992. It describes a child's adaptation to a harsh or controlling parent by learning to inhibit behavior disagreeable to the parent and compulsively engaging in behaviors which please the parent, but may be boring or harmful to the child.
- False positive affect (FPA) describes the use of inappropriate positive affect when negative affect would be more appropriate. An example is overbright smiling or laughing in the context of present danger or while experiencing pain. Victoria Climbié is considered a good case example. At age eight she was murdered by caregiver abuse and neglect. Her physical scars and other signs of abuse were seen by multiple professionals and agencies, including doctors, nurses, social workers, and clergy, who all failed to recognize the extreme danger she was in. At the same time, she was described by a number of people as happy, friendly, "twirling up and down the ward", "had the most beautiful smile that lit up the room", and "you could beat her and she wouldn't cry... she could take the beatings and pain like anything." In the ABC+D model, this behavior is theorized as a marker of disorganized attachment.
- Shame is identified by adult attachment interviews (below) conducted with the DMM method as a particularly sensitive emotion in A-patterns. Shame is defined as having an intrapersonal quality involving the fear of failing to meet an external standard, often too high a standard, set by others, along with self-blame and over-attribution of responsibility.

Adaptive and strategic function of behavior: Attachment behaviors and communication styles are developed through adaptation to danger and function to promote survival in a given relationship.

Every DMM-attachment pattern involves both adaptive and maladaptive behaviors. A person using B3 "balanced" strategies may fail to predict danger or access a self-protective strategy and end up being harmed. A person using A-strategies may focus on cooperating and avoiding conflict to the exclusion of protecting their children or financial interests. A person using C-strategies may focus on satisfying their own feelings to the exclusion of cooperation and conflict resolution even to the detriment of their children or financial interests.

Individual behaviors can be seen in all attachment strategies, but serve different functions. For example, bright smiling can serve several self-protective purposes. In A-strategies it can function to hide pain and take attention away from in-the-moment negative experiences. In C-strategies it can function to disarm prior or following aggression.

Dimensional: Strategies are described as dimensional rather than categorical. As demonstrated on the DMM circumplex, they range from exposing people to more and more risk (moving down the outside of the circumplex), and more or more intensity (moving from the center of the circumplex to the outer rim). The DMM eschews the terms secure and insecure, although it is used in various DMM literature.

=== DMM foundations and support ===
The DMM has and continues to incorporate all relevant disciplines. It incorporates all the disciplines Bowlby utilized, including psychoanalytic, ethology, systems psychology, evolutionary biology, cognitive information processing, and cognitive neurosciences. It incorporates all the disciplines Ainsworth utilized, including naturalistic observation, and empirical grounding of attachment theory. DMM additions include genetics, epigenetics, neurobiology, sociology, developmental psychology, Piaget's theory of cognitive development, Erikson's stages of psychosocial development, behavioral learning theory, social learning theory, theory of mind, cognitive psychology, Vygotsky's zone of proximal development, Vygotsky and Bronfenbrenner's social ecological model, transactional theory, family systems theory, polyvagal theory, mindfulness theory, and functional somatic syndrome theory.

The DMM is supported by the International Association for the Study of Attachment (IASA). The Family Relations Institute (FRI) is the primary organization teaching DMM theory and assessments. The attachment studies programme at University of Roehampton, U.K., includes the DMM and some of its assessments, as does the Barnard Center for Infant Mental Health and Development at the University of Washington in Seattle.

IASA maintains a list of publications describing the DMM. There are over 500 such publications.

== DMM attachment patterns ==
DMM attachment patterns can be viewed several different ways.

In its simplest form, the DMM offers a 3-part model using Ainsworth's basic A, B, C patterns.

Some populations of clients tend to be heavily oriented to either a cognitive or affective information processing pattern, such as clinical populations. In these contexts, the DMM offers a basic 2-part model.

The DMM circumplex graphically depicts 22 adult patterns. There are some sub-patterns, such as A3- (compulsive attending) and A4- (compulsive performance), and A and C patterns can be combined, such as A4/C5-6 or A3-4/C2. In the table below, the cognitive A and affective C-patterns are arranged from the middle out, where the patterns in the middle (B1-5, A1-2 and C1-2) represent the least at risk patterns (lower number in the classification) to most at risk (higher number). The B1-2 patterns are somewhat cognitively organized, the B4-5 patterns are somewhat affectively organized. The A1-2 and C1-2 patterns are not considered "insecure," rather normal strategies involving only slight transformations of information.

DMM self-protective strategies
| Strategy | DMM Strategy label | Strategy | DMM strategy label |
|---|---|---|---|
| A7 | Delusional idealizing | A8 | Externally assembled self (no self) |
| A5 | Compulsive promiscuity (social or sexual) | A6 | Compulsive self-reliance (social or isolated) |
| A3 | Compulsive caregiving | A4 | Compulsive compliance |
| A1 | Inhibited/idealizing | A2 | Socially facile/distancing (distal) |
| B1 | Distanced from the past | B2 | Accepting |
| B3 | Comfortably balanced (A and C strategies functionally balanced) | | |
| B5 | Complaining acceptance | B4 | Sentimental |
| C1 | Threateningly angry | C2 | Disarmingly desirous of comfort |
| C3 | Aggressively angry | C4 | Feigned helpless |
| C5 | Punitively angry and obsessed with revenge | C6 | Seductive and obsessed with rescue |
| C7 | Menacing | C8 | Paranoid |
| AC or A/C | Uncomfortably balanced, blended AC patterns or alternating A/C (dysfunctionally balanced) | | |

The DMM can be used as a 4-part model (or a multi-part model depending on its application), as demonstrated in the left and right columns in the table above. The odd-numbered strategies share elements in common which differ from the even-numbered strategies.

Odd-numbered A-patterns (A1-7) tend to focus on idealizing others while even-numbered A-patterns (A2-8) tend to focus on negating the self. In relations with important authorities, the higher odd-numbered A-patterns can involve compulsive caretaking and the even-numbered A-patterns compulsive compliance.

C-patterns organize self-protective strategies around feelings. Odd-numbered C-patterns focus on feelings of anger, increasing in intensity in the higher numbers. Even-numbered patterns focus on desire for comfort and fear, with increasing intensity of fear in the higher numbers. Higher C-odd patterns can involve obsessive coercion. Higher C-even patterns can involve increasing amounts of rage which may escape notice because of simultaneous exaggeration of innocence and vulnerability.

The odd-even split can also be seen from diagonal corners to reflect the opposite functioning of similar elements. The odd-numbered A-strategies in the upper left quadrant (A1-7) all involve some sort of tendency to focus care outward to the needs of others, which differs from the C2-8 patterns which tend to focus care inward to the emotions of the self. The even-numbered A-patterns (A2-8) patterns all involve some sort of tendency to express anger inward to the self, whereas the C1-7 patterns tend to express anger outward toward objects or others.

As noted above, the self-protective strategy patterns are adaptive, and dimensional rather than categorical. For example, a person may primarily utilize C1 strategies to manage danger, but on occasion use higher forms of C strategies such as C3, C4, or C5. This could result from exposure to higher forms of danger or be a response to unresolved trauma or loss.

All the attachment strategies can be impacted by a variety of additional factors, such as unresolved trauma, unresolved loss, depression, and family triangulation.

== Information processing and transformation ==
The DMM is fundamentally an information processing model, and self-protective attachment strategies develop around two primary sources of information available to humans: cognitive and affective.

Cognitive information is described as temporally sequenced, as illustrated with "if/then" statements. Affective information is described as being emotionally intense experiences. Attachment A-strategies tend to emphasize cognitive information and de-emphasize or exclude affective information. Attachment C-strategies do the opposite, emphasizing affective information and de-emphasizing or excluding cognitive information. Attachment B-strategies tend to blend both types of information as they process experiences in the world, although they can emphasize one or the other.

Crittenden describes information processing as involving four main steps:

1. Perceive the information, or not;
2. Interpret the information in some way, or not;
3. Select response of some sort, or not; and
4. Implement behavior of some sort, or not.

An example involves a child who is feeling a strong emotion:

1. Will the parent perceive their child's emotion?
2. If so, will they interpret it as the child needing help to process the emotion, or as the child being weak, overly-needy, or interrupting what they are doing?
3. Will the parent consider selecting a response, and if so which one?
4. Will the parent implement a response, or get distracted or decide to ignore their child's emotional experience?

=== Transformation of information ===
At each stage of information processing, information is transformed as it is converted from what it is, to a representation of what it is in the mind. A test result, a smile, and divorce papers, come to mean something in the mind through a neural process. The DMM currently identifies seven ways information can be transformed, each of which represents increased transformation: true, erroneous, distorted, omitted, falsified, denied, delusional.

A parent's processing of information about a child's strong negative emotion, continuing with that example, could be seen as:

1. True, and provide information which helps the parent ease the child's distress.
2. Erroneous, over- or under-interpreted, such that a parental response might be non-productive, such as giving too much or not enough attention to the distress.
3. Distorted, where some portion of the information is emphasized and the other de-emphasized, such as acknowledging the distress but emphasizing that it will go away on its own when it won't easily do so.
4. Omitted, so that some portion of the information is discarded, such as the reason for the distress.
5. Falsified, where the emotion is changed from one thing to another, such as distressed to hungry.
6. Denied, where the emotion is actively avoided.
7. Delusional, where new and incorrect information is created to replace the true information, such as thinking the child is laughing or is signaling a desire to play.

=== Memory systems ===
DMM assessments look for memory system function as described by memory researchers such as Endel Tulving and Daniel Schacter. Eight memory systems assessed by the DMM method are body talk, somatic, procedural, semantic, imaged, connotative, episodic, and reflective integration.

As with information processing, attachment patterns can involve the use, or bias of, various memory systems as sources of information. Attachment A-strategies tend to utilize information from procedural and semantic memory systems, and de-emphasize or exclude information from imaged and connotative systems. Attachment C-strategies do the opposite and emphasize information from imaged and connotative systems and de-emphasize or exclude information from procedural and semantic systems. Attachment B-strategies tend to have better access to all memory systems. Each attachment pattern has its own strength in various circumstances where different memory systems may be advantageous.

== DMM attachment assessments ==
Attachment measures, or assessments, assess the self-protective strategy of a person. In infancy and early childhood, it is assessed with respect to specific attachment figures whereas beginning in the school years a generalized strategy is assessed. Assessments generally use anthropological observation, a video-recorded interaction, picture cards, or an audio-recorded interview. In observed assessments behavior is assessed, and with interviews the discourse, or manner of speech, is primarily assessed. Crittenden and others have modified existing attachment assessments and developed others to create a range of DMM assessments intended to cover the lifespan. Assessments generally assess individuals, caregivers (usually parents) and/or children, and can assess non-primary caregivers such as close grandparents and foster parents. DMM assessments can be used for research, clinically, forensically, and personally.

Some DMM assessments are considered valid and reliable, and others are still in a development and validation phase which generally takes at least 10 years. IASA considers an assessment valid and reliable if it has a minimum of five published studies supporting it, including studies which the creator of the assessment did not author, and address several of the following:

- Concurrent validity
- Longitudinal validity
- Face validity
- Predictive validity
- Clinical utility

IASA's Family Court Protocol requires that assessments in a development phase should not be used forensically, particularly in court cases where children and parents could lose access to each other. IASA also argues that individual assessments are only reliable if the assessor (coder) is qualified by having passed a standardized reliability test and maintained their qualification.

=== Infant Care-Index (ICI) ===
The ICI consists of a 3-minute interaction of a caregiver and child (a 2-person, or dyadic, relationship) aged from birth to 15 months. The ICI assesses interaction, not attachment (which does not develop until 9–11 months of age). The ICI assesses a dyad's interpersonal functioning under non-threatening play conditions and clusters dyads as sensitive to good enough, at mild risk of parenting difficulties, or at high risk of parenting difficulties, including infant neglect and maltreatment. It was developed by Crittenden with input from Ainsworth and Bowlby. The ICI is considered a valid and reliable assessment and has more than 60 published studies.

=== Strange Situation Procedure (SSP) ===
The SSP is the classic assessment of attachment developed by Ainsworth. Almost all other assessments of attachment are validated against it. The SSP consists of eight episodes over 21–23 minutes. Unlike the ICI which assesses only dyadic synchrony under the favorable condition of play, the SSP uses threat to elicit the infant's pattern of attachment. Threat, or relationship danger, comes in several forms such as the stranger coming into the observation room with parent and child (episode 3), the parent leaving the child in the room with the stranger (episode 4), the parent later leaving the child in the room alone (episode 6), and the stranger re-entering the room without the parent (episode 7). The parent returns and the stranger leaves in the eighth and final episode. The infant's behavior on the parent's return is the primary basis for classification into one of three major strategies, labeled A, B, and C.

The SSP was developed for 11-month-old infants. It has been used for older infants, but, as infants age, their tolerance for separation increases and the behavioral markers defined by Ainsworth fit less well, resulting in higher proportions of infants classified as secure, including maltreated infants. In the DMM, this problem was resolved by limiting the age range to 11–15 months, and developing, with Ainsworth's assistance, an alternating A/C classification and pre-compulsive and pre-coercive patterns. These include A1-2 or C1-2 patterns, and clear evidence for A+ or C+ patterns (which involves more intense use of self-protective strategies). These expansions of the Ainsworth categories have been associated with maltreated infants and infants of depressed mothers.

=== Preschool Assessment of Attachment (PAA) ===
The PAA is a version of Mary Ainsworth's Strange Situation Procedure (SSP), adapted to 2–5-year-old children. It assesses the child's self-protective strategies used with the adult involved in the assessment. It also uses a video recorded 8-segment process over a structured 21–23 minute adult-child interaction. The PAA is valid and reliable, with more than 30 studies using it.

=== School-age Assessment of Attachment (SAA) ===
The SAA involves an audio recorded interview which is transcribed and analyzed with discourse analysis techniques, for children aged 6–13 years. In the assessment, a child is given story cards which represent increasing levels of danger, and they are asked to make up a story that describes what is depicted on the card, and then, if they had any similar experience in their life, asked a series of exploratory questions. It assesses the child's generalized attachment pattern, self-protective strategies, pattern of information processing, level and type of risk, and possible unresolved trauma and loss. It was initially developed in 1997 by Crittenden, has been tested in eight research studies, and is considered to provide discriminate validity. The SAA was the subject of a special section of Clinical Child Psychology and Psychiatry in July 2017.

=== Adult Attachment Interview (AAI) ===
The AAI is considered one of the most comprehensive attachment assessments, and is well validated. It was initially created by Carol George and Nancy Kaplan in, and later developed with Mary Main in 1985. Crittenden and Landini slightly modified it with DMM theory in 2011. It assesses self-protective attachment strategies, patterns of information processing, a possible unresolved trauma and loss which distort behavior and information processing, an over-riding condition which causes information distortion such as depression and triangulation in childhood, memory system usage, and reflective function. The assessment involves asking a person a series of structured questions, transcribing the audio recording, and applying a complex set of discourse analysis techniques. The interview takes 60–90 minutes, and it can take hours or days to analyze. Learning to code reliably generally takes several years.

The coding manual for the DMM-AAI is Assessing Adult Attachment: A Dynamic-Maturational Approach to Discourse Analysis (2011) and is publicly available.

=== DMM Assessments undergoing the validation process ===
The following assessments have not been validated with three or more studies and are not considered by IASA to be acceptable for use forensically under their Family Court Protocol.

==== Toddler Care-Index (TCI) ====
The TCI video records a 5-minute interaction of a caregiver and child aged from 15 to 72 months. It assesses the general attachment characteristics of a specific dyad, such as mother and child or father and child. The TCI is considered a useful assessment, but has not been validated by research. It was developed by Crittenden.

==== Transition to Adulthood Attachment Interview (TAAI) ====
The TAAI is a modified version of the AAI for adolescents aged about 14–25 years old. It was modified from the AAI by Crittenden in 2005 and 2020.

==== Meaning of the Child interview (MotC) ====
The MotC is an interview of a parent which is transcribed and assessed with discourse analysis techniques similar to the AAI. The MotC assesses a parent's general pattern of caregiving, sensitivity and level of responsiveness to their child, the degree and forms of control a parent may utilize, and self-reflective function (mentalization). It examines how caregiving is shaped by a parent's pattern of attachment and need for self protection. In a validation study, the way parents talked about their children in the MotC was found to predict how they behaved with their child in a CARE-Index video. The MotC has also been used to research the parent–child relationships of parent of autistic children. It was developed by Ben Grey and Steve Farnfield in 2011, and uses DMM theory and methods.

==== Child Attachment and Play Assessment (CAPA) ====
The CAPA assesses the attachment and exploration systems of children aged 7–11. It uses an interview process similar to the SAA. The CAPA currently has one published validation study demonstrating convergence with other attachment procedures. It was developed by Steve Farnfield, and uses DMM theory and methods.

== Applications ==
=== DMM Integrative Treatment ===
DMM concepts have been used to develop DMM specific treatment interventions for mental health, family, and criminal problems. The DMM has been applied to models of psychotherapy, attachment narrative therapy, family therapy, and criminal behavior.

DMM integrative treatment can include a focus on how information is processed and transformed, especially in response to danger. It can include DMM concepts such as adaptations to relational danger (for both individuals and families), developmental processes and learned patterns of information processing.

DMM Integrative treatment involves five principles;

1. Define problems in terms of response to danger.
2. The professional acts as a transitional attachment figure.
3. Explore the family's past and present responses to danger.
4. Work progressively and recursively with the family.
5. Practice reflective integration with the client as a form of teaching reflective integration.

DMM Family Functional Formulation (DMM FFF) describes a comprehensive approach to a wide array of mental health problems. Crittenden and colleagues argue that psychological diagnosis and systems psychology have proven substantially ineffective in treating a wide array of mental health problems. A clinical formulation, which is a broad-based analysis and explanation of the problem, is an alternative approach. Crittenden argues the DMM can contribute to a more effective case formulation when the entire family is consulted and understood using DMM assessments.

=== Law ===
The DMM and its methods are useful for discourse and argument analysis, client counseling, understanding shortcomings in client and witness memory recall, forensic purposes, criminal justice, probation, and conflict management. At its heart, attachment theory describes the conflict of contradictory information and needs, and information processing and decision making using biased information.

Because information processing involves the defensive exclusion and inclusion of information, it can affect how people make decisions and communicate. The DMM-AAI discourse analysis method is specifically designed to "understand the meanings behind unclear communication, distorted communication and dysfunctional behavior".

DMM attachment assessments can be used in court cases and forensically if done by a trained and reliable coder. The IASA Family Court Protocol is designed to promote attachment information in a way that is as comprehensive and reliable as attachment assessments can allow, and which also supplements other information about individuals, family members, and family systems. FRI's Family Functional Formula is a comprehensive and valuable, if expensive, method to assess a family system.

DMM perspectives on attachment and information processing are useful for understanding neglectful and harmful parenting, domestic violence and criminal behavior.

=== Medicine – somatic symptoms ===
Kozlowska argues that functional somatic symptoms are impacted by disrupted or chronically challenged attachment relationships. The DMM assessment method, especially for children, specifically identifies and assesses nonverbal communications and somatic expressions. Two large studies, which Kozlowska relied on, found a strong association between low quality attachment relationships and functional somatic symptoms later in life. Kozlowska's own research showed children with functional neurological disorders (FND) almost universally used higher attachment strategies (A3-4, A5-6, C3-4, and C5-6).

=== Occupational therapy ===
Occupational therapists can apply the DMM directly, and in conjunction with other modalities. Kozlowska describes incorporating occupational therapy with pediatric medicine, hypnosis, physiotherapy, neurology, and DMM-Attachment theory. Occupational therapists can increase a child's day-to-day functioning and manage emotional arousal. They can also address Functional Neurological Disorder (FND), which she found almost always involved children's use of higher DMM self-protective strategies. DMM theory helps integrate different modalities around the concepts of protection from danger, the impact of interpersonal relationships and family environments, and the use of transitional attachment figures.

Meredith, using non-DMM attachment assessments designed for research rather than clinical purposes, has found associations between pain, sensory processing and distress and adult attachment patterns. She argues that occupational therapists are in a good, if not unique position to utilize attachment theory to guide interventions. Kozlowska uses DMM theory to specifically guide assessment and intervention.

In a University of Roehampton dissertation paper, Gounaridis describes a successful pilot project combining a sensory integration approach, a DMM-attachment assessment (CAPA), and vagal tone measurements as described by the polyvagal theory.

In an Arizona State University dissertation paper, Taggart described how occupational therapists can use Éadaoin Bhreathnach's Sensory Attachment Intervention (SAI) approach, which is informed by the DMM, together with trauma and polyvagal theory informed perspectives, to help children improve emotional expression.

=== Psychotherapy ===
The DMM is not necessarily a therapy model, rather it provides a framework to better understand clients, improve communication, and assist with selecting appropriate therapy models. It can help therapists:

- Assess or formulate the client's self-protective attachment strategies;
- Identify response to dangers from the past and in the present;
- Focus the therapeutic alliance around the concept of being a transitional attachment figure;
- Determine how the client functions interpersonally (including with the therapist);
- Identify a client's patterns of information processing and information bias;
- Identify failures of self-protective strategies which lead to psychological and/or somatic problems;
- Be mindful to practice reflective integration for its own value and for modeling;
- Help clients build a coherent narrative of their experiences.

Attachment Centred Therapy (ACT) provides a model for adult psychotherapy. It uses the DMM, the DMM-AAI, and incorporates other models such as an attachment-based modification of Maslow's hierarchy of needs and rational emotive behavior therapy. ACT seeks to help patients reprogram and reorganize their unconscious mind, reorganize their attachment strategies, and create healthier narratives about difficult life experiences.

For therapists using a family systems approach, it can help identify self-protective strategies between the parents, between each child and parent, and between children, to provide more insight into the functioning of the family system. It can help therapists avoid blame and reframe negative emotions to honesty and more appropriate contexts. It can help a therapist move a client's strong negative emotions such as anger and a desire for revenge to softer and more manageable emotions such as sadness and vulnerability. Play therapy, the polyvagal theory, and DMM theory were combined in Hadiprodjo's doctoral thesis. Combining the DMM with the Assessment of Parent-Child Interactions (ACPI, a music theory-based assessment), can allow the application of music theory to understand family attunement and nonverbal communication in the context of self-relevant dangers within a family context. The DMM has been used in a public service context, and informs therapists how to be a safe base and improve the therapeutic alliance.

The DMM provides insight into various mental health issues, such as working with emotions, adolescent challenges, trauma and neurobiological impacts, PTSD, ADHD, autism, borderline personality disorder, avoidant personality disorder, eating disorders, conversion disorders, somatic/factitious/fabricated illnesses, shutdown states in children, drug addiction, psychopathy, child abuse, sex abuse, effects of institutionalization, and depression. It offers an alternate view of personality disorders.

=== Research ===
The DMM theory and assessment methods are useful for conducting attachment assessments. Because there are DMM assessments to cover the lifespan, they can be used to assess an individual and a family system. The DMM approach appears to provide more precise results with populations of people whose childhood involved adverse childhood experiences or parents who consistently used cold, inconsistent, harsh or controlling parenting techniques or engaged in parental conflict or failed to protect or comfort their children. It appears that between the DMM and Berkeley assessment methods, the DMM method can better delineate between secure and insecure attachment classifications, and also the quantity of A, C, and mixed AC patterns. This is likely because the DMM is focused on a person's response to danger and fear, and describes the attachment system's primary purpose as being to organize self-protective responses.

== Comparison to other attachment models ==
Ainsworth developed the ABC model in the 1960s and 1970s. It was the foundation for the ABC+D (sometimes called Berkeley) model and the DMM.

The newer ABC+D and DMM models both describe the attachment system, use Ainsworth's basic ABC patterns, and use the SSP and AAI attachment assessments. Both models reject the single-person focus of psychiatric models such as the DSM and ICD, instead focusing on how a parent-child (dyadic) relationship affects each person, and that childhood attachment patterns represent a child's best attempt to deal with the caregiving environment. Both find the most effective attachment-informed interventions in family problems is to focus on improving sensitivity of the child's primary caretaker. Both are based on principles of human development.

Ainsworth's ABC model ultimately described 9 subcategories, A1, A2, B1, B2, B3, B4, B5, C1, and C2. The newer models went on to identify additional basic subcategories, 24 in the adult version of the ABC+D model and 29 in the DMM, and each describe additional AC combinations.

While they both describe the effect of the attachment system on information processing and memory function, and both describe the impacts of trauma and loss, the DMM provides more focus and detail on these elements. The DMM utilizes more memory systems and considers more types of trauma. In the ABC+D model meaning is assigned to behavior, whereas the DMM looks for the function of behavior to define its meaning.

The ABC+D model has historically focused on safety, attachment security vs insecurity, is categorical, describes linear developmental trajectories, describes attachment with different concepts and terms for children and adults, and uses Bowlby's "internal working model" concept. The DMM is focused on danger, focuses on risk instead of security-insecurity, is dimensional, describes potentially branching developmental pathways, describes the maturational development of self-protective strategies, and describes neurobiological systems and processes.

Landa and Duschinsky describe the historical development of both models to provide an explanation about why and how they differ. The ABC+D model initially relied on normative (average) research populations. Initial DMM research utilized both normative and maltreated populations, so it had a richer data set to work from. Each model also makes different foundational assumptions. The DMM (and others) assumes, as did Bowlby and Ainsworth, that a primary purpose of the attachment system for children is to maintain the attachment figure's availability. In the ABC+D model, as defined by Mary Main and Judith Solomon, the purpose is to maintain proximity. (Not all attachment theorists who use the ABC+D model use the same definitions as Mary Main. Increasingly, they use terms and definitions identical, or nearly so, to Crittenden's.) While the words availability and proximity may seem similar, they are not and they lead to significant differences in their robustness and application.

The DMM rejects the concept of disorganized attachment, instead arguing that people can organize a response to almost all forms of danger, even if the response is increased aggression or ignoring physical and psychological pain. Granqvist and 42 other attachment experts, including Mary Main, agreed that the concept of disorganized attachment, as understood in 2017, has little or no utility, and may not be used clinically or forensically.

The ABC+D model was widely accepted by the research community from about 1990–2017, although Main was calling for caution in the use of disorganized attachment in clinical and forensic settings by at least 2011. In 2018 van IJzendoorn et al. pointed out the replication crisis of ABC+D-based attachment assessments, and called for the ABC+D attachment community to revisit its foundations.

== Criticisms ==
After Granqvist, and 42 other authors (2017), clearly identified the limits and misapplication of the disorganized attachment category, Van IJzendoorn, et al., and Crittenden and Spieker exchanged a series of comments and criticisms about the ABC+D and DMM attachment models in the November/December 2018 issue of Infant Mental Health Journal. Van IJzendoorn criticized the DMM for having too many classifications, 29 basic patterns, compared to the ABC+D model (which has 24). While conceding that assessments using the ABC+D attachment model cannot be used forensically, he argued neither could DMM assessments since they did not meet the "beyond a reasonable doubt" standard required in court. However, "more likely than not" is the correct standard in civil (non-criminal) court cases. Van IJzendoorn argued DMM assessments lack validity as much as ABC+D assessments do, which Crittenden (and others) dispute. Van IJzendoorn found fault with Crittenden's position that the DMM is still developing. Crittenden responded that a complex and transdisciplinary model of human development must always continue to add new information and develop.

Forslund and 68 other authors subsequently discussed the use of attachment assessments in court proceedings. They described limitations and the appropriate use of assessments using the ABC+D model. Some authors argued they could never be used in court proceedings, and some argued they could. However, the article, while making side references to Crittenden, did not clarify that it was only addressing the problems of assessments using the ABC+D model.

Other people echo Van IJzendoorn's point about complexity in terms of becoming a reliable coder and being able to use a DMM-assessment to testify forensically about a particular person's self-protective strategies in a particular context, or for a family assessment using the DMM Family Functional Formulation method. The PAA and SAA can take a year or more to learn. The AAI can take several years. In fact, there are few people in the world who can use DMM-assessments forensically, particularly under the requirements of IASA's Family Court Protocol. (Neither IASA nor FRI list any available forensic coders on their websites as of November 2021.)

David Pocock found the DMM useful, and powerful, and at the same raising the risk of reductionism and reification. The DMM attempts to make it clear that people are not reduced to "a C3" or "an A4", instead they are described as using strategies from those patterns. Reification involves making something abstract concrete, turning an attachment strategy used in one situation into what completely defines the person. He echoes common concerns that attachment, and the DMM in particular, is such a powerful model it is potentially easy to fall into the use of counterproductive shortcuts.

== Bibliography ==
=== Introductory reading materials ===
- Hopton, Sarah (2025), Understanding attachment using DMM, counselling-directory.org.uk.
- Atkins, Louise, (2020), Why Attachment Matters: Dynamic Maturational Model (DMM) of attachment theory, medium.com.
- Crittenden, Patricia M. (2002), Attachment, information processing, and psychiatric disorder, World Psychiatry, 1:2.
- Crittenden, Patricia. M. (2006). A dynamic-maturational model of attachment. Australian and New Zealand Journal of Family Therapy, 27, 105–115.
- Farnfield, Steve, Holmes, Paul (2014). The Routledge Handbook of Attachment: Assessment. London: Routledge.
- Hautamäki, Airi (Ed.), (2014). The Dynamic-Maturational Model of Attachment and Adaptation – Theory and Practice. University of Helsinki, SSKH, Skrifter, 37.
- Purnell, C. (2010). Childhood trauma and adult attachment, Healthcare Counselling and Psychotherapy Journal, 10, 1–7.
- Spieker, Susan J. and Crittenden, Patricia M. (2018), Can attachment inform decision making in child protection and forensic settings?. Infant Mental Health Journal, 39: 625–641. doi:10.1002/imhj.21746

=== Advanced reading materials ===
- Baldoni, Franco, Minghetti, Mattia, Craparo, Giuseppe, Facondini, Elisa, Cena, Loredana, & Schimmenti, Adriano (2018). Comparing Main, Goldwyn, and Hesse (Berkeley) and Crittenden (DMM) coding systems for classifying Adult Attachment Interview transcripts: an empirical report, Attachment and Human Development, 20:4, 423–438, DOI: 10.1080/14616734.2017.1421979.
- Crittenden, Patricia M. (2016). Raising parents: Attachment, representation, and treatment, 2nd edition. London: Routledge.
- Crittenden, Patricia M., Dallos, Rudi, Landini, Andrea, & Kozlowska, Kasia (2014). Attachment and family therapy. London: Open University Press.
- Crittenden, Patricia M., & Landini, Andrea (2011). Assessing Adult Attachment: A Dynamic-Maturational Method of Discourse Analysis. New York: Norton.
- Crittenden, Patricia M. & Newman, Louise (2010). Comparing models of borderline personality disorder: Mothers' experience, self-protective strategies, and dispositional representations. Clinical Child Psychology and Psychiatry, 15,433-452.
- Crittenden, Patricia M., Robson, Katrina, Tooby, Alison, & Fleming, Charles (2017), Are mothers' protective attachment strategies related to their children's strategies? Clinical Child Psychology and Psychiatry, 22:3, 358-377 (Note: this article uses three DMM attachment assessments, the PAA, SAA, and AAI, and offers a comprehensive and longitudinal review of attachment strategies in mother-child pairs.)
- Kozlowska, Kasia; Scher, Stephen; Helgeland, Helene (2020). Functional Somatic Symptoms in Children and Adolescents: A Stress-System Approach to Assessment and Treatment, Palgrave Macmillan. PDF and Kindle versions available free as open access textbook.
- Landa, Sophie & Duschinsky, Robbie (2013) Letters from Ainsworth: Contesting the "Organization" of Attachment. Journal of the Canadian Academy of Child & Adolescent Psychiatry. 22, 172–177.
- Landa, Sophie, & Duschinsky, Robbie (2013). Crittenden's dynamic–maturational model of attachment and adaptation. Review of General Psychology, 17, 326–338. doi:10.1037/a0032102
- Strathearn, Lane, Fonagy, Peter, Amico, Janet A., & Montague, P. Read (2009). Adult attachment predicts mother's brain and peripheral oxytocin response to infant cues. Neuropsychopharmacology, 34, 2655–66.
