= Peter Hobson =

English academic

R. P. Hobson, or Peter Hobson, is a Professor of Developmental Psychopathology at University College London known for his work on autism and experimental child psychology. His research leads him to conclusions concerning the origins of consciousness, summarized in a book for the general reader, The Cradle of Thought.

The core of his analysis is that human minds are the outcome of a successful series of interactions between infant and caregiver(s). In this Hobson's research has built on foundations established by Colwyn Trevarthen from the mid-1970s onwards. Trevarthen identified distinct steps in pre-lingual infant development, Primary Intersubjectivity and Secondary Intersubjectivity, which endow the infant's developing mind/brain with the architecture necessary for the achievement of symbolic thought.

Hobson throws further light on this basic claim by examining what occurs in cases where, for genetic or environmental reasons, infants are denied the opportunity to investigate intersubjective relationships. To achieve a rare vantage point on human development without unethical experimentation, Hobson examines cases of autism, Down syndrome, congenital blindness and extreme social deprivation (for which statistically significant numbers of orphans rescued from Nicolae Ceauşescu's Romanian orphanages were available). The obstacles each of these circumstances placed in the way of normal infant-caregiver interaction are finely examined.

Hobson's argument constitutes a challenge to certain flavors of sociobiology and Evolutionary Psychology, in that it traces the conception of the human mind back to a 'cradle' of social interactions, without which consciousness in the full, human sense is unobtainable. On the other hand, Hobson demonstrates that a hard-wired emotional connection is crucial for an infant to start the process of intersubjective learning. The experience of having an emotion elicited by another human being, and eliciting emotional responses in others, is identified as the material out of which humans fashion their sense of self, other, object and symbol.

Hobson's thesis is of growing interest in Philosophy of Mind and related disciplines. Edward Skidelsky suggests that Hobson fatally overlooks the fact that people with autism learn to speak (see External Links, below). Others have understood Hobson to be blaming parents for autism, a charge explicitly rejected in The Cradle of Thought.

== Publications ==
- The Cradle of Thought 2002
- Cognitive and social factors in the development of infants with Down Syndrome. Down Syndrome Research and Practice. Moore DG, Oates JM, Hobson RP and Goodwin J. (2002)
- On engaging with people in early childhood: The case of congenital blindness. Clinical Child Psychology & Psychiatry. Sandler AM and Hobson RP (2002)
- Are infants with autism socially engaged? A study of retrospective parental reports. Journal of Autism and Developmental Disorders. Wimpory DC, Hobson RP, Williams JMG and Nash S. (2000)
- Imitation and identification in autism. Journal of Child Psychology & Psychiatry, 40: 649-659. Hobson RP and Lee A. (1999)
- Autism and Congenital Blindness. Journal of Autism and Developmental Disorders, 29: 45-56. Hobson RP and Lee A. (1999)
- Individual differences in young children's IQ: A social-developmental perspective. Journal of Child Psychology & Psychiatry, 40: 455-464. Crandell LE and Hobson RP (1999)
- Autism and the Development of Mind 1993

== See also ==
- Evolutionary psychology
  - Evolutionary developmental psychology
- Sociobiology
- Lev Vygotsky
