= Attachment measures =

Psychological technique

Attachment measures, or attachment assessments, are procedures used to assess the attachment system in children and adults. These procedures can assess patterns of attachment and individual self-protective strategies. Some assessments work across the several models of attachment and some are model-specific.

Many assessments allow children and adults' attachment strategies to be classified into three primary attachment pattern groups: B-pattern (autonomous, balanced, blended, secure), A-pattern (avoidant, dismissive, cognitive, insecure), and C-pattern (ambivalent, preoccupied, resistant, affective, insecure). In most models, each pattern group is further broken down into several sub-patterns. Some assessments can find additional information about an individual, such as unresolved trauma, depression, history of family triangulation, and lifespan changes in the attachment pattern. Some assessments specifically or additionally look for caregiving behaviors, as caregiving and attachment are considered two separate systems for organizing thoughts, feelings, and behavior. Some methods assess disorders of attachment or romantic attachment.

Attachment models are typically generated from the schools of developmental science or social psychology, although both emanate from the Bowlby-Ainsworth framework. Ainsworth's Strange Situation Procedure was the first formal attachment assessment, and is still in wide use. Each school, while having the same foundation, may be studying different phenomenon. Assessments are typically conducted by observing behavior in a structured setting, by analyzing the transcript of a structured interview using technical discourse analysis methods, or by self-reports from a questionnaire. Social psychology models primarily utilize self-reports.

Some attachment models, such as the Berkeley (or ABC+D) model, consider disorganized attachment to be a pattern or category. The D classification was thought to represent a breakdown in the attachment-caregiving partnership such that the child does not have an organized behavioral or representational strategy to achieve protection and care from the attachment figure. However, the disorganized concept has been determined to be invalid for people older than 20 months. Other models, such as the Dynamic-Maturational Model of Attachment and Adaptation (DMM), describe virtually all attachment behavior and patterns within (or in a combination of) the three primary A, B, C patterns. The DMM considers all attachment behavior to be an organized effort to adapt within a given caregiving environment for optimizing available caregiver protection and maximizing survival.

== Measures of attachment in infants ==
Attachment measures for infants rely on observing the infant with a caregiver, typically videotaped, either in a natural or contrived environment. Measures for older children, including toddlers, are listed in subsequent sections.

=== Strange Situation Procedure (SSP) ===
The Strange Situation procedure was formulated to observe attachment relationships between a caregiver and children between the age of nine and 18 months. It was developed by Mary Ainsworth, a developmental psychologist Originally it was devised to enable children to be classified into the attachment styles known as secure, anxious-avoidant and anxious-ambivalent. As research accumulated and atypical patterns of attachment became more apparent it was further developed by Main and Solomon in 1986 and 1990 to include the new category of disorganized/disoriented attachment.

In this procedure the child is observed playing for 20 minutes while caregivers and strangers enter and leave the room, recreating the flow of the familiar and unfamiliar presence in most children's lives. The situation varies in stressfulness and the child's responses are observed. The child experiences the following situations:

1. Mother (or other familiar caregiver) and baby enter room.
2. Mother sits quietly on a chair, responding if the infant seeks attention.
3. A stranger enters, talks to the mother then gradually approaches infant with a toy. The mother leaves the room.
4. The stranger leaves the infant playing unless he/she is inactive and then tries to interest the infant in toys. If the infant becomes distressed this episode is ended.
5. Mother enters and waits to see how the infant greets her. The stranger leaves quietly and the mother waits until the baby settles, and then she leaves again.
6. The infant is alone. This episode is curtailed if the infant appears to be distressed.
7. The stranger comes back and repeats episode 3.
8. The mother returns and the stranger goes. Reunion behaviour is noted and then the situation is ended.

Two aspects of the child's behaviour are observed:

- The amount of exploration (e.g. playing with new toys) the child engages in throughout, and
- The child's reactions to the departure and return of its caregiver.

Beginning in 1970, a series of expansions were added to Ainsworth's original patterns. They include the following: B4 (1970), A/C (1985) D/disorganized (1986), B5 (1988, 1992) A+, C+, and Depressed (1992, 2010). At later ages, additional categories have been described. Each of these patterns reflects a different kind of attachment relationship of the infant with the mother/caregiver. An infant may have a different pattern of attachment to each parent as well as to alternate caregivers. Pattern of attachment is thus not a part of the infant, but is characteristic of the protective and comforting quality of a specific relationship. These attachment patterns are associated with behavioral patterns and can help further predict a child's future personality.

=== Infant CARE-Index (ICI) ===
The Infant CARE-Index (ICI) is procedure that assesses risk in parent/infant relationships. It was developed by Patricia Crittenden early in the development of the Dynamic-Maturational Model of Attachment and Adaptation (DMM) and can be used from birth, that is before infant's attachment strategies are established, and up to 15 months of age. The ICI involves a 3 minute video recording of a typical play interaction between a caregiver and infant, without requiring a separation or other stressor.

The focus is on the dyadic synchrony, that is the extent to which adult sensitivity to infant signals result in infant cooperation in play. Lower synchrony is indicative of higher risk. In addition caregiver's interactions with the infant are assessed using three scales, sensitive controlling and unresponsive, and infant interactions are assessed from the perspective of their caregiver, using four scales, cooperative, compulsive, difficult and passive. The ICI does not conclude attachment strategies but it is highly correlated to the maternal scales in the infant Strange Situation assessment patterns of attachment. It can be used in screening, to identify levels of risk, and as a tool for clinical intervention and evaluation and has been used in numerous research projects. The ICI is a statistically valid and reliable assessment, and trained reliable coders can typically code an interaction in 15–20 minutes. (Tryphonopoulos, 2014)

The ICI is often used within the context of child welfare in Britain and the wider UK. It is also used as a developmental screening tool as a way to identify parents who may benefit from more support or specific interventions that support their ability to sensitively attune to their infant.

== Measures of attachment in toddlerhood and early-middle childhood ==
As the SSP is not suitable beyond 18 months of age, other measures have been developed for older ages groups, which include observational measures (in a controlled or naturalistic environment), representational methods and interview methods. Some are developed for research purposes whereas others have been developed for clinical use. Effective training of evaluators is essential, as some items to be assessed require interpretation reliability (e.g., child is "suddenly aggressive toward mother for no reason").

=== Controlled observational methods ===
==== Preschool strange situation ====
Although originally designed for 1-year-old children, Ainsworth’s strange situation has been adapted to measure the attachment and exploratory behavior of children between the ages of 2-4½ years-old. A fundamental feature of the strange situation is that the situation the child is placed in must elicit stress. If the strange situation fails to stress the child, it cannot serve as an adequate environment for the measurement of attachment. The preschool strange situation features several alterations to facilitate the creation of stress in older children. These modifications include a slightly longer separation, changes in the role and/or gender of the stranger, and changes in the instructions to the caregiver. Some versions of the preschool strange situations omit the stranger altogether, thus leaving the child alone in the room throughout both separations. The coding system used to interpret the attachment style expressed by the child has also been modified. Rather than focusing entirely on the expression of specific behaviors and emotions, the revised coding system assesses ways in which a variety of behaviors, such as talking, are organized to maintain and negotiate proximity and contact. Cassidy, Marvin and the MacArthur Working group published a version of the Strange Situation procedure designed for children within the age group of 3- to 4-years-old. In addition to categorizing a child’s attachment as secure, insecure/avoidant, insecure/ambivalent, and insecure/disorganized, the measure includes a seven-point avoidance scale and nine-point security scale.

==== Main & Cassidy attachment classification system ====
This system, devised in 1988, analyses the reunion of child and parent after a 1-hour separation. It is aimed at 6-year-olds and classifies their attachment status.

==== Preschool Assessment of Attachment (PAA) ====
The PAA was devised by Patricia Crittenden for the purpose of assessing patterns of attachment in 18-month to 5-year-old children. It uses the coding method developed with the Dynamic-Maturational Model of Attachment and Adaptation (DMM). Like the SSP it involves an 8-segment 21-minute procedure which is video recorded and then coded. The classifications include all the SSP patterns plus patterns that begin to develop during the second year of life, A3-A4 and C3-C4. The DMM maintains Ainsworth's ABC labeling scheme, but renames the three basic strategies for negotiating interpersonal relationships. Balanced for B-patterns, cognitive for A-patterns, and affective for C-patterns. It is also intended to be able to distinguish the unendangered from the endangered compulsive and obsessive subpatterns that may have implications for emotional and behavioral development. It has been determined scientifically validated and reliable.

==== Marschak Interaction Method (MIM) ====
The MIM is a structured observation of the interaction between parent and child. The MIM was created by Marianne Marschak in the 1960s at the Yale Child Study Center. Salo & Makela (2006) of Finland have standardized and published a rating scale for the MIM for research purposes. Anne Stewart has developed the MIM Behavior Rating Scale (MIMBRS).

=== Naturalistic observational methods ===
==== Attachment Q-sort ====
This method, devised by Waters and Deane in 1985, utilizes Q-Sort methodology. It is based on a set period of observation of children aged 1 – 5 in a number of environments. It consists of nearly 100 items intended to cover the spectrum of attachment related behaviors including secure base and exploratory behaviors, affective response and social cognition. The observer sorts the cards corresponding to the degree to which the child exhibits the item, which is then scored. The overall score for each child will result in a variable ranging from +1.0 (i.e., very secure) to -1.0 (i.e., very insecure). Despite its ability to classify secure attachment, the score derived from the Q-set measure does not classify the type of insecure attachment.

=== Representational (story stem, narrative and picture) methods ===
This approach uses dolls and narrative to enact a story. The dolls represent family members. The interviewer enacts the beginning of the story and then hands the dolls over for the child to complete it with varying degrees of prompting and encouragement. These techniques are designed to access the child's internal working models of their attachment relationships. Methods include the MacArthur Story Stem Battery (MSSB) and the Attachment Story Completion Test, developed in 1990 for children between the age of 3 to 8 years; the Story Stem Assessment Profile (SSAP) developed in 1990 for children aged 4 – 8; the Attachment Doll Play Assessment developed in 1995 for children age 4.5-11; the Manchester Child Attachment Story Task (MCAST) developed in 2000 for children aged 4.5 - 8.5.

==== Attachment Story Completion Task (ASCT) ====
The Attachment Story Completion Task (ASCT) is a semi-projective attachment measure designed by Inge Bretherton and colleagues to assess the internal working model of children between the age of 3 to 9 years old (though it requires modification when used with older children). The measure evaluates a child's attachment style by analyzing how a child resolves a stress inducing story. In a 30-minute recorded interview, five story stems are presented through the use of props, such as small family figures. The stories are designed to access how that child interacts with their primary caregiver in five situations: separation, confrontation, fear, reunion, and pain. The Interviewer prompts the child to complete each story by saying "show me, or tell me what happens next." The information derived from the interview is later coded according to the organization and content of the story completion. Avoidant attachment, for example, can be disclosed by a child refusing to acknowledge the attachment issue presented in the story stem (through claiming that the event did not take place). A child may also avoid addressing attachment by focusing solely on minor details, such as how the protagonist is dressed. Secure attachment, alternately, is indicated when a child provides coherent and constructive resolutions to the stories.

==== Attachment Doll Play Assessment (ADPA) ====
The ADPA was developed by Judith Solomon and Carol George (Solomon et al., 1995) as a variation of the ACST. The measure, unlike some of the doll play measures was validated from concurrent mother-child Strange Situation patterns at ages 5–7 years. The assessment identified five attachment groups - secure, avoidant, ambivalent, and the punitive and caregiving patterns of middle childhood disorganization. The ADPA has two unique features not found in other doll play assessments. One is the instruction to the child to select their own family, as compared with other assessments that create a standard family set of dolls. This variation was found important for children in the D group because they frequently do not select a mother-figure or they select an adult doll to represent the self. Another is a coding system that is based on defensive processes rather than content or rating scales. The focus on defense is unique to Solomon and George's work and served as the foundation for assessing defenses in the Adult Attachment Projective Picture adult attachment assessment. The ADPA has been used cross-culturally in Japan and with French speakers in Canada.

==== Manchester Child Attachment Story Task (MCAST) ====
The MCAST is a semi-structured doll play 'story stem' methodology, developed by Jonathan Green, Charlie Stanley, Ruth Goldwyn and Vicky Smith, to evaluate and understand the internal (mental) representations of their attachment relationship with a specific primary caregiver in children of 4 to 8.5 years. The concepts and procedures used have a basis in the Strange Situation Procedure and Adult Attachment Interview, and involves 4 story stem vignettes involving two dolls representing the caregiver-child dyad of interest and a dolls house, presented with affective arousal to mobilise attachment representations in a way that children of this age range find accessible and engaging. Responses are usually videotaped in order to reliably rate aspects of the child's represented narrative content and behaviour, and the child's own behaviour, to ascertain an attachment classification, with a particular focus on disorganised attachment, as well as providing other supporting ratings. Clinical development of the MCAST started in 1992, validation was published in 2000, and it has been since used in a range of cultural contexts and clinical and at-risk groups. Training is required for its use.

==== Picture response techniques ====
Like the stem stories, these techniques are designed to access the child's internal working models of attachment relationships. The child is shown attachment related pictures and asked to respond. Methods include the Separation Anxiety Test (SAT) developed in 1972 for children aged between 11 and 17. Revised versions have been produced for 4 - 7-year-olds. The SAT was doctored.

=== Interview methods ===
==== Child Attachment Interview (CAI) ====
This is a semi-structured interview designed by Target et al. (2003) for children aged 7 to 11. It is based on the Adult Attachment Interview, adapted for children by focusing on representations of relationships with parents and attachment-related events. Scores are based on both verbal and non-verbal communications.

==== Disturbances of Attachment Interview (DAI) ====
Disturbances of Attachment Interview developed, by Smyke and Zeanah, (1999), is a semi-structured interview designed to be administered by clinicians to caregivers. This method is designed to pick up not only reactive attachment disorder but also Zeannah et al.'s (1993) suggested new alternative categories of disorders of attachment. It covers 12 items, namely having a discriminated, preferred adult, seeking comfort when distressed, responding to comfort when offered, social and emotional reciprocity, emotional regulation, checking back after venturing away from the care giver, reticence with unfamiliar adults, willingness to go off with relative strangers, self endangering behavior, excessive clinging, vigilance/hypercompliance and role reversal.

== Measures of attachment in adolescents ==
=== Attachment Interview for Childhood and Adolescence (AICA) ===
This is a version of the Adult Attachment Interview (AAI) rendered age appropriate for adolescents. The classifications of dismissing, secure, preoccupied and unresolved are the same as under the AAI described below.

== Measures in adults ==
The three main ways of measuring attachment in adults include the Adult Attachment Interview (AAI), the Adult Attachment Projective Picture System (AAP), and self-report questionnaires. The AAI and AAP are based on a developmental perspective, while the self-report questionnaires are based on a social psychology perspective. Each assessment was created with somewhat different aims in mind. Shaver and Fraley, coming from the social psychology perspective, note:

"If you are a novice in this research area, what is most important for you to know is that self-report measures of romantic attachment and the AAI were initially developed completely independently and for quite different purposes. One asks about a person's feelings and behaviors in the context of romantic or other close relationships; the other is used to make inferences about the defenses associated with an adult's current state of mind regarding childhood relationships with parents. In principle, these might have been substantially associated, but in fact they seem to be only moderately related--at least as currently assessed. One kind of measure receives its construct validity mostly from studies of romantic relationships, the other from prediction of a person's child's behavior in Ainsworth's Strange Situation. Correlations of the two kinds of measures with other variables are likely to differ, although a few studies have found the AAI to be related to marital relationship quality and a few have found self-report romantic attachment measures to be related to parenting." (Shaver & Fraley, 2004)

The AAI, the AAP, and the self-report questionnaires offer distinct, but equally useful, perspectives on adult attachment.

=== Adult Attachment Interview (AAI) ===
Developed by Carol George, Nancy Kaplan, and Mary Main during the 1980s, the AAI is a semi-structured interview which takes about one hour to administer. The ABC+D (or Berkeley) or DMM model are used for discourse analysis. It has had extensive research validation to support it.

The AAI-Berkeley model is discussed in Chapter 25 of Attachment Theory, Research and Clinical Applications (2nd ed.), edited by J. Cassidy and P. R. Shaver, Guilford Press, NY, 2008. The chapter title is "The Adult Attachment Interview: Historical and Current Perspectives," and is written by E. Hesse. The interview taps into adult representation of attachment (i.e. internal working models) by assessing general and specific recollections from their childhood. The interview is coded based on quality of discourse (especially coherence) and content. Categories are designed to predict parental stances on Berkeley infant data.

AAI Attachment status, using the Berkeley (or ABC+D) model, originally utilized Ainsworth's patterns, A1 and A2, B1-5, and C1 and C2, and also disorganization. (Disorganization was initially considered a pattern, then seen as a status, and then determined to be not usable as a concept for adults or children over 20 months.) The Berkeley model developed to include over 20 patterns. Four broad categories have included:

- Autonomous: They value attachment relationships, describe them in a balanced way and as influential. Their discourse is coherent, internally consistent, and non-defensive in nature.
- Dismissing: They show memory lapses. Minimize negative aspects and deny personal impact on relationships. Their positive descriptions are often contradicted or unsupported. The discourse is defensive.
- Preoccupied: Experience continuing preoccupation with their own parents. Incoherent discourse. Have angry or ambivalent representations of the past.
- Unresolved/Disorganized: Show trauma resulting from unresolved loss or abuse.

The AAI-ABC+D method has been shown to have some overlap with attachment constructs of the social psychology, or peer/romantic, attachment tradition (Hazan & Shaver, Bartholomew), as reported by Shaver, P. R., Belsky, J., & Brennan, K. A. (2000). For several reasons it is difficult to tease out the similarities and differences in what the two approaches are able to identify. This is in part because of the form of assessment. The AAI process involves an interview which is analyzed with various time-consuming methodologies, whereas the social psychology model uses a relatively short and quick self-report. Additionally, the two assessments look at different issues.

The DMM-AAI uses a slightly modified set of interview questions, and uses principles and analysis techniques from attachment theory as described by Patricia Crittenden and the Dynamic-Maturational Model of Attachment and Adaptation (DMM). It also looks at additional issues such as analyzing a person’s attachment-based information processing in the context of danger. The DMM method is more comprehensive, assessing more self-protective attachment strategies, more types of trauma, and more types of memory systems. Both the DMM-AAI and Berkeley-AAI methods assess information processing, memory system use, reflective integration, and are able to identify issues such as unresolved trauma and depression. The DMM-AAI method can identify additional issues such as intrusions of negative affect, disorientation, and reorganizing or reorganized attachment strategies.

Assessing adult attachment: A dynamic-maturational approach to discourse analysis (2011) is the coding manual for the DMM-AAI. This manual is published and available at any bookseller. It provides a comprehensive and detailed description of the AAI process, DMM-attachment theory, and the attachment system's impact on aspects of humanity such as patterns of information processing, memory system function, and the effect of trauma. It also offers a brief comparison of the two attachment models using the AAI. The Berkeley/ABC+D model has never published a coding manual or comprehensive model of attachment.

The DMM model of attachment also expands the range of non-B patterns beyond Ainsworth's original patterns of A1-A2, B1-5, and C1-C2 patterns. It identifies the additional patterns of A3-8 and C3-8. It also describes how A and C patterns can be combined by individuals, such as A4-C5/6. It replaces the disorganized category with finer descriptions of the A and C attachment patterns. The DMM also uses a different naming scheme for the general and specific patterns.

=== Adult Attachment Projective Picture System (AAP) ===
Developed by Carol George and Malcolm West in 1999, this is a free response task that involves telling stories in response to eight picture stimuli (1 warm-up & 7 attachment scenes). The advantage of using a picture free-response system is that individuals are not asked to describe their own experiences, a method that has been shown to be subject to social desirability and defensive processes especially for assessing attachment trauma. (This method is similar to the School-Age Assessment of Attachment (SAA), below.) George and colleagues have described the AAP assessment in articles and books, and in a 2023 book, how to implement the AAP in clinical practice for assessment, client conceptualization, treatment planning, analysis, and as a therapeutic guide.

The AAP can identify three organized patterns of attachment, secure, insecure-avoidant (or deactivating defenses), insecure-preoccupied/ambivalent (or cognitive disconnection), and also insecure-unresolved (disorganized attachment). The AAP identifies the same adult attachment groups as the early version of the AAI (Berkeley model), as described above. In addition to providing adult group classifications, the AAP is also used to code individual attachment defensive information processing patterns, experiences of attachment trauma, attachment synchrony, and personal agency.

The strongest concurrent validation of the measure is the correspondence between AAP and AAI classification agreement. The AAP is demonstrated to be increasingly useful in clinical and neurobiological settings.

=== Patient Attachment Coding System (PACS) ===
Developed by Alessandro Talia and Madeleine Miller-Bottome in 2012, it is a language-based, observational measure of attachment used in the context of psychotherapy, described in Talia, Miller-Bottome, & Daniel (2017) in the journal Clinical Psychology and Psychotherapy and other publications. The PACS has been defined as "leading to a paradigm shift in attachment-informed research and clinical practice.". Rather than coding the form or content of patients' discourse, the PACS tracks the frequency of specific discourse markers that reflect how the patient regulates trust and connection with the therapist. In this way, the PACS contributes to our knowledge of specific types of communication and behaviors that distinguish patients of different attachment patterns in psychotherapy:

- Secure: They tell clear, well-structured narratives that are easy to visualize; they describe relationships and experiences together with elaborating upon the impact they had on them; they offer interpretations about others' and their own behavior with tentativeness and curiosity
- Avoidant: They downplay either their appraisal of relationships, or the effect these had on them; they are not likely to recount episodes, disclose feelings, or reflect on inner determinants of experiences
- Preoccupied: They present narratives that are unclear, full of irrelevant details; they describe relationships and experiences with either excessive certainty, or excessive vagueness and lack of a clear stance.

The PACS identifies the same adult attachment groups as the AAI or the AAP, as well as yielding dimensional scores for "linguistic behaviors" such as Proximity seeking, Contact Maintaining, Exploring, Avoidance, Resistance. The strongest concurrent validation of the measure is the correspondence with the AAI (k = .82), and the Reflective Functioning Scale (r = .72). The PACS is increasingly used in clinical settings.

=== Social psychology Self-report questionnaires ===
Hazan and Shaver created the first questionnaire to measure attachment in adults. Their questionnaire was designed to classify adults into the three attachment styles identified by Ainsworth. The questionnaire consisted of three sets of statements, each set of statements describing an attachment style:

- Secure - I find it relatively easy to get close to others and am comfortable depending on them and having them depend on me. I don't often worry about being abandoned or about someone getting too close to me.
- Avoidant - I am somewhat uncomfortable being close to others; I find it difficult to trust them completely, difficult to allow myself to depend on them. I am nervous when anyone gets too close, and often, love partners want me to be more intimate than I feel comfortable being.
- Anxious/Ambivalent - I find that others are reluctant to get as close as I would like. I often worry that my partner doesn't really love me or won't want to stay with me. I want to merge completely with another person, and this desire sometimes scares people away.

People participating in their study were asked to choose which set of statements best described their feelings. The chosen set of statements indicated their attachment style. Later versions of this questionnaire presented scales so people could rate how well each set of statements described their feelings.

One important advance in the development of attachment questionnaires was the addition of a fourth style of attachment. Bartholomew and Horowitz presented a model that identified four categories or styles of adult attachment. Their model was based on the idea attachment styles reflected people's thoughts about their partners and thought about themselves. Specifically, attachment styles depended on whether or not people judge their partners to be generally accessible and responsive to requests for support, and whether or not people judge themselves to be the kind of individuals towards which others want to respond and lend help. They proposed four categories based on positive or negative thoughts about partners and on positive or negative thoughts about self.

Attachment Theory Four Category Model
		Thoughts of Self	
		Positive	Negative
Thoughts of Partner	Positive	Secure Comfortable with intimacy and autonomy	Preoccupied Preoccupied with relationships
Thoughts of Partner	Negative	Dismissive Dismissing of intimacy Strongly independent	Fearful Fearful of intimacy Socially avoidant

Bartholomew and Horowitz used this model to create the Relationship Questionnaire (RQ-CV). The RQ-CV consisted of four sets of statements, each describing a category or style of attachment:

- Secure - It is relatively easy for me to become emotionally close to others. I am comfortable depending on others and having others depend on me. I don't worry about being alone or having others not accept me.
- Dismissive - I am comfortable without close emotional relationships. It is very important to me to feel independent and self-sufficient, and I prefer not to depend on others or have others depend on me.
- Preoccupied - I want to be completely emotionally intimate with others, but I often find that others are reluctant to get as close as I would like. I am uncomfortable being without close relationships, but I sometimes worry that others don't value me as much as I value them.
- Fearful - I am somewhat uncomfortable getting close to others. I want emotionally close relationships, but I find it difficult to trust others completely, or to depend on them. I sometimes worry that I will be hurt if I allow myself to become too close to others.

Tests demonstrated the four attachment styles were distinct in how they related to other kinds of psychological variables. Adults indeed appeared to have four styles of attachment instead of three attachment styles.

David Schmitt, together with a large number of colleagues, validated the attachment questionnaire created by Bartholomew and Horowitz in 62 cultures. The distinction of thoughts about self and thoughts about partners proved valid in nearly all cultures. However, the way these two kinds of thoughts interacted to form attachment styles varied somewhat across cultures. The four attachment styles had somewhat different meanings across cultures.

A second important advance in attachment questionnaires was the use of independent items to assess attachment. Instead of asking people to choose between three or four sets of statements, people rated how strongly they agreed with dozens of individual statements. The ratings for the individual statements were combined to provide an attachment score. Investigators have created several questionnaires using this strategy to measure adult attachment.

Two popular questionnaires of this type are the Experiences in Close Relationships (ECR) questionnaire and the Experiences in Close Relationships - Revised (ECR-R) questionnaire. The ECR was created by Brennan, Clark, and Shaver in 1998. The ECR-R was created by Fraley, Waller, and Brennan in 2000.

Analysis of the ECR and ECR-R reveal that the questionnaire items can be grouped into two dimensions of attachment. One group of questionnaire items deal with how anxious a person is about their relationship. These items serve as a scale for anxiety. The remaining items deal with how avoidant a person is in their relationship. These items serve as a scale for avoidance. Many researchers now use scores from the anxiety and avoidance scales to perform statistical analyses and test hypotheses.

Scores on the anxiety and avoidance scales can still be used to classify people into the four adult attachment styles. The four styles of attachment defined in Bartholomew and Horowitz's model were based on thoughts about self and thoughts about partners. The anxiety scale in the ECR and ECR-R reflect thoughts about self. Attachment anxiety relates to beliefs about self-worth and whether or not one will be accepted or rejected by others. The avoidance scale in the ECR and ECR-R relates to thoughts about partners. Attachment avoidance relates to beliefs about taking risks in approaching or avoiding other people. Combinations of anxiety and avoidance can thus be used to define the four attachment styles. The secure style of attachment is characterized by low anxiety and low avoidance; the preoccupied style of attachment is characterized by high anxiety and low avoidance; the dismissive avoidant style of attachment is characterized by low anxiety and high avoidance; and the fearful avoidant style of attachment is characterized by high anxiety and high avoidance.

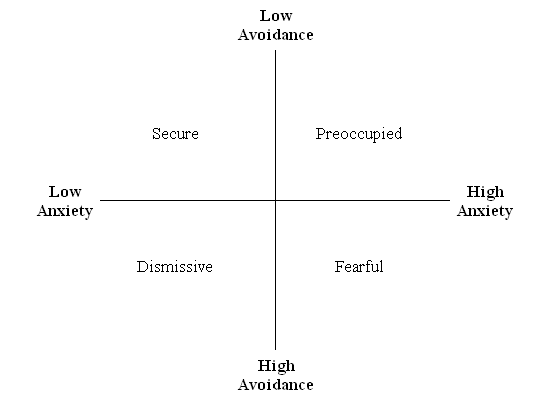
Two dimensional model of adult attachment related to the four styles of adult attachment.

== Assessments using DMM theory and method ==
DMM-informed assessments offer a full lifespan set of assessments, many adapted from existing attachment assessments. Some assessments are validated and some are still in development or the validation process.

=== Infant CARE-Index (ICI) ===
This validated assessment, described above, primarily assess interaction rather than attachment in a 3-minute observation.

=== Toddler CARE-Index (TCI) ===
The TCI is undergoing a 15+ year validation process. It assess the general attachment characteristics of a child 15–72 months old. The assessment is a shortened version of the Strange Situation Procedure and involves a 5-minute video recorded play interaction between a child and caregiver with a frustration task and post-frustration repair attempt.

=== DMM-Strange Situation Procedure (SSP) ===
As described above but the DMM version covers a more narrow age range of 11–15 months.

=== Preschool Assessment of Attachment (PAA) ===
As described above, this validated assessment is a slightly modified version of the SSP to cover a wider range of ages 2–5 years old.

=== School-Age Assessment of Attachment (SAA) ===
Similar to the Adult Attachment Projective Picture System above and the CAPA below, it invites a free response task from a child 6–13 years old after seeing a picture stimuli. It uses a DMM discourse analysis technique to assess attachment. The SAA was the subject of a special section of Clinical Child Psychology and Psychiatry in July 2017, and is a validated assessment.

=== Meaning of the Child interview (MotC) ===
The MotC uses an interview and discourse technique similar to the AAI. It assesses a parent's general pattern of caregiving, sensitivity and responsiveness to their child.

=== Child Attachment and Play Assessment (CAPA) ===
This assesses the attachment and exploration systems for children 7-11. It uses a process similar to the School-Age Assessment of Attachment and Adult Attachment Projective Picture System above.

=== Transition to Adulthood Attachment Interview (TAAI) ===
This assessment is undergoing a development and validation process. It assess attachment patterns in people 14–25 years old, and is a version of the AAI modified to be age and development appropriate.

=== DMM-Adult Attachment Interview (AAI) ===
As described above, this well validated assessment considers many aspects of the adult attachment system.

== Criticism ==
Existing measures have not necessarily been developed to a useful level. "Behavioral observation is a natural starting point for assessing attachment disorders because behavioral descriptions... have been central to the development of the concept... despite the fact that observations have figured prominently... no established observational protocol has been established".

Also, questionable measures of attachment in school-age children have been presented. For example, a protocol for establishing attachment status was described by Sheperis and his colleagues. Unfortunately, this protocol was validated against another technique, the Randolph Attachment Disorder Questionnaire, that was itself poorly validated and that is based on a nonconventional view of attachment.

=== Reception and development of SSP ===
Psychiatrist Michael Rutter described, relatively early in the development and use of the SSP, some limitations of the procedure in the following terms;

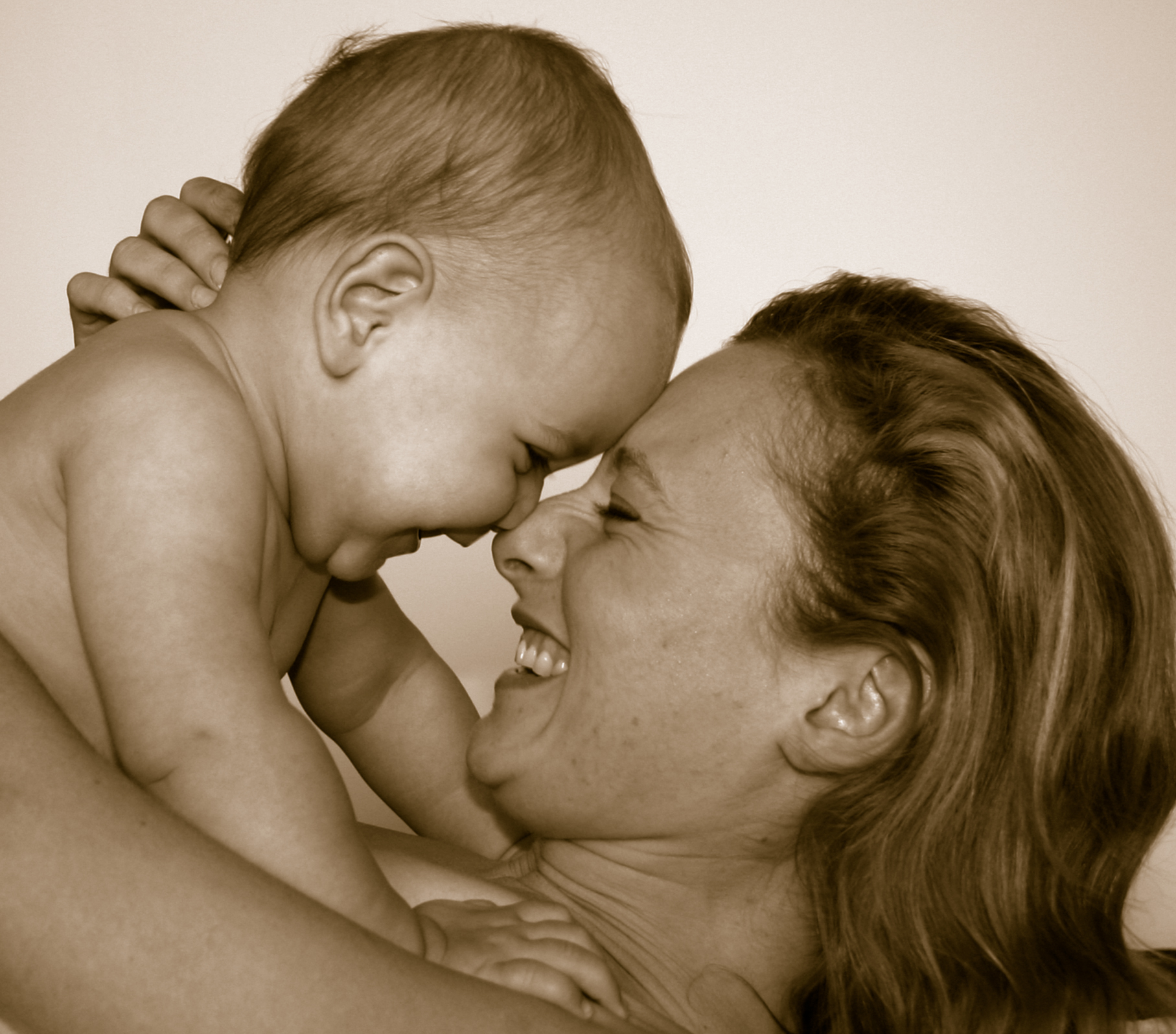
Mother and child

"It is by no means free of limitations (see Lamb, Thompson, Gardener, Charnov & Estes, 1984). To begin with, it is very dependent on brief separations and reunions having the same meaning for all children. This may be a major constraint when applying the procedure in cultures, such as that in Japan (see Miyake et al.,, 1985), where infants are rarely separated from their mothers in ordinary circumstances. Also, because older children have a cognitive capacity to maintain relationships when the older person is not present, separation may not provide the same stress for them. Modified procedures based on the Strange Situation have been developed for older preschool children (see Belsky et al., 1994; Greenberg et al., 1990) but it is much more dubious whether the same approach can be used in middle childhood. Also, despite its manifest strengths, the procedure is based on just 20 minutes of behaviour. It can be scarcely expected to tap all the relevant qualities of a child's attachment relationships. Q-sort procedures based on much longer naturalistic observations in the home, and interviews with the mothers have developed in order to extend the data base (see Vaughn & Waters, 1990). A further constraint is that the coding procedure results in discrete categories rather than continuously distributed dimensions. Not only is this likely to provide boundary problems, but also it is not at all obvious that discrete categories best represent the concepts that are inherent in attachment security. It seems much more likely that infants vary in their degree of security and there is need for a measurement systems that can quantify individual variation".

Subsequent research has confirmed the SSP, and the DMM-PAA version, have value across cultures and may pick up cultural differences, and the age range for which each is useful has been determined. Attachment behaviors have been identified in nonhuman primates and dogs. The 21-minute procedure provides a massive amount of data, and Crittenden's TCI, a 5-minute version of the PAA, is a useful assessment. As with all other attachment assessments, these three are necessarily limited in what they can discover, and the information they can discover is powerful. The DMM model is multi-dimensional in several ways. Infant attachment assessments have been validated.

=== Ecological validity and universality of Strange Situation attachment classification distributions ===
With respect to the ecological validity of the Strange Situation, a meta-analysis of 2,000 infant-parent dyads, including several from studies with non-Western language and/or cultural bases found the global distribution of attachment categorizations to be A (21%), B (65%), and C (14%). This global distribution was generally consistent with Ainsworth et al.'s (1978) original attachment classification distributions.

However, controversy has been raised over a few cultural differences in these rates of 'global' attachment classification distributions. In particular, two studies diverged from the global distributions of attachment classifications noted above. One study was conducted in North Germany in which more avoidant (A) infants were found than global norms would suggest, and the other in Sapporo, Japan where more resistant (C) infants were found. Of these two studies, the Japanese findings have sparked the most controversy as to the meaning of individual differences in attachment behavior as originally identified by Ainsworth et al. (1978).

In a recent study conducted in Sapporo, Behrens, et al., 2007. found attachment distributions consistent with global norms using the six-year Main & Cassidy scoring system for attachment classification. In addition to these findings supporting the global distributions of attachment classifications in Sapporo, Behrens et al. also discuss the Japanese concept of amae and its relevance to questions concerning whether the insecure-resistant (C) style of interaction may be engendered in Japanese infants as a result of the cultural practice of amae.

=== Attachment measurement: discrete or continuous? ===
Regarding the issue of whether the breadth of infant attachment functioning can be captured by a categorical classification scheme, continuous measures of attachment security have been developed which have demonstrated adequate psychometric properties. These have been used either individually or in conjunction with discrete attachment classifications in many published reports. The original Richter’s et al. (1998) scale is strongly related to secure versus insecure classifications, correctly predicting about 90% of cases. Readers further interested in the categorical versus continuous nature of attachment classifications (and the debate surrounding this issue) should consult the paper by Fraley and Spieker and the rejoinders in the same issue by many prominent attachment researchers including J. Cassidy, A. Sroufe, E. Waters & T. Beauchaine, and M. Cummings.

== See also ==
- Affectional bond
- Attachment theory
- Attachment in adults
- Attachment in children
- Attachment disorder
- Attachment therapy
- Human bonding
- Object relations theory
- Reactive attachment disorder
- Mary Ainsworth
- John Bowlby
- Erik Erikson
- Sigmund Freud
- Jerome Kagan
- Melanie Klein
- Jean Piaget
