= Mary Dozier =

American psychologist

Mary Dozier, an American psychologist, holds the Amy E. du Pont Chair of Child Development at the University of Delaware.

Dozier studied at Duke University where she received her degree in psychology in 1976, and her PhD in clinical psychology in 1983. She joined the faculty at Delaware in 1994.

She is one of the originators of the Attachment and Biobehavioral Catch-up (ABC) parenting intervention. The intervention has been endorsed by the California Evidence-Based Clearing House for Child Welfare. The focus of the intervention is on increasing caregiver nurturance, the capacity of the caregiver to follow the child's lead, and the avoidance of intrusive or frightening behaviours by the caregiver. Several randomised control trials have documented the effectiveness of ABC in improving caregiver sensitivity and infant attachment security, as well as reducing later aggressive behaviour by the child. The ABC intervention has also been documented to have impacts on neurological and endocrine processes suggestive of emotion regulation.

ABC is currently regarded as among the most successful of the second generation of attachment-based parenting interventions. In acknowledgement of her contributions to attachment theory, Dozier was awarded the Bowlby-Ainsworth Award for Translational Research on Adoption.

== Publications ==
Her most highly cited articles include:

- Dozier M, Stoval KC, Albus KE, Bates B. Attachment for infants in foster care: The role of caregiver state of mind .Child development. 2001 Sep;72(5):1467-77.
- Dozier M, Kobak RR. Psychophysiology in attachment interviews: Converging evidence for deactivating strategies. Child development. 1992 Dec;63(6):1473-80.
- Mary Dozier, Kelly L Cue, Lara Barnett. Clinicians as caregivers: role of attachment organization in treatment. Journal of consulting and clinical psychology 62 (4) 793.
