= Clinical Child Psychology and Psychiatry =

- Discipline: Child psychology, child psychiatry
- Language: English
- Edited by: Anna Brazier, Michael Tarren-Sweeney

Publication details
- History: 1996-present
- Publisher: SAGE Publications
- Frequency: Quarterly

Standard abbreviations
- ISO 4: Clin. Child Psychol. Psychiatry

Indexing
- CODEN: CCPPFR
- ISSN: 1359-1045 (print); 1461-7021 (web)
- LCCN: 96642251
- OCLC no.: 41383796

Links
- Journal homepage; Online access; Online archive

Clinical Child Psychology and Psychiatry is a quarterly peer-reviewed academic journal that covers the field of child psychology and psychiatry. The editors-in-chief are Anna Brazier (University Hospital of Wales) and Michael Tarren-Sweeney (University of Canterbury). It was established in 1996 and is currently published by SAGE Publications.

== History ==
The journal was founded in 1996 by Bryan Lask. He wanted to establish a new international journal that could meet the needs of clinicians working with children and families in all kinds of settings and services. He was keen for it to be very readable, to reach out across disciplines and across different therapeutic orientations. Since its inception it has continued to provide a valued resource for clinicians under the editorship of Bernadette Wren, Arlene Vetere Rudi Dallos and now Michael Tarren-Sweeney and Anna Brazier. The journal continues to aim to share creative and innovative work across disciplines in a way that gives voice to experience in practice.

== Scope ==
Clinical Child Psychology and Psychiatry is interested in advancing theory, practice and clinical research in the realm of child and adolescent psychology and psychiatry and related disciplines.

== Abstracting and indexing ==
Clinical Child Psychology and Psychiatry is abstracted and indexed in:

- Academic Search Premier
- Current Contents/Social and Behavioral Sciences
- Current Contents/Social and Behavioral Sciences
- Index Medicus/MEDLINE
- Psychological Abstracts
- PsycINFO
- Scopus
- Social Sciences Citation Index
