= Colwyn Trevarthen =

New Zealand-British academic (1931–2024)

Colwyn Trevarthen (2 March 1931 - 1 July 2024) was a New Zealand-British academic who was Professor of Child Psychology and Psychobiology at the University of Edinburgh.

== Background ==
Trevarthen was born in Auckland, New Zealand on 2 March 1931. After training as a biologist in New Zealand at Auckland University College and Otago University, Trevarthen researched infancy at Harvard in 1967. He died on 1 July 2024, at the age of 93.

== Work ==
Trevarthen published on brain development, infant communication and emotional health. He believed that very young babies rapidly develop proto-cultural intelligence through interacting with other people, including in teasing fun play. For instance he demonstrated that a newborn had an innate ability to initiate a dialogic relationship with an adult, and then build up this relationship through eye contact, smiling, and other holistic body functions rhythmically and cooperatively.

He studied successful interactions between infants and their primary care givers, and found that the mother's responsiveness to her baby's initiatives supported and developed intersubjectivity (shared understanding), which he regarded as the basis of all effective communication, interaction and learning.

He applied intersubjectivity to the very rapid cultural development of new born infants. and used the term ‘primary intersubjectivity’ to refer to early developing sensory-motor processes of interaction between infants and caregivers. He believes babies are looking for companionship (including the sense of fun and playfulness), engagement and relationship (rather than using the term attachment), and that companions can include mothers, fathers, other adults, peers and siblings; he has said "I think the ideal companion – and it can be a practitioner or not – is a familiar person who really treats the baby with playful human respect."

In later years his work focused on the musicality of babies, including its use in communication.

He was a fellow of the Norwegian Academy of Science and Letters.

== Video interaction guidance ==
In the 1980s Harry Biemans, in the Netherlands, applied Trevarthen's research using video clips and created video interaction guidance (VIG), which is used for instance with mothers and young babies in attachment-based therapy.

== Quote ==
Stephen Seligman said Trevarthen "has distinguished himself for more than four decades as one of the most inventive and rigorous explorers of infant development and its implications. Among the infant research cognoscenti, he ranks... in breaking misleading assumptions of the varied disciplines to see what mothers and babies really do."

== See also ==
- Baby talk
- Attachment-based therapy
- Intersubjectivity
- Musicality
- Interaction theory
