= Patricia McKinsey Crittenden =

American psychologist

Patricia M. Crittenden
- Born: 1945 (age 80–81); Los Angeles, California, U.S.
- Other name: Pat Crittenden
- Education: University of Virginia
- Known for: Dynamic-maturational model of attachment and adaptation
- Scientific career
- Fields: Attachment theory, information processing
- Workplaces: Family Relations Institute, International Association for the Study of Attachment
- Doctoral advisor: Mary Ainsworth
- Other academic advisors: John Bowlby, David Finkelhor
- Website: www.patcrittenden.com

Patricia McKinsey Crittenden (born 1945) is an American psychologist known for her work in the development of attachment theory and science, her work in the field of developmental psychopathology, and for creation of the dynamic-maturational model of attachment and adaptation (DMM).

Compared to other work in attachment, the DMM emphasizes the organized self-protective function of attachment strategies (rather than disorganization) and the advantages of adaptation to dangerous circumstances (rather than security). The DMM describes self-protective strategies and patterns of information processing in greater detail than any other attachment-informed model. Crittenden developed an interlocking set of scientific assessments of attachment across the lifespan. The DMM is usable in research, forensic and clinical settings.

Crittenden obtained her Ph.D. at the University of Virginia under the supervision of Mary Ainsworth. She has served on various University faculties internationally, and published five books and over 100 research journal articles. She is the founder of the Family Relations Institute and currently serves as its lead instructor and Director of Research and Publication, and serves as a member of the board of directors for the International Association for the Study of Attachment. Her most well known work is Raising Parents: Attachment, Representation, and Treatment (2nd edition, 2016, Routledge).

== Early study with Ainsworth ==
The Strange Situation Procedure was first used by Ainsworth and Wittig (1969) to assess individual differences in the responses of 56 middle-class non-clinical infants aged 11 months to the departure of a caregiver. Infants classified as Secure (type B) used the caregiver as a safe base from which to explore, protested at their departure but sought the caregiver upon his or her return. Infants classified as Anxious-Avoidant (A) did not exhibit distress on separation, and ignored the caregiver on their return. Separation of an infant from her caregiver was theorised by Bowlby (1960) to necessarily evoke anxiety, as a reaction hard-wired by evolution since the infant cannot survive without the caregiver. Hence the apparently unruffled behaviour of the type A infants was understood by Ainsworth as a mask for distress, a point later evidenced through studies of heart-rate (Sroufe & Waters 1977). Infants classified as Anxious-Ambivalent/Resistant (C), showed distress on separation, and were clingy and difficult to comfort on the caregiver's return. A set of protocols for classifying infants into one of these groups was established by Ainsworth's influential Patterns of Attachment (Ainsworth et al. 1978).

Crittenden was a doctoral student of Mary Ainsworth in the early 1980s. Two surprising findings faced Ainsworth's doctoral students. The first surprising finding was that Ainsworth's ABC classification of infant behaviour in the Strange Situation Procedure appeared to account for the overwhelming majority of middle-class infants. Crittenden (1995: 368) and other students of Ainsworth were therefore brought to ask: ‘Why are there only three patterns of attachment when mothers are highly varied?’. The fact that these three patterns appeared so widely suggested that, on the one hand, the activation of the attachment system when an infant is anxious appeared to be an innate psycho-physiological mechanism. On the other hand, this finding implied that the quality of the attachment behaviour elicited by this anxiety differed in systematic ways as a function of the infant's caregiving environment.

A second surprising finding that confronted Ainsworth's students, however, was that not all infants could be classified using Ainsworth's 1978 protocols for classifying infant behaviour in the Strange Situation. This was especially the case with children from maltreatment samples, but it also occurred in samples of infants from middle-class homes.

== Bowlby and information processing ==
The founder of attachment theory, John Bowlby, had argued that ‘given certain adverse circumstances during childhood, the selective exclusion of information of certain sorts may be adaptive. Yet, when during adolescence and adult the situation changes, the persistent exclusion of the same forms of information may become maladaptive’. This was an important foundation for Crittenden's ideas. Her first study, supervised by Ainsworth, was of 73 infants and toddlers. Most of this sample had experienced severe maltreatment. Like Ainsworth's previous doctoral students, Crittenden found that ‘not all infants can be placed easily into the three categories described above’; she proposed that the Avoidant (A) and Ambivalent/Resistant (C) responses can be regarded as excluding ‘some classes of information’ relevant to ‘the activation of the attachment system’. Crittenden worked from ‘a basic premise of ethology – that universal behaviours often serve functions that promote survival’. She proposed that the basic components of human experience of danger are two kinds of information:

1. Emotions provoked by the potential for danger, such as anger or fear. Crittenden terms this ‘affective information’. In childhood this information would include emotions provoked by the unexplained absence of an attachment figure.

2. Causal or other sequentially ordered knowledge about the potential for safety or danger. In childhood this would include knowledge regarding the behaviours that indicate an attachment figure's availability as a secure haven.

== Patterns of attachment as splits in information ==
For Crittenden, Secure (B) infants utilise both kinds of information with little distortion: they respond to the caregiver's cues, and can communicate their distress, but also gain comfort when this is available. They can balance their knowledge of causal contingencies and their knowledge of their feelings. By contrast, Crittenden proposes that both kinds of information can be split off from consciousness or behavioural expression as a ‘strategy’ to maintain the availability of an attachment figure. The term ‘strategy’ is used by Crittenden, not in ‘the narrow sense of a cognitive plan, that is, a response to an articulated problem preceded by a conscious analysis of behavioural alternatives’, but as a transformation of information regarding danger that occurs without conscious thought.

Crittenden theorised that infants using an Avoidant strategy split off emotional information about distress. Splitting off emotional information allows an infant facing insensitive caregiving to simplify the complexity of the situation with the neurological means at their disposal: they "avoid" expressing negative emotions when they are anxious, and in doing so avoid antagonising or alienating their attachment figure. By contrast, infants using an Ambivalent/Resistant strategy split off temporally-sequenced knowledge about how and why the attachment figure is available. If such information is ignored, then the infant becomes focused on pre-empting the unknown availability of the caregiver, and seeking to keep the attention of their caregiver through clingy or aggressive behaviour, or alternating combinations of the two. Ambivalent/Resistant behaviour may increase the availability of an attachment figure who otherwise displays inconsistent or misleading responses to the infant's attachment behaviours, suggesting the unreliability of protection and safety.

In her study, Crittenden noted that the infants who had experienced both abuse and neglect in her sample tended to ‘show an A/C pattern as do a few who are only abused and also a few who only neglected’ Yet Crittenden also observed some infants who did not fit well into an A, B, C or A/C classification; they did not appear able to effectively manage their behaviour in the service of maintaining the availability of their caregiver in the Strange Situation Procedure. For instance, instead of an attachment pattern, one abused infant showed 'stress-related stereotypic headcocking throughout the strange situation. This pervasive behaviour, however, was the only clue to the extent of her stress’. This is a point Crittenden has returned to in her later work. She has emphasised that trauma may result in behaviour which is not well adapted to the present. By ‘trauma’, Crittenden refers to the psychological experience of emotionally or physically threatening circumstances that cannot be subjected to effective information processing. This information-processing perspective emphasises that children are especially vulnerable to trauma: they are ‘less able to understand’ the meaning of experiences of danger than adults and ‘less able to store, retrieve, and integrate’ the meanings they do receive.

== Changes with development ==
Though termed 'insecure', Crittenden councils that the Avoidant (A) and Ambivalent/Resistant (C) strategies should not be regarded as in themselves disordered or problematic, so long as they are not misapplied over time through too general an application to situations where they are inappropriate. She emphasises that a strategy may well change over time as the child matures and circumstances change. As a result, ‘a given pathway may continue straight or may branch in ways that may lead to other pathways’ . Crittenden suggests that one developmental pathway, particularly in the context of danger, is likely to be towards pathology. Whilst Ainsworth had discovered a universal distinction in human emotion regulation between Secure (B), Avoidance (A) and Ambivalence/Resistance (C), in her later work Crittenden develops the idea of A and C as dimensions. She identifies progressive subtypes of each, running from A1-A8 and C1-C8. The higher numbers represent splits in information about emotions or causality applied more regularly and insistently.

Wilcox and Baim offer a good description of these two dimensions:

"Development of the ‘A’ Strategy – Predictability with Lack of Attunement" If the baby’s care is predictable but not attuned, she will develop a markedly different attachment style. When she cries, this baby may be consistently ignored, handled roughly or even physically abused. She will soon withhold such emotional expression because this increases her distress. She learns, ‘When I feel bad, no one helps, and when I cry I feel worse.’ Since this child is growing up in a predictable environment, she learns behavioural consequences, recognising that thinking – in particular, about cause and effect – is critical to survival. This child becomes cognitively organised, and prioritises her thoughts over her feelings knowing that thinking protects her and displaying negative emotions endangers her. She will come to distrust her own emotions – even those which arise when there is perceived threat or danger. However, this child's emotions – particularly those which are survival oriented (fear, anger and need for comfort) still boil away under the surface, and may periodically burst through in sudden episodes of aggression, distress or comfort seeking (which can include sexualised behaviour). As she grows, she becomes more neurobiologically capable of distancing herself from her felt emotions. In toddlerhood, she may develop a caretaking strategy to gain proximity to a psychologically unavailable parent or she may develop a compulsively compliant strategy to appease a predictably abusive or demanding parent. From puberty onwards, the ‘A’ strategy may also incorporate promiscuity (to meet needs for comfort without risking closeness) or isolation and self-reliance (to avoid risk of being hurt).

"Development of the ‘C’ Strategy – Unpredictability with Variable Attunement" The ‘C’ pattern develops when the baby has a carer who is unpredictable and inconsistently attuned. Her carer sometimes responds well and sometimes not. There are many reasons why a carer may be unpredictable, including distractibility, substance misuse, domestic violence or psychological illness. This inconsistency is very confusing for the baby. Her crying, anger or clinginess does not always produce the desired response and she cannot predict when or how her carer will react. This baby learns that her negative emotions when exaggerated are more likely to get results so she becomes affectively organised, trusting and prioritising her feelings over her thoughts. Consequently, tears become wildly exaggerated, sadness inconsolable and expressed anger a temper tantrum. Her strategy becomes acting out to gain her carer's attention. This confuses her carer, who is unaware that their inconsistency worsens the child's behaviour. Moreover, the child learns that to get her needs met she must not only first get her caregiver's attention, she then must hold it. This is the essence of the ‘C’ pattern, which is a twofold strategy: first, exaggerate my feelings of sadness, fear or anger, and then keep changing the problem. When the ‘C’ pattern is firmly established, typically by toddlerhood, both carer and child can descend into misery together. As with the ‘A’ strategy, a child employing a ‘C’ strategy will, as she develops, have the potential to become more subtle and complex in using the strategy. Typically, in childhood, aggressive outbursts will be counterpoised with displays of helplessness or coy behaviour that disarms potential retaliation. This has the effect of keeping the attachment figure locked in an irresolvable struggle, as the child continually switches between anger/aggression and appeasement/comfort seeking to maintain the carer's attention. From puberty onwards, the ‘C’ strategy may develop into aggressive strategies that are focused on revenge and punishing the other person, and/or seeking to be rescued by the other person."

Yet Crittenden also emphasises that development and time may lead away from pathology. A toddler may have come to depend upon a type C strategy of tantrums in aiming to maintain the availability of an attachment figure whose inconsistent availability has led the child to distrust or distort causal information about their apparent behaviour. This may lead their attachment figure to get a clearer grasp on their needs and the appropriate response to their attachment behaviours. Experiencing more reliable and predictable information about the availability of their attachment figure, the toddler then no longer needs to use coercive behaviours with the goal of maintaining their caregiver’s availability. Not only with time can relationships change (e.g. within the family system), but new relationships occur throughout development, and may be the basis for a change of attachment pattern if a relationship is formed with this figure, or if they cause the person to rethink how and whether they seek comfort. Such a new relationship may be with a clinician or other professional, so long as this encounter is not too fleeting. For instance, in work with families experiencing complex difficulties, Crittenden emphasises that ‘observing videotaped parent-child interactions with the parent and discussing these observations from the parent’s perspective can be a powerful means of creating communication between procedural and semantic memory systems’.

== Selected publications (chronologically) ==
- Crittenden, P. M. (1981). Abusing, neglecting, problematic, and adequate dyads: Differentiating by patterns of interaction. Merrill-Palmer Quarterly, 27, 1–18.
- Crittenden, P.M. & DiLalla, D.L. (1988). Compulsive compliance: The development of an inhibitory coping strategy in infancy. Journal of Abnormal Child Psychology, 16, 585–599.
- Crittenden, P.M. & Ainsworth M.D.S. (1989). Child maltreatment and attachment theory. In D. Cicchetti and V. Carlson (Eds.), Handbook of child maltreatment, (pp. 432–463). New York: Cambridge University Press.
- Crittenden, P.M. (1993). "An information-processing perspective on the behaviour of neglectful parents". Criminal Justice and Behavior. 20 (1): 27–48. doi:10.1177/0093854893020001004. S2CID 144670070..
- Crittenden, P.M. (1995). Attachment and psychopathology. In S. Goldberg, R. Muir, J. Kerr, (Eds.), John Bowlby's attachment theory: Historical, clinical, and social significance (pp. 367–406). New York: The Analytic Press.
- Crittenden, P.M. (1997). Truth, error, omission, distortion, and deception: The application of attachment theory to the assessment and treatment of psychological disorder. In S. M. C. Dollinger and L.F. DiLalla (Eds.) Assessment and Intervention Across the Lifespan, (pp. 35–76) Hillsdale, NJ: Erlbaum.
- Crittenden, P.M. (1997). Toward an integrative theory of trauma: A dynamic-maturational approach. In D. Cicchetti and S. Toth (Eds.), The Rochester Symposium on Developmental Psychopathology, Vol. 10. Risk, Trauma, and Mental Processes (pp. 34–84). Rochester, NY: University of Rochester Press.
- Crittenden, P.M. (2000). A dynamic-maturational model of the function, development, and organization of human relationships. In R. S. L. Mills, & S. Duck (Eds.), Developmental psychology of personal relationships (pp. 199–218). Chichester, UK: Wiley.
- Crittenden, P. M. (2006). A dynamic-maturational model of attachment. Australian and New Zealand Journal of Family Therapy, 27, 105-115.
- Crittenden, P.M. (2008). Why do inadequate parents do what they do? In O. Mayseless (Ed.) Parenting Representations, ed. O. Mayseless, (pp. 388–433). Cambridge: Cambridge University Press.
- Crittenden, P.M. & Newman, L. (2010). Comparing models of borderline personality disorder: Mothers’ experience, self-protective strategies, and dispositional representations. Clinical Child Psychology and Psychiatry, 15, 433–452.
- Crittenden, P.M. & Landini, A. (2011). Assessing Adult Attachment: A Dynamic Maturational Approach to Discourse Analysis. New York: W.W. Norton.
- Crittenden, P.M., Farnfield, S., Landini, A. & Grey, B. (2013). Assessing attachment for family court decision-making: A forensic protocol for empirically based evidence regarding attachment, Journal of Forensic Practice. p. 237-248.
- Crittenden, P.M., Dallos, R., Landini, A., Kozlowska, K. (2014). Attachment & Family Therapy. London: Open University Press.
- Crittenden, P.M. (2015). Raising Parents: Attachment, Parenting and Child Safety, 2nd ed., London: Routledge.
- Crittenden, P. M. (2017). Formulating autism systemically: Part 1: A review of the published literature and case assessments. Clinical Child Psychology and Psychiatry, 22, 378–389. DOI: 10.1177/1359104517713241
- Crittenden, P. M., Robson, K., Tooby, A., & Fleming, C. (2017). Are mothers’ protective attachment strategies related to their children's strategies? Clinical Child Psychology and Psychiatry. DOI: 10.1177/1359104517704027
- Crittenden P.M. and Baim C. (2017). Using assessment of attachment in child care proceedings to guide intervention. In: Dixon L, Perkins D, Craig L and Hamilton-Giachritsis (eds) What Works in Child Protection: An Evidenced-Based Approach to Assessment and Intervention in Care Proceedings. Chichester: Wiley-Blackwell, pp. 385–402.
