= Judith V. Jordan =

American psychologist

Judith V. Jordan is the co-director and a founding scholar of the Jean Baker Miller Institute and co-director of the institute's Working Connections Project. She is an attending psychologist at McLean Hospital and assistant professor of psychology at the Harvard Medical School. She works as a psychotherapist, supervisor, teacher and consultant. Jordan's development of relational-cultural therapy has served as a foundation for other scholars who have used this theory to explore the workplace, education. leadership and entrepreneurship.

Jordan is the author of the book Relational-Cultural Therapy, co-author of Women's Growth in Connection, editor of Women's Growth in Diversity, The Complexity of Connection, The Power of Connection, and has published many "Works in Progress" at Wellesley College as well as chapters and journal articles. In addition, Jordan has written, lectured and conducted workshops nationally and internationally on the subjects of relational-cultural theory, women's psychological development, empathy, mutuality, mutual empathy, courage, shame, relational resilience, psychotherapy with women, a relational model of self, relational psychotherapy, gender issues in psychotherapy, relationships between women and men, the mother-daughter and mother-son relationships, special treatment programs for women and treating post-traumatic stress.

In 1997 Jordan shared the Massachusetts Psychological Association's "Career Contribution Award" with Irene Pierce Stiver and Janet Surrey, and in 2010 she received the American Psychological Association Division 29's "Distinguished Psychologist Award for Contributions to Psychology and Psychotherapy".

== Early life ==
Jordan grew up in Stroudsburg, Pennsylvania. In school, Jordan was excluded from safety patrol and shop class in middle school (privileges reserved for boys), but she was encouraged by her mother to fight the exclusion. She attended Abbot Academy (now Phillips Andover Academy) for high school because she had excellent grades and was not being challenged in her small rural school. Jordan struggled with overwhelming homesickness and was shamed into believing that if she couldn't "separate from home, [she] wouldn't be able to succeed at anything" from school authorities. The school determined that Jordan should see a therapist, which was her initial introduction to the profession of psychology, and while this relationship was important, it did not deconstruct Jordan's internalized belief that she had to separate from the people that she loved in order to "be successful" Her interest in the power of connection found its roots in her own struggle to stay connected with important people in a world that told her that was a sign of "weakness". At Brown University she studied psychology, and went on to get her Ph.D. from Harvard University, where she studied child development, and clinical psychology. She wrote her dissertation on how a competitive context interrupts girls' achievement behaviors. As a young faculty and clinician at Harvard Medical School, she began to write about the limitations of a "separate self" model of development and looked at the ways in which empathy provides an experiential sense of connection and compassion.

== Education and early career ==
Jordan received the award for outstanding achievement in her graduate class at Harvard University. She founded the Women's Studies Program and Women's Treatment Network at McLean Hospital and served as its first director.

- Abott Academy (now Phillips Andover Academy), Andover, MA
- BA, Brown University Phi Beta Kappa, Magna Cum Laude
- Ph.D, Clinical Psychology, Harvard University, recognition for outstanding academic performance
- Internship at McLean Hospital, Belmont, MA
- 1978, junior faculty, McLean Hospital Department of Psychology, working with Irene Pierce Stiver and colleague Jan Surrey

At Harvard, Jordan was told that her position in the doctoral program was "wasted on a woman," a refrain that was repeated to other leaders in feminist psychology (including Carol Gilligan). Jordan drew on her mother's experience of being repeatedly told to leave her M.D. program and excelled at Harvard, but she "really went underground in terms of any sense of competence and strength" until she joined Jean Baker Miller's Monday night group. In training, Jordan had been taught that the neutrality of the therapist was paramount to a patient's healing, and that for a therapist to demonstrate any emotional response to a patient's story or feelings would "have a bad impact on the patient". In her own practice, Jordan began to wonder if this distant neutrality was adversely affecting patients. She "couldn't bring herself to abandon her patients to please her supervisors," and "the kind of therapy she did 'felt deviant'" in this respect. Jordan said that she began to meet with the women in Miller's Monday night group, "whom I respected tremendously, seeing that they were living with the same kind of uncomfortableness in this position, and that they were making the same kind of changes in what they were doing was incredibly validating". The core group met every other week for ten years, talking openly and honestly about the work that they were doing, and the things they were learning from and with their patients, in Jean Baker Miller's living room.

== Published works ==
- Women's Growth in Connection (1991) with Miller, J., Kaplan, A., Stiver, I., and Surrey, J.
- Women's Growth in Diversity (1997), editor.
- A Relational-Cultural Model: Healing through Mutual Empathy (2001), Bulletin of the Menninger Clinic, 65(1) 92-103
- A Relational-Cultural Perspective in Therapy (2002) In F. Kazlow (ed) Comprehensive handbook of psychotherapy (Vol 3, pp233–254).
- The Complexity of Connection (2004) with Walker, M. and Hartling, L.
- Recent Developments in Relational-Cultural Theory (2008) In Women And Therapy: A Feminist Quarterly, 31(2)(2/3/4).
- Relational-Cultural Therapy (2010).
- The Power of Connection (2010), editor.
