= Emotional symbiosis =

Form of excessive interdependence

Emotional symbiosis is when an individual has the limited capacity to be aware of, respect, appreciate, and comprehend the subjectivity of another, occurring in a relationship often characterized by excessive interdependence, where individuals are deeply reliant on each other for emotional support and validation. This occurs in the phase of early development when a child is completely dependent, and both physically and emotionally closely bonded with their mother. Emotional symbiosis is a very common occurrence as it originates from the early childhood treatment of babies.

== Theoretical foundations ==
The concept of emotional symbiosis originates from psychoanalytic theory, particularly the work of Margaret Mahler, who described it as a developmental phase in early childhood where the infant perceives no psychological separation between themselves and their caregiver. This stage is crucial for healthy emotional development, but unresolved symbiotic tendencies can lead to dependency issues in adulthood.

Later theorists, such as Heinz Kohut (self-psychology) and John Bowlby (attachment theory), expanded on this idea. Kohut (1971) emphasized the role of empathic attunement in self-development, while Bowlby’s (1969) research highlighted how early attachment patterns influence adult relationships. Emotional symbiosis, when prolonged or recreated in adulthood, can reflect an insecure attachment style, often manifesting as anxious-preoccupied or dependent relational dynamics.

== Psychological and relational manifestations ==
In adult relationships, emotional symbiosis can appear as:

- Enmeshment: A lack of clear boundaries, where individuals over-identify with each other’s emotions.
- Codependency: Excessive emotional reliance on a partner, often at the expense of self-identity.
- Fear of Abandonment: Intense anxiety when separated from the other person, leading to clingy or controlling behaviors.

Emotional symbiosis manifests through various behaviors that reflect attempts to maintain a fused sense of self through others when internal psychological boundaries do not develop properly. These behaviors are variations of the same underlying maladaptive process: the psyche’s attempt to manage the anxiety of psychological separateness by relying on relationships as a form of existential support, rather than fostering authentic emotional connections.

The underlying cause is often an unconscious fear of ego dissolution—the primal anxiety that without constant emotional connection to another person, one's sense of existence may collapse. This fear stems from early attachment disruptions, where caregivers failed to mirror healthy differentiation, leading the individual to internalize the belief that love equals the loss of self.

Pathological symbiosis represents a persistent failure to establish psychological boundaries, often rooted in early attachment disturbances. Bowen's family systems theory particularly emphasizes how chronic emotional fusion inhibits individuation, creating relational patterns where partners regulate each other's emotional states excessively, demonstrate low tolerance for separateness, and experience anxiety when expressing autonomous thoughts or needs.

Some psychologists contend that transient symbiotic tendencies occur naturally in romantic relationships, particularly during initial bonding phases like the "honeymoon period" where partners may experience temporary emotional fusion. This developmental phase typically gives way to healthier differentiation as the relationship matures.

== Culture and society ==
=== Cultural and societal norms ===
Cultural norms shape perceptions of emotional symbiosis. In collectivist societies (e.g., East Asian cultures), interdependence is often valued over individualism, making symbiotic-like bonds more socially accepted. Conversely, individualistic cultures (e.g., Western societies) may pathologize excessive emotional fusion as unhealthy dependency.

=== Gender roles ===
Gender roles may influence the effect of emotional symbiosis in relationships. Traditional femininity is often associated with nurturing and emotional merging, where women are socialized to prioritize others' emotional needs, sometimes leading to overdependence and blurred boundaries. This dynamic fosters a psychological pattern where women may become excessively fused with their partner's emotions, internalizing the belief that their emotional identity is inextricably linked to the other person's wellbeing. In contrast, masculinity often promotes emotional detachment and self-sufficiency, discouraging interdependence. This can contribute to an asymmetry in relationships, where the partner socialized as female may assume the emotional caretaker role, reinforcing patterns of dependency and emotional enmeshment. The result is a relational dynamic that mirrors the psychological mechanisms of emotional symbiosis, where one partner is overly dependent on the other for emotional regulation, undermining both autonomy and healthy emotional boundaries.

== Therapeutic interventions ==
Treatment for emotional symbiosis typically involves psychotherapeutic approaches that promote emotional autonomy and healthier relational dynamics. Interventions aim to help individuals recognize and regulate the boundaries between their emotional experiences and those of others, particularly within intimate or familial relationships.

=== Therapy ===
Various therapeutic modalities have been found effective in treating emotional symbiosis. Dialectical behavior therapy, for example, helps individuals develop mindfulness, emotional regulation, and interpersonal effectiveness skills, which can counteract the intense emotional merging often seen in symbiotic dynamics. Psychodynamic therapy may be used to uncover unconscious relational patterns and internalized roles that perpetuate emotional fusion, offering insight into how these patterns developed over time.

In the context of romantic relationships, Couples therapy often incorporates Emotionally focused therapy (EFT) to restructure maladaptive attachment patterns. The goal is to build secure emotional bonds while avoiding unhealthy fusion, enabling partners to relate as distinct individuals rather than emotionally overdependent entities. Therapists facilitate open emotional communication while reinforcing the importance of individual emotional boundaries.

=== Goals of therapy ===
A key goal in treating emotional symbiosis is helping individuals establish healthy emotional boundaries. By learning to separate their own feelings from those of others, clients can develop a clearer sense of self and reduce emotional entanglement. This process helps individuals take responsibility for their own emotions and reduces the unconscious merging of emotional states.

Another important therapeutic goal is repairing attachment issues, particularly those rooted in childhood experiences. Therapists often explore early relationships to understand how early emotional bonds influence present-day dependency. EFT is commonly used to foster secure attachment patterns and encourage healthier emotional bonds.

Therapy also focuses on self-differentiation, or the ability to maintain one’s identity while being emotionally connected to others. This concept, drawn from the family systems theory, helps individuals grow more emotionally independent without disconnecting from important relationships. Achieving this balance enables people to engage with others while staying true to themselves.

== Criticisms and alternative views ==
Not all psychologists agree that emotional symbiosis is inherently problematic. Relational-cultural theory argues that mutual empathy and interdependence are vital for growth, challenging the Western ideal of radical self-sufficiency. Similarly, some feminist theorists, such as Carol Gilligan critique the pathologization of emotional closeness, noting that it often devalues traits culturally coded as feminine.
