= Feminist psychology =

Form of psychology centered on social structures and gender

Feminist psychology is a form of psychology centered on social structures and gender. Feminist psychology critiques historical psychological research as done from a male perspective with the view that males are the norm. Feminist psychology is oriented on the values and principles of feminism.

Gender issues can be broken down into many different categories and can be rather controversial. They can include the way people identify their gender (for example: male, female, genderqueer; transgender or cisgender) and how they have been affected by societal structures relating to gender (gender hierarchy), the role of gender in the individual's life (such as stereotypical gender roles) and any other gender related issues.

The main objective behind this field of study is to understand the individual within the larger social and political aspects of society. Feminist psychology places a strong emphasis on women's rights. While Psychoanalysis took shape as a clinical or therapeutic method, feminism took shape as a political strategy.

== History ==
=== Feminist psychoanalysis ===
The term feminist psychology was originally coined by Karen Horney. In her book, Feminine Psychology, which is a collection of articles Horney wrote on the subject from 1922–1937, she addresses previously held beliefs about women, relationships, and the effect of society on female psychology.

=== Functionalism, Darwinism and the psychology of women ===
The beginning of psychology research presents very little information in the way of female psychology. Many women did not fight against oppression because they did not realize they were oppressed in the first place. Once the functionalist movement came about in the United States, academic psychology's study of sex difference and a prototypical psychology of woman were developed.

=== Anti-feminism after WWII ===
In 1942 Edward Strecker made "mom-ism" an official pathological syndrome under the APA. Strecker believed that the country was under threat because mothers were not emotionally disconnecting from their children at a young enough age, and the matriarchy was making young men weak and losing their "man power". This fueled that anti-feminist movement; women were in need of psychotherapy to aid their mental illness and further prevent the spread of maternalism. The psychological damage on the family would be severe if a woman chose a career to satisfy her needs as opposed to her feminine domestic role assigned by society. A woman's happiness was not important, she must follow her role. The effect of women having independent thoughts and a thirst for exploring her options was a huge threat to gender, as it resulted in masculine women and feminized men, apparently confounding the nation's youth and dooming their future. Constantinople and Bem both agreed that men and women possess masculinity and femininity, and that having both is being psychologically androgynous and a cause to be psychologically fixed or evaluated.

== Gender research in the 1960s and 1970s ==
Esther Greenglass states that in 1972, the field of psychology was still male-dominated, women were totally excluded. The use of the word women in conjunction with psychology was forbidden, men refused to be excluded from the narrative. In her experience of teaching class, or being assistant professors, they had to phrase it in the interest of human beings or gender. Unger's paper "Toward a Redefinition of Sex and Gender" said that the use of gender showed the separation of biological and psychological sex. Psychology of women is feminist because it says women are different from men and that women's behavior cannot be understood outside of context. Feminists in turn compelled psychoanalysts to consider the implications of one of Freud's own, most uncompromising propositions: "that human beings consist of men and women and that this distinction is the most significant one that exists." In Liberating Minds: Consciousness-Raising as a Bridge Between Feminism and Psychology in 1970s Canada, Nora Ruck leads with, "U.S. radical feminist Irene Peslikis warned that equating women's liberating with individual therapy prevented women from truly understanding and fighting the roots of their oppression." Canada was one of the few countries with an academic category within psychology for feminism. They relied on CR (consciousness raising) groups to build their movement. Ruck describes the process of these CR groups by "bridging the tensions" between the personal and political. The development of CR as a political method in its own right is widely attributed to the New York-based radical feminist collective "Redstockings" (Echols, 1989). CR is also closely tied with radical feminism, which aims to weed out discrimination and segregation based on sex, and through a grassroots movement like socialist feminism, maintains that women's oppression is not a by-product of capitalist oppression but a "primary cause" (Koedt, 1968).

== Joining the workforce ==
Women were excluded from Freud's definition of mental health (the ability to love and to work) because women wanting jobs was attributed to a masculinity complex or envy of men. Between 1970 and 1980 the percentage of women working outside the home had risen from 43 to 51, in the United States. Although women reported having difficulty juggling the roles of mother and provider, they found a way to be fulfilled void of childbearing. Women continue to be a large percentage of the workforce in psychological positions. In 2013, 68.3 percent of the psychological positions in the United States of America were held by women, and as of 2019 it was 70 percent. This resulted in 2.1 women in the workforce for every 1 man, a drastic shift from Freud's previous school of thought on women in the workforce (APA, 2013). The workforce does consider semi-retired psychologists as well; however, women still overtake men when comparing active psychologists, and have less percentage than men for semi-retired and retired psychologists (APA, 2013). The Committee on Women in Psychology (CWP), was founded in 1973. It was founded with the mission " 'to advance psychology as a science and a profession...' — by ensuring that women in all their diversity achieve equality within the psychological community and in the larger society..." (APA, 2017). There are also journals that focus on women in psychology, such as SAGE, which is recognized by the APA (SAGE, 2017). SAGE journal publishes articles about the mental health of women in the workforce, and what it is like for single mothers in the country, all of which are common topics in feminism as it is (SAGE, 2017). These movements that have occurred over time show a clear shift in culture from Freud's original philosophy on mental health, where women are not only included, but are also part of every aspect of the workforce of psychology. The APA Leadership Institute for Women in Psychology emerged to support and empower women in psychological fields. Women such as Cynthia de las Fuentes are not only pushing for feminist psychology to be a more popular topic, but also do research in why some might be moving away from feminism, and by extension, feminism psychology (APA, 2006).

== Organizations ==
=== Association for Women in Psychology (AWP) ===
The Association for Women in Psychology (AWP) was created in 1969 in response to the American Psychological Association's apparent lack of involvement in the Women's Liberation Movement. The organization formed with the purpose of fighting for and raising awareness of feminist issues within the field of psychology. The association focused its efforts toward feminist representation in the APA and finally succeeded in 1973 with the establishment of APA Division 35 (the Society for the Psychology of Women).

=== Society for the Psychology of Women ===
APA Division 35, the Society for the Psychology of Women, was established in 1973. It was created to provide a place for all people interested in the psychology of women to access information and resources in the field. The society for the Psychology of Women works to incorporate feminist concerns into the teaching and practice of psychology. Division 35 also runs a number of committees, projects, and programs.

=== Section on Women and Psychology (SWAP) ===
The Canadian Psychological Association (CPA) has a section on Women and Psychology (SWAP), which is meant "to advance the status of women in psychology, promote quity for women in general, and to educate psychologists and the public on topics relevant to women and girls." SWAP supports projects such as Psychology's Feminist Voices. The Journal of Diversity in Higher Education expresses that female psychologists are often considered to be inefficient due to their low contribution in scientific productivity. Hence, women tend to dominate in low level positions than their male counterparts even if they acquire their doctoral degrees. "They did not show any acknowledgement or appreciation that there was a difference and that there was a need for it, and that was around the time that we were giving a course here interdisciplinary, not in psychology. I still didn't have a course here because they wouldn't let me do it. And the men pretty well called the shots when they told you, you can't do it, you just, you don't do it." (Greenglass, 2005).

=== The Psychology of Women Section (BPS) ===
The Psychology of Women Section (BPS), of the British Psychological Society was created in 1988 to draw together everyone with an interest in the psychology of women, to provide a forum to support research, teaching and professional practice, and to raise an awareness of gender issues and gender inequality in psychology as profession and as practice. POWS is open to all members of the British Psychological Society.

== Current research ==
=== Emotion ===
A major topic of study within feminist psychology is that of gender differences in emotion. In general, feminist psychologists view emotion as culturally controlled and state that the differences lie in the expression of emotion rather than the actual experience. The way a person shows his or her emotions is defined by socially enforced display rules which guide the acceptable forms of expression for particular people and feelings.

Stereotypes of emotion view women as the more emotional sex. However, feminist psychologists point out that women are only viewed as experiencing passive emotions such as sadness, happiness, fear, and surprise more strongly. Conversely, men are viewed to most likely to express emotions of a more dominant nature, such as anger. Feminist psychologists believe that men and women are socialized throughout their lifetimes to view and express emotions differently. From infancy mothers use more facial expression when speaking to female babies and use more emotion words in conversation with them as they get older.

Girls and boys are further socialized by peers where as girls are rewarded for being sensitive and emotional and boys are rewarded for dominance and lack of most emotional expression. Psychologists have also found that women, overall, are more skilled at decoding emotion using non-verbal cues. These signals include facial expression, tone of voice, and posture. Studies have shown gender differences in decoding ability beginning as early as age 3 1/2. The book Man and Woman, Boy and Girl looks at intersex patients in explaining why social factors are more important than biological factors in gender identity and gender roles and brought nature vs nurture issues back into the spotlight (Money & Ehrhardt, 1972).

=== Leadership ===
Social scientists in many disciplines study aspects of the "glass ceiling effect", the invisible yet powerful barriers that prevent many women from moving beyond a certain level in the workplace and other public institutions. According to the U.S. Department of Labor, women in the United States comprised 47% of the workforce in 2010. However, there are only a small number of women with high held positions in corporations. Women constitute only 5% of Fortune 500 CEOs (in 2014) and 19% of board members of S&P500 companies (in 2014), and 26% of college presidents. In 2017 U.S. government bodies, women comprise 19.1% of U.S. Representatives, 21% of U.S. Senators, 8% of state governors, and similarly low percentages of state elected officials. Women of color have lower representation than white women. The U.S. lags behind other countries in gender parity in government representation; according to the Global Gender Gap Report of 2014, the U.S. ranked 33 out of 49 so-called "high-income" countries, and 83rd out of the 137 countries surveyed. "Women affiliated with the American Academy of Psychoanalysis were among the first to pursue such subjects as women's fear of success and inclinations toward neurotic dependency. They acknowledged the cultural forces inhibiting women's progress in non-domestic realms, particularly the pressures inherent in a male-dominated society." Much scholarship focuses on structural features inhibiting women's progress in public spheres, rather than locating the source of the issue on women themselves.

In addition, women experience a "sticky floor effect". The sticky floor effect happens when women have no job path or ladder to higher positions. When women have children, they experience a roadblock called the maternal wall, which is when women receive fewer desirable assignments and fewer opportunities for advancement after they have a child. The patriarchy labels women as "nourishing facilitators" making them not mentally strong enough to take part in the aggressive male-dominated workforce without taking psychological and emotional hits. When women begin working at a company, their advancement can be limited by not having a senior level employee taking an active role in the development and career planning of junior employees. There are a lack of female mentors to assist new female employees because there are fewer women than men in higher level company positions. A woman with a male mentor could experience difficulty in gaining bonding and advice from out of work experiences. This is because men play basketball or golf and typically exclude women from these endeavors. Other factors limiting leadership for women are cultural differences, stereotypes, and perceived threats. If women show a small amount of sensitivity, they are stereotyped as being overly emotional. Generally, employers do not accept sensitive, soft people as being able to tackle tough decisions or handle leadership roles. However, if a woman displays male traits she is portrayed as mean, butch, and aggressive. Women are viewed as less competent when they showcase "non-feminine" traits and are not taken seriously. These women don't brag about their accomplishments and feel guilty for being able to go beyond stereotypes of feminine emotion and thought in order to become masculine in their jobs, just to be successful or try to be equal to men. Career women, whose professional status depends on the appropriation of masculine traits, frequently have depression. Recent research has connected the concept of stereotype threat with girls' motivations to avoid success as an individual difference, girls might avoid participation in certain male-dominated fields due to real and perceived obstacles to success in those fields, although there is little that can be proven (e.g., Spencer et al. 1999).

Another factor leading to discrimination and stress are cultural differences between managers and workers. For example, if a manager is white and has an employee of color, stress may be created if they do not understand or respect each other. Without trust and respect, advancement is unlikely. Our depiction of gender identity is white and middle class. White women are described as intelligent, manipulative, and privileged by Black women, who are described as strong, determined, and having attitude (Burack, 2002). "There it is, White fear of Black anger", was written in Ladies Home Journal (Edwards 1998: 77). Regarding perceived threats at work, it is not a matter of sexual harassment or harassment in general. The threat is the fact that women could possibly take over. The more women working in a place of employment, the increased threat a man feels over job security. In a study of 126 male managers, when asked to estimate the number of women working at their place of employment and whether or not they felt men were disadvantaged. Men who believed there were many women felt threatened about the security of their job (Beaton et al., 1996). Alice Eagly and Blair Johnson (1990) discovered that men and women have different small differences in their styles of leadership. Women in power were seen as interpersonal and more democratic, whereas men were seen as task-oriented and more autocratic. In reality, men and women are equally effective in their styles of leadership. A study by Alice Eagly (Eagly, Karau, & Makhijani, 1995) found no overall differences in the effectiveness of male and female leaders in facilitating accomplishment of their group goals.

=== Violence ===
Feminists argue that gender-based violence occurs frequently in the forms of domestic violence, sexual harassment, childhood sexual abuse, sexual assault, and rape. Violence towards women can be physical or psychological and is not limited by race, economic status, age, ethnicity, or location. Women can be abused by strangers but most often the abuser is someone the woman knows. Violence can have both short- and long-term effects on women, and they react to the abuse in various ways. Some women express emotions such as fear, anxiety, and anger. Others choose to deny it occurred and conceal their feelings. Often, women blame themselves for what happened and try to justify that they somehow deserved it. Among victims of violence, psychological disorders such as post traumatic stress disorder and depression are common. In addition to the psychological ramifications, many women also sustain physical injuries from the violence that require medical attention.

=== Relational-cultural theory ===
Relational-cultural theory is based on the work of Jean Baker Miller, whose book Toward a New Psychology of Women proposes that "growth-fostering relationships are a central human necessity and that disconnections are the source of psychological problems." Inspired by Betty Friedan's Feminine Mystique, and other feminist classics from the 1960s, relational-cultural theory proposes that "isolation is one of the most damaging human experiences and is best treated by reconnecting with other people", and that therapists should "foster an atmosphere of empathy and acceptance for the patient, even at the cost of the therapist's neutrality". The theory is based on clinical observations and sought to prove that "there was nothing wrong with women, but rather with the way modern culture viewed them".

=== Transnational Feminist Psychology ===
In 2008, Arnett pointed out that most articles in American Psychological Association journals were about US populations when U.S. citizens are only 5% of the world's population. He complained that psychologists had no basis for assuming psychological processes to be universal and generalizing research findings to the rest of the global population. In 2010, Henrich, Heine, and Norenzayan reported a systemic bias in conducting psychology studies with participants from WEIRD ("western, educated, industrialized, rich and democratic") societies. Although only 1/8 people worldwide live in regions that fall into the WEIRD classification, the researchers claimed that 60–90% of psychology studies are performed on participants from these areas. Arnett (2008), Altmaier and Hall (2008), and Morgan-Consoli et al. (2018) saw the Western bias in research and theory as a serious problem considering psychologists are increasingly applying psychological principles developed in W.E.I.R.D. regions in their research, clinical work, and consultation with populations around the world.

Kurtis, Adams, Grabe, and Else-Quest coined the term transnational feminist psychology (also called transnational psychology). The term refers to an approach that applies the principles of transnational feminism, developed through interdisciplinary work in postcolonial and feminist studies, to the field of psychology to study, understand, and address the impact of colonization, imperialism, migration, and globalization on women around the world. Kurtis and Adams proposed using these principles and a context-sensitive cultural psychology lens to reconsider, de-naturalize, and de-universalize psychological science. Grabe and Else-Quest also proposed the concept of "transnational intersectionality" that expands current conceptions of intersectionality, adding global forces to the analysis of how oppressive institutions are interconnected. Kurtis and Adams emphasized that people in the non-Western, "Majority World" (areas where the majority of the world's population lives) are important resources who can help counter Western biases and revise current theory to develop a more pluralistic psychological science. In 2015 a Summit was organized by Machizawa, Collins, and Rice to further develop "transnational psychology." Participants applied transnational psychological perspectives to research, assessment, interventions, migration, domestic violence, education, career, human trafficking, sexuality, pedagogy, and other topics in psychology.

== Feminist therapy ==
Feminist therapy is a type of therapy based on viewing individuals within their sociocultural context. The main idea behind this therapy is that the psychological problems of women and minorities are often a symptom of larger problems in the social structure in which they live. There is a general agreement that women are more frequently diagnosed with internalizing disorders such as depression, anxiety, and eating disorders than men. Feminist therapists dispute earlier theories that this is a result of psychological weakness in women and instead view it as a result of encountering more stress because of sexist practices in our culture. A common misconception is that feminist therapists are only concerned with the mental health of women. While this is certainly a central component of feminist theory, feminist therapists are also sensitive to the impact of gender roles on individuals regardless of sex. Goldman found the connection between psychoanalysis and feminism as the recognition of sexuality as preeminent in the makeup of women as well as men. Freud found that men's ideology was forced onto women in order to sexually repress them, connecting the public and private spheres for the subjugation of women. The goal of feminist therapy is the empowerment of the client. Generally, therapists avoid giving specific diagnoses or labels and instead focus on problems within the context of living in a sexist culture. Clients are sometimes trained to be more assertive and encouraged to understand their problems with the intent of changing or challenging their circumstances. Feminist therapists view lack of power as a major issue in the psychology of women and minorities. Accordingly, the client-therapist relationship is meant to be as egalitarian as possible with both sides communicating on equal ground and sharing experiences.

Feminist therapy is different from other types of therapy in that it goes beyond the idea that men and women should be treated equally in the therapeutic relationship. Feminist therapy incorporates political values to a greater extent than many other types of therapy. Also, feminist therapy encourages social change as well as personal change in order to improve the psychological state of the client and society.

=== Issues with traditional therapies ===
==== Gender biases ====
Many traditional therapies assume that women should follow sex-roles in order to be mentally healthy. They believe gender differences are biologically based and encourage female clients to be submissive, expressive, and nurturant in order to achieve fulfillment Psychotherapy is a male-dominated practice and supports women's adjustment to stereotypical gender roles instead of women's liberation. This may be done unconsciously by the therapist – for example, they may encourage a female to be a nurse, when they would have encouraged a male client of the same abilities to be a doctor, but there is the risk that the goals and outcomes of therapy will be evaluated differently in accordance with the therapist's beliefs and values. Inequality between the sexes and restrictions on sex roles are perpetuated by evolutionary psychology, but we could understand the role of gender in scientific communities by using feminist research strategies and admitting to gender bias (Fehr, 2012).

==== Androcentrism ====
Traditional therapies are based on the assumption that being male is the norm. Male traits are seen as the default, and stereotypical male traits are seen as more highly valued. Men are considered the standard of comparison when comparing gender differences, with feminine traits viewed as a deviation from the norm and a deficiency on the part of women. Psychological theories of female development were written by men who are completely uninformed by women's actual experiences and the conditions under which they lived.

==== Intrapsychic assumptions ====
Traditional therapies place little emphasis on sociopolitical influences, focusing instead on the client's internal functioning. This can lead therapists to blame clients for their symptoms, even if the client may in fact be coping admirably in a difficult and oppressive situation. Another possible issue can arise if therapists pathologize normal responses to oppressive environments.

=== Principles of empowerment ===
==== The personal is political ====
This principle stems from the belief that psychological symptoms are caused by the environment. The goal of the therapist is to separate the external from the internal so the client can become aware of the socialization and oppression they have experienced, and attribute their problems to the appropriate causes. Feminist stance is largely marginalized and seen as standing outside of mainstream psychiatry, and there is the power-based distribution of knowledge, which gives therapists the ability to label women's disorders without knowing their lived experiences.

Therapists do not view their client's cognition or behaviors as maladaptive – indeed, symptoms of depression or post traumatic stress disorder are often considered to be the normal, rational response to oppression and discrimination. Traditional therapies place little emphasis on sociopolitical influences, focusing instead on the client's internal functioning. This can lead therapists to blame clients for their symptoms, even if the client may in fact be coping admirably in a difficult and oppressive situation. Another possible issue can arise if therapists pathologize normal responses to oppressive environments.

==== Egalitarian relationships ====
Feminist therapists consider power inequalities to be a major contributing factor to the struggles of women, and as such criticize the traditional therapist role as an authority figure. Feminist therapists believe interpersonal relationships should be based in equality, and view the client as the "expert" in their own experiences. Therapists emphasize collaboration, and use techniques such as self-disclosure to reduce the power differential.

==== Value the female perspective ====
The goal of feminist therapy is to re-value feminine characteristics and perspectives. Often, women are criticized for breaking gender norms while simultaneously being devalued for acting feminine. In order to break this double bind, therapists encourage women to value the female perspective and self-define themselves and their roles. In doing so, clients can value their own characteristics, bond with other women, and embrace traits that had previously been discouraged.

=== Techniques ===
==== Sex role analysis ====
One component of feminist therapy involves a critique of cultural conditioning that produces and maintains socially biased structures. From birth, women are taught which behaviors are appropriate, and face sanctions if they fail to conform to these standards. These gender stereotypes are taught explicitly or implicitly by the family, media, school, and the workplace, and lead to gender-related belief systems and self-imposed expectations.

Before women can be free of these expectations, they need to gain an understanding of the social systems that molded and encouraged these gender stereotypes, and how this system impacted their mental health. First, women work to identify the gendered messages they've received, as well as the consequences. Then, women explore how these messages have been internalized, and decide which rules they would like to follow and which behaviors they would prefer to change.

==== Power analysis ====
Power systems are organized groups that have legitimized status, that are sanctioned by custom or law, that have the power to set the standards for society. In Western society, women are expected to conform to the power systems that place them as submissive and inferior to men. Types of power include the legal, physical, financial, and institutional ability to exert change. Often, men control direct power via concrete resources, while women are left to use indirect means and interpersonal resources. Also, sex-roles and institutionalized sexism play a role in limiting the power women have.

Power analysis is the technique used to examine the power differential between women and men, and to empower women to challenge the interpersonal and institutional inequalities they face.

==== Assertiveness training ====
Assertiveness has traditionally been associated with masculinity, which may have influenced women feeling the need to be more passive in their interactions with others. Feminist therapists work to help women distinguish assertive behaviors from passive or aggressive ones, overcome beliefs that tell women they cannot be assertive, and help women rehearse assertiveness skills through role play. Studies on the effects of assertiveness training on women have shown increases in self-esteem and confidence after training was complete.

=== Application to other theories ===
==== Cognitive-behavioral therapy ====
The biggest feminist critique of cognitive-behavioral therapy is that the theory fails to focus on how behaviors are learned from society (NetCE, 2014). Often, the focus is on encouraging women to change their "maladaptive" responses and conform to normative standards. By putting the onus on the woman to change her thoughts and behaviors, instead of changing the environmental factors that give rise to the problems, the theory fails to question the social norms that condone the oppression of women. Despite this, feminist therapists do use cognitive-behavioral techniques to help women change their beliefs and behaviors, in particular using techniques such as sex-role analysis or assertiveness training (NetCE, 2014).

==== Psychoanalytic therapy ====
Many psychoanalytic concepts are considered by feminist therapists to be sexist and culturally-bound (NetCE, 2014). However, feminist psychoanalysis adapts many of the ideas of traditional psychotherapy, including the focus on early childhood experiences and the idea of transference. Specifically, therapists serve as a mother figure and help clients connect emotionally with others while maintaining an individuated sense of self (NetCE, 2014).

==== Family systems therapy ====
The main critique of family systems therapy is the endorsement of power imbalances and traditional gender roles. For example, family systems therapists often respond to men and women differently, for example placing more importance on the man's career or placing the responsibility for childcare and housework on the mother (Braverman, 1988).

Feminist therapists strive to make the discussion of gender roles explicit in therapy, as well as focusing on the needs of and empowering the woman in her relationship (Braverman, 1988). Therapists help couples examine how gender role beliefs and power dynamics lead to conflict. The focus is on encouraging more egalitarian relationships and affirming the women's experiences (NetCE, 2014).

=== Core issues covered in therapy ===
==== Rape/domestic violence ====
A feminist approach to dealing with rape or domestic abuse is focused on empowerment. Therapists help clients analyze societal messages about rape or domestic abuse that encourage a victim-blaming attitude, and try to help clients get past shame, guilt, and self-blame. Often, women do not know the true definitions of abuse or rape, and don't immediately identify themselves as victims.

Survivors often face negative reactions from others that lead to re-victimization when trying to seek help, so therapists can help the woman navigate the medical and legal services if she wishes. At all times, although safety is the main concern, the therapist empowers the woman to explore her options and make her own decisions (for example, to leave the relationship or stay following an attack).

It is emphasized that any symptoms are in fact normal responses to the traumatic effect, and the women is not pathologized. Both rape and domestic violence are not viewed as something one can recover from, but are instead viewed as experiences that one can integrate into one's life story as one restructures one's self-esteem and self-confidence.

==== Career counseling ====
Occupational choice is a main theme in feminist counseling. Women are more likely to earn less than men and are overrepresented in lower-status occupations. Several factors influence this career trajectory, including gender-role stereotyping of which jobs are appropriate for men and women. Women are often pointed toward nurturing roles, while leadership positions are reserved for men.

Institutionalized sexism in the educational system often encourages girls to study traditionally feminine subjects while discouraging them from studying math and science. Discriminatory hiring practices also reflect the attitude that men should be the breadwinners and that women are a riskier choice because their work will be disrupted once they have children.

These societal messages often lead to internalized negative beliefs, including lower self-confidence and self-esteem, reduced assertiveness and willingness to negotiate, and impostor syndrome, where women believe they do not deserve success and are merely lucky.

When women do seek nontraditional employment, they are placed in a double bind: they are expected to be competent at their jobs while simultaneously being feminine. Especially for women in male-dominated fields, trying to be competent and successful is difficult.

== Feminist therapists ==
Feminist therapists work with women in search of counseling, as well as men, for help in alleviating a variety of mental health concerns. Feminist therapists have an interest in gender and how multiple social identities can impact an individual's functioning. Psychologists or therapists who identify with the feminism, the belief that women and men are equals, and/or feminist psychological theory may call themselves feminist therapists. Currently, there are not many postdoctoral training programs in feminist psychology, but models for this training are being developed and modified for institutions to start offering them. Most of this training is modeled around gender-fair counseling techniques.
