= Psychology's Feminist Voices =

Online multimedia digital archive

- Established: 2004
- Field of research: Psychology
- Director: Alexandra Rutherford
- Location: Toronto, Ontario, Canada
- Campus: York University
- Website: feministvoices.com

Psychology's Feminist Voices (PFV) is an online, multimedia digital archive containing the stories of women of psychology's past and contemporary feminist psychologists who have shaped and continue to transform the discipline of psychology. It houses a wide range of materials, including original biographical profiles, oral history interview transcripts, video content, timelines, bibliographies, teaching resources, and an original 40-minute documentary on the emergence and current status of feminist psychology in the United States. The project is continually expanding and currently has a database containing the profiles of over 250 psychologists from around the world.

PFV is also an online teaching resource, with sample syllabi for teaching history of psychology from a feminist perspective, teaching guides for incorporating PFV material into history and psychology of gender courses, assignments, handouts, and teaching videos.

PFV is a free resource and all interview transcripts are downloadable as .pdf files; all video content is available at the site and at the psychsfeministvoices YouTube channel; all interview transcripts are copyrighted to Feminist Voices except where indicated.

== History ==
The Psychology's Feminist Voices project was founded by Alexandra Rutherford in 2004. It began as a collection of oral histories with contemporary feminist psychologists, many of whom established the field of feminist psychology in the United States and Canada in the early 1970s. It quickly expanded, however, to encompass a larger goal: the documentation of women throughout psychology's history, as well as a large and diverse sample of feminist psychologists in order to create a comprehensive picture of the impact of gender, women's participation, and feminism, on the development of psychology as a science and profession. The online resource, www.feministvoices.com, was launched in 2010 and now has a corresponding Facebook site, YouTube channel, and Twitter feed.

This project is based at York University, Toronto, Canada. It has received funding from the Social Sciences and Humanities Research Council of Canada, and has been endorsed by the Society for the Psychology of Women, Division 35 of the American Psychological Association (APA), the Society for the History of Psychology, Division 26 of the APA, the Section on Women and Psychology of the Canadian Psychological Association, and the Association for Women in Psychology.

== Structure ==
The Psychology's Feminist Voices digital archive has two main sections: Women Past (1848–1950) and Feminist Presence (1950–present). The Women Past section contains profiles of women who received their doctoral degrees in psychology before 1950. The Feminist Presence section features profiles of and interviews with self-identified feminist psychologists who received their doctorates after 1950. Both sections contain the following subsections:

Profiles: Each psychologist has a profile page containing their training, affiliations, biographies, media links, photographs, and a list of selected works. The Feminist Presence profiles also usually include transcripts and video clips of interviews conducted by the PFV team.

Timeline: Provides a chronology of major events in feminist history and psychology, beginning with the 1848 Seneca Falls Convention up to recent breakthroughs such as the publication of the report on the trafficking of women and girls by The Society for the Psychology of Women Special Committee.

Resources: Includes bibliographies, teaching materials, websites, and archives with relevant collections. All of these resources are meant to serve as starting points for teaching and research on the history of women in psychology and science, as well as the history of feminism. An original teaching video series, "Feminist Psychologists Talk About...", is also featured. The first video in the series is on women's mental health and feminist therapy.

Search Page: The content of the site is searchable by keyword, name, birth and death dates, training location, and affiliation. This page also includes a rotating banner of "Featured Psychologists".

=== Additional content ===
Video Resources: The Changing Face of Feminist Psychology is an original documentary that uses archival material and interviews to explore the context in which feminist psychology emerged and how it has shaped the field of psychology. Original interview clips from individual psychologists can also be found on PFV's YouTube channel.
