= Attachment-based psychotherapy =

Psychoanalytic psychotherapy based on attachment theory

Attachment-based psychotherapy is a psychoanalytic psychotherapy that is informed by attachment theory.

Attachment-based psychotherapy combines the epidemiological categories of attachment theory (including the identification of the attachment styles such as secure, anxious, ambivalent and disorganized/disoriented) with an analysis and understanding of how dysfunctional attachments get represented in the human inner world and subsequently re-enacted in adult life. Attachment-based psychotherapy is the framework of treating individuals with depression, anxiety, and childhood trauma. Psychotherapy, or talk therapy, can help to alleviate dysfunctional emotions caused by attachment disorders, such as jealousy, rage, rejection, loss, and commitment issues that are brought on by the lack of response from a parent or the loss of a loved one. Events, such as domestic abuse or lack of a parental figure, can result in these dysfunctional emotions. These issues can also have effects of the child in their adulthood, by making them incapable of making and keeping healthy relationships or by making them have false beliefs that they will be abandoned. The use of Psychotherapy helps modify dysfunctional emotions in order to give the patient a healthy understanding of the traumatic experiences they have gone through. It is important for psychotherapists dealing with Attachment disorders to create a personal relationship with the patient in order to help the patient to make intimate attachments in their normal lives. Effective psychotherapy for patients dealing with attachment disorders must be supportive and consist of effective communication between the patient and therapist. Child attachment trauma leads into attachment issues as an adult. Individuals with attachment problems may show signs of distress during difficult situations, have trouble caring for others and letting themselves be cared for, are easily angered, and have difficulty focusing.

When an individual does not have security in their relationships, they rely on themselves and their emotions, resulting in unhealthy behavior and cognitive functioning.

== Treatment ==
Therapists apply psychotherapy to patients with attachment disorders by applying a method of listening and reflecting on the experiences of the patient that caused their difficulty in making emotional connections. The primary treatment for a child with attachment-based trauma is having a reliable caregiver. The next most important treatment is having a psychotherapist. The therapist's objective is to get the patient to open up to them so the patient can explore the experiences that are causing them to have dysfunctional relationships and to recreate the experience from the point of view of the therapist in order to resolve any emotional or social disruptions within the patient's life. According to Dan Hughes this process is known as “attunement, disruption, and repair”. The first part of the treatment, the attunement, consists of the forging of a personal relationship between the therapist and the patient, it is the first step for the patient toward creating healthy attachments. Attachment patients live stressful lives with very little emotional attachments to people, thus it is the therapist's job to create a secure, accepting, caring, non-judgmental, and reliable environment where the patient can feel comfortable sharing their most traumatic experiences.

Once the patient and therapist have created a trust worthy and reliable relationship the therapist will probe the patient on any traumatic experiences that may have happened to them in their childhood and that connect to any disruptions in their lives at the time. The therapist pays special attention to the relationship between the patient and their parents because the lack of responsiveness of a parent early in a child development can lead to dysfunctional relationships later on in their life. The therapist may even ask the parent or caregiver to attend the therapy sessions in order to correct any complications in their relationship. The therapist will ask the parent to be present if they want to help the child and parent repair their relationship. The therapist will facilitate in their communication and have them share in an “affective/reflective” way. Having the parent in the room, such as in group therapy, may also help the patient face the root of their problems, which most psychologists believe stems from the parents. In this sense the parent or care giver will be taking on the role of the therapist in order to resolve issue that directly impact the parent's life This part of the therapy treatment is called disruptive because by having the patients talk about their traumatic experiences and relationship with their parents in depth, the therapist is getting them to re-experience the trauma. Getting the patient to face their own trauma has the effect of getting them to accept their own ego and understand why they have trouble creating healthy attachments with people. As the patient shares their experiences the therapist is expected to be actively listening and express empathy and acceptance to the patient. The therapist creates an even deeper relationship with the patient by treating the patient's experiences as their own experiences and coming up with their own interpretations to the events while constantly be understanding of and engaged with the patient. The therapist may also mimic the patient's emotions in order to show their understanding and to encourage the patient to keep sharing.

After the patient shares the traumatic events from their life and the therapist integrates them as their own, the therapist begins the repair of the patient. The repair stage of the therapy aims to alter the patient's current reactions to the events that cause them emotional distress by sharing their own interpretations of the event. By sharing their own subjective interpretation they hope create a new reality of the traumatic events for the patient in order to get rid of unwanted emotions.

== See also ==
- Attachment in children – Biological instinct
- Attachment in adults – Application of the theory of attachment to adults
- Attachment measures – Psychological technique
- Affectional bond – Attachment behavior one person has for another
- Human bonding – Process of development of a close, interpersonal relationship
- Object relations theory – School of psychoanalytic thought
- Reactive attachment disorder – Psychological disorder that can affect children
