= Fathers as attachment figures =

Studies have found that the father is a child's preferred attachment figure in approximately 5–20% of cases. Fathers and mothers may react differently to the same behaviour in an infant, and the infant may react to the parents' behaviour differently depending on which parent performs it.

== Theoretical perspectives ==
=== Psychoanalytic theory ===
Sigmund Freud postulated that early in life, a young infant's primary attachment object would be its mother because the mother fulfills the infant's oral desires through feeding. However, he believed that the father begins to play an important role in development when the child enters the phallic stage of development, which generally occurs approximately at the age of three. According to Sigmund Freud, during the phallic stage, children begin to form an incestuous desire for their opposite-sex parent and an antagonistic rivalry with their same-sex parent. The resolution of this stage of development occurs when the child, usually at the age of six, renounces their desire for their opposite-sex parent and begins to identify with their same-sex parent.

== Predictors and correlations of father-child attachment ==
=== The child ===
==== Gender ====
Male children are more likely to prefer their father as an attachment figure than female children are.

==== Age ====
Children are more likely to be attached to their father during their late childhood to early adolescence. Infants and young adults are less likely to seek attachment to their fathers.

==== Temperament ====
The infant's temperament can influence the role that the father plays in child rearing. A great deal of research has shown that fathers are less likely to be involved with their infant if the infant has a difficult temperament. Furthermore, one study suggests that this lack of paternal involvement in the case of fussy infants may harm the mother's relationship with her child if the mother believes that the paternal care giving role is important.

=== The father ===
==== Paternal sensitivity ====
Research on whether or not paternal sensitivity has an effect on the security of father-child attachment has produced mixed results. Some studies have shown significant correlations between paternal sensitivity and secure father-child attachments. One study suggests that a father's sensitivity while playing with his child is as important to the child-father attachment relationship as maternal sensitivity during caregiving is for the child-mother attachment relationship. Furthermore, one study has found that the harm of a father's frightening behaviours on a child's future development can be mitigated if the father also has high levels of paternal sensitivity. Having a father who is both insensitive and exhibits frightening behaviours during infancy has been linked to emotional under-regulation at the age of two as well as attention problems at the age of seven. However, other studies have failed to find a correlation between paternal sensitivity and infant-father attachment.

==== The father's own attachment style ====
The level of attachment security that a father had with his parents when he was a child may influence his own child's attachment security in the sense that his child may end up having a similar level of attachment security. However, this effect is most likely to occur when the father has sole custody of his child. The father's level of attachment security in his adult relationships may also have an indirect effect on the child-father attachment. This is because fathers who have a secure attachment style in adult relationships tend to have lower levels of parenting stress, lower levels of abuse potential, and a greater amount of knowledge about child development. Lower levels of parenting stress particularly have been found to be correlated with higher levels of attachment security in the father-child attachment relationship.

==== The father's beliefs about the importance of paternal caregiving ====
A father playing poker with his son, October 1938.

One study has found that whether or not the father's beliefs about the importance of paternal caregiving affect the security of the father-child attachment relationship depends on the temperament of the child. Fathers who believe that the paternal caregiving role is important are only more likely to have securely attached infants in the case of very fussy infants. The authors of this study suggest that the reason that this finding is limited to fussy infants could be because difficult children may be more susceptible to both the positive and the negative effects of their rearing environments than non-difficult children.

=== Family context ===
==== Spousal factors ====
Two important spousal factors have been found to have a relationship with father-infant attachment security: marital intimacy and supportive co-parenting. In the case of marital intimacy, research has shown that a higher level of marital intimacy is correlated with a more secure father-infant attachment relationship, and that deteriorating marital intimacy is correlated with negative father-child interaction. In terms of supportive co-parenting, one study has found that both observed and self-reported supportive co-parenting predict a more secure father-infant attachment, even after controlling for father sensitivity. This study did not find a correlation between supportive co-parenting and the mother-infant attachment relationship. However, when the infants in this study were divided by gender and analyzed separately, the results were quite different. When the infant was a boy, observed supportive co-parenting was associated with greater mother-infant attachment security and self-reported supportive co-parenting was related to greater father-infant attachment security. When the infant was a girl, supportive co-parenting was related to neither the infant-mother attachment security nor the infant-father attachment security. The authors of this study suggest that one possible explanation for this gender difference is that parents might try to hide their marital conflict more from their daughters than from their sons causing sons to be more sensitive to differences in whether or not their parents engage in supportive co-parenting.

==== Time spent with infant ====
Research has found that fathers who spend more time with their infants tend to have more positive interactions with them, which helps foster the attachment security of the infant. Fathers who work more hours are less likely to have securely attached infants.

== Unique properties ==
Generally, research has found that, compared to mothers, fathers tend to fill more of a "play-mate" role for their children, rather than a "caregiver" role. Various studies have found that fathers are more likely than mothers to encourage risk-taking and exploration in their children by engaging their young children in physical play and initiating games that are both unpredictable and enjoyable. Most infants tend to prefer contact with their mothers when they are distressed and seeking comfort, and contact with their fathers when they are in more positive emotional states and seeking play. Furthermore, a study on frightening behaviours has suggested that young children may internalize interactions with their mother and father differently in a way that reflects these different roles. The study found that when sensitive fathers engage in frightening behaviours, the paternal sensitivity mitigates the negative effects of frightening behaviours, however, when mothers engage in frightening behaviours, maternal sensitivity does not mitigate the negative effects. Some researchers believe that this occurs because frightening behaviours are more compatible with the father's play-mate role than they are with the mother's role of providing comfort when the child is distressed. They suggest that it may be more harmful to a child when the person who the child is supposed to go to when distressed is the one who is causing the distress. In fact, these researchers believe that children may respond more positively to frightening behaviours exhibited by the father when their mother is nearby, although this has yet to be proven. Research has shown that fathers, compared to mothers, are less able to detect low levels of infant distress, which may contribute to the mother's greater tendency to fulfill more of a "caregiving" role for the child. However, when fathers are required to act as caregivers for their child, such as in situations when the mother is working, they soon become very capable in fulfilling all of the responsibilities that traditionally belong to the mother, and they even begin to serve as a secure base for their child when the child explores its environment.

== Effects of father-child attachment on future development ==
=== Secure vs. insecure attachment to father ===
Children who have a secure attachment to their father tend to have improved developmental outcomes in a variety of ways including having improved social abilities with their peers, having fewer problem behaviours, and the paternal effects on developing a greater level of emotional self-regulation are especially significant. Furthermore, one study found that 11–13 month old infants who were securely attached to their fathers were more sociable with strangers in the Strange Situation Test. The mother-infant attachment security, on the other hand, had no effect on sociability with strangers in this study. In addition, having a secure father-child attachment relationship can help compensate for potentially harmful effects resulting from an insecure mother-child attachment relationship.

=== Absent father/no attachment ===
One study has found that paternal absence has various negative effects on children. These negative effects include lower levels of school achievement, heightened risk-taking behaviours, and higher levels of aggression in boys. Another study found that male infants who have little to no interaction with their fathers have significantly lower levels of social responsiveness, fewer secondary circular reactions, and lower levels of preferences for novel stimuli, while female infants were unaffected by the absence of their father. This second study, however, only looks at mother-only single-parent families in low socioeconomic circumstances so the results may not be generalizable to the greater population.
