= Rosjke Hasseldine =

Dutch-New Zealand-American author

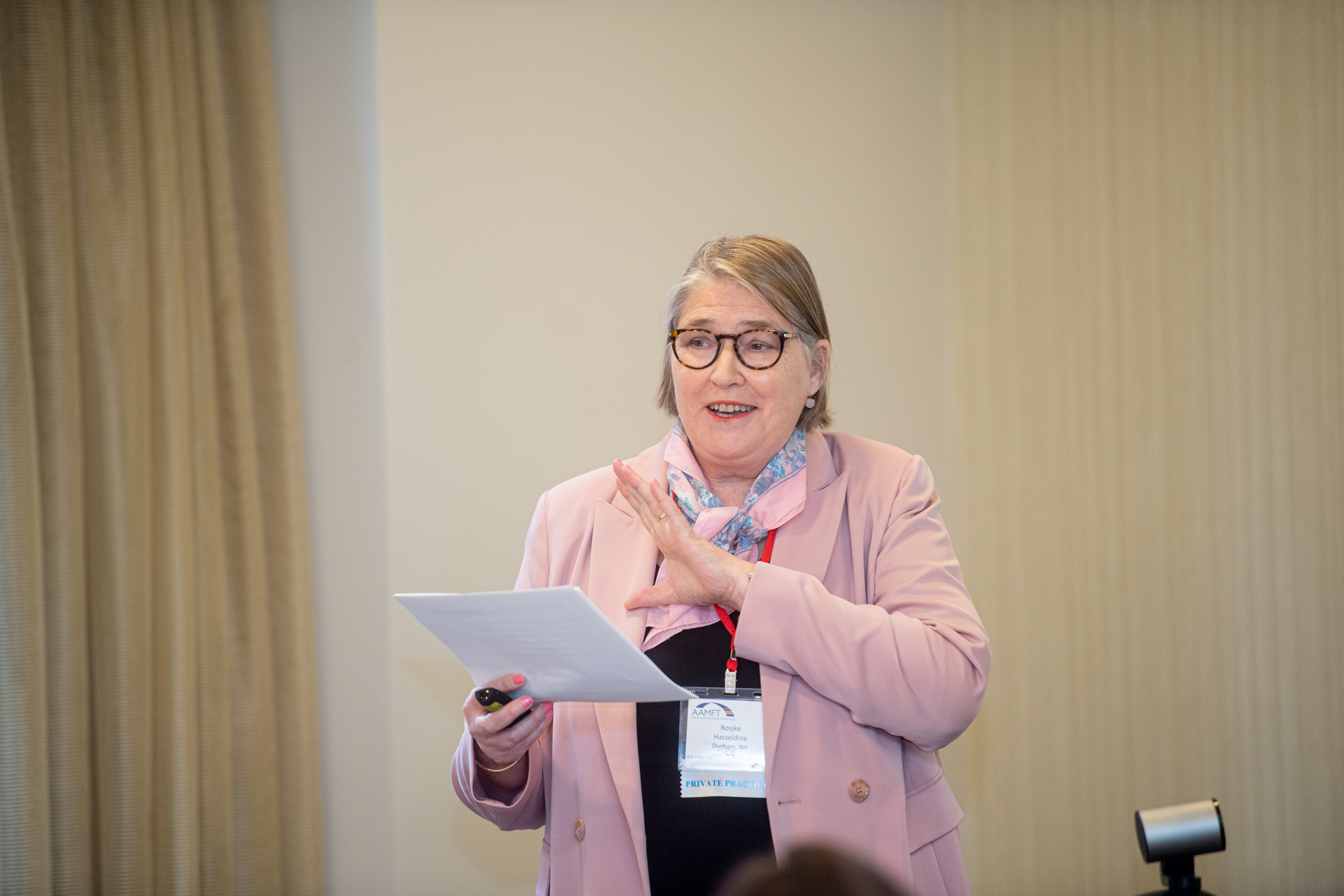
- Rosjke presenting at 2023 AAMFT Leadership Symposium, New Orleans
- Born: 1962 (age 63–64); Otematata, New Zealand
- Education: University of Canterbury, Indiana University Bloomington
- Occupations: Author, mother–daughter therapist/coach
- Known for: Mother–Daughter Attachment Model
- Website: rosjke.com motherdaughtercoach.com

Rosjke Hasseldine is a Dutch–New Zealand–American author, mother–daughter therapist/coach, and speaker, known for her research and practice in the field of mother-daughter relationships, and creating the Mother-Daughter Attachment Model, a systemic trauma-informed model that helps women understand the underlying dynamics in their mother-daughter relationship, the causes of relationship conflict, inherited generational themes, and generational trauma. She founded a training organization called Mother–Daughter Coaching International that trains mental health professionals and coaches about mother-daughter attachment dynamics, and she is a blogger on Medium and the author of The Silent Female Scream and The Mother Daughter Puzzle.

== Career ==
Hasseldine was born and raised in New Zealand by Dutch immigrants and started her career as an elementary school teacher in Christchurch, and earned a Bachelor of Education from the University of Canterbury. Hasseldine moved to Bloomington, Indiana in 1993 and earned her M.S. in Counseling and Counselor Education from Indiana University Bloomington in 1997. Since 1998 she has been an accredited member of the British Association for Counselling and Psychotherapy. After shifting to the U.K. she set up a counselling practice specializing in women and mothers and daughters, seeing them individually or as a mother-daughter couple. She worked as a counsellor for Nottingham Trent University between 1998 and 2001. Her first book The Silent Female Scream was published in 2007 and cited in Melissa Shani Brown's doctoral research on silence.

In 2011 Hasseldine returned to the U.S. where her second book The Mother-Daughter Puzzle: A new generational understanding of the mother-daughter relationship was published in 2017. Gillian Alban's review in Journal of the Motherhood Initiative concludes that until the primal relationship between mother and daughter is investigated, the problems facing women in the world will remain unsolved, writing:

"Hasseldine makes no concessions to traditional gender perceptions that silence women and their emotional needs. Nor does she tolerate the general mother blame that permeates our societies, placing the new generation’s needs over the wholeness and completeness of those who have gone before and suffered. She asserts that the relationships between mothers and daughters are entirely central to a healthy life not only for women but for society as a whole."

In 2017 Hasseldine taught the Women in Leadership course as an adjunct professor at Paul College of Business & Economics at the University of New Hampshire and also founded Mother-Daughter Coaching International to provide training and resources for mental health professionals and relationship coaches on how to heal mother-daughter conflict and trauma. Her therapeutic approach in dealing with mother-daughter intergenerational trauma is grounded on the mother-daughter bond being a unique relationship, distinct from other parent-child relationships, and by neuroscience research using brain imaging that supports mothers and daughters being wired for connection. Hasseldine has published in professional psychotherapy journals and spoken at several conferences including side events of the United Nations' 61st and 62nd Commissions on the Status of Women and family therapy conferences on the causes of mother-daughter conflict.

=== Mother–daughter attachment model ===
Hasseldine's major contribution to counseling theory and practice has been the development of the Mother-Daughter Attachment Model. This model suggests that conflict between mothers and daughters is caused by sexism and patriarchy, self-less mother roles, generational trauma, and is exacerbated by social media. These causes are represented in the hurt, jealousy, guilt and shame that clients experience and are made worse by the rise in the use of mother-blaming in society. In this sense Hasseldine has followed on from and continued the pioneering work of Carol Gilligan, Lyn Mikel Brown, Jean Baker Miller, Paula Caplan and Susie Orbach. The model allows therapists and coaches to use practical tools and exercises, including mother-daughter history mapping, a modified genogram exercise, so that women can be helped to understand their female history, facilitate individual, relationship and generational change, and heal generational trauma.

The Mother–daughter attachment model has impacted the clinical field of mother-daughter attachment in terms of family functioning as an intergenerational model with three primary clinical intervention implications as noted by Marquez et al. in the area of Mexican-American mothers and daughters with obesity.

== Publications ==
=== Journal articles ===
- Hasseldine, R. "The Future of Mother-Daughter Coaching", Coaching Perspectives, Association for Coaching, (April 2024) pages 12–13
- Hasseldine, R. "Reducing Conflict between Mothers and Daughters as the Teenage Years Emerge", Context, Family Therapy and Systemic Practice Organization UK, (October 2023) pages 28–30
- Hasseldine, R. "Don’t Blame the Mother", Healthcare Counselling and Psychotherapy Journal, British Association for Counselling and Psychotherapy, (April 2022) pages 8–12
- Hasseldine, R. "Coaching In Practice: Mother-Daughter Coaching", Coaching Today, British Association for Counselling and Psychotherapy, (July 2021) pages 16–17
- Hasseldine, R. "Is Mother-Daughter Therapy A Thing?", Context, Association for Family Therapy and Systemic Practice UK, (April 2021) pages 19–22
- Hasseldine, R. "The Mother-Daughter Puzzle", Therapy Today, British Association for Counselling and Psychotherapy, (July 2020) pages 28–31
- Hasseldine, R. "The Root Cause of Mother-Daughter Conflict", Counseling Today, American Counseling Association, (January 2020) pages 46–50
- Hasseldine, R. "Maintaining and Nurturing a Group Therapy Culture in a University Counselling Centre", Association for University and College Counselling Newsletter & Journal, (August 2000) pages 11–13
- Hasseldine, R. "Creating a Group Culture within the University Setting: A case study", Association for University and College Counselling Newsletter & Journal, (November 1999) pages 12–14
