= Alexandra Rutherford =

Is a psychology professor at York University and author of Beyond the Box

- Occupations: professor, author, editor

Academic background
- Education: York University
- Thesis: Between the science of behavior and the art of living: B. F. Skinner and psychology’s public in mid-20th century America (2001)

Academic work
- Discipline: Psychology
- Institutions: York University
- Main interests: Psychology and Feminism, history of psychology
- Notable works: Beyond the Box: B. F. Skinner's Technology of Behavior from Laboratory to Life, 1950s-1970s Pioneers of Psychology

Alexandra Rutherford is a professor of psychology at York University's History and Theory of Psychology Graduate Program and author of Beyond the Box: B. F. Skinner's Technology of Behavior from Laboratory to Life, 1950s-1970s and Pioneers of Psychology.

== Education ==
Rutherford earned her Bachelor of Science with High Distinction in 1993 from Trinity College at the University of Toronto in 1993. She completed her Master of Arts in Clinical Psychology at York University in 1995 and her PhD in the History and Theory of Psychology and Clinical Psychology at York University in 2001.

== Career ==
Since 2001, Rutherford has been teaching in the psychology department at York University, first as assistant professor, from 2006 as associate professor, and later as full professor.

In 2004, Rutherford founded The Psychology's Feminist Voices project which resulted in the launching of Psychology's Feminist Voices—an online, digital archive of the contributions made by women throughout the history of psychology, including the role of contemporary feminist psychologists in transforming the discipline of psychology.

== Research ==
In 2017, her research examined the "influence of feminist-scholar activism on gender-based violence policy in the United States."

== Publications ==
Her 2009 book, an historical critical work on American psychologist and behaviorist, B. F. Skinner—Beyond the Box: B. F. Skinner's Technology of Behavior from Laboratory to Life, 1950s-1970s —was largely based on her doctoral dissertation entitled "Between the science of behavior and the art of living: B. F. Skinner and psychology’s public in mid-20th century America." Beyond the Box was listed as the London Times Higher Education's "Book of the week—July 16-July 23, 2009. A 2018 journal review, described Beyond the Box, as a "much-needed post-revisionist interpretation" of Skinner situating his work within its "social context".

In Pioneers of Psychology, which Rutherford co-authored with Raymond E. Fancher, they examined Sigmund Freud's in-depth interpretation in his book The Interpretation of Dreams, of his own July 23, 1895 dream—Irma's injection.

In her 2011 review of Susan Brownmiller's 1975 Against Our Will: Men, Women and Rape published in the Psychology of Women Quarterly, Rutherford wrote that prior to Brownmiller's book, most Americans had assumed that "rape, incest and domestic violence rarely happened and that when they did, they were perpetrated by a few sexual deviants." In the 1970s, American second-wave feminists coined the term "rape culture".

== Media ==
Rutherford appeared as an expert on Skinner, on the August 28, 2019 episode, "A History of Persuasion", on WNYC Studios' On the Media hosted by Kai Wright and reported by Amanda Aronczyk.
