= Jonathan Miller (businessman) =

American businessman

Jonathan F. Miller
- Born: 1957 (age 68–69)
- Occupation: Media executive
- Spouse: Myriam Barenbaum
- Parent(s): Jean Baker Miller; S. M. Miller
- Family: Edward D. Miller (brother)

Jonathan F. Miller (born 1957) was CEO of Digital Media at News Corp until 2012 and was the chairman and CEO of America Online from 2002 to 2006.

== Early life and education ==
Miller is the son of Jean Baker Miller and S. M. Miller. His father was an emeritus professor of sociology at Boston University; his mother was a psychiatrist and author. He has one brother, Dr. Edward D. Miller.

== Career ==
From 1987 to 1993, Miller was vice president of programming and NBA Entertainment for the National Basketball Association. From 1993 to 1997, he was managing director of Nickelodeon International, (a unit of Viacom's MTV Networks). In 1997 he joined USA Networks as manager of its local television stations. From 2000 to 2002, Miller ran the Internet operations of Barry Diller's USA Networks, (now IACI and Expedia).

In August 2002, when he was brought into AOL by Richard D. Parsons, he was relatively unknown. Miller pursued a strategy of cutting costs and focusing on improving ad revenues over AOL's then-dominant subscription business. In 2004, Miller oversaw the $435 million acquisition of Advertising.com In 2006, he presided over layoffs of 5,000 people at AOL. He bought Weblogs, Inc., and brought Jason Calacanis to AOL, and later invested in Mahalo.com. He considered buying Facebook and YouTube. In November 2006, he was replaced by Randy Falco. Miller led the company's change from a subscription-based model to an advertising-supported model.

After his departure from AOL, Time Warner invoked a non-compete clause to prevent him serving on the Yahoo board of directors. In 2008, he was looking for funding for a takeover of Yahoo, but was unsuccessful.

In March 2009 Miller joined News Corp as Chief Digital Officer to "oversee the broad strategic digital initiatives." Miller was CEO of Digital Media at News Corp, including Fox Interactive Media and Hulu, until his departure in August 2012.

In February 2018, he partnered with Private equity firm TPG Capital, to acquire Fandom. Miller was named co-chairman of Wikia, Inc., alongside Jimmy Wales, and TPG Capital director Andrew Doyle assumed the role of interim CEO. They acquired TV Guide, and Metacritic. He was named CEO of Integrated Media Co., a subsidiary of TPG Capital.

== Directorships ==
As of 2009, Miller was on the board of directors of Clickable, Idearc Media, Mahalo, Kosmix, YP Holdings, LLC and Hanley Wood, LLC. He was an advisor to General Atlantic LLC. In 2010, he was on the board of Ticketmaster, and Live Nation. In 2012, he served on the boards of TripAdvisor and Shutterstock.

== Awards ==
Miller received the first Pioneer Prize in 2006, for his contributions to the field of interactive television at the International Interactive Emmy Awards at Mip TV in Cannes.

== Personal life ==
Miller is married to Myriam Barenbaum. They have a son, Jake.

Business positions
Preceded by Robert W. Pittman	CEO of AOL; 2002–2006	Succeeded by Randy Falco
