= Seymour M. Miller =

American sociologist and activist (1922–2021)

- Born: November 21, 1922; Philadelphia, PA
- Died: October 25, 2021 (aged 98); New York City
- Education: Princeton University Columbia University
- Occupation: Sociologist Activist Author
- Spouse: Jean Baker Miller
- Children: Jonathan F. Miller Edward D. Miller

Seymour Michael "Mike" Miller (1922–2021) was an economic-political sociologist, activist, and emeritus professor of sociology at Boston University.

== Biography ==
Miller's parents immigrated separately as teenagers from Tagancha and Stepanitz, two shtetls in Ukraine. Miller grew up poor in Philadelphia and New York with prolonged periods of homelessness.

A graduate of Brooklyn College, Princeton University and Columbia University, Miller taught for many years at Boston University in its Sociology Department, where he also chaired the department. Miller has also held distinguished research and teaching positions at numerous other universities, including Brooklyn College (1961–63), Syracuse University (1961–65), Boston College, New York University, the London School of Economics, Cornell University, and Harvard University.

Miller co-founded Ideas for Action in the late 1940s, a magazine that brought social science ideas to union and community activists. He helped found Social Policy and remained a contributing editor for three decades. During the Civil Rights Movement of the 1960s, he organized and chaired a social science advisory committee to the Congress of Racial Equality (CORE). He also joined the Ford Foundation, and initiated the Foundation's support of Latino advocacy groups and grants to CORE, the National Urban League, and the Southern Christian Leadership Conference (SCLC). He wrote speeches for Martin Luther King Jr., as well as the economic policy appendix in Where Do We Go from Here: Chaos or Community?, King's 1967 Annual Report to the SCLC. He was also active in the areas of welfare rights and anti-poverty policies.

Miller was involved with national policy creation, community organizations, and consulting in China, Ireland, Israel, France, Great Britain, Hungary, Malaysia, the Soviet Union, and the United States. Miller was also a consultant or advisor to numerous international organizations, including the Comparative Research Program on Poverty, the International Social Science Council, the Organisation for Economic Co-operation and Development, the Home Office, Transitional Employment Enterprises, ATD-Le Quart Monde, and other national and local poverty organizations. The European Union's poverty policy is based on his perspectives.

Miller's contributions to academic sociology included the concepts of fieldwork over-rapport, educational credentialism, and identifying the birth of neoliberal ideology. Miller was especially well known for his writing on inequality. For example, in 1970, Miller and Roby published the book The Future of Inequality, in which they criticized the notion that poverty is only a matter of economic insufficiency. They argued that if the United States was to satisfy the needs of the poor, poverty had to be viewed as an issue of inequality rather than simply physical survival. They also broke away from the narrow concentration on income to closely examine other pressing dimensions of inequality such as the distribution of assets, basic services, opportunity for education and social mobility, participation in decision making, and self-respect. They maintained that these social and economic inequities were the roots of the grave problems facing America, and identified social policies and political coalitions that could reduce them. In Recapitalizing America, Miller and Donald Tomaskovic-Devey described the large shift in American political economy that would later come to be called neo-liberalism and correctly predicted it would exacerbate inequalities and stall progress toward a more equal opportunity society.

== Personal life ==
Miller was married to psychiatrist and author Jean Baker Miller, and together they had two sons, Dr. Edward D. Miller, professor of media culture at the College of Staten Island/CUNY and coordinator of film studies at the Graduate Center/CUNY; and Jonathan F. Miller, CEO of Integrated Media. He died on October 25, 2021.

== Honors and awards ==
Miller was a Wyman Fellow in Economics and Social Institutions, Princeton University (1945–46), associate editor, American Sociological Review (1966–69), Guggenheim Fellow, senior fellow of the Commonwealth Institute, former chair of Boston University's Sociology Department, co-founder and board member of United for a Fair Economy (1995–2021), co-founder and first President of the Research Committee 19 on Poverty, Social Welfare, and Social Policy of the International Sociological Association (1966–1974), board member of the Field Foundation, President for the Society for the Study of Social Problems (1975–1976), President of the Eastern Sociological Society (1971–1972), and board member of the Poverty and Race Research Action Council. He is the recipient of the 2009 American Sociological Association's Award for the Practice of Sociology., chair of the social science advisory committee to the Congress of Racial Equality (CORE), and board member of the Poverty and Race Research Action Council. Working at the Ford Foundation (1966–1973), he initiated grants to Latino advocacy groups, the Southern Christian Leadership Conference (SCLC), and CORE. Miller is the recipient of the American Sociological Association's 2009 Distinguished Career in Sociological Practice Award.

== Published works ==
Miller has authored, coauthored, or edited ten books and more than three hundred articles for publications including the Steelworkers Bulletin, American Sociological Review, Nation of Change, Truthout, Dissent Magazine, AlterNet, Classism.org, and Social Policy. He was frequently quoted in the media and liked to write for general audiences, including a regular column for the British magazine New Society. In 1960, for Current Sociology (Vol. IX, No. 1; entire issue), Miller wrote the first comparative study of social mobility, "Comparative Social Mobility: A Trend Report,” pointing out that, contrary to the myth, the rate of downward mobility frequently exceeds the level of upward mobility.

His books include:

S. M. Miller (editor), Max Weber: A Reader (1963).

S. M. Miller and Alvin W. Gouldner (editors), Applied Sociology: Opportunities and Problems (1966).

S. M. Miller and Frank Riessman (editors), Social Class and Social Policy (1968).

S. M. Miller and Pamela Roby (authors), The Future of Inequality (1970).

S. M. Miller and Donald Tomaskovic-Devey (authors), Recapitalizing America: Alternatives to the Corporate Distortion of National Policy (1983).

Zsuzsa Ferge and S.M. Miller (editors), Dynamics of Deprivation (1987).

Else Oyen, S. M. Miller, and Syed Abdus Samad (editors), Poverty: A Global Review: Handbook on International Poverty Research (1996).

S. M. Miller and Anthony J. Savoie (authors), Respect and Rights: Class, Race, and Gender Today (2002).

S. M. Miller, No Permanent Abode: Autobiographical Writings (2019, Introduction by Pamela Roby).
