= Journal of Diversity in Higher Education =

- Discipline: Psychology
- Language: English
- Edited by: Kimberly A. Griffin

Publication details
- History: 2008-present
- Publisher: American Psychological Association (USA)
- Frequency: Quarterly
- Impact factor: 2.703 (2020)

Standard abbreviations
- ISO 4: J. Divers. High. Educ.

Indexing
- ISSN: 1938-8926 (print); 1938-8934 (web)

Links
- Journal homepage; Online access

The Journal of Diversity in Higher Education is a peer-reviewed academic journal published by the American Psychological Association on behalf of the National Association of Diversity Officers in Higher Education. The journal, established in 2008, "offers research findings, theory, and promising practices to help guide the efforts of institutions of higher education in the pursuit of inclusive excellence." The current editor-in-chief is Kimberly A. Griffin of the University of Maryland, College Park.

== Abstracting and indexing ==
According to the Journal Citation Reports, the journal has a 2020 impact factor of 2.703.

The journal is also indexed in the Social Sciences Citation Index, Journals@Ovid, ERIC, and Current Contents.
