= Attachment theory =

Psychological ethological theory

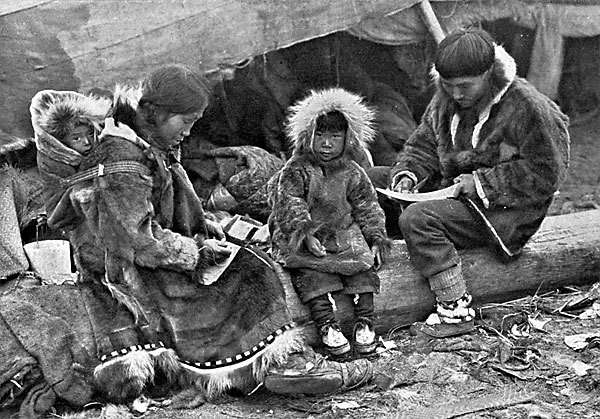
For infants and toddlers, the "set-goal" of the hypothesized behavioural system is to maintain or achieve proximity to attachment figures, usually the parents.

Attachment theory is a psychological and evolutionary framework concerning the relationships between humans, particularly the importance of early bonds between infants and their primary caregivers. Developed by psychiatrist and psychoanalyst John Bowlby (1907–90), the theory posits that infants need to form a close relationship with at least one primary caregiver to ensure their survival, and to develop healthy social and emotional functioning.

Pivotal aspects of attachment theory include the observation that infants seek proximity to attachment figures, especially during stressful situations. Secure attachments are formed when caregivers are sensitive and responsive in social interactions, and consistently present, particularly between the ages of six months and two years. As children grow, they use these attachment figures as a secure base from which to explore the world and return to for comfort. The interactions with caregivers form patterns of attachment, which in turn create internal working models that influence future relationships. Separation anxiety or grief following the loss of an attachment figure is considered to be a normal and adaptive response for an attached infant.

Research by developmental psychologist Mary Ainsworth in the 1960s and '70s expanded on Bowlby's work, introducing the concept of the "secure base", impact of maternal responsiveness and sensitivity to infant distress, and identified attachment patterns in infants: secure, avoidant, anxious, and disorganized attachment. In the 1980s, attachment theory was extended to adult relationships and attachment in adults, making it applicable beyond early childhood. Bowlby's theory integrated concepts from evolutionary biology, object relations theory, control systems theory, ethology, and cognitive psychology, and was fully articulated in his trilogy, Attachment and Loss (1969–82).

While long criticized by academic psychologists, anthropologists and psychoanalysts, attachment theory has become a dominant approach to understanding early social development and has generated extensive research. Despite criticisms related to temperament, measurement, neglect of social complexity, and mother-blaming the theory has influenced therapeutic practices and social and childcare policies. Recent critics of attachment theory argue that it overemphasizes maternal influence while overlooking genetic, cultural, and broader familial factors, with studies suggesting that adult attachment is more strongly shaped by genes and individual experiences than by shared upbringing. Attachment theory models are heavily focused on attachment to the mother, not other family members and peers, also noted by Rosjke Hasseldine. A misapprehension of attachment theory has also given rise to multiple pseudoscientific therapeutic practices which resulted in the deaths of multiple children.

== Attachment patterns ==
Attachment theory styles

The strength of a child's attachment behaviour in a given circumstance does not indicate the "strength" of the attachment bond. Some insecure children will routinely display very pronounced attachment behaviours, while many secure children find that there is no great need to engage in either intense or frequent shows of attachment behaviour.

Individuals with different attachment styles have different beliefs about romantic love period, availability, trust capability of love partners, and love readiness.

=== Secure attachment ===
A child who is securely attached to their parent will explore and play freely while the caregiver is present, using them as a "secure base" from which to explore. The child will engage with the stranger when the caregiver is present and may be visibly upset when the caregiver departs, but will be happy to see the caregiver on their return. The child feels confident that the caregiver is available and will be responsive to their attachment needs and communications.

=== Anxious-ambivalent attachment ===
Children classified as having anxious-ambivalent attachment show a form of insecure attachment which is also sometimes called "resistant attachment". Ambivalent/Resistant (C) showed distress even before separation, and were clingy and difficult to comfort on the caregiver's return. They showed either signs of resentment in response to the absence (C1 subtype), or signs of helpless passivity (C2 subtype). Hans et al. have expressed concern that "ambivalent attachment remains the most poorly understood of Ainsworth's attachment types". In particular, the relationship between ambivalent/resistant (C) and disorganisation (D) is still to be clarified. However, researchers agree that the Anxious-Ambivalent/Resistant strategy is a response to unpredictably responsive caregiving, and that the displays of anger or helplessness towards the caregiver on reunion can be regarded as a conditional strategy for maintaining the availability of the caregiver by preemptively taking control of the interaction.

=== Anxious-avoidant attachment ===
A child with the anxious-avoidant insecure attachment pattern will avoid or ignore the caregiver, showing little emotion when the caregiver departs or returns. The child will not explore very much, regardless of who is there. Infants classified as anxious-avoidant (A) represented a puzzle in the early 1980s. They did not exhibit distress upon separation, and either ignored the caregiver upon return (A1 subtype) or showed a tendency to approach, with some tendency to ignore or turn away from the caregiver (A2 subtype). Ainsworth and Bell theorised that the apparently unruffled behaviour of avoidant infants is in fact a mask for distress, a hypothesis later supported by studies of their heart rates.

=== Disorganized-disoriented attachment ===
Beginning in 1983, Crittenden offered A/C and other new organized classifications (see below). Drawing on records of behaviours discrepant with the A, B and C classifications, a fourth classification was added by Ainsworth's colleague Mary Main. In the Strange Situation, the attachment system is expected to be activated by the departure and return of the caregiver. If the infant's behaviour does not appear to the observer to be coordinated smoothly across episodes to achieve either proximity or some relative proximity with the caregiver, then it is considered 'disorganized', as it indicates a disruption or flooding of the attachment system (e.g., by fear). Infant behaviours in the Strange Situation Protocol coded as disorganized/disoriented include overt displays of fear; contradictory behaviours or affects occurring simultaneously or sequentially; stereotypic, asymmetric, misdirected or jerky movements; or freezing and apparent dissociation. Lyons-Ruth has urged, however, that it should be more widely "recognized that 52% of disorganized infants continue to approach the caregiver, seek comfort, and cease their distress without clear ambivalent or avoidant behavior".

=== Reactive attachment disorder and attachment disorder ===
One atypical attachment pattern is considered to be an actual disorder, known as reactive attachment disorder or RAD, which is a recognized psychiatric diagnosis (ICD-10 F94.1/2 and DSM-IV-TR 313.89). Against common misconception, this is not the same as 'disorganized attachment'. The essential feature of reactive attachment disorder is markedly disturbed and developmentally inappropriate social relatedness in most contexts that begins before age five years, associated with gross pathological care.

=== The dynamic-maturational model ===
The dynamic-maturational model of attachment and adaptation is a biopsychosocial model that describes the effects of attachment relationships on human development and functioning. It is especially focused on the effects of relationships between children and parents and between reproductive couples. The DMM was initially created by developmental psychologist Patricia McKinsey Crittenden and her colleagues, including David DiLalla, Angelika Claussen, Andrea Landini, Steve Farnfield, and Susan Spieker.

=== Significance of patterns ===
Research based on data from longitudinal studies, such as the National Institute of Child Health and Human Development Study of Early Child Care and the Minnesota Study of Risk and Adaption from Birth to Adulthood, and from cross-sectional studies, seeking to show associations between early attachment classifications and peer relationships typically fails to control for social background variables when seeking correlations between attachment classifications and other child behaviours, such as competence with peers. This is a general problem. Lyons-Ruth, for example, found that 'for each additional withdrawing behavior displayed by mothers in relation to their infant's attachment cues in the Strange Situation Procedure, the likelihood of clinical referral by service providers was increased by 50%.' But no attempt was made to assess the social background of the children who had better or worse outcomes. Similar problems affect most longitudinal claims about secure children, for example, that they have more positive and fewer negative peer reactions and establish more and better friendships.

The possibility that infants are competent in peer-groups before nine months of age (before caregiver-focused attachments have formed) has never been investigated in attachment research. Such group-interactional competence has now been demonstrated in babies as young as six months old. As a result, we may now ask whether attachment-formation is itself a consequence of how much experience pre-attachment babies have of interacting in groups, in extended families versus nuclear families for example.

Few, if any, rigorous studies that control for children's social background variables show even a weak association between early experience and any comprehensive measure of social functioning in early adulthood. However, in studies which ignore social background, early experience may seem to predict early childhood representations of relationships, which in turn may be held to correlate with later self and relationship representations and social behaviour.

== Changes in attachment during childhood and adolescence ==
Attachment theory holds that childhood and adolescence support the development of an internal working model that helps form attachments. This internal working model is hypothesized to relate to the individual's state of mind, which develops with respect to attachment generally, and explores how attachment functions in relationship dynamics based on childhood and adolescent experience. The organization of an internal working model is generally seen as leading to more stable attachments in those who develop such a model, rather than those who rely more on the individual's state of mind alone in forming new attachments. Age, cognitive growth, and continued social experience advance the development and complexity of the internal working model.

Changes in attachment within childhood and adolescence depict both change and stability overtime. Studies show that children in their developmental periods might increase or decrease in attachment security depending on their ongoing interpersonal experiences rather than just caregiving. There isn’t a fix, but rather a structure is grounded with later experiences from parents, friends, partners, and life events that are able to form a child’s security. Early forms of relational patterns show how it affects certain aspects of emotional regulation and relationship building, but being able to have space for change.

For instance, a child who starts off with a secure attachment begins to change as time goes by if experiencing rejection or inconsistent support and neglect. This can also go the other way, where a child might have an anxious attachment, but soon feels more secure as they have more positive experiences. This form and attachment show that it is not just one event that shapes a child’s overall development, but rather through various changes and experiences that changes it.

An example of this development is excitedly shown through a social media phenomenon, Punch the Monkey, a baby Japanese macaque that experienced rejection since birth from his mother and relied on his stuffed orangutan toy and his zookeeper. This is often shown as a material comfort, or Harry Harlow's "contact comfort," for the monkey as it was his only source of security. It comes to show that it is safety and emotional regulation that stabilizes and strengthens one’s attachment. Attachment should be understood where early stages matter and the experiences that go along with it can reshape security.

== Cultural differences ==
In Western cultures of child-rearing, there is a focus on single attachment to primarily the mother. This dyadic model is not the only strategy of attachment producing a secure and emotionally adept child. Having a single, dependably responsive and sensitive caregiver (namely, the mother) does not guarantee the ultimate success of the child. Results from Israeli, Dutch, and East African studies show children with multiple caregivers grow up not only feeling secure, but also develop "more enhanced capacities to view the world from multiple perspectives." This evidence can be more readily found in hunter-gatherer communities, like those that exist in rural Tanzania.

In hunter-gatherer communities past and present, mothers may be the primary caregivers, but not in the same way as stay-at-home mothers in Western cultures. Some Australian Aboriginal languages do not distinguish mothers, calling them 'aunt.' This reflects that a baby's adult kin share parental responsibilities for ensuring a child's survival with a variety of allomothers. So while a mother is important, she does not offer the only opportunity for care and security. Several group members (with or without blood relations) contribute to raising a child, sharing the parenting role, and therefore can be sources of multiple relationships and attachments. There is evidence of this communal parenting throughout history that "would have significant implications for the evolution of multiple attachment."

In rural India, where a family typically consists of three generations (and sometimes four: great-grandparents, grandparents, parents, and child or children), the child or children would have four to six caregivers from whom to select their favourite "attachment figure". A child's uncles and aunts (parents' siblings and their spouses) contribute significantly to the child's and the mother's psycho-social enrichment.

Even in Western and Westernised cultures, deviations from the behaviour of American mothers and babies in the Strange Situation Protocol have been observed. A study of 60 Japanese mother-infant pairs compared them with Ainsworth's distributional pattern. Although the ranges for securely attached and insecurely attached had no significant differences in proportions, the Japanese insecure group consisted of only resistant children, with no children categorized as avoidant. This may be because the Japanese child rearing philosophy stressed close mother infant bonds more so than in Western cultures. A Northern German study replicated the Ainsworth Strange Situation with 46 mother-infant pairs and found a distribution of attachment classifications different from North America, with a high number of avoidant infants: 52% avoidant, 34% secure, and 13% resistant.

While all children require a secure social environment and strong relationships for healthy development, the kinds of social milieux and close relationships available vary widely around the world. They may sometimes involve just one parent, but will far more often involve aunts and uncles, grandparents, cousins, siblings, and peer groups. Viewed through the lens of attachment theory, children born into Western societies may seem to require only one kind of relationship for healthy development. But cross-cultural research suggests that multiple lenses are needed to appreciate the varied routes to a flourishing adulthood available around the world.

== Attachment styles in adults ==
Attachment theory was extended to adult romantic relationships in the late 1980s by Cindy Hazan and Phillip Shaver. Four styles of attachment have been identified in adults: secure, anxious-preoccupied, dismissive-avoidant, and fearful-avoidant. These roughly correspond to infant classifications: secure, insecure-ambivalent, insecure-avoidant, and disorganized/disoriented. Adult attachment styles are related to individual differences in the ways in which adults experience and manage their emotions. Recent meta-analyses link insecure attachment styles to lower emotional intelligence and lower trait mindfulness. Additionally, subsequent research extended attachment theory to adult relationships, suggesting that consistent experiences with supportive and responsive partners can enhance attachment security and contribute to greater psychological resilience over time. However, childhood attachment does not reliably persist into adulthood. A meta-analysis found no significant stability when attachment was measured more than 15 years apart.

== History ==
Attachment theory rode a post-World War 2 wave in Westernized countries toward child-centred parenting. The child-centred message of Benjamin Spock's post-war manual The Common Sense Book of Baby and Child Care, first published in 1946, made it one of the best-selling books of the twentieth century. Previous experts had warned parents not to spoil babies through rewarding them for crying by picking them up and comforting them, or by feeding them on demand. Babies should be fed once every four hours and otherwise left to cry it out. Spock saw such parenting as cruel. His manual promoted flexibility in child-rearing, advising parents to treat each child as an individual and emphasizing that, ultimately, their common sense and "natural loving care" were the keys to successful parenting. A similar structure of feeling emerged in post-war Britain.

=== Formulation of the theory ===
Following the publication of Maternal Care and Mental Health, Bowlby sought new understanding from the fields of evolutionary biology, ethology, developmental psychology, cognitive science and the theory of control systems. He formulated the innovative proposition that mechanisms underlying an infant's emotional tie to the caregiver(s) were not learnt, but emerged as a result of evolutionary pressure. He set out to develop a theory of motivation and behaviour-control built on observational science rather than Freudian interpretation. Bowlby argued that with attachment theory, he had made good the "deficiencies of the data and the lack of theory to link alleged cause and effect" of Maternal Care and Mental Health.

=== Psychoanalysis ===
Bowlby was trained as a psychoanalyst under the supervision of Melanie Klein in the school of object relations theory. Unlike Freudian theory, which holds that infants are born into a state of primary narcissism that makes social relations with other people impossible, object relations theory proposes that babies have emotional relations with their mother from the start of life, albeit dominated by phantasy. Thus, Bowlby was educated to believe that the infant-mother relationship is of supreme importance to human beings from the dawn of life, a belief that attachment theory celebrates.

=== Ethology ===
One of the main lessons Bowlby drew from ethology was the importance of the direct observation of animals in their 'home' environments to scientific theory-building. Thus, he constantly stressed the advantages of basing his theory of infancy on verifiable observations of babies' action patterns, rather than psychoanalytic reconstruction of their fantasy lives. After Bowlby's attention was drawn to ethology in the early 1950s by reading Konrad Lorenz's work, he imported several ethological concepts into attachment theory including fixed action patterns, instincts and later, behavioural systems. He also drew on ethology to emphasize the importance of recognizing the evolutionary origins of human social behaviour, particularly in infants.

Initially, Bowlby imported the ethological concepts of imprinting and critical periods into his theory. He was particularly impressed by Konrad Lorenz's findings about imprinting in ducklings and goslings. So he hypothesised that there was a sensitivity period during which this attachment system best operated, lasting from six weeks to twelve months of age. However, over time, research proved there were more differences than similarities between attachment behaviours in human babies and imprinting in waterbirds, so the analogy was dropped.

=== Cybernetics ===
The theory of control systems (cybernetics), developing during the 1930s and 1940s, influenced Bowlby's thinking. The young child's need for proximity to the attachment figure was seen as balancing homeostatically with the need for exploration. (Bowlby compared this process to physiological homeostasis, whereby, for example, blood pressure is kept within limits). The actual distance maintained by the child would vary as the balance of needs changed. For example, the approach of a stranger or an injury would cause the child exploring at a distance to seek proximity. The child's goal is not an object (the caregiver) but a state; maintenance of the desired distance from the caregiver, depending on circumstances.

=== Cognitive development ===
Bowlby's reliance on Piaget's theory of cognitive development raised questions about object permanence (the ability to remember an object that is temporarily absent) in early attachment behaviours. An infant's ability to discriminate between strangers and to react to the mother's absence seemed to occur months earlier than Piaget suggested was cognitively possible. More recently, it has been noted that the understanding of mental representation has advanced so much since Bowlby's day that present views can be more specific than those of Bowlby's time.

=== Internal working model ===
Bowlby discovered the internal working model construct in the writings of an eminent scientist interested in the neural basis of animal memory, John Zachary Young, while rethinking what he considered to be scientifically outdated explanations of the psychoanalytic "internal world." Young himself was influenced by the work of the philosopher Kenneth Craik.

== Neurobiology of attachment ==
In addition to longitudinal studies, there has been psychophysiological research on the neurobiology of attachment. Research has begun to include neural development, behaviour genetics and temperament concepts. Generally, temperament and attachment constitute separate developmental domains, but aspects of both contribute to a range of interpersonal and intrapersonal developmental outcomes. Some types of temperament may make some individuals susceptible to the stress of unpredictable or hostile relationships with caregivers in the early years. In the absence of available and responsive caregivers it appears that some children are particularly vulnerable to developing attachment disorders.

Social background factors affect the quality of caregiving received in infancy and childhood and can thus correlate with variations in an individual's neurological systems that regulate stress. In psychophysiological research on attachment, the two main areas studied have been autonomic responses, such as heart rate or respiration, and the activity of the hypothalamic–pituitary–adrenal axis, a system that is responsible for the body's reaction to stress. Infants' physiological responses have been measured during the Strange Situation procedure, looking at individual differences in five simple social behaviours. Some recent studies suggest that early attachment relationships are encoded at the molecular level in a child's cells, thereby affecting later immune system functioning. Some studies suggest that early negative experiences (not necessarily attachment-relevant) affect the immune system in ways which may raise the chances of suffering from cardiovascular disease, autoimmune diseases, and certain types of cancer.

Advances in identifying key brain structures, neural circuits, neurotransmitter systems, and neuropeptides, open up the possibility of discovering how neurology might be involved in attachment system functioning (internal working models), if this could be operationally defined, and can indicate more about a certain individual. There is initial evidence that caregiving and attachment involve both unique and overlapping brain regions. Another issue is the role of inherited genetic factors in shaping attachments: for example one type of polymorphism of the gene coding for the D_{2} dopamine receptor has been linked to anxious attachment and another in the gene for the 5-HT_{2A} serotonin receptor with avoidant attachment.

Studies show that attachment in adulthood is simultaneously associated with biomarkers of immunity. For example, individuals with an avoidance attachment style produce higher levels of the pro inflammatory cytokine interleukin-6 (IL-6) when reacting to an interpersonal stressor, while individuals representing an anxious attachment style tend to have elevated cortisol production and lower numbers of T cells. Although children vary genetically and each individual requires different attachment relationships, there is consistent evidence that maternal warmth during infancy and childhood creates a safe haven for individuals resulting in superior immune system functioning. One theoretical basis for this is that it makes biological sense for children to vary in their susceptibility to rearing influence.

The most recent and comprehensive neurobiological framework is the functional neuro-anatomical model of human attachment (NAMA) developed by Pascal Vrticka and colleagues, which has been further extended to also include considerations of disorganised / disrupted attachment (NAMDA). A narrative on the neurobiological roots of attachment-system functioning delineating the involved neurobiological circuits in more detail is also available. The latest considerations of human attachment from a social neuroscience perspective furthermore emphasise the importance of bio-behavioural and interpersonal neural synchrony, which are summarised under the umbrella of relational neuroscience.

== Crime ==
Attachment theory has often been applied in the discipline of criminology. It has been used in an attempt to identify causal mechanisms in criminal behaviour – with uses ranging from offender profiling, better understanding types of offence and the pursuit of preventative policy. It has been found that disturbances early on in child-caregiver relationships are a risk factor in criminality. Attachment theory in this context has been described as "perhaps the most influential of contemporary psychoanalytically oriented theories of crime".

=== Age distribution of crime ===
Two theories about why crime peaks in the late teenage years and early twenties are called the developmental theory and the life-course theory, and both involve attachment theory. Developmental perspectives argue that individuals with disrupted childhood attachments will have criminal careers that persist well into adulthood. Life course perspectives argue that relationships at every stage of the life course can influence an individual's likelihood of committing crimes.

=== Types of offences ===
Disrupted attachment patterns from childhood have been identified as a risk factor for domestic violence. These disruptions in childhood can prevent the formation of a secure attachment relationship, and in turn adversely affecting a healthy way to deal with stress. In adulthood, lack of coping mechanisms can result in violent behaviour. Bowlby's theory of functional anger states that children signal to their caregiver that their attachment needs are not being met by use of angry behaviour. This perception of low support from partner has been identified as a strong predictor of male violence. Other predictors have been named as perceived deficiency in maternal love in childhood, low self-esteem. It has also been found that individuals with a dismissive attachment style, often seen in an antisocial/narcissistic-narcissistic subtype of offender, tend to be emotionally abusive as well as violent. Individuals in the borderline/emotionally dependent subtype have traits which originate from insecure attachment in childhood, and tend to have high levels of anger.

It has been found that sexual offenders have significantly less secure maternal and paternal attachments compared with non-offenders which suggests that insecure attachments in infancy persist into adulthood. In a recent study, 57% of sexual offenders were found to be of a preoccupied attachment style. There is also evidence that suggests subtypes of sexual crime can have different attachment styles. Dismissive individuals tend to be hostile towards others, and are more likely to offend violently against adult women. By contrast, child abusers are more likely to have preoccupied attachment styles as the tendency to seek approval from others becomes distorted and attachment relationships become sexualized.

=== Attachment styles and personality disorders ===
Recent studies across general, prison and forensic inpatient populations have also sought to examine the relationship between specific clusters of personality disorders and attachment styles.

Among prison and forensic inpatient populations, secure attachment was observed less often than in the general population control group. Further, fearful avoidant attachment styles were observed far more frequently in these same populations than in the control groups.

The analysis for specific clusters, however, was far more nuanced.

Cluster A and cluster C pathology showed clearer associations with attachment styles than cluster B did.

Among cluster B personality disorders – specifically antisocial personality disorder (ASPD) – was most often observed alongside a dismissive avoidant attachment style. On the other hand, borderline personality disorder (BPD) was most frequently linked to an anxious preoccupied attachment style when measured categorically.

Histrionic personality disorder (HPD) was negatively associated with the dismissive avoidant attachment style, and no cluster B disorder was associated with fearful avoidant attachment.

=== Uses within probation practice ===
Attachment theory has been of special interest within probation settings. When put into practice, probation officers aim to learn their probationer's attachment history because it can give them insight into how the probationer will respond to different scenarios and when they are the most vulnerable to reoffend. One of the primary strategies of implementation is to set up the probation officer as a secure base. This secure base relationship is formed by the probation officer being reliable, safe, and in tune with the probationer, and is intended to help give them a partly representational secure relationship that they have not been able to form.

== Practical applications ==
As a theory of socioemotional development, attachment theory has proved to have practical applications in social policy, in decisions about the care and welfare of children and about mental health. Attachment theory research also highlights that insecure attachment styles are linked to difficulties in emotional regulation and the development of maladaptive coping strategies, which can have long-term implications for mental health treatment planning.

=== Child care policies ===
Social policies concerning the care of children were the driving force in Bowlby's development of attachment theory. The difficulty lies in applying attachment concepts to policy and practice. In 2008 C.H. Zeanah and colleagues stated, "Supporting early child-parent relationships is an increasingly prominent goal of mental health practitioners, community-based service providers and policy makers ... Attachment theory and research have generated important findings concerning early child development and spurred the creation of programs to support early child-parent relationships." Thus the NICHD has in the past held that the mark of top notch day care is that it contributes to secure attachment relationships in children.

However, child care policy is highly contested, and it has recently been shown that making the maintenance of infant-caregiver bonds the primary index of good-quality child care does not gel well with the group-based environment of most Western forms of early childhood education and care. The difficulties of one key-worker maintaining availability, sensitivity and appropriate one-to-one responsiveness to several children at the same time, the frequency of part-time work in child care facilities and high staff-turnover means the imperative to build secure one-to-one infant-caregiver attachments is well-nigh impossible to achieve, putting undue stress on both infants and educators. Hence, recently, group-based care, as occurs in Japan, has been argued to be more in keeping with high quality child care than NICHD-like imperatives to maintain one-to-one care encouraged by attachment advocates. All the same, and despite the many empirical, cross-cultural and methodological critiques of attachment theory, some policy-makers continue energetically to advocate the view that "legislative initiatives reflecting higher standards for credentialing and licensing childcare workers" require "education in child development and attachment theory, and at least a two-year associate degree course as well as salary increases and increased stature for childcare positions".

Arguments for more flexible work arrangements that recognize child care as essential for all its employees also sometimes reference attachment theory. This includes re-examining parental leave policies, the main idea being that a lack of parental leave inhibits early parent-child bonding.

In the past, attachment theory has often been held to have had significant policy implications for hospitalized or institutionalized children, and those in poor-quality daycare. Nowadays, historians challenge this belief: attachment theory being just part of a far wider movement towards child-centredness.

Ideological investment in the belief that babies are best raised by home-alone mothers leads some attachment advocates to maintain that non-maternal care, particularly in group settings, has deleterious effects on social development. This view is not supported by rigorous research, though it is plain that poor quality care carries risks, while young children who experience good quality out-of-home care typically flourish when a group-based approach is taken to care in group settings.

Attachment theory has mixed implications in residence and contact disputes, and applications by foster parents to adopt foster children. In the past, particularly in North America, the main theoretical framework was psychoanalysis. Increasingly, attachment theory has replaced it, thus focusing on the quality and continuity of caregiver relationships rather than economic well-being or automatic precedence of any one party, such as the biological mother. Rutter noted that in the UK, since 1980, family courts have shifted considerably to recognize the complications of attachment relationships. Children tend to have attachment relationships with both parents and often grandparents or other relatives. While, through an attachment prism, judgements have been deemed to need to take this into account along with the impact of step-families, new evidence refutes this. In consequence, Britain's Ministry of Justice has ruled that family law judgements will not longer assume that being in contact with both parents is in the best interests of the child.

Attachment theory can also inform decisions made in social work, especially in humanistic social work (Petru Stefaroi), and court processes about foster care or other placements. The Westernised assumptions built into attachment theory about family-structure and the gendered division of labour sometimes make these decisions profoundly unethical. Nevertheless, considering the child's attachment needs often determines the supposed level of risk posed by placement options.

=== Clinical practice with children ===
Despite criticism, attachment theory remains a high-profile theory of socioemotional development with a scientific reputation and continues to generate substantial research. Yet it has, until recently, been less used in clinical practice. This may be partly due to lack of attention paid to clinical application by Bowlby himself and partly due to broader meanings of the word 'attachment' used among practitioners. It may also be partly due to the mistaken association of attachment theory with the pseudoscientific interventions misleadingly known as attachment therapy or holding therapy. But it is most likely the result of the narrowness of the assumptions about family-life built into attachment theory.

=== Attachment-based therapy ===
In 1988, Bowlby published a series of lectures that outlined how attachment theory and research could be used to understand and treat child and family disorders. His focus in bringing about change was the parents' internal working models, parenting behaviours, and the parents' relationship with the therapeutic intervenor. Ongoing research has led to a number of individual treatments and prevention and intervention programs. In regard to personal development, children from all age groups were tested to show the effectiveness of the theory that is being theorized by Bowlby. They range from individual therapy to public health programs to interventions designed for foster caregivers. For infants and younger children, the focus is on increasing the responsiveness and sensitivity of the caregiver, or if that is not possible, placing the child with a different caregiver. An assessment of the attachment status or caregiving responses of the caregiver is invariably included, as attachment is a two-way process involving attachment behaviour and caregiver response. Some programs are aimed at foster care because the attachment behaviours of infants or children with attachment difficulties often do not elicit appropriate caregiver responses. Modern prevention and intervention programs have proven successful.

In the view of attachment-based therapists, attachment theory offers a broad, far-reaching view of human functioning and can enrich a therapist's understanding of patients and the therapeutic relationship rather than dictate a particular form of treatment. Some forms of psychoanalysis-based therapy for adults—within relational psychoanalysis and other approaches—also incorporate attachment theory and patterns.

== Criticism ==
John Bowlby staunchly defended attachment theory as being a theory of the kind Karl Popper called scientific. This meant it would be refuted if any of its empirical predictions were found to be false. Mary Ainsworth and her colleagues disagreed:

Attachment theory might be described as "programmatic" and open-ended. It does not purport to be a tight network of propositions on the basis of which hypotheses may be formulated, any one of which, in the event of an adequate but unsuccessful test, could invalidate the theory as a whole ... Despite its lack of resemblance to a mathematico-physical theory, both the general theory of behaviour and attachment theory amount to what Kuhn (1962) termed a paradigm change for developmental psychology—a complete shift of perspective.

Many of Bowlby's empirical claims and predictions have been refuted by subsequent research, yet the latest edition of The Handbook of Attachment asserts that "nothing that has emerged from the thousands of studies produced over the past 40 years has led to a serious challenge to the core theory ... since the time of Bowlby's writings." This supports Ainsworth's contention that attachment theory is not a scientific theory but a psycho-social movement of the kind identified by Thomas Kuhn as lying behind changes of epistemic perspective. This does not stop many people, including attachment advocates, developmental psychologists, and policy-makers, from continuing to claim that attachment theory is scientific. As developmental psychologist Suzanne Zeedyk puts it, when attachment theory is referred to nowadays, "that statement is no longer regarded as 'theory'. The operation of the attachment system is now regarded as 'fact.'"

=== The attachment theory bubble ===
The attachment perspective has drawn scientific and general audience attention alike because it is seen as putting children and their needs at centre stage of developmental discussions. Attachment advocates sometimes go further than this, writing as if child-centered parenting styles are a direct consequence of Bowlby's theory (though, in fact, child-centeredness was being popularized a decade or more before he devised his theory). The over-estimation of the importance of Bowlby's influence has become a staple of the attachment movement, which often pays tribute to him. The prominent British psychoanalyst Professor Brett Kahr states that Bowlby's findings are now "beyond all doubt", and as a consequence:

Bowlby's paradigm, now known as attachment theory, deserves a place in the history of medicine, in the history of psychology, in the history of science, and in the history of humanity, as one of the greatest achievements, on a par, I wish to suggest, with the art of Leonardo da Vinci, the music of Wolfgang Amadeus Mozart, and the nonviolent militarism of Mohandas Gandhi.

Praise for high-profile attachment theorists is commonplace within circles that promote attachment theory. Peter Fonagy and his colleagues state that attachment theory is securely based on "the complex and meticulous observational work of Mary Ainsworth", and that the concept of internal working models has been sanctioned by some of the "greatest minds in the attachment field".

The presence of a strong in-group and out-group dynamic within attachment advocacy is confirmed by the way that those 'inside the bubble' fail to see the theory's scientific shortcomings until they remove themselves. As Judi Mesman observed:

Having been academically 'raised' in one of the world's strongholds of attachment research, I was a firm believer of the universality assumptions of attachment theory and its methods. It wasn't until I started working with young scholars from the Global South, collecting video data of family life in over 20 countries, that I could not escape questioning the basis for some of these universality claims.

Conversely, if scientists who work inside the attachment theory bubble publish results which do seriously challenge the claims of attachment theory, those results are typically ignored, and the scientists themselves ostracised. For example, the findings and arguments that Michael Lamb and colleagues published in the 1980s to challenge the attachment perspective are neither referenced nor discussed in the latest edition of The Handbook of Attachment (a book of 43 chapters), Lamb's attachment-advocating colleagues having "effectively ostracized" him.

=== Faulty descriptive base ===
Bowlby's aim to replace psychoanalysts' phantasy-focused interpretive accounts of young children's hidden mental lives with the findings of direct observation as a grounding for his theory has had to be forsaken. Attachment theory has retreated from any serious grounding in a natural history of very young children and now champions the expert interpretation of a limited number of pre-defined behaviours in the Strange Situation Procedure (SSP) as shedding light on invisible internal working models which have no generally-agreed definition.

Particular observational claims made by Bowlby which are now refuted include studies showing that the attachment behaviours which he attributed to young infants are neither fixed in form nor insensitive to their context-of-use (as he claimed); nor do these behaviours exhaust babies' relationship-relevant social repertoire. Contrary to Bowlby's empirical claims, fear of strangers and separation anxiety are not normally observed when 'securely attached' infants or toddlers are left by their mothers with strangers. Attachment behaviours are not integrated over the first years of life into what ethologists call behavioural systems of which all the components should regularly appear in the same intercorrelated order.

Likewise, the observational research by Mary Ainsworth and her colleagues upon which the SSP was first based proves to have been far from "meticulous", contrary to the beliefs of attachment theorists. Marga Vicedo, one of the few scholars to have inspected at first hand Ainsworth and her team's original observational records in the definitive study grounding the SSP, reports as follows:

Although confidentiality prevents quoting directly from these data, the narrative reports from these observations that I have seen cannot be considered trustworthy scientific reports. Several of them are permeated with subjective evaluations of the mothers' personalities from day one, including moral judgements. Other reports reveal tensions between the observer and the observed mothers. In addition, the reports from the different observers vary substantially in nature and quality, and most do not include notes taken every five minutes. In fact, one observer did not write up the observations until months later.

=== The Strange Situation is not a reliable procedure ===
When the reliability of the SSP is tested, results do not remain stable, especially when the backcloth of social circumstances of infant-adult couples change between tests. Studies show that the greatest reliability is found in attachment ratings from the SSP when the social background of the infant's family remains stable between two assessments: socio-economically, maritally, in terms of social support, housing, and childcare provision. But the crucial test is when background variables change between tests. Then it is found that, as a baby's social background changes between two SSP ratings, the ratings are likely to change as well. SSP classifications are especially volatile when researchers make the effort to recruit infants who do not come from intact middle-class families and whose parents have not volunteered to participate.

An important corollary of this finding is that attachment studies which do not control for a family's social background—and many do not—may produce results which, for example, seem to prove levels of security in attachment classification that have a strong positive correlation with a factor like maternal sensitivity, when, in fact, levels of security and sensitivity are both caused by other unstudied factors from their social background. This means that the results of correlational studies which seem to prove the long-term effects of an infant's attachment classification cannot be taken at face value if those studies were uncontrolled: the strength of correlations is likely to have been inflated by one or more of the unstudied background variables.

In short, classifications of attachment in/security derived from the SSP cannot be taken as primarily reflecting the existence of an internal system or working model in the young child. They are far more likely to be reflecting what has recently been happening in the social world external to the infant and her or his mother-figure(s) at the time of their assessment.

=== Attachment classifications of children seldom predict adult functioning ===
The best-known longitudinal studies to have researched the long-term effects/correlates of infant-caregiver bonds on grown-up functions have all failed to produce the kinds of results attachment theory predicts. This is especially true in studies that have controlled for the continuity and discontinuity of background variables experienced by the child while she or he was developing. One longitudinal study in Minnesota showed that, if background variables were properly taken into account, attachment security in infancy only accounted for 5% of the variability in social competence when the study-children had reached the age of nineteen. Two well-known German studies also failed to find any significant correlation between security of attachment (as measured in the SSP) in toddlers and a variety of measures of social relating after age ten. Long-term Israeli research also found that continuity in attachment representation correlated strongly with the stability of the caregiver's environment, and discontinuity with instability.

Taken altogether, such findings demonstrate that, when studies using SSP measures include measures of an infant's social circumstances, there can be a strong link to grown-up outcomes—accounting for half the variance in the 'Minnesota' longitudinal study when, by themselves, attachment measures account for as little as one twentieth of the variance .

=== A flawed evolutionary rationale ===
From the beginning, attachment theory sidelined the essential role of caregivers' behaviours in promoting child well-being, both in our Stone Age ancestors and in families today. It took the primary factor in promoting an infant's survival to be a biological provision in babies themselves. This provision has been variously called an instinct, an attachment behavioural system and an internal working model. Yet the theory also acknowledges that the baby's biological provision does not become operational until the baby is mobile, not being fully formed until after a child has reached its third birthday, according to Bowlby. Which, if the theory were true, would make babies vulnerable to all sorts of peril for up to three years after birth. Tacitly, Bowlby and Ainsworth's strictures on maternal care make it plain that it is caregivers who guarantee very young children's safety and security, not a hypothesized attachment behavioural system or working model.

Furthermore, the evidential claims made by Bowlby to support his attribution of attachment behaviour to primates and to hunter-gatherers are not supported by empirical studies.

== See also ==
- Alarm Distress Baby Scale – Screening tool for healthcare practitioners
- Atlas personality – Personality trait found in those who took on adult responsibilities early
- Attachment parenting – Parenting philosophy
- Attachment theory and psychology of religion – Research area
- Dynamic-maturational model of attachment and adaptation – Biopsychosocial model developed from attachment theory
- Fathers as attachment figures
- Human bonding – Process of development of a close, interpersonal relationship
- Nurture kinship – Acts of nurture between individuals
- Parental love – Feeling of attachment towards progeny
- Passionate and companionate love – Two basic love feelings
- Relationship science – Field dedicated to the scientific study of interpersonal relationship processes

== General and cited references ==
- Bowlby J (1987) [1st Pub. 1953]. Child Care and the Growth of Love. London: Penguin Books. ISBN 978-0-14-020271-7. Version of WHO publication Maternal Care and Mental Health published for sale to the general public.
- Bowlby J (1971) [1969]. Attachment and Loss (Vol. 1: Attachment) (1st ed.). London: Penguin Books. ISBN 978-0-14-021276-1.
- Bowlby J (1979). The Making and Breaking of Affectional Bonds. London: Tavistock Publications. ISBN 978-0-422-76860-3.
- Bowlby J (1982). Attachment and Loss (Vol. 1: Attachment) (2nd ed.). New York: Basic Books. ISBN 978-0-465-00543-7. LCCN 00266879. OCLC 11442968. NLM 8412414.
- Bowlby J (1999) [1982]. Attachment. Attachment and Loss Vol. I (2nd ed.). New York: Basic Books. ISBN 0-465-00543-8. LCCN 00266879. OCLC 11442968. NLM 8412414.
- Craik K (1967) [1943]. The Nature of Explanation. Cambridge: Cambridge University Press. ISBN 978-0-521-09445-0.
- Elliot AJ, Reis HT (August 2003). "Attachment and exploration in adulthood". Journal of Personality and Social Psychology. 85 (2): 317–31. doi:10.1037/0022-3514.85.2.317. PMID 12916573.
- Holmes J (1993). John Bowlby & Attachment Theory. Makers of modern psychotherapy. London: Routledge. ISBN 0-415-07729-X.
- Karen R (1998). Becoming Attached: First Relationships and How They Shape Our Capacity to Love. Oxford and New York: Oxford University Press. ISBN 0-19-511501-5.
- Mercer J (2006). Understanding Attachment: Parenting, child care, and emotional development. Westport, CT: Praeger Publishers. ISBN 978-0-275-98217-1. LCCN 2005019272. OCLC 61115448.
- Prior V, Glaser D (2006). Understanding Attachment and Attachment Disorders: Theory, Evidence and Practice. Child and Adolescent Mental Health, RCPRTU. London and Philadelphia: Jessica Kingsley Publishers. ISBN 978-1-84310-245-8.
- Tinbergen N (1989) [1st Pub.=1951]. The Study of Instinct. Oxford: Oxford University Press. ISBN 978-0-19-857722-5.
