= Relational-cultural therapy =

Psychological theory and therapy

Relational-cultural theory, and by extension, relational-cultural therapy (RCT) stems from the work of Jean Baker Miller, M.D. Often, relational-cultural theory is aligned with the feminist and or multicultural movements in psychology. In fact, RCT embraces many social justice aspects from these movements.

RCT was developed in Wellesley, Massachusetts in the 1970s through the work of psychiatrist, Jean Baker Miller (Toward a New Psychology of Women), psychologists, Judith V. Jordan, Janet Surrey, and Irene Stiver at the Stone Center at Wellesley College in reaction to psychodynamic theory. The Stone Center at Wellesley College and the Jean Baker Miller Training Institute are the hubs of RCT research and training and are perhaps best known for their Working Papers series, collective works that are continuously considered for review and reconsideration. RCT depicts culture as an active agent in relational processes that share human possibility. Some have noted that RCT's traditional focus was on women and their relational experiences.

Many mental health professionals employ RCT in their practice. A nonexhaustive list of these include: counselors, social workers, psychologists, and psychiatrists. Some current major relational-cultural theorists, writers, and practitioners include: Judith V. Jordan, Ph D, Amy Banks, MD, Maureen Walker, Ph D, Linda Hartling, Ph D, Sarah Sydelle Price, PCC, Rosjke Hasseldine and Thelma Duffey, Ph D The consistent, primary focus of RCT is the primacy of relationships. That is, relationships are both the indicators for, and the healing mechanism in psychotherapy toward, mental health and wellness.

One of the core tenets of RCT is the Central Relational Paradox (CRP). The CRP assumes that we all have a natural drive toward relationships, and in these relationships we long for acceptance. However, we come to believe that there are things about us that are unacceptable or unlovable. Thus, we choose to hide these things; we keep them out of our relationships. In the end, the connections we make with others are not as fulfilling and validating as they otherwise might have been.

A primary goal of RCT is to create and maintain Mutually-Growth-Fostering Relationships, relationships in which both parties feel that they matter. In these healthy relationships, all of the involved parties experience what is known as the Five Good Things. These include: 1) a desire to move into more relationships, because of how a good relational experience feels; 2) a sense of zest, or energy; 3) increased knowledge of oneself and the other person in the relationship; 4) a desire to take action both in the growth-fostering relationship and outside of it; 5) an overall increased sense of worth.

RCT involves working with clients to identify, and strive in, relationships that present opportunities for them to experience Mutually-Growth-Fostering Relationships. In fact, a strong, connected therapeutic relationship should be a model for these kinds of relationships. While there a number of specific challenges presented in the therapeutic relationship, RCT practitioners believe that their relationships with their clients can have a reasonably high degree of mutuality. Clinical experiences of mutuality include: the client's movement toward the awareness that they matter to the therapist, the therapist that they, too, matter to the client, an integrative awareness both have of what it means to feel like one matters, and the worth involved in offering this to another person through the process of connection.
