= Jean Baker Miller =

American psychiatrist, psychoanalyst, activist, and author (1927–2006)

- Born: September 29, 1927; Bronx, New York City
- Died: July 29, 2006 (aged 78)
- Education: B.S. Sarah Lawrence College; M.D. Columbia University College of Physicians and Surgeons
- Occupation(s): Psychiatrist; Psychoanalyst; Social activist Feminist; Author
- Spouse: S. M. Miller
- Children: Jonathan F. Miller; Edward D. Miller

Jean Baker Miller (1927–2006) was a psychiatrist, psychoanalyst, social activist, feminist, and author. She wrote Toward a New Psychology of Women, which brings psychological thought together with relational-cultural theory.

== Early life and education ==
Jean Baker Miller was born on September 29, 1927, in the Bronx in New York City to a Jewish family. She was diagnosed with polio at an early age, and was inspired to pursue a career in medicine while in the care of nurses. She attended Hunter College High School in New York City and in '48 graduated from Sarah Lawrence College. She received her M.D. from Columbia University College of Physicians and Surgeons in 1952, and was in New York for psychiatric residency programs at Montefiore Medical Center, Bellevue Hospital Center, the Albert Einstein College of Medicine, Upstate Medical Center, New York Medical College, where she completed her psychoanalytic training.

== Work and publications ==
Miller opened a private practice in New York, and then moved to Boston in 1973. She edited Psychoanalysis and Women: Contributions to New Theory and Therapy (1973), and then wrote Toward a New Psychology of Women (1976), which has become a classic in its field and has been translated into twenty languages. Miller describes the "relational model" of human development ("Relational-Cultural Theory"), proposing that "growth-fostering relationships are a central human necessity and that disconnections are the source of psychological problems." Inspired by Betty Friedan's The Feminine Mystique, and other feminist classics from the 1960s, Relational-Cultural Theory proposes that "isolation is one of the most damaging human experiences and is best treated by reconnecting with other people," and that therapists should "foster an atmosphere of empathy and acceptance for the patient, even at the cost of the therapist’s neutrality." The theory is based on clinical observations and sought to prove that "there was nothing wrong with women, but rather with the way modern culture viewed them."

Following the publication of Toward a New Psychology of Women, Miller became the first director of the Stone Center for Developmental Services and Studies at Wellesley College, which incorporated the relational model into all aspects of the Stone Center's treatment. In 1986, she became the Director of Education for the Stone Center, where she established a group discussion program to share ideas about the relational model and published these ideas as "Working Papers" through the center. In 1991, she published her second book, Women's Growth in Connection: Writings from the Stone Center, co-authored with Judith V. Jordan, Alexandra G. Kaplan, Irene P. Stiver, and Janet L. Surrey. Her third book, The Healing Connection: How Women Form Relationships in Therapy and in Life, co-authored with Irene Pierce Stiver, Ph.D. was published in 1997.

Miller also served as a clinical professor of psychiatry at Boston University School of Medicine and was a faculty member at Harvard Medical School, and practiced psychiatry at Beth Israel Deaconess Medical Center. She was a member of the American College of Psychiatrists, the American Psychiatric Association, the American Orthopsychiatric Association and the American Academy of Psychoanalysis.

== Jean Baker Miller Training Institute ==
In 1995, Jean Baker Miller established the Jean Baker Miller Training Institute (JBMTI) at the Wellesley Centers for Women at Wellesley College, an organization that seeks to "promote social change by expanding definitions and societal norms of personal strength, human health, and cultural wellbeing. She served as its Founding Director and used the institute to teach the theory of Relational-Cultural Theory to mental health professionals and nonprofit organizations.

== Personal life and death ==
She was married to S. M. Miller, an emeritus professor of sociology at Boston University; they had two sons, Dr. Edward D. Miller and Jonathan F. Miller, Chairman and CEO of America Online. Jean Baker Miller died on July 29, 2006, at the age of 78 due to respiratory failure caused by emphysema and post-polio complications.
