= Charles A. Nelson III =

American neuroscientist and psychologist

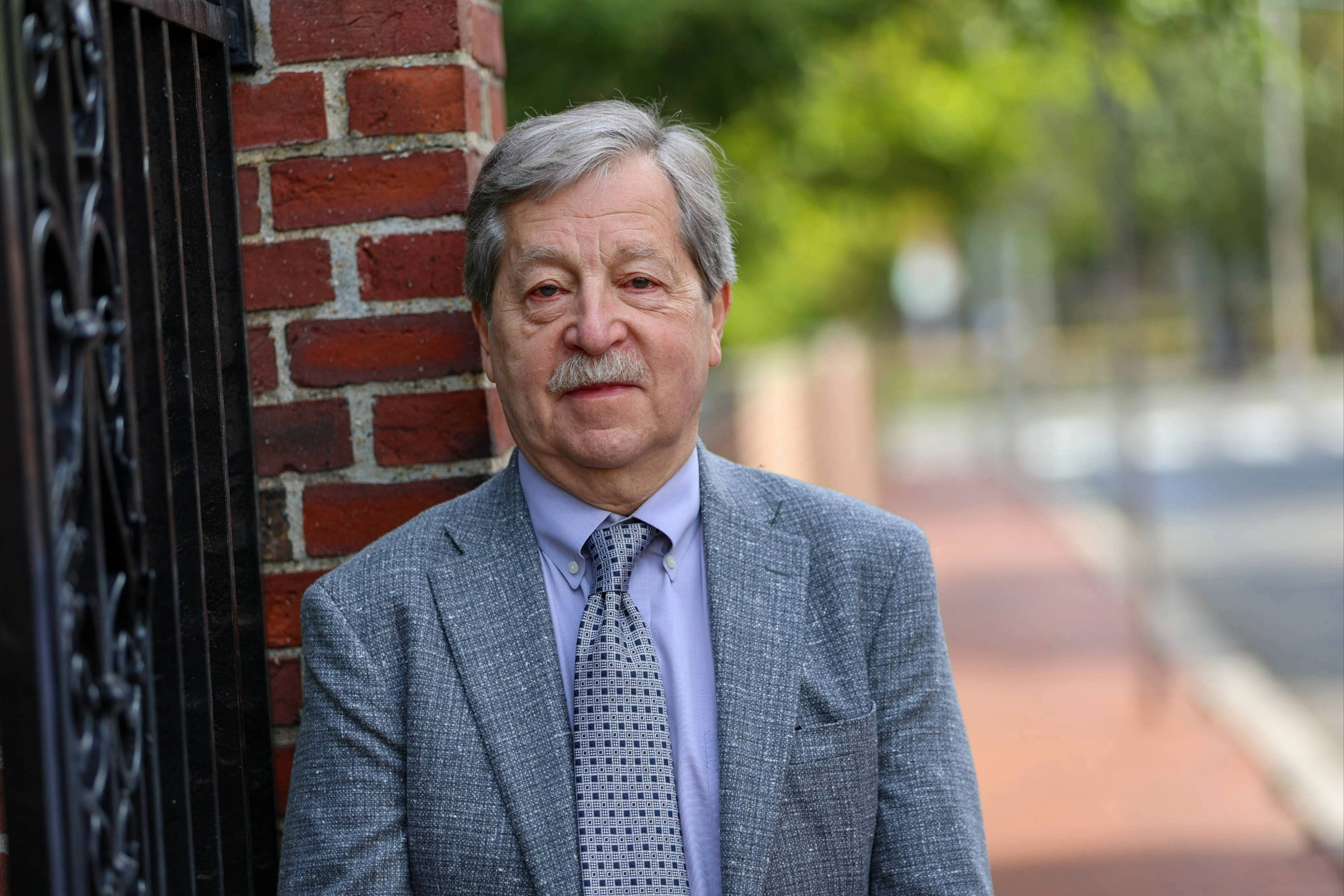
Dr. Charles A Nelson

Charles A. Nelson III is an American neuroscientist and psychologist. Dr. Nelson is particularly interested in both genetic and environmental factors that can alter the course of brain development. Here he has paid particular attention to the role of experience in influencing the course of early brain development. In the first half of his career, he studied the neural correlates and developmental course of face and facial emotion processing. Later in his career, he turned his attention to studies of children growing up exposed to high levels of stress and adversity. Examples include his collaborative work (with Drs. Nathan A. Fox, PhD, University of Maryland, and Charles H. Zeanah, MD, Tulane University) in Romania (Bucharest Early Intervention Project - BEIP), and work in Dhaka, Bangladesh (Bangladesh Early Adversity Neuroimaging – BEAN – project). In this work, he has identified critical periods that have a profound effect on whether early experience has a positive or negative impact on the course of development.

A second manifestation of his interest in factors that can undermine healthy brain development is his work on trajectories to autism. Here, he has focused on the use of EEG to identify neural "signatures" in the first half-year of life that are associated with autism outcomes at 2 and 3 years of age. One line of work, in collaboration with Helen Tager Flusberg, PhD (Boston University), has focused on infants with an older sibling with autism (Infant Sibling Project – ISP). Such "infant sibs" have a 20% elevated likelihood of developing autism. A more recent study, in collaboration with Carol Wilkinson, MD, Ph.D., focuses on how EEG obtained in infancy can be used to predict a variety of developmental outcomes, including autism. This project takes place in a primary care setting and includes a diverse community-based population of infants, including many children growing up in low-resource and high-stress households.

Over the course of his career, Dr. Nelson has worked extensively with print, radio, internet, and television media to talk about his work; he has also given major talks to governments all over the world about the role of experience in influencing the course of human brain development, including Senate and Congressional testimony in the US and many foreign governments.

Dr. Nelson has also played leadership roles in multiple large-scale projects and endeavors; for example, from 1998-2005 he chaired the John D. and Catherine T. MacArthur Foundation Research Network on Early Experience and Brain Development, and he currently serves as the Co-Director of the Coordinating Council (along with Dr. Tina Chambers of UCSD) of the NIH-funded Healthy Brain and Child Development (HBCD) Study.

Dr. Nelson holds the Mary Deming Scott Chair in Pediatrics at Harvard Medical School; he is also a Professor of Neuroscience and a Professor of Psychology in Psychiatry at Harvard Medical School, Professor of Education at the Harvard University Graduate School of Education, and a Professor in the Department of Social and Behavioral Sciences at the Human Development and Health at the Harvard School of Public Health. Nelson is also the Director of Research and Director of the Laboratories of Cognitive Neuroscience in the Division of Developmental Medicine at Boston Children's Hospital,.

Dr. Nelson chaired the John D. and Catherine T. MacArthur Foundation Research Network on Early Experience and Brain Development and served on the National Academy of Sciences (NAS) panels that wrote From Neurons to Neighborhoods,, New Directions in Child Abuse and Neglect Research, and the Committee on the Role of Seafood Consumption on Child Growth and Development. Among his many honors he has received the Leon Eisenberg award from Harvard Medical School, an honorary Doctorate from Bucharest University (Romania), was a resident fellow at the Rockefeller Foundation Bellagio (Italy) Center, has been elected to the American Academy of Arts and Sciences, the National Academy of Medicine, the British Academy and along with Professors Fox and Zeanah has received the Ruane Prize for Child and Adolescent Psychiatric Research from the Brain & Behavior Research Foundation. In 2021 he received the Klaus J. Jacobs Research Prize. In 2023 he received the Society for Research in Child Development Distinguished Scientific Contributions to Child Development Award.

== Early career ==
Nelson completed his undergraduate degree at McGill University in Montreal in 1975. He received two master's degrees from the University of Wisconsin–Madison, an M.S. in educational psychology in 1976 and an M.S. in psychology in 1977, and received his Ph.D. in child and developmental psychology from the University of Kansas in 1981.

Under the auspices of an NIH F32 award, Nelson completed postdoctoral training in electrophysiology at the University of Minnesota from 1981 to 1983, took his first faculty position at Purdue University in 1983, and moved back to the University of Minnesota in 1986 to join the faculty in the Institute of Child Development. Nelson's research laboratory at the University of Minnesota used electroencephalography to study the development of young children, particularly face processing and memory development. Dr. Nelson moved to Harvard Medical School and Boston Children's Hospital in 2005.

== Nelson Lab Studies ==
=== Bucharest Early Intervention Project (BEIP) ===
Nelson is a lead researcher in the Bucharest Early Intervention Project, along with colleagues Nathan Fox and Charles Zeanah. The three researchers began the project in Bucharest, Romania, in 2000. In the study, infants, abandoned since birth and raised in institutions in Bucharest, were randomly assigned either to be removed from the institution and placed into foster care or to remain in the institutions. The study is designed to examine the effects of institutionalization on the brain and behavioral development of young children and to determine if these effects can be remediated through intervention, in this case foster care. To date, BEIP has demonstrated that children raised in institutions suffer from a range of significant developmental challenges, and that children removed from institutional care and placed in high-quality foster care have far better developmental outcomes than children who remain in institutions, but the degree of recovery from institutional care is largely mediated by how long children remain in an institution.

The project has continued to follow participants through adolescence and into adulthood. More recent work has examined the long-term effects of early institutionalization and foster care on brain and behavioral development, adaptive functioning, physical health, and other outcomes. The longitudinal findings have continued to show that the timing and quality of early caregiving experiences are associated with developmental outcomes later in life.

=== Bangladesh Early Adversity Project (BEAN) ===
The Bangladesh Early Adversity Project aims to assess the effects of early adversities (e.g., biological, environmental, psychosocial) on child cognitive development. To do this, Nelson established a neuroimaging lab in Dhaka, Bangladesh, where the project studies numerous cohorts below 5 years of age using methods such as EEG, fNIRS, and MRI as well as behavioral measures.

Work from the BEAN project has continued to examine how biological and psychosocial adversity are associated with brain and cognitive development. Studies from the project have examined factors such as socioeconomic conditions, nutrition, growth, and inflammation using measures including EEG, fNIRS, MRI, and behavioral assessments.

=== Emotion Project ===
The Emotion Project is a large, longitudinal study that explores how the nature and neural architecture of emotion processing develops from infancy to early childhood. 807 typically-developing infants participated in the study at either 5, 7, or 12 months of age. The data collected over the course of this study helped Nelson and his collaborator, Dr. Michelle Bosquet, assess how young children's differing perceptions of emotions could predict future childhood behaviors, particularly internalizing disorders.

=== Infant Sibling Project and Infant Screening Project ===
Despite tremendous advances being made in human understanding of autism spectrum disorder (ASD), the average age of diagnosis of an ASD in the United States is ~4 years of age, although in some cases a reliable diagnosis can be made as young as 18 months. The goal of the Infant Sibling and Infant Screening Projects is to find signs that suggest risk for this disorder between infants with an older sibling with an autism spectrum disorder, typically developing infants, and those displaying developmental concern based on early differences detected on a screening tool.

=== Baby Steps Study ===
The Baby Steps Study is an extension of the Infant Sibling/Screening projects and is a longitudinal study being conducted in Boston Children's Hospital Primary Care Clinic. With his collaborators Drs Carol Wilkinson, Kathleen Conroy, and Helen Tager-Flusberg, the study examines whether EEG can be incorporated into a primary care setting and whether brain activity measured during infancy can help predict later developmental outcomes, including autism and developmental delay.

Baby Steps grew out of an earlier study of children growing up in low-resource urban households. The study follows a large, diverse, community-based sample of infants and includes EEG measurements collected during the first year of life. One goal of the project is to determine whether methods traditionally used in a research laboratory can be applied in a clinical setting to improve the study and early identification of developmental differences.

=== Healthy Brain and Child Development Study (HBCD) ===
Nelson is the Co-Director (along with Dr. Tina Chambers of UCSD) of the Consortium Administrative Core for the Healthy Brain and Child Development Study. HBCD is a nationwide longitudinal study designed to examine brain and behavioral development beginning during pregnancy and continuing through childhood, with particular attention to both harmful and protective environmental factors.

The HBCD consortium includes 27 recruitment sites across the United States and collected a variety of biological, behavioral, and neuroimaging measures. These include MRI, EEG, biospecimens, measures of cognitive and behavioral development, and information about children's prenatal and postnatal environments. The study began releasing data to the scientific community in 2025.

== Bibliography ==
=== Peer-reviewed journal articles ===
- Pascalis, O.; de Haan, M; Nelson, CA (17 May 2002). "Is Face Processing Species-Specific During the First Year of Life?". Science. 296 (5571): 1321–1323. Bibcode:2002Sci...296.1321P. doi:10.1126/science.1070223. PMID 12016317. S2CID 14840748.
- Costello, EJ; Pine, DS; Hammen, C; March, JS; Plotsky, PM; Weissman, MM; Biederman, J; Goldsmith, HH; Kaufman, J; Lewinsohn, PM; Hellander, M; Hoagwood, K; Koretz, DS; Nelson, CA; Leckman, JF (15 September 2002). "Development and natural history of mood disorders". Biological Psychiatry. 52 (6): 529–42. doi:10.1016/s0006-3223(02)01372-0. PMID 12361667. S2CID 3047591.
- Pascalis, O.; Scott, L. S.; Kelly, D. J.; Shannon, R. W.; Nicholson, E.; Coleman, M.; Nelson, C. A. (24 March 2005). "Plasticity of face processing in infancy". Proceedings of the National Academy of Sciences. 102 (14): 5297–5300. Bibcode:2005PNAS..102.5297P. doi:10.1073/pnas.0406627102. PMC 555965. PMID 15790676.
- Nelson CA, 3rd; Zeanah, CH; Fox, NA; Marshall, PJ; Smyke, AT; Guthrie, D (21 December 2007). "Cognitive recovery in socially deprived young children: the Bucharest Early Intervention Project". Science. 318 (5858): 1937–40. Bibcode:2007Sci...318.1937N. doi:10.1126/science.1143921. PMID 18096809. S2CID 1460630.
- Khwaja, O. S.; Ho, E.; Barnes, K. V.; O'Leary, H. M.; Pereira, L. M.; Finkelstein, Y.; Nelson, C. A.; Vogel-Farley, V.; DeGregorio, G.; Holm, I. A.; Khatwa, U.; Kapur, K.; Alexander, M. E.; Finnegan, D. M.; Cantwell, N. G.; Walco, A. C.; Rappaport, L.; Gregas, M.; Fichorova, R. N.; Shannon, M. W.; Sur, M.; Kaufmann, W. E. (12 March 2014). "Safety, pharmacokinetics, and preliminary assessment of efficacy of mecasermin (recombinant human IGF-1) for the treatment of Rett syndrome". Proceedings of the National Academy of Sciences. 111 (12): 4596–4601. Bibcode:2014PNAS..111.4596K. doi:10.1073/pnas.1311141111. PMC 3970488. PMID 24623853.
- McLaughlin, Katie A.; Sheridan, Margaret A.; Winter, Warren; Fox, Nathan A.; Zeanah, Charles H.; Nelson, Charles A. (October 2014). "Widespread Reductions in Cortical Thickness Following Severe Early-Life Deprivation: A Neurodevelopmental Pathway to Attention-Deficit/Hyperactivity Disorder". Biological Psychiatry. 76 (8): 629–638. doi:10.1016/j.biopsych.2013.08.016. PMC 3969891. PMID 24090797.
- McLaughlin, KA; Sheridan, MA; Tibu, F; Fox, NA; Zeanah, CH; Nelson CA, 3rd (5 May 2015). "Causal effects of the early caregiving environment on development of stress response systems in children". Proceedings of the National Academy of Sciences of the United States of America. 112 (18): 5637–42. Bibcode:2015PNAS..112.5637M. doi:10.1073/pnas.1423363112. PMC 4426436. PMID 25902515.
- McLaughlin, KA; Sheridan, MA; Nelson, CA (1 October 2017). "Neglect as a Violation of Species-Expectant Experience: Neurodevelopmental Consequences". Biological Psychiatry. 82 (7): 462–471. doi:10.1016/j.biopsych.2017.02.1096. PMC 5572554. PMID 28392082.
- Bosl, William J.; Tager-Flusberg, Helen; Nelson, Charles A. (1 May 2018). "EEG Analytics for Early Detection of Autism Spectrum Disorder: A data-driven approach". Scientific Reports. 8 (1): 6828. Bibcode:2018NatSR...8.6828B. doi:10.1038/s41598-018-24318-x. PMC 5931530. PMID 29717196.
- Nelson, Charles A.; Frankeberger, Jessica; Chambers, Christina D. (October 2024). "An introduction to the HEALthy Brain and Child Development (HBCD) Study". Developmental Cognitive Neuroscience. 69 101441. doi:10.1016/j.dcn.2024.101441. PMC 11422039. PMID 39293188.
- Nelson, Charles A.; Sullivan, Eileen F.; Valdes, Viviane (October 2025). "Early adversity alters brain architecture and increases susceptibility to mental health disorders". Nature Reviews Neuroscience. 26 (10): 642–656. doi:10.1038/s41583-025-00948-9. PMC 12905818. PMID 40707678.
- Conroy, Kathleen; Wilkinson, Carol L.; Francis, Brianna; Said, Alex Job; Constantino, Celia; Chung, Haerin; Tager-Flusberg, Helen; Nelson, Charles A. (March 2026). "Feasibility of Large-Scale Development-Focused EEG Research in a Hospital-Based Primary Care Setting". Academic Pediatrics. 26 (2) 103163. doi:10.1016/j.acap.2025.103163. PMC 12884331. PMID 41161483.

=== Books ===
- Lazerson, Floyd E. Bloom; Charles A. Nelson; Arlyne; Bloom, Floyd; Lazerson, Arlyne (2001). Brain, mind, and behavior (3rd ed.). New York, NY: Worth Publ. ISBN 978-0-7167-2389-9.
- Nelson, Charles A.; de Haan, Michelle; Thomas, Kathleen M. (2006). Neuroscience and Cognitive Development: The Role of Experience and the Developing Brain. New York, NY: John Wiley & Sons.
- Nelson, Charles A.; Fox, Nathan A.; Zeanah, Charles H. (2014). Romania's abandoned children: deprivation, brain development, and the struggle for recovery. Cambridge, MA: Harvard University Press.

=== Essays and reporting ===
- Nelson III, Charles A.; Fox, Nathan A.; Zeanah, Charles H. Jr (April 2013). "Anguish of the abandoned child". Child Development. Scientific American. 308 (4): 44–49. Bibcode:2013SciAm.308d..62N. doi:10.1038/scientificamerican0413-62. PMID 23539791.
