= Adult attachment disorder =

Proposed mental disorder

Adult attachment disorder (AAD) develops in adults as the result of an attachment disorder that goes untreated in childhood. It begins with children who were not allowed proper relationships with parents or guardians early in their youth, or were abused by an adult during their developmental stages. According to attachment theory, causes and symptoms of the disorder are rooted in human relationships over the course of one's life and how these relationships developed and functioned. Symptoms include neglect, dysfunction, abuse, and trust issues. These symptoms are similar to those of other attachment disorders, but focus more on relationships later in life. To be diagnosed with AAD, you must demonstrate at least 2–3 of its symptoms, including impulsiveness, desire for control, lack of trust, lack of responsibility, and addiction. The DSM-5 does not recognize it as an official disorder, but AAD is being studied by several groups and treatment is being developed. Some studies suggest splitting AAD into two types, avoidance and anxious/ambivalent. More recent and advanced medical practice advocates for four categorisations:

- Secure: Low on avoidance, low on anxiety.
- Avoidant: High on avoidance, low on anxiety.
- Anxious: Low on avoidance, high on anxiety.
- Anxious and Avoidant: High on avoidance, high on anxiety.

== Signs and symptoms ==
Adult attachment disorder develops when an attachment disorder, such as reactive attachment disorder, goes untreated in youth and continues into adulthood. Symptoms change but remain significantly similar. Some researchers have suggested that this is because adult relationships are similar to the relationship between infants and caregivers in that they are a type of attachment. Similarities between the two types of relationships include, but are not limited to, a feeling of safety when in proximity to a partner, close contact, shared interest and preoccupation with each other, and "baby talk".

While there are similarities to other attachment disorders, adult attachment disorder is starting to be recognized in its own right due to symptoms absent in other attachment disorders, such as greater likelihood of addiction, impulsiveness, socially inappropriate behavior, desire for control, trust issues, unwillingness to accept responsibility, helplessness, anxiety, superficial positivity, obsessive–compulsive disorder, and depression.

The DSM-5 does not recognize adult attachment disorder, but research on it continues and therapies for it have been proposed. The disorder has different levels of severity. All of them could benefit from therapy. Many therapies have been claimed to at least partially treat this disorder. Some are meant to prevent disorders, mostly in families that have already experienced the disorder. Other therapies include outpatient, residential, and wilderness therapy. Most of the therapies emphasize effective communication and problem-solving strategies. They also focus on finding the roots of the attachment, most likely in early childhood. One of these is a controversial treatment known as attachment holding or "in arms" treatment. This therapy is based on the theory that a child must release their frustration with caregivers before they can trust them.

== See also ==
- Attachment in adults
