= Daniel Schechter =

American neuroscientist

Daniel S. Schechter

Daniel S. Schechter (born 1962 in Miami, Florida) is an American and Swiss psychiatrist known for his clinical work and research on intergenerational transmission or "communication" of violent trauma and related psychopathology involving parents and very young children. His published work in this area following the terrorist attacks on the World Trade Center in New York of September 11, 2001 led to a co-edited book entitled "September 11: Trauma and Human Bonds" (2003) and additional original articles with clinical psychologist Susan Coates that were translated into multiple languages and remain among the first accounts of 9/11 related loss and trauma described by mental health professionals who also experienced the attacks and their aftermath Schechter observed that separation anxiety among infants and young children who had either lost or feared loss of their caregivers triggered posttraumatic stress symptoms in the surviving caregivers. These observations validated his prior work on the adverse impact of family violence on the early parent-child relationship, formative social-emotional development and related attachment disturbances involving mutual dysregulation of emotion and arousal. This body of work on trauma and attachment has been cited by prominent authors in the attachment theory, psychological trauma, developmental psychobiology and neuroscience literatures

== Career ==
Following studies in music and French literature (Oberlin Conservatory of Music, Columbia College (B.A.), and Columbia University Graduate School of Arts and Sciences (M.A.), Schechter then completed his medical training at the Columbia University College of Physicians & Surgeons. His earliest research examined the nature of mother-daughter relationships in the context of male-perpetrated child sexual abuse as well as trauma-related culture-bound syndromes in an inner-city Caribbean Hispanic community.

Funding through the American Academy of Child and Adolescent Psychiatry, allowed Schechter to travel to Tulane University in New Orleans, beginning in 1998, to study with infant mental health specialist Charles H. Zeanah. They subsequently collaborated on several projects and articles related to the effects of psychological trauma and posttraumatic stress disorder (PTSD) on the relationship of infants, young children, and their parents as well as related attachment disorder. This collaboration along with involvement as a Zero to Three: National Center for Infants, Toddlers, and Families Solnit Fellow (1999–2001), encouraged Schechter to pursue further research training in developmental neuroscience through a NIH-funded research fellowship in developmental psychobiology with Myron Hofer and Michael Myers at the New York State Psychiatric Institute. In 2003, Schechter received an NIMH Research Career Award to fund the project "Maternal Posttraumatic Stress Disorder and Interactive Behavior with Very Young Children" which was completed in 2008. In that same year, Schechter was recruited to Geneva, Switzerland, to become the director of Pediatric Consult-Liaison and Parent-Child Research in the Department of Child and Adolescent Psychiatry at the University of Geneva Hospitals. He served as Senior Lecturer in Psychiatry within the Faculty of Medicine, University of Geneva from 2012 to 2022.

In Geneva, his clinical research efforts focused on the effects of parental violence-related traumatic stress on the parent-child relationship and child developmental outcomes in the domains of emotion and arousal regulation, together with related biomarkers, that might contribute to intergenerational cycles of violence and victimization. Schechter was appointed in 2018 as Barakett Associate Professor of Child and Adolescent Psychiatry at the New York University School of Medicine where he served as Director of the research Center for Stress, Trauma, and Resilience and Medical Director of Perinatal and Early Childhood Mental Health Services. In July, 2019, he returned to Switzerland to assume medical directorship together with psychologist Josée Despars of a newly created parent-child ambulatory care program for ages 0–5 "PAPILLON" within the child and adolescent psychiatry service (SUPEA) of the Lausanne University Hospital. There, he also co-directs with Dr. Mathilde Morisod the SUPEA Perinatal and Early Childhood Training and Research Group "SPECTRE". He is currently a tenured professor of psychiatry (in child and adolescent psychiatry) at the Faculty of Biology and Medicine of the Lausanne University.

Schechter's work has received a number of awards including: Pierre Janet and Sandor Ferenczi Scientific Paper Prizes from the International Society for the Study of Trauma and Dissociation (2007 and 2018 respectively), the Hayman Prize for Best Published Work Relevant to Traumatized Children or Adults (2015) and multiple Significant Contribution to Research Awards from the International Psychoanalytical Association (2005, 2009, 2013, 2015, 2021, 2023), as well as three Norbert and Charlotte Rieger Paper Prizes from the American Academy of Child and Adolescent Psychiatry (2010, 2015, 2017). His publications with psychologist Dominik Moser and neuroscientist Virginie Pointet were awarded Best Scientific Paper Prizes by the French Psychiatric Association (2014, 2019) and the French Society of Child and Adolescent Psychiatry (2024). He has additionally received the John J. Weber Research Prize from Columbia University and the Kernberg Scientific Achievement Award from Cornell University Departments of Psychiatry respectively

=== Helping traumatized parents "change their minds about their young children" ===
During his work as director of infant mental health services at the Columbia University Medical Center (1998–2008), Schechter found that the large majority of inner-city mothers who were requesting consultation for their infants and young children for reasons of behavioral difficulties had histories of childhood maltreatment and/or family violence victimization and exposure, often with related psychiatric sequelae (i.e. PTSD, major depression, dissociation, and personality disorder). He further observed that many of these traumatized mothers, despite their best intentions, not only had great difficulty in "reading" and tolerating their infants' distress, but that they also had a tendency to misattribute their children's intentions and personality characteristics. As a result, the child, in an effort to maintain an attachment with the traumatized parent, would conform to these misattributions and/or attempt to join the parent's hypervigilant mental state, leading to a traumatically skewed intersubjectivity Children of these traumatized mothers also show increased PTSD symptoms, externalizing symptoms and attachment disturbances that are mediated by maternal PTSD severity.

Schechter and colleagues developed an experimental paradigm informed by attachment theory called the Clinician Assisted Videofeedback Exposure Sessions (CAVES) to test whether mothers could "change their mind" about their young children if helped to watch video-excerpts of play, separation and similarly stressful moments in the presence of a clinician who asks the mother to think about what she (and her child) might be thinking and feeling at the time of the excerpt and at the moment of videofeedback. Thus this technique applies principles of mentalization as an aide to emotional regulation with traumatized parents This technique also involves elements of prolonged exposure treatment—in other words confronting avoidance of trauma-related negative emotions, the video-based treatment Interaction Guidance, and psychodynamically oriented child-parent psychotherapy Schechter and colleagues showed a significant change in the way mothers perceived their own child and their relationship together. Schechter, Rusconi Serpa, and colleagues have manualized a 16-session psychotherapy for violence-exposed mothers, their infants and young children that builds upon the CAVES technique. This treatment is called Clinician Assisted Videofeedback Exposure-Approach Therapy (CAVEAT) and currently is in funded open-trial.

=== Intergenerational communication of violent trauma ===
Schechter has studied how the distressed toddler can trigger a parent's posttraumatic stress marked by a) emotional unavailability or frank avoidance and b) how parents communicate— often unintentionally, memories of their own violent traumatic experiences. In relation to emotional unavailability, Schechter and colleagues' found that mothers with interpersonal-violence related PTSD, while not showing differences in their capacity to jointly attend to play with their toddlers before a stressor when compared to control-subjects, show significant limitation in their responsiveness to their toddlers upon reunion following separation stress. This is despite the finding that children of PTSD mothers show no greater distress during separation than those of controls. And in relation to communication of traumatic experience, following from the work of Scheeringa and Zeanah, Schechter explored the implicit and explicit non-verbal and verbal ways parents communicate their traumatic experiences to their children who may or may not have been present during these violent events. In particular, Schechter has shown how a parent can vicariously and unintentionally transmit her prior experiences of interpersonal violence to her child through her behavior and narrative associations by doing or saying something— or drawing connections between actions and/or language, that the child cannot place in any familiar context, but that is by its nature, frightening or even traumatizing. His work has demonstrated this both in routine daily interactions, laboratory observations, and in violent-media viewing practices by mothers and their toddlers in the home. He has hypothesized that this inadvertent intergenerational transmission is often an effect of traumatized mothers' efforts to control their own psychophysiological dysregulation that is linked to their posttraumatic psychopathology. This was, for example, demonstrated with regards to the hypothalamic-pituitary-adrenal (HPA) axis in the first publication on maternal physiologic response to child separation, and in a parallel study subsequently, in relation to the autonomic nervous system response.

Schechter and colleagues have in addition to maternal behavioral and physiological dysregulation, also found at the level of maternal brain activity, corticolimbic dysregulation on functional neuroimaging as associated with maternal PTSD and dissociative symptoms in response to child separation and adult male-female violence-related video-stimuli in both New York and Geneva samples The same pattern of corticolimbic dysregulation has also been associated with increased parenting stress, HPA axis dysregulation as marked by decreased methylation of the glucocorticoid receptor gene, and observed child behavioral difficulty during mother-child play.

An important motivation for traumatized parents, Schechter and colleagues have found is the conscious aim of the traumatized parent to interrupt intergenerational cycles of violence and trauma so that her child does not have to suffer the emotional and often physical pain that she had experienced as a child. As Schechter and Willheim describe, this can be a long and difficult process for families—and one that requires that the therapist be prepared to intervene thoughtfully (i.e. modeling and stimulating parental mentalization) as much in-the-moment in response to real-life events reported by the parents and professionals (i.e. pediatricians, daycare and preschool staff, child protective agencies, the courts) as during parent-child sessions. The work with parents and their relationship with their child often needs to continue, when possible and feasible. As infants and young children and their needs are so rapidly developing, and as their parents find themselves in a parallel phase of adult development during which they are more open to change, the therapist can be surprised by quick, positive shifts in relational patterns within the context of both brief consultations and long-term treatments such as for caregivers with complex PTSD and their young children.

=== Infant and early childhood mental health advocacy ===
Schechter served as a key member of the New York City Early Childhood Mental Health Strategic Work Group, an advisory group to the New York City Department of Health and Mental Hygiene under the direction of Evelyn Blanck from 2004 to 2008. In 2005, the Workgroup published a White Paper,“Promoting the Mental Health and Healthy Development of New York’s Infants, Toddlers and Preschoolers, A Call to Action,” that has been used to effectively advocate for mental health services for children from birth to age 5 across all child-serving systems in New York City and New York State. This paper was instrumental in the inclusion of infants and toddlers in the Child and Families Clinic Plus Initiative implemented by the New York State Office of Mental Health, thus officially recognized for the first time as under the responsibility for care by state licensed child and adolescent mental health clinical programs. An updated version of the White Paper was reviewed favorably in 2011 by the New York State Mental Health Commissioner's Office.
