= Nathan Fox (psychologist) =

Developmental psychologist

Nathan A. Fox
- Occupation: Distinguished University Professor

Academic background
- Education: Williams College, Harvard University

Academic work
- Institutions: University of Maryland
- Main interests: Human Development, Quantitative Methodology

Nathan A. Fox is a developmental psychologist known for his contributions to understanding how environmental factors affect early development. He holds the position of Distinguished University Professor of Human Development and Quantitative Methodology at the University of Maryland.

Fox is known for his involvement in the Bucharest Early Intervention Project, a longitudinal study of the effects of social deprivation experienced by children who were abandoned by their families and living in institutions in Bucharest, Romania. He and his colleagues Charles Nelson III, and Charles H. Zeanah are all Principal Investigators of the study. The Bucharest Early Intervention Project was a randomized controlled trial examining the impact of foster care as an intervention for children abandoned at birth. The study tracked children's neuropsychological and cognitive development from infancy through adolescence using metrics such as electroencephalography (EEG), fMRI, and language and cognitive assessments. Findings of this study have been discussed in The New York Times, Nature, and many other media outlets.

== Biography ==
Fox received a Bachelor's degree in Political Science with honors from Williams College in 1970. From there, he went on to receive his Ph.D. in Psychology and Social Relations from Harvard University in 1975 and worked as a Postdoctoral fellow at Harvard in the field of cross-cultural child development. Fox's dissertation research examined effects of birth order on attachment styles of infants living in kibbutz, Israel. his research also compared the attachment styles of infants with their mother versus their caregiver.

After Fox received his PhD he went on to work as an assistant professor teaching Clinical Pediatric Psychology at Columbia University from 1978-1982. At the same time, Fox briefly worked at the New School for Social Research as a visiting lecturer from 1981-1992 before moving to Maryland. In Maryland, Fox worked as an assistant professor in the University of Maryland's Department of Human Development. Fox has stayed at the University of Maryland since then. Fox became a Distinguished University Professor at University of Maryland in 2011.

Fox has been involved in numerous committees. His first committee was at the U.S Consumer Product Safety Commission in 1982. During his time, he worked to ensure safety compliances for children's products. He was also on a few National Institute of Health's committees; where he was a reviewer for several programs such as the Child Health and Development panel. Fox served as President of the International Congress of Infant Studies from 1988-1990, and as President of Division 7 (Developmental Psychology) of the American Psychological Association from 2001-2002.

In 2014, Fox co-authored with Charles Nelson and Charles H. Zeanah Romania's abandoned children: deprivation, brain development, and the struggle for recovery, a book reporting findings related to The Bucharest Early Intervention Project. The Bucharest Early Intervention Project aimed to understand effects of social deprivation on infants. The project increased understanding of the welfare of abandoned infants and how their physical and mental behavior may change with increased access to caregivers.

Agencies that have supported Fox's work include the Brain and Behavior Research Foundation, the National Science Foundation, and the National Institutes of Health. Projects include the Healthy Brain and Child Development National Consortium, the Neural Origins of Temperamental Risk for Anxiety, and Effects of Early Psychosocial Deprivation on Mental Health in Early Adulthood.

== Research ==
Fox's research program has closely examined infant emotionality and temperament, to understand how these factors are associated with individual differences in behavior and self-regulation later in life. Some of Fox's most cited research focuses on development of behavioral inhibition, which is a temperament related to the experience of distress and withdrawal from unfamiliar environments. In one of his studies, he used EEG in a longitudinal study to trace continuities and discontinuities in behavioral inhibition from infancy through age four.

Fox currently spearheads the Child Development Lab, which is involved in multiple studies that observe of infant behavior and development. These studies include; The HEALthy Brain and Child Development (H.B.C.D), a longitudinal study launched in April 2018 that focuses on the understanding prenatal substance abuse and its effects on brain development and behavior, The National Institute's of Health (NIH) HEAL (Helping to End Addiction Long-Term) Initiative, and the Temperament Over Time Study (T.O.T.S), another on-going longitudinal study exploring environmental and other factors that may affect social development. Some participants of the T.O.T.S have been involved since four months of age. The researchers plan to track the social development of the participants over the course of 15 years.

Fox's research has made important contributions to the field of child development, specifically in regards to understanding how the temperament of the child, their caregivers, the environment, and many other factors influence developmental outcomes. He has played a pivotal role in shaping how research is conducted in the field and continues to push on, with many projects still underway.

== Awards ==
- Ruane Prize for Outstanding Achievement in Child and Adolescent Psychiatric Research, Brain & Behavior Research Foundation (2017)
- APA G. Stanley Hall Award for Lifelong Achievement in Developmental Science (2017)
- Distinguished Mentor Award, American Psychological Association (Division 7) (2016)
- Maureen Evans Award, Joint Council on International Children’s Services (2013)
- Distinguished Investigator Grant, Brain & Behavior Research Foundation(2007)

== Books ==
- Nelson, C. A., Fox, N. A., Zeanah, C. H. (2014). Romania’s abandoned children: Deprivation, brain development, and the struggle for recovery. Harvard University Press.

== Representative publications ==
- Calkins, S. D., & Fox, N. A. (2002). Self-regulatory processes in early personality development: A multilevel approach to the study of childhood social withdrawal and aggression. Development and Psychopathology, 14(3), 477-498. DOI: 10.1017.S095457940200305X
- Davidson, R. J., & Fox, N. A. (1982). Asymmetrical brain activity discriminates between positive and negative affective stimuli in human infants. Science, 218(4578), 1235-1237. DOI: 10.1126/science.7146906
- Fox, N. A., & Calkins, S. D. (2003). The development of self-control of emotion: Intrinsic and extrinsic influences. Motivation and emotion, 27(1), 7-26. DOI: 10.1.1.357.3482
- Fox, N. A., Henderson, H. A., Rubin, K. H., Calkins, S. D., & Schmidt, L. A. (2001). Continuity and discontinuity of behavioral inhibition and exuberance: Psychophysiological and behavioral influences across the first four years of life. Child Development, 72(1), 1-21. DOI: 10.1111/1467–8624.00262
- Nelson III, C. A., Zeanah, C. H., Fox, N. A., Marshall, P. J., Smyke, A. T., & Guthrie, D. (2007). Cognitive recovery in socially deprived young children: The Bucharest Early Intervention Project. Science, 318(5858), 1937-1940. DOI: 10.1126/science.1143921
