= Reactive attachment disorder =

Psychological disorder that can affect children

- Specialty: Psychiatry, pediatrics

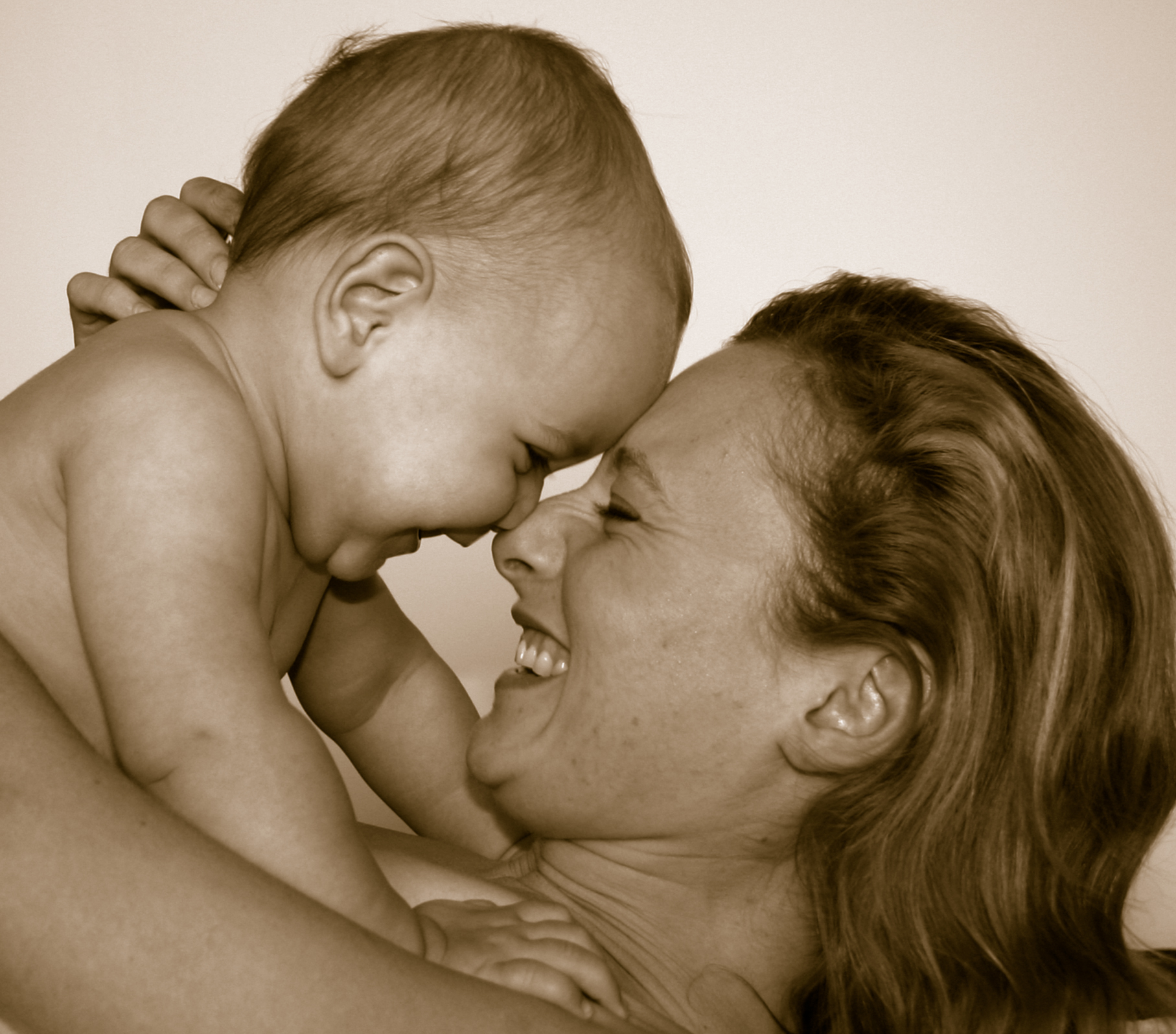
Child face to face with mother

Reactive attachment disorder (RAD) is an attachment disorder characterized by markedly disturbed and developmentally inappropriate ways of relating socially in most contexts. RAD primarily affects children, although these issues do occasionally persist into adulthood. It can take the form of a persistent failure to initiate or respond to most social interactions in a developmentally appropriate way—known as the "inhibited form". In the DSM-5, the "disinhibited form" is considered a separate diagnosis named "disinhibited social engagement disorder".

RAD arises from a failure to form normal attachments to primary caregivers in early childhood. Such a failure could result from severe early experiences of neglect, abuse, abrupt separation from caregivers between the ages of six months and three years, frequent changes of caregivers, or a lack of caregiver responsiveness to a child's communicative efforts. It is differentiated from pervasive developmental disorder or developmental delay and from possibly comorbid conditions such as intellectual disability, all of which can affect attachment behavior. The criteria for a diagnosis of reactive attachment disorder are very different from the criteria used in assessment or categorization of attachment styles, such as insecure or disorganized attachment.

Children with RAD are presumed to have grossly disturbed internal working models of relationships that may lead to interpersonal and behavioral difficulties in later life. There are few studies of long-term effects, and there is a lack of clarity about the presentation of the disorder beyond the age of five years. However, the opening of orphanages in Eastern Europe following the end of the Cold War in the early 1990s provided opportunities for research on infants and toddlers brought up in very deprived conditions. Such research broadened the understanding of the prevalence, causes, mechanisms and assessment of disorders of attachment and led to efforts from the late 1990s onwards to develop treatment and prevention programs and better methods of assessment. Mainstream theorists in the field have proposed that a broader range of conditions arising from problems with attachment should be defined beyond current classifications.

Mainstream treatment and prevention programs that target RAD and other problematic early attachment behaviors are based on attachment theory and concentrate on increasing the responsiveness and sensitivity of the caregiver, or if that is not possible, placing the child with a different caregiver. Most such strategies are in the process of being evaluated. Mainstream practitioners and theorists^{who?} have presented significant criticism of the diagnosis and treatment of alleged reactive attachment disorder or the theoretically baseless "attachment disorder" within the controversial form of psychotherapy commonly known as attachment therapy. Attachment therapy has a scientifically unsupported theoretical base and uses diagnostic criteria or symptom lists markedly different from criteria under ICD-10 or DSM-IV-TR, or to attachment behaviors. A range of treatment approaches are used in attachment therapy, some of which are physically and psychologically coercive, and considered to be antithetical to attachment theory.

== Signs and symptoms ==
Pediatricians are often the first health professionals to assess and raise suspicions of RAD in children with the disorder. The initial presentation varies according to the child's developmental and chronological age, although it always involves a disturbance in social interaction. Infants up to about 18–24 months may present with non-organic failure to thrive and display abnormal responsiveness to stimuli. Laboratory investigations will be unremarkable barring possible findings consistent with malnutrition or dehydration, while serum growth hormone levels will be normal or elevated.

The core feature is severely inappropriate social relating by affected children. This can manifest itself in two ways:

1. Indiscriminate and excessive attempts to receive comfort and affection from any available adult, even relative strangers (older children and adolescents may also make attempts at peers). This may often appear as a denial of comfort from anyone as well.
2. Extreme reluctance to initiate or accept comfort and affection, even from familiar adults, especially when distressed.

While RAD occurs in relation to neglectful and abusive treatment, automatic diagnoses on this basis alone cannot be made, as children can, although this is rare, form stable attachments and social relationships despite elevated abuse and neglect.

The name of the disorder emphasizes problems with attachment but the criteria include symptoms such as failure to thrive, a lack of developmentally appropriate social responsiveness, apathy, and onset before 8 months.

=== Assessment tools ===
There is as yet no universally accepted diagnostic protocol for reactive attachment disorder. Often, a range of measures is used in research and diagnosis. Recognized assessment methods of attachment styles, difficulties or disorders include the Strange Situation Procedure (devised by developmental psychologist Mary Ainsworth), the separation and reunion procedure and the Preschool Assessment of Attachment, the Observational Record of the Caregiving Environment, the Attachment Q-sort and a variety of narrative techniques using stem stories, puppets or pictures. For older children, actual interviews such as the Child Attachment Interview and the Autobiographical Emotional Events Dialogue can be used. Caregivers may also be assessed using procedures such as the Working Model of the Child Interview.

More recent research also uses the Disturbances of Attachment Interview (DAI) developed by Smyke and Zeanah (1999). The DAI is a semi-structured interview designed to be administered by clinicians to caregivers. It covers 12 items, namely "having a discriminated, preferred adult", "seeking comfort when distressed", "responding to comfort when offered", "social and emotional reciprocity", "emotional regulation", "checking back after venturing away from the care giver", "reticence with unfamiliar adults", "willingness to go off with relative strangers", "self-endangering behavior", "excessive clinging", "vigilance/hypercompliance" and "role reversal". This method is designed to pick up not only RAD but also the proposed new alternative categories of disorders of attachment.

== Causes ==
Although increasing numbers of childhood mental health problems are being attributed to genetic defects, reactive attachment disorder is by definition based on a problematic history of care and social relationships. Abuse can occur alongside the required factors, but on its own does not explain attachment disorder. It has been suggested that types of temperament, or constitutional response to the environment, may make some individuals susceptible to the stress of unpredictable or hostile relationships with caregivers in the early years. In the absence of available and responsive caregivers it appears that most children are particularly vulnerable to developing attachment disorders.

While similar abnormal parenting may produce the two distinct forms of the disorder, inhibited and disinhibited, studies show that abuse and neglect were far more prominent and severe in the cases of RAD, disinhibited type. The issue of temperament and its influence on the development of attachment disorders has yet to be resolved. RAD has never been reported in the absence of serious environmental adversity yet outcomes for children raised in the same environment are the same.

In discussing the neurobiological basis for attachment and trauma symptoms in a seven-year twin study, it has been suggested that the roots of various forms of psychopathology, including RAD, borderline personality disorder (BPD), and post-traumatic stress disorder (PTSD), can be found in disturbances in affect regulation. The subsequent development of higher-order self-regulation is jeopardized and the formation of internal models is affected. Consequently, the "templates" in the mind that drive organized behavior in relationships may be impacted. The potential for "re-regulation" (modulation of emotional responses to within the normal range) in the presence of "corrective" experiences (normative caregiving) seems possible.

== Diagnosis ==
RAD is one of the least researched and most poorly understood disorders in the DSM. There is little systematic epidemiologic information on RAD, its course is not well established and it appears difficult to diagnose accurately. There is a lack of clarity about the presentation of attachment disorders over the age of five years and difficulty in distinguishing between aspects of attachment disorders, disorganized attachment or the consequences of maltreatment.

According to the American Academy of Child and Adolescent Psychiatry (AACAP), children who exhibit signs of reactive attachment disorder need a comprehensive psychiatric assessment and individualized treatment plan. The signs or symptoms of RAD may also be found in other psychiatric disorders and AACAP advises against giving a child this label or diagnosis without a comprehensive evaluation. Their practice parameter states that the assessment of reactive attachment disorder requires evidence directly obtained from serial observations of the child interacting with their primary caregivers and history (as available) of the child's patterns of attachment behavior with these caregivers. It also requires observations of the child's behavior with unfamiliar adults and a comprehensive history of the child's early caregiving environment including, for example, pediatricians, teachers, or caseworkers. In the US, initial evaluations may be conducted by psychologists, psychiatrists, Licensed Marriage and Family Therapists, Licensed Professional Counselors, specialist Licensed Clinical Social Workers or psychiatric nurses.

In the UK, the British Association for Adoption and Fostering (BAAF) advise that only a psychiatrist can diagnose an attachment disorder and that any assessment must include a comprehensive evaluation of the child's individual and family history.

According to the AACAP Practice Parameter (2005) the question of whether attachment disorders can reliably be diagnosed in older children and adults has not been resolved. Attachment behaviors used for the diagnosis of RAD change markedly with development and defining analogous behaviors in older children is difficult. There are no substantially validated measures of attachment in middle childhood or early adolescence. Assessments of RAD past school age may not be possible at all as by this time children have developed along individual lines to such an extent that early attachment experiences are only one factor among many that determine emotion and behavior.

=== Criteria ===
ICD-10 describes reactive attachment disorder of childhood and disinhibited attachment disorder (DAD). The DSM-IV-TR also describes reactive attachment disorder of infancy or early childhood divided into two subtypes, inhibited type and disinhibited type, both known as RAD. The two classifications are similar and both include:

- markedly disturbed and developmentally inappropriate social relatedness in most contexts (e.g., the child is avoidant or unresponsive to care when offered by caregivers or is indiscriminately affectionate with strangers);
- the disturbance is not accounted for solely by developmental delay and does not meet the criteria for pervasive developmental disorder;
- onset before five years of age (there is no age specified before five years of age at which RAD cannot be diagnosed);
- a history of significant neglect;
- an implicit lack of identifiable, preferred attachment figure.

ICD-10 states in relation to the inhibited form only that the syndrome probably occurs as a direct result of severe parental neglect, abuse, or serious mishandling. DSM states in relation to both forms there must be a history of "pathogenic care" defined as persistent disregard of the child's basic emotional or physical needs or repeated changes in primary caregiver that prevents the formation of a discriminatory or selective attachment that is presumed to account for the disorder. For this reason, part of the diagnosis is the child's history of care rather than observation of symptoms.

In DSM-IV-TR the inhibited form is described as persistent failure to initiate or respond in a developmentally appropriate fashion to most social interactions, as manifest by excessively inhibited, hypervigilant, or highly ambivalent and contradictory responses (e.g., the child may respond to caregivers with a mixture of approach, avoidance, and resistance to comforting or may exhibit "frozen watchfulness", hypervigilance while keeping an impassive and still demeanour). Such infants do not seek or accept comfort at times of threat, alarm or distress, thus failing to maintain "proximity", an essential element of attachment behavior. The disinhibited form shows diffuse attachments as manifest by indiscriminate sociability with marked inability to exhibit appropriate selective attachments (e.g., excessive familiarity with relative strangers or lack of selectivity in choice of attachment figures). There is therefore a lack of "specificity" of attachment figure, the second basic element of attachment behavior.

The ICD-10 descriptions are comparable save that ICD-10 includes in its description several elements not included in DSM-IV-TR as follows:

- abuse, (psychological or physical), in addition to neglect;
- associated emotional disturbance;
- poor social interaction with peers, aggression towards self and others, misery, and growth failure in some cases (inhibited form only);
- evidence of capacity for social reciprocity and responsiveness as shown by elements of normal social relatedness in interactions with appropriately responsive, non-deviant adults (disinhibited form only).

The first of these is somewhat controversial, being a commission rather than omission and because abuse in and of itself does not lead to attachment disorder.

The inhibited form has a greater tendency to ameliorate with an appropriate caregiver, while the disinhibited form is more enduring. ICD-10 states the disinhibited form "tends to persist despite marked changes in environmental circumstances". Disinhibited and inhibited are not opposites in terms of attachment disorder and can coexist in the same child. The question of whether there are two subtypes has been raised. The World Health Organization acknowledges that there is uncertainty regarding the diagnostic criteria and the appropriate subdivision. One reviewer has commented on the difficulty of clarifying the core characteristics of and differences between atypical attachment styles and ways of categorizing more severe disorders of attachment.

As of 2010, the American Psychiatric Association has proposed to redefine RAD into two distinct disorders in the DSM-V. Corresponding with the inhibited type, one disorder will be reclassified as Reactive Attachment Disorder of Infancy and Early Childhood.

In regards to pathogenic care, or the type of care in which these behaviors are present, a new criterion for Disinhibited Social Engagement Disorder now includes chronically harsh punishment or other types of severely inept caregiving. Relating to pathogenic care for both proposed disorders, a new criterion is rearing in atypical environments such as institutions with high child/caregiver ratios that cut down on opportunities to form attachments with a caregiver.

=== Differential diagnosis ===
The diagnostic complexities of RAD mean that careful diagnostic evaluation by a trained mental health expert with particular expertise in differential diagnosis is considered essential. Several other disorders, such as conduct disorders, oppositional defiant disorder, anxiety disorders, post traumatic stress disorder and social phobia share many symptoms and are often comorbid with or confused with RAD, leading to over and under diagnosis. RAD can also be confused with neuropsychiatric disorders such as autism, pervasive developmental disorder, childhood schizophrenia and some genetic syndromes. Infants with this disorder can be distinguished from those with organic illness by their rapid physical improvement after hospitalization. Autistic children are likely to be of normal size and weight and often exhibit a degree of intellectual disability. They are unlikely to improve upon being removed from the home.

=== Alternative diagnosis ===
In the absence of a standardized diagnosis system, many popular, informal classification systems or checklists, outside the DSM and ICD, were created out of clinical and parental experience within the field known as attachment therapy. These lists are unvalidated and critics state they are inaccurate, too broadly defined or applied by unqualified persons. Many are found on the websites of attachment therapists. Common elements of these lists such as lying, lack of remorse or conscience and cruelty do not form part of the diagnostic criteria under either DSM-IV-TR or ICD-10. Many children are being diagnosed with RAD because of behavioral problems that are outside the criteria. There is an emphasis within attachment therapy on aggressive behavior as a symptom of what they describe as attachment disorder whereas mainstream theorists view these behaviors as comorbid, externalizing behaviors requiring appropriate assessment and treatment rather than attachment disorders. However, knowledge of attachment relationships can contribute to the cause, maintenance and treatment of externalizing disorders.

The Randolph Attachment Disorder Questionnaire or RADQ is one of the better known of these checklists and is used by attachment therapists and others. The checklist includes 93 discrete behaviours, many of which either overlap with other disorders, like conduct disorder and oppositional defiant disorder, or are not related to attachment difficulties. Critics assert that it is unvalidated and lacks specificity.

== Treatment ==
Assessing the child's safety is an essential first step that determines whether future intervention can take place in the family unit or whether the child should be removed to a safe situation. Interventions may include psychosocial support services for the family unit (including financial or domestic aid, housing and social work support), psychotherapeutic interventions (including treating parents for mental illness, family therapy, individual therapy), education (including training in basic parenting skills and child development), and monitoring of the child's safety within the family environment

In 2005 the American Academy of Child and Adolescent Psychiatry laid down guidelines (devised by N.W. Boris and C.H. Zeanah) based on its published parameters for the diagnosis and treatment of RAD. Recommendations in the guidelines include the following:

1. "The most important intervention for young children diagnosed with reactive attachment disorder and who lack an attachment to a discriminated caregiver is for the clinician to advocate for providing the child with an emotionally available attachment figure."
2. "Although the diagnosis of reactive attachment disorder is based on symptoms displayed by the child, assessing the caregiver's attitudes toward and perceptions about the child is important for treatment selection."
3. "Children with reactive attachment disorder are presumed to have grossly disturbed internal models for relating to others. After ensuring that the child is in a safe and stable placement, effective attachment treatment must focus on creating positive interactions with caregivers."
4. "Children who meet criteria for reactive attachment disorder and who display aggressive and oppositional behavior require adjunctive (additional) treatments."

Mainstream prevention programs and treatment approaches for attachment difficulties or disorders for infants and younger children are based on attachment theory and concentrate on increasing the responsiveness and sensitivity of the caregiver, or if that is not possible, placing the child with a different caregiver. These approaches are mostly in the process of being evaluated. The programs invariably include a detailed assessment of the attachment status or caregiving responses of the adult caregiver as attachment is a two-way process involving attachment behavior and caregiver response. Some of these treatment or prevention programs are specifically aimed at foster carers rather than parents, as the attachment behaviors of infants or children with attachment difficulties often do not elicit appropriate caregiver responses. Approaches include "Watch, wait and wonder," manipulation of sensitive responsiveness, modified "Interaction Guidance", "Clinician-Assisted Videofeedback Exposure Sessions (CAVES)", "Preschool Parent Psychotherapy", "Circle of Security", "Attachment and Biobehavioral Catch-up" (ABC), the New Orleans Intervention, and parent–child psychotherapy. Other treatment methods include Developmental, Individual-difference, and Relationship-based therapy (DIR, also referred to as Floor Time) by Stanley Greenspan, although DIR is primarily directed to treatment of pervasive developmental disorders.

The relevance of these approaches to intervention with fostered and adopted children with RAD or older children with significant histories of maltreatment is unclear.

=== Attachment therapy ===
Outside the mainstream programs is a form of treatment generally known as attachment therapy, a subset of techniques (and accompanying novel diagnosis) for attachment disorders including RAD. These "attachment disorders" use diagnostic criteria or symptom lists different from criteria under ICD-10 or DSM-IV-TR, or to attachment behaviors. Those with "attachment disorder" are said to lack empathy and remorse.

Treatments of this scientific disorder are called "Attachment therapy". In general, these therapies are aimed at adopted or fostered children with a view to creating attachment in these children to their new caregivers. The theoretical base is broadly a combination of regression and catharsis, accompanied by parenting methods which emphasize obedience and parental control. There is considerable criticism of this form of treatment and diagnosis as it is largely unvalidated and has developed outside the scientific mainstream. There is little or no evidence base and techniques vary from non-coercive therapeutic work to more extreme forms of physical, confrontational and coercive techniques, of which the best known are holding therapy, rebirthing, rage-reduction and the Evergreen model. These forms of the therapy may well involve physical restraint, the deliberate provocation of rage and anger in the child by physical and verbal means including deep tissue massage, aversive tickling, enforced eye contact and verbal confrontation, and being pushed to revisit earlier trauma. Critics maintain that these therapies are not within the attachment paradigm, are potentially abusive, and are antithetical to attachment theory. The APSAC Taskforce Report of 2006 notes that many of these therapies concentrate on changing the child rather than the caregiver. Children may be described as "RADs" and dire predictions may be made as to their supposedly violent futures if they are not treated with attachment therapy. The Mayo Clinic, a well known U.S. non-profit medical practice and medical research group, cautions against consulting with mental health providers who promote these types of methods and offer evidence to support their techniques; to date, this evidence base is not published within reputable medical or mental health journals.

== Prognosis ==
The AACAP guidelines state that children with reactive attachment disorder are presumed to have grossly disturbed internal models for relating to others. However, the course of RAD is not well studied and there have been few efforts to examine symptom patterns over time. The few existing longitudinal studies (dealing with developmental change with age over a period of time) involve only children from poorly run Eastern European institutions.

Findings from the studies of children from Eastern European orphanages indicate that persistence of the inhibited pattern of RAD is rare in children adopted out of institutions into normative care-giving environments. However, there is a close association between duration of deprivation and severity of attachment disorder behaviors. The quality of attachments that these children form with subsequent care-givers may be compromised, but they probably no longer meet criteria for inhibited RAD. The same group of studies suggests that a minority of adopted, institutionalized children exhibit persistent indiscriminate sociability even after more normative caregiving environments are provided. Indiscriminate sociability may persist for years, even among children who subsequently exhibit preferred attachment to their new caregivers. Some exhibit hyperactivity and attention problems as well as difficulties in peer relationships. In the only longitudinal study that has followed children with indiscriminate behavior into adolescence, these children were significantly more likely to exhibit poor peer relationships.

Studies of children who were reared in institutions have suggested that they are inattentive and overactive, no matter what quality of care they received. In one investigation, some institution-reared boys were reported to be inattentive, overactive, and markedly unselective in their social relationships, while girls, foster-reared children, and some institution-reared children were not. It is not yet clear whether these behaviors should be considered as part of disordered attachment.

There is one case study on maltreated twins published in 1999 with a follow-up in 2006. This study assessed the twins between the ages of 19 and 36 months, during which time they had multiple moves and placements. The paper explores the similarities, differences and comorbidity of RAD, disorganized attachment and post traumatic stress disorder. The girl showed signs of the inhibited form of RAD while the boy showed signs of the indiscriminate form. It was noted that the diagnosis of RAD ameliorated with better care but symptoms of post traumatic stress disorder and signs of disorganized attachment came and went as the infants progressed through multiple placement changes. At age three, some lasting relationship disturbance was evident.

In the follow-up case study when the twins were aged three and eight years, the lack of longitudinal research on maltreated as opposed to institutionalized children was again highlighted. The girl's symptoms of disorganized attachment had developed into controlling behaviors—a well-documented outcome. The boy still exhibited self-endangering behaviors, not within RAD criteria but possibly within "secure base distortion", (where the child has a preferred familiar caregiver, but the relationship is such that the child cannot use the adult for safety while gradually exploring the environment). At age eight the children were assessed with a variety of measures including those designed to access representational systems, or the child's "internal working models". The twins' symptoms were indicative of different trajectories. The girl showed externalizing symptoms (particularly deceit), contradictory reports of current functioning, chaotic personal narratives, struggles with friendships, and emotional disengagement with her caregiver, resulting in a clinical picture described as "quite concerning". The boy still evidenced self-endangering behaviors as well as avoidance in relationships and emotional expression, separation anxiety and impulsivity and attention difficulties. It was apparent that life stressors had impacted each child differently. The narrative measures used were considered helpful in tracking how early attachment disruption is associated with later expectations about relationships.

One paper using questionnaires found that children aged three to six, diagnosed with RAD, scored lower on empathy but higher on self-monitoring (regulating your behavior to "look good"). These differences were especially pronounced based on ratings by parents, and suggested that children with RAD may systematically report their personality traits in overly positive ways. Their scores also indicated considerably more behavioral problems than scores of the control children.

== Epidemiology ==
Epidemiological data are limited, but reactive attachment disorder appears to be very uncommon. The prevalence of RAD is unclear but it is probably quite rare, other than in populations of children being reared in the most extreme, deprived settings such as some orphanages. There is little systematically gathered epidemiologic information on RAD. A cohort study of 211 Copenhagen children to the age of 18 months found a prevalence of 0.9%.

Attachment disorders tend to occur in a definable set of contexts such as within some types of institutions, in the presence of repeated changes of primary caregiver or of extremely neglectful identifiable primary caregivers who show persistent disregard for the child's basic attachment needs, but not all children raised in these conditions develop an attachment disorder. Studies undertaken on children from Eastern European orphanages from the mid-1990s showed significantly higher levels of both forms of RAD and of insecure patterns of attachment in the institutionalized children, regardless of how long they had been there. It would appear that children in institutions like these are unable to form selective attachments to their caregivers. The difference between the institutionalized children and the control group had lessened in the follow-up study three years later, although the institutionalized children continued to show significantly higher levels of indiscriminate friendliness. However, even among children raised in the most deprived institutional conditions the majority did not show symptoms of this disorder.

A 2002 study of children in residential nurseries in Bucharest, in which the DAI was used, challenged the current DSM and ICD conceptualizations of disordered attachment and showed that inhibited and disinhibited disorders could coexist in the same child.

There are two studies on the incidence of RAD relating to high risk and maltreated children in the U.S. Both used ICD, DSM and the DAI. The first, in 2004, reported that children from the maltreatment sample were significantly more likely to meet criteria for one or more attachment disorders than children from the other groups, however this was mainly the proposed new classification of disrupted attachment disorder rather than the DSM or ICD classified RAD or DAD. The second study, also in 2004, attempted to ascertain the prevalence of RAD and whether it could be reliably identified in maltreated rather than neglected toddlers. Of the 94 maltreated toddlers in foster care, 35% were identified as having ICD RAD and 22% as having ICD DAD, and 38% fulfilled the DSM criteria for RAD. This study found that RAD could be reliably identified and also that the inhibited and disinhibited forms were not independent. However, there are some methodological concerns with this study. A number of the children identified as fulfilling the criteria for RAD did in fact have a preferred attachment figure.

It has been suggested by some within the field of attachment therapy that RAD may be quite prevalent because severe child maltreatment, which is known to increase risk for RAD, is prevalent and because children who are severely abused may exhibit behaviors similar to RAD behaviors. The APSAC Taskforce consider this inference to be flawed and questionable. Severely abused children may exhibit similar behaviors to RAD behaviors but there are several far more common and demonstrably treatable diagnoses which may better account for these difficulties. Further, many children experience severe maltreatment and do not develop clinical disorders. Resilience is a common and normal human characteristic. RAD does not underlie all or even most of the behavioral and emotional problems seen in foster children, adoptive children, or children who are maltreated and rates of child abuse and/or neglect or problem behaviors are not a benchmark for estimates of RAD.

There are few data on comorbid conditions, but there are some conditions that arise in the same circumstances in which RAD arises, such as institutionalization or maltreatment. These are principally developmental delays and language disorders associated with neglect. Conduct disorders, oppositional defiant disorder, anxiety disorders, post-traumatic stress disorder and social phobia share many symptoms and are often comorbid with or confused with RAD. Attachment disorder behaviors amongst institutionalized children are correlated with attentional and conduct problems and cognitive levels but nonetheless appear to index a distinct set of symptoms and behaviors.

== History ==
Reactive attachment disorder first made its appearance in standard nosologies of psychological disorders in DSM-III, 1980, following an accumulation of evidence on institutionalized children. The criteria included a requirement of onset before the age of 8 months and was equated with failure to thrive. Both these features were dropped in DSM-III-R, 1987. Instead, onset was changed to being within the first 5 years of life and the disorder itself was divided into two subcategories, inhibited and disinhibited. These changes resulted from further research on maltreated and institutionalized children and remain in the current version, DSM-IV, 1994, and its 2000 text revision, DSM-IV-TR, as well as in ICD-10, 1992. Both nosologies focus on young children who are not merely at increased risk for subsequent disorders but are already exhibiting clinical disturbance.

The broad theoretical framework for current versions of RAD is attachment theory, based on work conducted from the 1940s to the 1980s by John Bowlby, Mary Ainsworth and René Spitz. Attachment theory is a framework that employs psychological, ethological and evolutionary concepts to explain social behaviors typical of young children. Attachment theory focuses on the tendency of infants or children to seek proximity to a particular attachment figure (familiar caregiver), in situations of alarm or distress, behavior which appears to have survival value. This is known as a discriminatory or selective attachment. Subsequently, the child begins to use the caregiver as a base of security from which to explore the environment, returning periodically to the familiar person. Attachment is not the same as love and/or affection although they are often associated. Attachment and attachment behaviors tend to develop between the ages of six months and three years. Infants become attached to adults who are sensitive and responsive in social interactions with the infant, and who remain as consistent caregivers for some time. Caregiver responses lead to the development of patterns of attachment, that in turn lead to internal working models which will guide the individual's feelings, thoughts, and expectations in later relationships. For a diagnosis of reactive attachment disorder, the child's history and atypical social behavior must suggest the absence of formation of a discriminatory or selective attachment.

The pathological absence of a discriminatory or selective attachment needs to be differentiated from the existence of attachments with either typical or somewhat atypical behavior patterns, known as styles or patterns. There are four attachment styles ascertained and used within developmental attachment research. These are known as secure, anxious-ambivalent, anxious-avoidant, (all organized) and disorganized. The latter three are characterised as insecure. These are assessed using the Strange Situation Procedure, designed to assess the quality of attachments rather than whether an attachment exists at all.

A securely attached toddler will explore freely while the caregiver is present, engage with strangers, be visibly upset when the caregiver departs, and happy to see the caregiver return. The anxious-ambivalent toddler is anxious of exploration, extremely distressed when the caregiver departs but ambivalent when the caregiver returns. The anxious-avoidant toddler will not explore much, avoid or ignore the parent—showing little emotion when the parent departs or returns—and treat strangers much the same as caregivers with little emotional range shown. The disorganized/disoriented toddler shows a lack of a coherent style or pattern for coping. Evidence suggests this occurs when the caregiving figure is also an object of fear, thus putting the child in an irresolvable situation regarding approach and avoidance. On reunion with the caregiver, these children can look dazed or frightened, freezing in place, backing toward the caregiver or approaching with head sharply averted, or showing other behaviors implying fear of the person who is being sought. It is thought to represent a breakdown of an inchoate attachment strategy and it appears to affect the capacity to regulate emotions.

Although there are a wide range of attachment difficulties within the styles which may result in emotional disturbance and increase the risk of later psychopathologies, particularly the disorganized style, none of the styles constitute a disorder in themselves and none equate to criteria for RAD as such. A disorder in the clinical sense is a condition requiring treatment, as opposed to risk factors for subsequent disorders. Reactive attachment disorder denotes a lack of typical attachment behaviors rather than an attachment style, however problematic that style may be, in that there is an unusual lack of discrimination between familiar and unfamiliar people in both forms of the disorder. Such discrimination does exist as a feature of the social behavior of children with atypical attachment styles. Both DSM-IV and ICD-10 depict the disorder in terms of socially aberrant behavior in general rather than focusing more specifically on attachment behaviors as such. DSM-IV emphasizes a failure to initiate or respond to social interactions across a range of relationships and ICD-10 similarly focuses on contradictory or ambivalent social responses that extend across social situations. The relationship between patterns of attachment in the Strange Situation and RAD is not yet clear.

There is a lack of consensus about the precise meaning of the term "attachment disorder". The term is frequently used both as an alternative to reactive attachment disorder and in discussions about different proposed classifications for disorders of attachment beyond the limitations of the ICD and DSM classifications. It is also used within the field of attachment therapy, as is the term reactive attachment disorder, to describe a range of problematic behaviors not within the ICD or DSM criteria or not related directly to attachment styles or difficulties at all.

== Research ==
Research from the late 1990s indicated there were disorders of attachment not captured by DSM or ICD and showed that RAD could be diagnosed reliably without evidence of pathogenic care, thus illustrating some of the conceptual difficulties with the rigid structure of the current definition of RAD. Research published in 2004 showed that the disinhibited form can endure alongside structured attachment behavior (of any style) towards the child's permanent caregivers.

Some authors have proposed a broader continuum of definitions of attachment disorders ranging from RAD through various attachment difficulties to the more problematic attachment styles. There is as yet no consensus, on this issue but a new set of practice parameters containing three categories of attachment disorder has been proposed by C.H. Zeanah and N. Boris. The first of these is disorder of attachment, in which a young child has no preferred adult caregiver. The proposed category of disordered attachment is parallel to RAD in its inhibited and disinhibited forms, as defined in DSM and ICD. The second category is secure base distortion, where the child has a preferred familiar caregiver, but the relationship is such that the child cannot use the adult for safety while gradually exploring the environment. Such children may endanger themselves, cling to the adult, be excessively compliant, or show role reversals in which they care for or punish the adult. The third type is disrupted attachment. Disrupted attachment is not covered under ICD-10 and DSM criteria, and results from an abrupt separation or loss of a familiar caregiver to whom attachment has developed. This form of categorisation may demonstrate more clinical accuracy overall than the current DSM-IV-TR classification, but further research is required. The practice parameters would also provide the framework for a diagnostic protocol. Most recently, Daniel Schechter and Erica Willheim have shown a relationship between some maternal violence-related posttraumatic stress disorder and secure base distortion (see above) which is characterized by child recklessness, separation anxiety, hypervigilance, and role-reversal.

Some research indicates there may be a significant overlap between behaviors of the inhibited form of RAD or DAD and aspects of disorganized attachment where there is an identified attachment figure.

An ongoing question is whether RAD should be thought of as a disorder of the child's personality or a distortion of the relationship between the child and a specific other person. It has been noted that as attachment disorders are by their very nature relational disorders, they do not fit comfortably into nosologies that characterize the disorder as centered on the person. Work by C.H. Zeanah indicates that atypical attachment-related behaviors may occur with one caregiver but not with another. This is similar to the situation reported for attachment styles, in which a particular parent's frightened expression has been considered as possibly responsible for disorganized/disoriented reunion behavior during the Strange Situation Procedure.

The draft of the proposed DSM-V suggests dividing RAD into two disorders, Reactive Attachment Disorder for the current inhibited form of RAD, and Disinhibited Social Engagement Disorder for what is currently the disinhibited form of RAD, with some alterations in the proposed DSM definition.

== See also ==
- Attachment parenting
- Borderline personality disorder
- Child development
- Emotional dysregulation
