= Attachment disorder =

Broad psychiatric condition

- Specialty: Psychiatry

Attachment disorders are disorders of mood, behavior, and social relationships arising from unavailability of normal socializing care and attention from primary caregiving figures in early childhood. Such a failure would result from unusual early experiences of neglect, abuse, abrupt separation from caregivers between three months and three years of age, frequent change or excessive numbers of caregivers, or lack of caregiver responsiveness to child communicative efforts resulting in a lack of basic trust. A problematic history of social relationships occurring after about age three may be distressing to a child, but does not result in attachment disorder.

== Attachment and attachment disorder ==
Attachment theory is primarily an evolutionary and ethological theory. In relation to infants, it primarily consists of proximity seeking to an attachment figure in the face of threat, for the purpose of survival. Although an attachment is a "tie", it is not synonymous with love and affection, despite their often going together; a healthy attachment is considered an important foundation of all subsequent relationships. Infants become attached to adults who are sensitive and responsive in social interactions with the infant, and who remain consistent caregivers for some time. Parental responses lead to the development of patterns of attachment which in turn lead to "internal working models" that guide one's feelings, thoughts, and expectations in later relationships.

A fundamental aspect of attachment is called basic trust. Basic trust is a broader concept than attachment in that it extends beyond the infant-caregiver relationship to "the wider social network of trustable and caring others" and "links confidence about the past with faith about the future". "Erikson argues that the sense of trust in oneself and others is the foundation of human development" and with a balance of mistrust produces hope.

In the clinical sense, a disorder is a condition requiring treatment as opposed to risk factors for subsequent disorders. There is a lack of consensus about the precise meaning of the term "attachment disorder", but there is general agreement that such disorders arise only after early adverse caregiving experiences. Reactive attachment disorder (RAD) indicates the absence of either or both the main aspects of proximity seeking to an identified attachment figure. This can occur in institutions, with repeated changes of caregiver, or from extremely neglectful primary caregivers who show persistent disregard for a child's basic attachment needs after the age of 6 months. Current official classifications of RAD under DSM-IV-TR and ICD-10 are largely based on this understanding of the nature of attachment.

The words attachment style or pattern refer to the various types of attachment arising from early care experiences, called secure, anxious-ambivalent, anxious-avoidant, (all organized), and disorganized. Some of these styles are more problematic than others, and, although they are not disorders in the clinical sense, are sometimes discussed under the term 'attachment disorder'.

Discussion of the disorganized attachment style sometimes includes it under the rubric of attachment disorders because disorganized attachment is seen as the beginning of a developmental trajectory that takes a person ever further from the normal range, culminating in actual disorders of thought, behavior, or mood. Early intervention for disorganized attachment, or other problematic styles, is directed toward changing the trajectory of development to provide a better outcome later in life.

Zeanah and colleagues proposed an alternative set of criteria (see below) of three categories of attachment disorder, namely "no discriminated attachment figure", "secure base distortions" and "disrupted attachment disorder". These classifications consider a disorder a variation that requires treatment rather than an individual difference within the normal range.

== Boris and Zeanah's typology ==
Many leading attachment theorists, such as Zeanah and Leiberman, have recognized the limitations of the DSM-IV-TR and ICD-10 criteria and proposed broader diagnostic criteria. There is as yet no official consensus on these criteria. The APSAC Taskforce recognised in its recommendations that "attachment problems extending beyond RAD, are a real and appropriate concern for professionals working with children", and set out recommendations for assessment.

Boris and Zeanah (1999), have offered an approach to attachment disorders that considers cases where children have had no opportunity to form an attachment, those where there is a distorted relationship, and those where an existing attachment has been abruptly disrupted. This would significantly extend the definition beyond the ICD-10 and DSM-IV-TR definitions because those definitions are limited to situations where the child has no attachment or no attachment to a specified attachment figure.

Boris and Zeanah use the term "disorder of attachment" to indicate a situation in which a young child has no preferred adult caregiver. Such children may be indiscriminately sociable and approach all adults, whether familiar or not; alternatively, they may be emotionally withdrawn and fail to seek comfort from anyone. This type of attachment problem is parallel to reactive attachment disorder as defined in DSM and ICD in its inhibited and disinhibited forms as described above.

Boris and Zeanah also describe a condition they term "secure base distortion". In this situation, the child has a preferred familiar caregiver, but the relationship is such that the child cannot use the adult for safety while gradually exploring the environment. Such children may endanger themselves, may cling to the adult, may be excessively compliant, or may show role reversals in which they care for or punish the adult.

The third type of disorder discussed by Boris and Zeanah is termed "disrupted attachment". This type of problem, which is not covered under other approaches to disordered attachment, results from an abrupt separation or loss of a familiar caregiver to whom attachment has developed. The young child's reaction to such a loss is parallel to the grief reaction of an older person, with progressive changes from protest (crying and searching) to despair, sadness, and withdrawal from communication or play, and finally detachment from the original relationship and recovery of social and play activities.

Most recently, Daniel Schechter and Erica Willheim have shown a relationship between maternal violence-related posttraumatic stress disorder and secure base distortion (see above) which is characterized by child recklessness, separation anxiety, hypervigilance, and role-reversal.

== Problems of attachment style ==
The majority of 1-year-old children can tolerate brief separations from familiar caregivers and are quickly comforted when the caregivers return. These children also use familiar people as a "secure base" and return to them periodically when exploring a new situation. Such children are said to have a secure attachment style, and characteristically continue to develop well both cognitively and emotionally.

Smaller numbers of children show less positive development at age 12 months. Their less desirable attachment styles may be predictors of poor later social development. Although these children's behavior at 12 months is not a serious problem, they appear to be on developmental trajectories that will end in poor social skills and relationships. Because attachment styles may serve as predictors of later development, it may be appropriate to think of certain attachment styles as part of the range of attachment disorders.

Insecure attachment styles in toddlers involve unusual reunions after separation from a familiar person. The children may snub the returning caregiver, or may go to the person but then resist being picked up. They may reunite with the caregiver, but then persistently cling to the caregiver, and fail to return to their previous play. These children are more likely to have later social problems with peers and teachers, but some of them spontaneously develop better ways of interacting with other people.

A small group of toddlers show a distressing way of reuniting after a separation. Called a disorganized/disoriented style, this reunion pattern can involve looking dazed or frightened, freezing in place, backing toward the caregiver or approaching with head sharply averted, or showing other behaviors that seem to imply fearfulness of the person who is being sought. Disorganized attachment has been considered a major risk factor for child psychopathology, as it appears to interfere with regulation or tolerance of negative emotions and may thus foster aggressive behavior. Disorganized patterns of attachment have the strongest links to concurrent and subsequent psychopathology, and considerable research has demonstrated both within-the-child and environmental correlates of disorganized attachment.

== Possible mechanisms ==
One study has reported a connection between a specific genetic marker and disorganized attachment (not RAD) associated with problems of parenting. Another author has compared atypical social behavior in genetic conditions such as Williams syndrome with behaviors symptomatic of RAD.

Typical attachment development begins with unlearned infant reactions to social signals from caregivers. The ability to send and receive social communications through facial expressions, gestures and voice develops with social experience by seven to nine months. This makes it possible for an infant to interpret messages of calm or alarm from face or voice. At about eight months, infants typically begin to respond with fear to unfamiliar or startling situations, and to look to the faces of familiar caregivers for information that either justifies or soothes their fear. This developmental combination of social skills and the emergence of fear reactions results in attachment behavior such as proximity-seeking, if a familiar, sensitive, responsive, and cooperative adult is available. Further developments in attachment, such as negotiation of separation in the toddler and preschool period, depend on factors such as the caregiver's interaction style and ability to understand the child's emotional communications.

With insensitive or unresponsive caregivers, or frequent changes, an infant may have few experiences that encourage proximity seeking to a familiar person. An infant who experiences fear but who cannot find comforting information in an adult's face and voice may develop atypical ways of coping with fearfulness such as the maintenance of distance from adults, or the seeking of proximity to all adults. These symptoms accord with the DSM criteria for reactive attachment disorder. Either of these behavior patterns may create a developmental trajectory leading ever farther from typical attachment processes such as the development of an internal working model of social relationships that facilitates both the giving and the receiving of care from others.

Atypical development of fearfulness, with a constitutional tendency either to excessive or inadequate fear reactions, might be necessary before an infant is vulnerable to the effects of poor attachment experiences.

Alternatively, the two variations of RAD may develop from the same inability to develop "stranger-wariness" due to inadequate care. Appropriate fear responses may only be able to develop after an infant has first begun to form a selective attachment. An infant who is not in a position to do this cannot afford not to show interest in any person as they may be potential attachment figures. Faced with a swift succession of carers the child may have no opportunity to form a selective attachment until the possible biologically determined sensitive period for developing stranger-wariness has passed. It is thought this process may lead to the disinhibited form.

In the inhibited form infants behave as if their attachment system has been "switched off". However the innate capacity for attachment behavior cannot be lost. This may explain why children diagnosed with the inhibited form of RAD from institutions almost invariably go on to show formation of attachment behavior to good carers. However children with the inhibited form as a consequence of neglect and frequent changes of caregiver continue to show the inhibited form for far longer when placed in families.

Additionally, the development of Theory of Mind plays a role in emotional development. Theory of Mind is the ability to know that the experience of knowledge and intention lies behind human actions such as facial expressions. Although it is reported that very young infants have different responses to humans than to non-human objects, Theory of Mind develops relatively gradually and possibly results from predictable interactions with adults. However, some ability of this kind must be in place before mutual communication through gaze or other gesture can occur, as it does by seven to nine months. Some neurodevelopmental disorders, such as autism, have been attributed to the absence of the mental functions that underlie Theory of Mind. It is possible that the congenital absence of this ability, or the lack of experiences with caregivers who communicate in a predictable fashion, could underlie the development of reactive attachment disorder.

== Diagnosis ==
Recognised assessment methods of attachment styles, difficulties or disorders include the Strange Situation procedure (Mary Ainsworth), the separation and reunion procedure and the Preschool Assessment of Attachment ("PAA"), the Observational Record of the Caregiving Environment ("ORCE") and the Attachment Q-sort ("AQ-sort"). More recent research also uses the Disturbances of Attachment Interview or "DAI" developed by Smyke and Zeanah, (1999). This is a semi-structured interview designed to be administered by clinicians to caregivers. It covers 12 items, namely having a discriminated, preferred adult, seeking comfort when distressed, responding to comfort when offered, social and emotional reciprocity, emotional regulation, checking back after venturing away from the care giver, reticence with unfamiliar adults, willingness to go off with relative strangers, self endangering behavior, excessive clinging, vigilance/hypercompliance and role reversal.

=== Classification ===
ICD-10 describes Reactive Attachment Disorder of Childhood, known as RAD, and Disinhibited Disorder of Childhood, less well known as DAD. DSM-IV-TR also describes Reactive Attachment Disorder of Infancy or Early Childhood. It divides this into two subtypes, Inhibited Type and Disinhibited Type, both known as RAD. The two classifications are similar and both include:

- markedly disturbed and developmentally inappropriate social relatedness in most contexts,
- the disturbance is not accounted for solely by developmental delay and does not meet the criteria for Pervasive Developmental Disorder,
- onset before 5 years of age,
- requires a history of significant neglect, and
- implicit lack of identifiable, preferred attachment figure.

ICD-10 includes in its diagnosis psychological and physical abuse and injury in addition to neglect. This is somewhat controversial, being a commission rather than omission and because abuse in and of itself does not lead to attachment disorder [why not?].

The inhibited form is described as "a failure to initiate or respond ... to most social interactions, as manifest by excessively inhibited responses" and such infants do not seek and accept comfort at times of threat, alarm or distress, thus failing to maintain 'proximity', an essential element of attachment behavior. The disinhibited form shows "indiscriminate sociability ... excessive familiarity with relative strangers" (DSM-IV-TR) and therefore a lack of 'specificity', the second basic element of attachment behavior. The ICD-10 descriptions are comparable. 'Disinhibited' and 'inhibited' are not opposites in terms of attachment disorder and can co-exist in the same child. The inhibited form has a greater tendency to ameliorate with an appropriate caregiver whilst the disinhibited form is more enduring.

While RAD is likely to occur following neglectful and abusive childcare, there should be no automatic diagnosis on this basis alone as children can form stable attachments and social relationships despite marked abuse and neglect. Abuse can occur alongside the required factors but on its own does not explain attachment disorder. Experiences of abuse are associated with the development of disorganised attachment, in which the child prefers a familiar caregiver, but responds to that person in an unpredictable and somewhat bizarre way. Within official classifications, attachment disorganization is a risk factor but not in itself an attachment disorder. Further, although attachment disorders tend to occur in the context of some institutions, repeated changes of primary caregiver, or extremely neglectful identifiable primary caregivers who show persistent disregard for the child's basic attachment needs, not all children raised in these conditions develop an attachment disorder.

== Treatment ==
There are a variety of mainstream prevention programs and treatment approaches for attachment disorder, attachment problems and moods or behaviors considered to be potential problems within the context of attachment theory. All such approaches for infants and younger children concentrate on increasing the responsiveness and sensitivity of the caregiver, or if that is not possible, changing the caregiver. Such approaches include 'Watch, wait and wonder,' manipulation of sensitive responsiveness, modified 'Interaction Guidance,'. 'Preschool Parent Psychotherapy,'. Circle of Security', Attachment and Biobehavioral Catch-up (ABC), the New Orleans Intervention, and Parent-Child psychotherapy. Other known treatment methods include Developmental, Individual-difference, Relationship-based therapy (DIR) (also referred to as Floor Time) by Stanley Greenspan, although DIR is primarily directed to treatment of pervasive developmental disorders Some of these approaches, such as that suggested by Dozier, consider the attachment status of the adult caregiver to play an important role in the development of the emotional connection between adult and child. This includes foster parents, as children with poor attachment experiences often do not elicit appropriate caregiver responses from their attachment behaviors despite 'normative' care.

Treatment for reactive attachment disorder for children usually involves a mix of therapy, counseling, and parenting education. These must be designed to make sure the child has a safe environment to live in and to develop positive interactions with caregivers and improves their relationships with their peers.

Medication can be used to treat similar conditions, like depression, anxiety, or hyperactivity, but there is no quick fix for reactive attachment disorder. A pediatrician may recommend a treatment plan, such as a mix of family therapy, individual psychological counseling, play therapy, special education services and parenting skills classes.

== Pseudoscientific diagnoses and treatment ==
In the absence of officially recognized diagnostic criteria, and beyond the ambit of the discourse on a broader set of criteria discussed above, the term "attachment disorder" has been increasingly used by clinicians to refer to a broader set of children whose behavior may be affected by lack of a primary attachment figure, a seriously unhealthy attachment relationship with a primary caregiver, or a disrupted attachment relationship. Although there are no studies examining diagnostic accuracy, concern is expressed as to the potential for over-diagnosis based on broad checklists and 'snapshots'. This form of therapy, including diagnosis and accompanying parenting techniques, is scientifically unvalidated and is not considered part of mainstream psychology or, despite its name, to be based on attachment theory, with which it is considered incompatible. It has been described as potentially abusive and a pseudoscientific intervention that has resulted in tragic outcomes for children.

A common feature of this form of diagnosis within attachment therapy is the use of extensive lists of "symptoms" that include many behaviours that are likely to be a consequence of neglect or abuse, but are not related to attachment, or to any clinical disorder at all. Such lists have been described as "wildly inclusive". The APSAC Taskforce (2006) gives examples of such lists ranging across multiple domains from some elements within the DSM-IV criteria to entirely non-specific behavior such as developmental lags, destructive behavior, refusal to make eye contact, cruelty to animals and siblings, lack of cause and effect thinking, preoccupation with fire, blood and gore, poor peer relationships, stealing, lying, lack of a conscience, persistent nonsense questions or incessant chatter, poor impulse control, abnormal speech patterns, fighting for control over everything, and hoarding or gorging on food. Some checklists suggest that among infants, "prefers dad to mom" or "wants to hold the bottle as soon as possible" are indicative of attachment problems. The APSAC Taskforce expresses concern that "high rates of false positive diagnoses are virtually certain" and that "posting these types of lists on web sites that also serve as marketing tools may lead many parents or others to conclude inaccurately that their children have attachment disorders".

There is also a considerable variety of treatments for alleged attachment disorders diagnosed on the controversial alternative basis outlined above, popularly known as attachment therapy. These therapies have little or no evidence base and vary from talking or play therapies to more extreme forms of physical and coercive techniques, of which the best known are holding therapy, rebirthing, rage-reduction and the Evergreen model. In general these therapies are aimed at adopted or fostered children with a view to creating attachment in them to their new caregivers. Critics maintain these therapies are not based on an accepted version of attachment theory. The theoretical base is broadly a combination of regression and catharsis, accompanied by parenting methods that emphasise obedience and parental control. These therapies concentrate on changing the child rather than the caregiver. An estimated six children have died as a consequence of the more coercive forms of such treatments and the application of the accompanying parenting techniques.

Two of the best-known cases are those of Candace Newmaker in 2001 and the Gravelles in 2003 to 2005. After the associated publicity, some advocates of attachment therapy began to alter views and practices to be less potentially dangerous to children. This change may have been hastened by the publication of a Task Force Report on the subject in 2006, commissioned by the American Professional Society on the Abuse of Children (APSAC), which was largely critical of attachment therapy, although these practices continue. In 2007, ATTACh, an organisation originally set up by attachment therapists, formally adopted a White Paper stating its unequivocal opposition to coercive practices in therapy and parenting.

== See also ==
- Reactive attachment disorder
- Disinhibited social engagement disorder
- Adult attachment disorder
- Complex post-traumatic stress disorder
- Dead mother complex
- Emotional dysregulation
- John Bowlby
