= Disinhibited social engagement disorder =

Attachment disorder

- Other names: Disinhibited attachment disorder
- Specialty: Psychiatry
- Usual onset: After 9 months of age
- Causes: Child neglect
- Differential diagnosis: Attention deficit hyperactivity disorder

Disinhibited social engagement disorder (DSED), also known as disinhibited attachment disorder, is an attachment disorder in which a child displays little to no fear of unfamiliar adults, and may actively approach them. The disorder can significantly impair a young child's ability to relate with adults and peers, and may put them in dangerous and potentially unsafe situations. Children with DSED may, for example, be unable to distinguish between a stranger and a parent or guardian, leaving them susceptible to abduction.

DSED is exclusively classified as a childhood disorder, although some associated symptoms may persist into adolescence and young adulthood. It is usually diagnosed in children after nine months of age, and before age 6. Infants and young children who receive inconsistent or insufficient care from a primary caregiver are at risk of developing DSED. Like reactive attachment disorder, it is commonly diagnosed in children raised in foster care or other institutional environments.

== Signs and symptoms ==
The most common symptom of DSED is unusual interaction with strangers. A child with DSED shows no sign of fear or discomfort when talking to, touching, or accompanying an adult stranger. Examples of these behaviors in children include the following:

- Overly familiar verbal or physical behavior that is not consistent with culturally sanctioned and appropriate social boundaries, or seems out of character for their current age.
- Lack of reservation when approaching and interacting with unfamiliar adults.
- Not checking back with an adult caregiver after venturing away, even in unfamiliar settings.
- Willingness to go off with an unfamiliar adult with minimal or no hesitation.

DSED is also associated with a disorganized attachment style, and is commonly seen in children living in foster care institutions.

Children with DSED can display symptoms commonly associated with attention deficit hyperactivity disorder (ADHD). The disorder is often comorbid with cognitive, language and speech delay. DSED is not the likely diagnosis for socially disinhibited children who have not experienced neglect; in such cases, the child's behavior can be attributed by other disorders such as Williams syndrome, a genetic disorder which has similar symptoms to DSED.

== Risk factors ==
DSED is commonly seen in children with negligent, absent, or inconsistent primary caregivers, particularly in the first few years of childhood. Children who are institutionalized may receive inconsistent care or suffer from periods of prolonged isolation during hospitalization' this is typically seen during inpatient stays, when a child may receive care from many different staff members. Parental issues such as mental health problems, depression, personality disorder, absence, poverty, teen parenting, or substance abuse may also interfere with attachment.

== Diagnosis ==
The International Classification of Diseases defines DSED as "a particular pattern of abnormal social functioning that arises during the first five years of life and that tends to persist despite marked changes in environmental circumstances, e.g. diffuse, nonselectively focused attachment behavior, attention-seeking and indiscriminately friendly behavior, poorly modulated peer interactions; depending on circumstances, there may also be associated emotional or behavioral disturbance." Attention deficit hyperactivity disorder is a common differential diagnosis.

Adolescents who exhibit symptoms of DSED can often be misdiagnosed due to several contributing factors, such as a history of neglect, an overidentifying or misidentifying of symptoms through incorrect differential diagnosis, and the disregarding of comorbid conditions that could account for their symptoms. Several contributing factors to DSED may influence the symptomatic behavior of children diagnosed with the disorder. For example, adolescents diagnosed with DSED and ADHD experience overlapping symptoms that are essential to identify in order to make appropriate diagnoses and treatment plans.

== Treatment ==
Play therapy and expressive therapy are two effective treatment approaches that have shown success at forming feelings of attachment in children through multi-sensory means. Such therapies allow for nonverbal communication to bridge gaps between the child and their therapist.

== Prognosis ==
The behavior of a child with disinhibited social engagement disorder typically changes and evolves during their preschool, middle school, and adolescent years.

- Preschool: In the early stages of child development, DSED is exhibited by a need for attention, and can manifest in overly boisterous behavior in an attempt to draw the attention of unfamiliar adults.
- Middle school: Identifiers of DSED at this stage include physical and verbal overfamiliarity with strangers, public displays of inauthentic emotions, and overly forward behavior. This can manifest as appearing sad in front of others to manipulate social situations, or being overly insistent upon visiting a friend's house after meeting them.
- Adolescence: Amongst this stage, children with DSED are likely to develop behavioral problems with peers and other authority figures such as parents and coaches. Psychologist Kathryn L. Humphreys of Vanderbilt University states that such children "develop superficial relationships with others, struggle with conflict, and continue to demonstrate indiscriminate behavior toward adults."

== Epidemiology ==
A study of 381 Norwegian adolescents living in residential foster care found that 8% of the trial participants exhibited behavioral symptoms consistent with DSED. While the disorder's exact prevalence within the general population is unknown, it may be as high as 20% in "high-risk" individuals.

== History ==
Disinhibited Social Engagement Disorder, listed as DSM-5 313.89 (F94.2) in the 2013 Diagnostic and Statistical Manual of Mental Disorders, was formerly listed as a sub-type of reactive attachment disorder (RAD) called disinhibited attachment disorder (DAD).

According to the American Psychiatric Association, "Disinhibited Social Engagement Disorder more closely resembles ADHD; it may occur in children who do not necessarily lack attachments and may have established or even secure attachments. The two disorders differ in other important ways, including correlates, course, and response to intervention, and for these reasons are considered separate disorders."

== Research ==
In a 2016 study conducted by clinical psychologist Stine Lehmann of the University of Bergen, a sample of school-aged foster children were tested and their foster parents and social workers completed a series of questionnaires, with the goal of better understanding the children and pinpointing signs of DSED. The results of the study provided evidence that DSED was its own separate dimension of psychology.

== See also ==
- Reactive attachment disorder
- Attachment style
