= Daniel S. Pine =

American psychiatrist and researcher

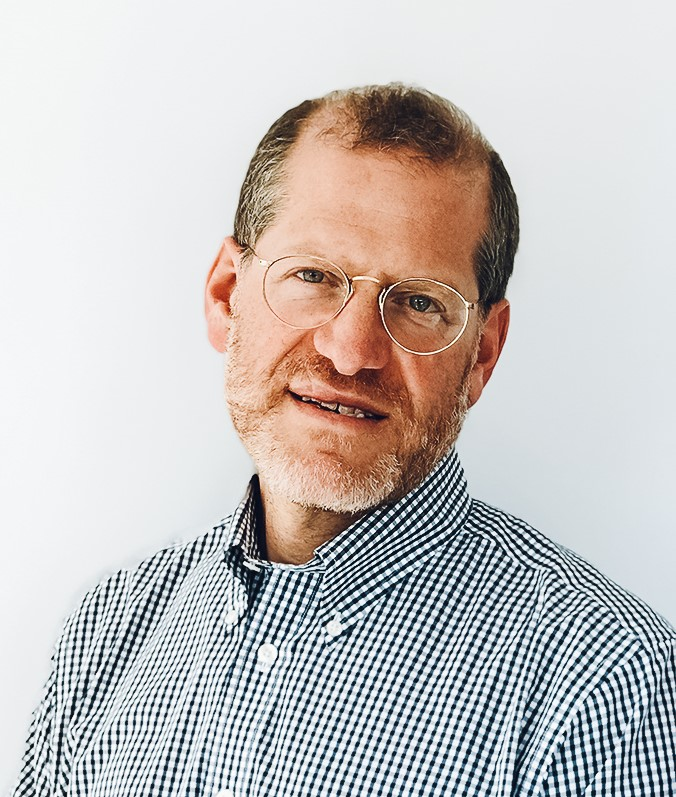
- Born: April 19, 1963 (age 63); Hyannis, Massachusetts, U.S.
- Education: Grinnell College (BA); University of Chicago Pritzker School of Medicine (MD)
- Known for: Research on pediatric mood and anxiety disorders and brain function
- Scientific career
- Fields: Psychiatry; child and adolescent psychiatry; developmental neuroscience
- Workplaces: National Institute of Mental Health (NIMH)

Daniel S. Pine (born April 19, 1963) is an American psychiatrist and researcher specializing in pediatric mental health, novel therapeutics, mood and anxiety disorders, and developmental neuroscience. He is Chief of the Emotion and Development Branch and of the Section on Development and Affective Neuroscience at the National Institute of Mental Health (NIMH).

== Early life ==
Pine was born in Hyannis, Massachusetts. After attending high school in Decatur, Illinois, he earned a B.A. in anthropology from Grinnell College in 1985 and an M.D. from the University of Chicago Pritzker School of Medicine in 1990. He completed postgraduate training in psychiatry, child psychiatry, and child psychiatry research at Columbia University, Columbia Presbyterian Medical Center, and the New York State Psychiatric Institute.

== Career ==
Between 1993 and 2000, Pine worked in clinical and academic positions at Columbia University and the New York State Psychiatric Institute.

Pine joined the National Institute of Mental Health (NIMH) Intramural Research Program in 2000. From 2000 to 2010, he was Chief of Child and Adolescent Research in the Mood and Anxiety Disorders Program. Since 2000, he has been Chief of the Section on Development and Affective Neuroscience at the institute. He served as Chief of the Emotion and Development Branch from 2006 to 2009, and he became Chief again in 2019.

Pine's research has focused on relations among psychopathology, brain development, and stress, anxiety, and mood symptoms. His research group has examined how pediatric mood and anxiety disorders relate to activity in brain regions including the amygdala and prefrontal cortex, and has also researched the treatment of pediatric emotional disorders. Pine has authored over 700 peer-reviewed articles. He has served as an editor or on editorial boards of academic journals including the American Journal of Psychiatry, Biological Psychiatry, Journal of Affective Disorders, Psychological Medicine, Development and Psychopathology, and Clinical Psychological Science.

Pine received the Blanche F. Ittelson Award from the American Psychiatric Association in 2000, the Joel Elkes Award from the American College of Neuropsychopharmacology in 2008. He was selected as a Distinguished Investigator at the National Institute of Health in 2019. He is a member of the National Academy of Medicine.
