= Developmental psychobiology =

Developmental psychobiology is an interdisciplinary field, encompassing developmental psychology, biological psychology, neuroscience and many other areas of biology. The field covers all phases of ontogeny, with particular emphasis on prenatal, perinatal and early childhood development. Conducting research into basic aspects of development, for example, the development of infant attachment, sleep, eating, thermoregulation, learning, attention and acquisition of language occupies most developmental psychobiologists. At the same time, they are actively engaged in research on applied problems such as sudden infant death syndrome, the development and care of the preterm infant, autism, and the effects of various prenatal insults (e.g., maternal stress, alcohol exposure) on the development of brain and behavior (see Michel & Moore, 1995).

Developmental psychobiologists employ and integrate both biological and psychological concepts and methods (cf. Michel & Moore, 1995) and have historically been highly concerned with the interrelation between ontogeny and phylogeny (or individual development and evolutionary processes; see, e.g., Blumberg, 2002, 2005; Gottlieb, 1991; Moore, 2001).

Developmental psychobiologists also tend to be systems thinkers, avoiding the reification of artificial dichotomies (e.g., "nature" vs. "nurture"). Many developmental psychobiologists thus take exception to both the favored methods and theoretical underpinnings of fields like evolutionary psychology (see, e.g., Lickliter & Honeycutt, 2003; Narvaez et al., 2022).

One of the goals of developmental psychobiology is to explain the physical development of the nervous system and how that affects the individual's development in the long term. As seen in a study performed by Molly J. Goodfellow and Derick H. Lindquist, rats exposed to ethanol during early postnatal development experience structural and functional impairments throughout the brain, including the hypothalamus. These developmental complications caused the ethanol-exposed rats to lose their long-term memory capabilities, but maintain a nearly equal short-term memory capacity to that of the control rats. For more information about how ethanol affects the postnatal development of rats, see (e.g., Molly J. Goodfellow and Derick H. Lindquist, 2014).

== Morphology problem ==
One of the essential issues in developmental psychobiology is the Morphology problem of proper nervous system development. This direction of research attempts to explain the precise coordination of all cells in space and time during embryological processes of cells and tissue differentiation for the shaping of the particular nervous system structure.

In cognitive development, shaping the proper nervous system is necessary for emerging multiple brain-based functions that enable humans to perform mental processes such as perception, learning, memory, understanding, awareness, reasoning, judgment, intuition, and language. Our nervous system operates over everything that makes us human. It means that only the formation of neural tissues in a certain way contributes to shaping cognitive functions.

However, a lack of knowledge about the precise coordination of all cells in space and time during the embryonal period does not allow us to understand how this formation of neural tissues in a certain way proceeds: what forces at the cellular level coordinate four very general classes of tissue deformation, namely tissue folding and invagination, tissue flow and extension, tissue hollowing, and, finally, tissue branching (Collinet, C., Lecuit, T., 2021). Gene activity from interaction with events and experiences in the environment cannot alone shape tissues in morphogenesis since these processes may not be coordinated in time at the gene level. Again, the nervous system structures operate over everything that makes us human; therefore, forming neural tissues in a certain way is essential for shaping cognitive functions (Val Danilov, I., 2023). These findings mean that the formation of the nervous system's specific structure should be closely related to the precise coordination in time of all general classes of tissue deformation at the cell level. A complete developmental program with a template to create the final biological structure of the nervous system is also required for such a complex dynamic process (Val Danilov, I., 2023). The Shared intentionality approach proposes one of the solutions to the morphology problem, explaining this temporal cell coordination due to non-local coupling in the low-frequency electromagnetic field of the mother's heart (Val Danilov, I., 2023). This position states that, since the reflex stage of development, and even earlier, the embryonal nervous system evolves in a certain way by copying the maternal ecological dynamics (Val Danilov, I., 2023).

== See also ==
- Behavioral neuroscience
- Pre- and perinatal psychology
- Childbirth
- Pregnancy
