= Charles H. Zeanah =

American psychiatrist

Charles H. Zeanah Jr. is a child and adolescent psychiatrist who is a member of the council (Board) of the American Academy of Child and Adolescent Psychiatry (AACAP).

== Professional ==
Zeanah is a professor of Psychiatry and Professor of Clinical Pediatrics, Director of Child and Adolescent Psychiatry and vice-chair of the Department of Psychiatry and Neurology at the Tulane University School of Medicine. He is also an executive director of the Institute of Infant and Early Childhood Mental Health.

Zeanah is the editor of the Handbook of Infant Mental Health. His particular field of research is in child psychopathology focussing on infant-parent relationships, attachment and its development in high-risk environments. Zeanah has many scientific papers in peer-reviewed journals and books on these topics.

In 2005 Zeanah was the joint author, with N. Boris, of AACAP's Practice Parameter for the assessment and treatment of reactive attachment disorder. He was also a member of the American Professional Society on the Abuse of Children (APSAC) Taskforce which reported on attachment therapy, reactive attachment disorder, and attachment problems in 2006.

=== New Orleans Intervention program ===
In 1998, Zeanah, together with J.A. Larrieu, devised the New Orleans Intervention, a treatment and prevention program aimed at developmental and health needs of children under the age of five who have been maltreated and placed in foster care, with particular reference to their attachment status and needs. This program is currently in the process of being evaluated. Zeanah directs the Tulane Jefferson Parish Human Services Authority Infant Team, a community-based intervention program for abused and neglected infants and toddlers in the New Orleans area.

=== Practice parameters for attachment disorders ===
In a series of papers from 1996 onwards, Zeanah and N. Boris, building on the earlier work of A.F. Lieberman, proposed new practice parameters for the categorization of attachment disorders, currently categorized as reactive attachment disorder and disinhibited attachment disorder in DSM-IV-TR, the revised fourth edition of the American Psychiatric Association's Diagnostic and Statistical Manual of Mental Disorders (DSM), and the World Health Organization's International Statistical Classification of Diseases and Related Health Problems (ICD-10). The first new category is disorder of attachment, in which a young child has no preferred adult caregiver, parallel to RAD in its inhibited and disinhibited forms, as defined in DSM and ICD. The second is secure base distortion, where the child has a preferred familiar caregiver, but the relationship is such that the child cannot use the adult for safety while gradually exploring the environment. The third is disrupted attachment. Disrupted attachment is not covered under ICD-10 and DSM criteria, and results from an abrupt separation or loss of a familiar caregiver to whom attachment has developed. This form of categorization may demonstrate more clinical accuracy overall than the current DSM and ICD classifications, but further research is required.

== Bibliography ==
=== Books ===
- Nelson, Charles A.; Fox, Nathan A.; Zeanah, Charles H. (2014). Romania's abandoned children : deprivation, brain development, and the struggle for recovery. Cambridge, MA: Harvard University Press.

=== Essays and reporting ===
- Nelson III, Charles A.; Fox, Nathan A.; Zeanah Jr, Charles H. (April 2013). "Anguish of the abandoned child". Child Development. Scientific American. 308 (4): 44–49. Bibcode:2013SciAm.308d..62N. doi:10.1038/scientificamerican0413-62. PMID 23539791.
